= Women's championships in WWE =

Listing of professional wrestling championships

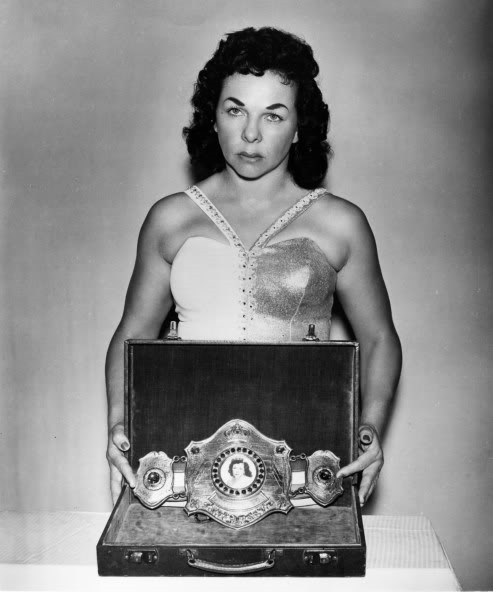
The Fabulous Moolah, WWE's inaugural women's champion, who is also recognized as the longest-reigning champion, holding the Original WWE Women's Championship from 1956 to 1984, when it was originally known as the NWA World Women's Championship

The American professional wrestling promotion WWE has maintained several women's championships (except for two interims in the 1990s) since 1983, when the World Wrestling Federation (WWF, now WWE) established the WWF Women's Tag Team Championship. One year later, the WWF bought the NWA Women's Championship and renamed it the WWF Women's Championship, establishing their first women's world championship. Although the title preceded the company's creation, the WWF claimed a lineage that began in 1956. Whenever the WWE brand extension has been implemented (2008–2010; 2016–present), separate women's championships have been created or allocated for each brand.

As of 2025, WWE promotes two world championships on its main roster: the Women's World Championship on Raw and the WWE Women's Championship on SmackDown.

WWE also promotes two secondary championships on its main roster: the WWE Women's Intercontinental Championship for RAW and the WWE Women's United States Championship for SmackDown.

For NXT, WWE promotes the NXT Women's Championship and the NXT Women's North American Championship as its primary and secondary championship respectively.

For its sub-developmental brand, Evolve, WWE promotes the WWE Women's ID Championship and the WWE Evolve Women's Championship.

For the tag team division, WWE promotes a tag team championship, the WWE Women's Tag Team Championship, which is defended across all shows.

Through its acquisition of the assets of World Championship Wrestling in 2001, the WWE currently owns the rights to the WCW Women's Championship and the WCW Women's Cruiserweight Championship.

== Overview of titles ==
=== Primary (World Championships) ===
Name	Years
WWF Women's Championship (original version)	1956–2010 (became WWF property in 1984)
WWE Divas Championship	2008–2016
WWE Women's Championship (current version)	2016–present
Women's World Championship	2016–present

=== Secondary ===
Name	Years
NXT Women's North American Championship	2024–present
WWE Women's Speed Championship	2024–2026
WWE Women's Intercontinental Championship	2024–present
WWE Women's United States Championship	2024–present

=== Tag team ===
Name	Years
WWF Women's Tag Team Championship	1983–1989
WWE Women's Tag Team Championship	2018–present

=== Developmental ===
Name	Years
NXT Women's Championship	2013–present
NXT UK Women's Championship	2018–2022
WWE Evolve Women's Championship	2025–present
WWE Women's ID Championship	2025–present

=== Developmental tag team ===
Name	Years
NXT Women's Tag Team Championship	2021–2023

=== Others ===
In addition to titles specifically designated for women, there were also two championships that were explicitly open to all challengers, regardless of gender. The following lists those two championships, the female wrestlers who won the titles, and the years the titles were active.

Name	Wrestler	Years
WWE Hardcore Championship	Godfather's Ho, Mighty Molly, Trish Stratus, Terri	1998–2002
WWE 24/7 Championship	Kelly Kelly, Candice Michelle, Alundra Blayze, Maria Kanellis, Carmella, Tamina, Alicia Fox, Dana Brooke, Nikki A.S.H./Cross, Doudrop, Alexa Bliss, Referee Daphanie LaShaunn	2019–2022

- Noted additional championship wins that women have won that are men only championships Chyna won the WWE Intercontinental Championship and also Madusa, Daffney and Jacqueline Moore won the WCW/WWE Cruiserweight Championship.

== Summary of championships ==
=== Singles championships ===
==== WWE Women's Championship (1956–2010) ====
The Original WWE Women's Championship was the first women's world championship of WWE. Its origins predate the company's creation. On September 18, 1956, The Fabulous Moolah became the third NWA World Women's Champion. Moolah had worked for the northeastern United States-based Capitol Wrestling Corporation (CWC), a member of the National Wrestling Alliance (NWA), since the previous year. In 1963, CWC seceded from the NWA and established itself as the World Wide Wrestling Federation (WWWF); it quietly rejoined the NWA in 1971. Moolah bought the rights to the championship in the 1970s and continued to defend the championship as the NWA World Women's Champion. The WWWF, renamed the World Wrestling Federation (WWF) in 1979, withdrew from the NWA for good in 1983. Moolah sold the championship's rights to the WWF in 1984, and she was recognized as the WWF Women's Champion. Instead of beginning her reign in 1984, the WWF claimed the lineage of her reign from when she first became champion in 1956. The preceding champions and the title changes between 1956 and when Moolah lost it in 1984 are not recognized by WWE, although they are recognized by the NWA. As a result, The Fabulous Moolah's first reign is considered to have lasted 28 years by the promotion.

After the company was renamed to World Wrestling Entertainment (WWE) in May 2002, the championship was subsequently referred to as the WWE Women's Championship. With the WWE brand extension that began in March 2002, the Women's Championship at first was still defended on both the Raw and SmackDown brands, while most titles were exclusive to one brand. In September, the Women's Championship became exclusive to Raw, but remained the sole championship contested by women until June 6, 2008, when a counterpart to the championship, called the WWE Divas Championship, was created for the SmackDown brand. The titles switched brands after their respective title holders were drafted to the opposite brands in the 2009 WWE draft. The Women's Championship was unified with the Divas Championship at Night of Champions in September 2010, creating the Unified WWE Divas Championship and rendering the Women's Championship defunct as the unified title followed the lineage of the Divas Championship; shortly after, the title dropped the "Unified" moniker. The final Women's Champion was Layla, although Michelle McCool had defended the title in her place in the unification match.

==== WWE Divas Championship (2008–2016) ====
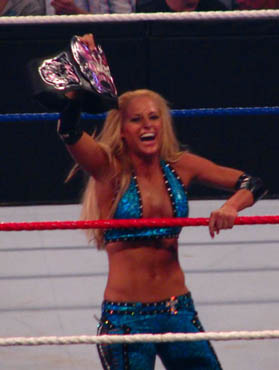
Inaugural WWE Divas Champion Michelle McCool

The WWE Divas Championship was the second women's world championship to be established by WWE. After several years of the WWE Women's Championship being contested exclusively on Raw, SmackDown established the Divas Championship on June 6, 2008, for their women's division. Its name was derived from WWE Divas, the term WWE had used at the time for the women's wrestlers. The inaugural champion was Michelle McCool. The titles would switch brands after their respective title holders were drafted to the opposite brands in the 2009 WWE draft. The following year at Night of Champions in September 2010, the Women's Championship was unified with the Divas Championship, creating the Unified WWE Divas Championship, rendering the Women's Championship defunct as the unified title followed the lineage of the Divas Championship; shortly after, the title dropped the "unified" moniker and the first brand extension ended in August 2011. The Divas Championship continued as the only women's championship of the main roster until 2016 when it was retired and replaced by a new WWE Women's Championship at WrestleMania 32 in April that year. The final Divas Champion was Charlotte Flair, at the time known simply as Charlotte.

==== NXT Women's Championship (2013–present) ====
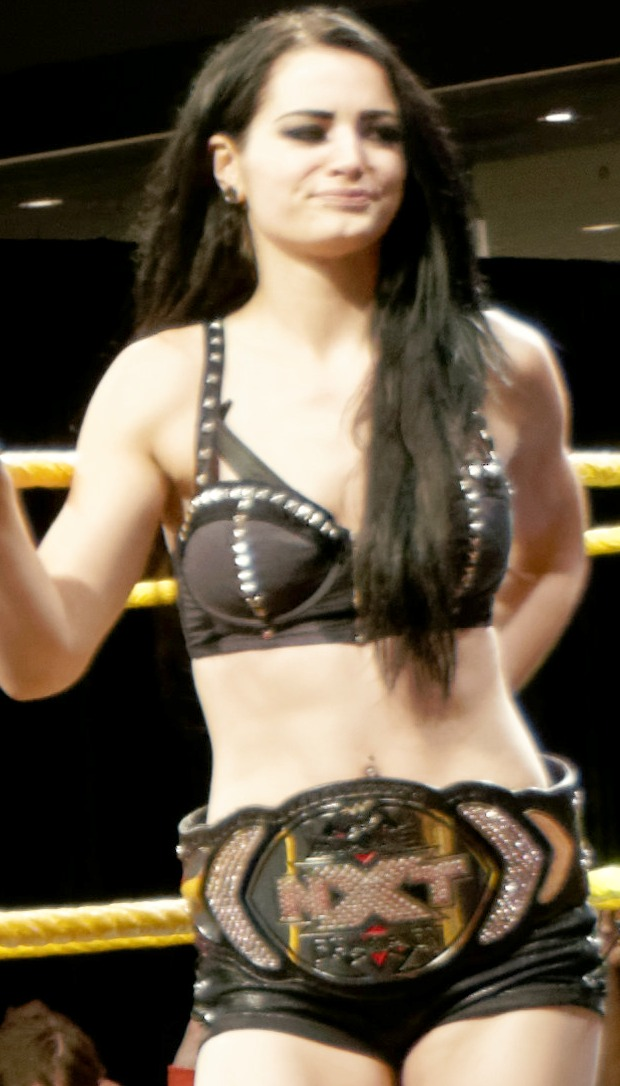
Inaugural NXT Women's Champion Paige, shown here with the original version (2013–2017) of the title belt

The NXT Women's Championship is the women's championship for WWE's developmental brand, NXT. The title was established in April 2013 and the inaugural champion was Paige. In September 2019, the title became one of WWE's three main women's titles when NXT became WWE's third major brand, however, it reverted to a developmental brand in September 2021.

==== WWE Women's Championship (2016–present) ====
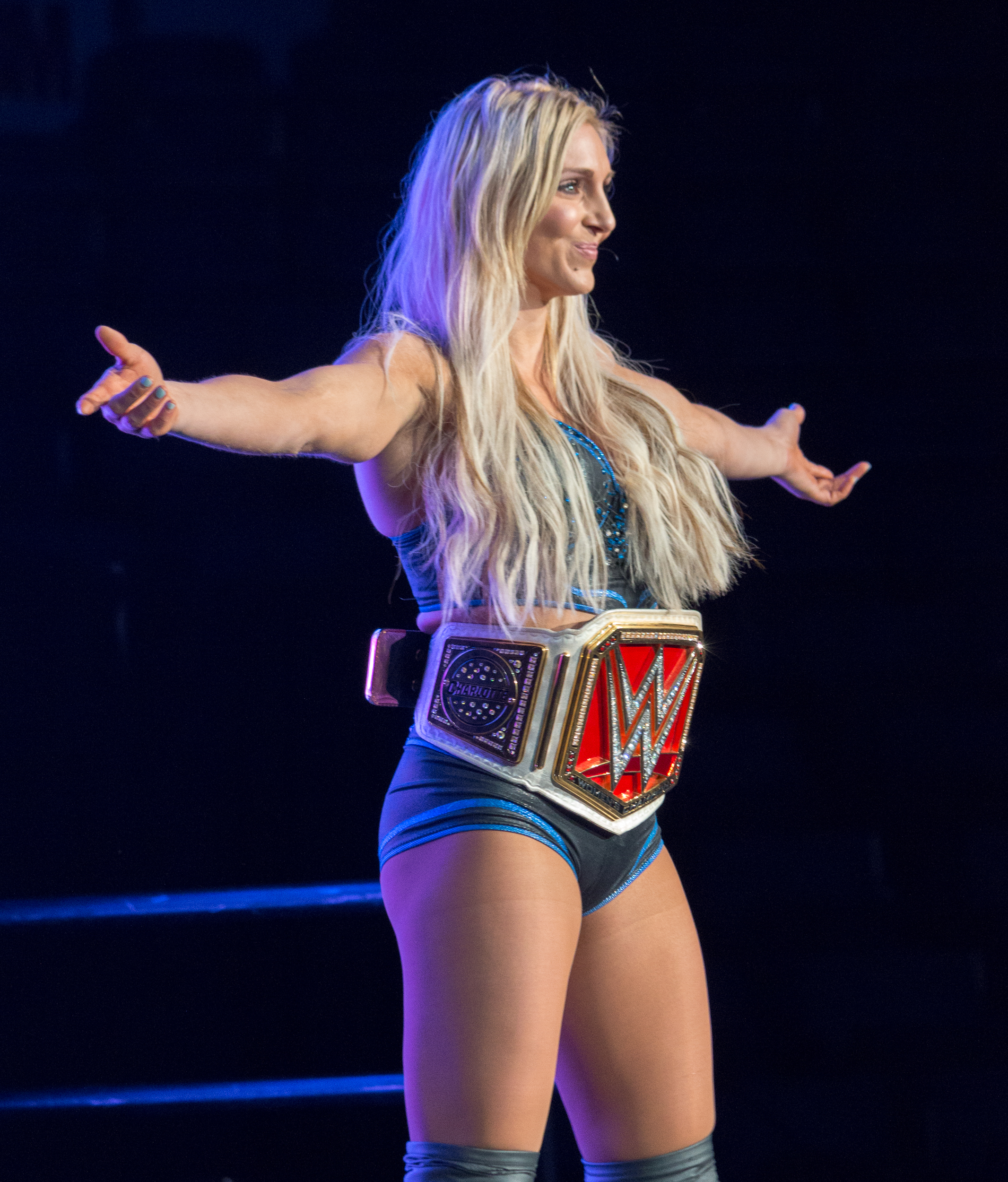
Charlotte Flair was the inaugural WWE Women's Champion, and she has held the most WWE championships out of any woman in the company's history at 17. She is shown here with the 2016–2023 version of the title belt.

The current WWE Women's Championship is the third women's world championship established by WWE and is currently the women's championship of the SmackDown brand. The title was unveiled at WrestleMania 32 in April 2016 to replace the Divas Championship. This came after the term "Diva" was scrutinized by some commentators, fans, and several past and present WWE female performers who were in favor of changing the championship to the Women's Championship. The division itself was also changed from being called the Divas division to being called the Women's division. This newer championship does not share its title history with the original WWE Women's Championship that was contested between 1956 and 2010. The inaugural champion was Charlotte Flair, who at the time simply went by Charlotte.

Following the reintroduction of the brand extension in July 2016, reigning champion Charlotte Flair was drafted to the Raw brand, making the championship exclusive to Raw. In response, SmackDown created the SmackDown Women's Championship as its counterpart. The WWE Women's Championship was subsequently renamed as the Raw Women's Championship to reflect its exclusivity to that brand. As a result of the 2023 WWE Draft, the championships switched brands, and the Raw Women's Championship reverted to its original name of WWE Women's Championship on the June 9, 2023 episode of SmackDown.

==== Women's World Championship (2016–present) ====
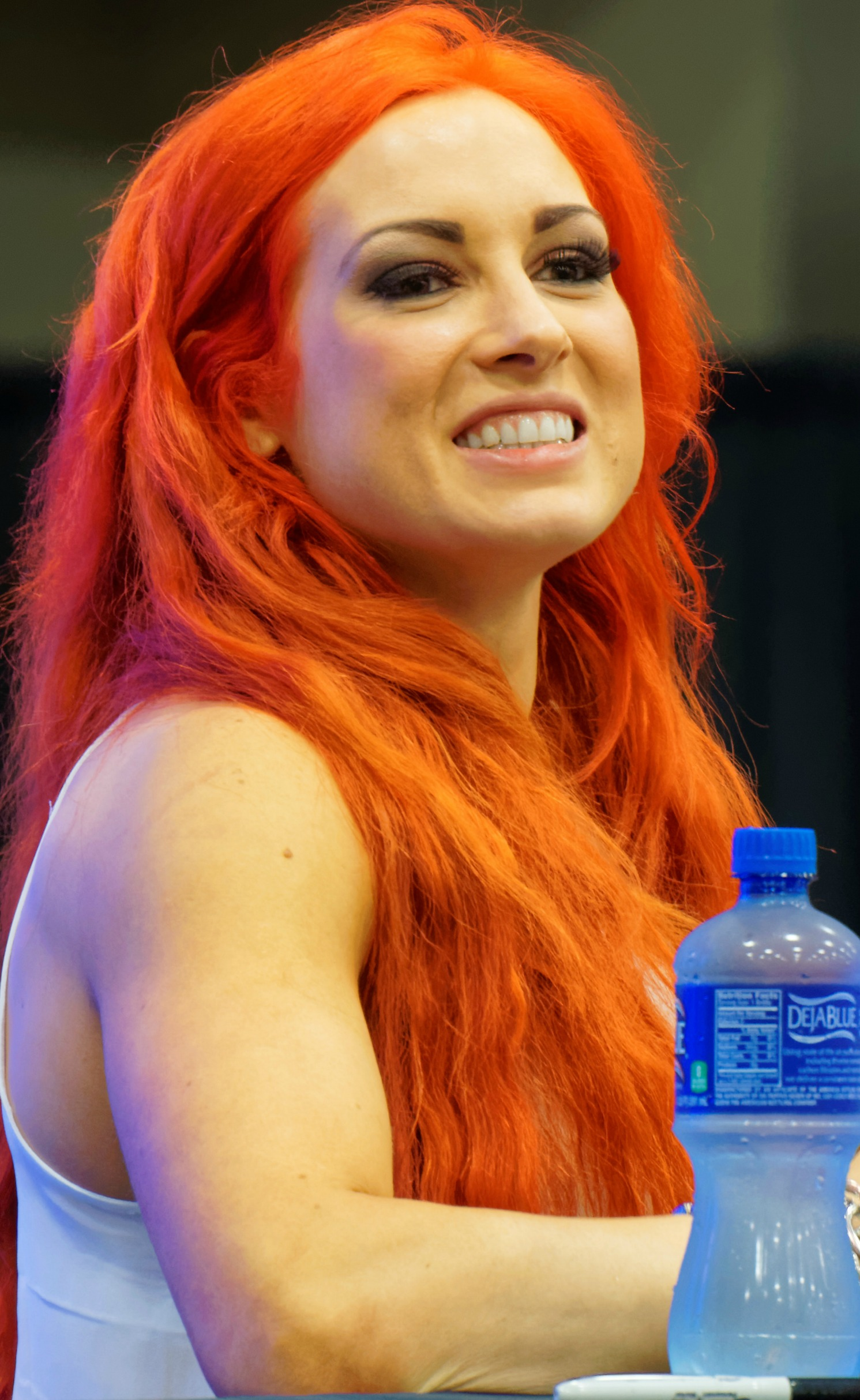
Inaugural Women's World Champion Becky Lynch, who won the title as the SmackDown Women's Championship

The Women's World Championship is the fourth women's world championship established by WWE and is currently the women's championship of the Raw brand. Originally introduced as the SmackDown Women's Championship, its creation came as a result of the reintroduction of the brand extension in July 2016, after reigning WWE Women's Champion Charlotte Flair was drafted to the Raw brand, making that championship exclusive to Raw, where it was renamed the Raw Women's Championship. In response, SmackDown created the SmackDown Women's Championship on August 23, 2016. The inaugural champion was Becky Lynch. As a result of the 2023 WWE Draft, the championships switched brands despite their namesakes. The Raw Women's Championship, now on SmackDown, reverted to its original unbranded name while the SmackDown Women's Championship was renamed as the Women's World Championship on the June 12, 2023 episode of Raw.

==== NXT UK Women's Championship (2018–2022) ====
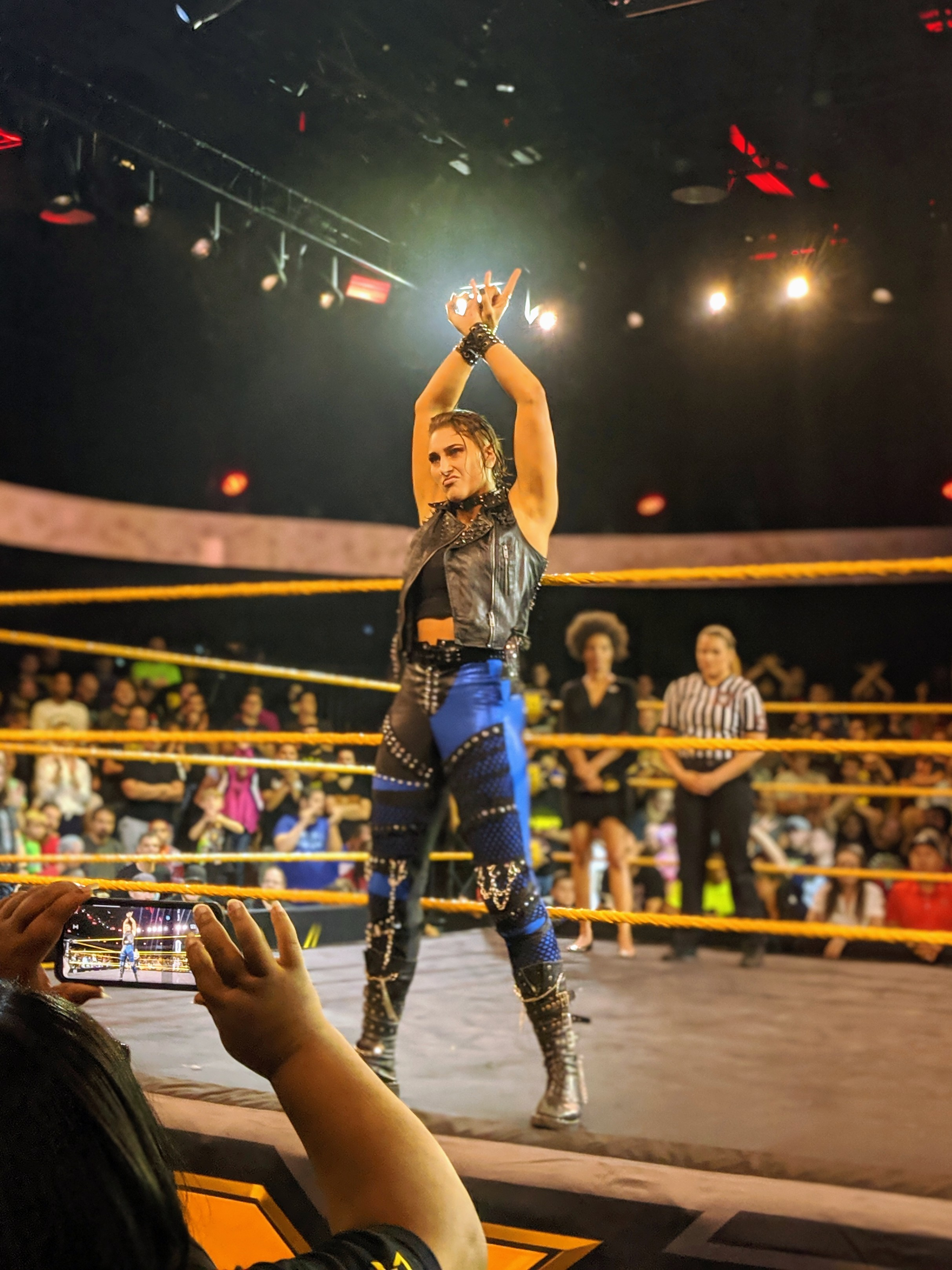
Inaugural NXT UK Women's Champion Rhea Ripley

The NXT UK Women's Championship was the women's championship of NXT UK, a sister brand of NXT based in the United Kingdom. Established in 2018, the inaugural champion was Rhea Ripley. After the announcement of the closure of NXT UK, the title was unified into the NXT Women's Championship at Worlds Collide in September 2022. Meiko Satomura is recognized as the final champion.

==== NXT Women's North American Championship (2024–present) ====
At NXT Stand & Deliver on April 6, 2024, the WrestleMania week event for WWE's developmental brand NXT, the NXT Women's North American Championship was announced by the brand's General Manager Ava. This title will be the equivalent to the men's NXT North American Championship, marking the first-ever secondary women's championship in WWE. At Week 2 of Spring Breakin', Ava announced that the inaugural champion will be crowned at Battleground in a six-woman ladder match. The inaugural champion was Kelani Jordan.

==== WWE Women's Speed Championship (2024–present) ====
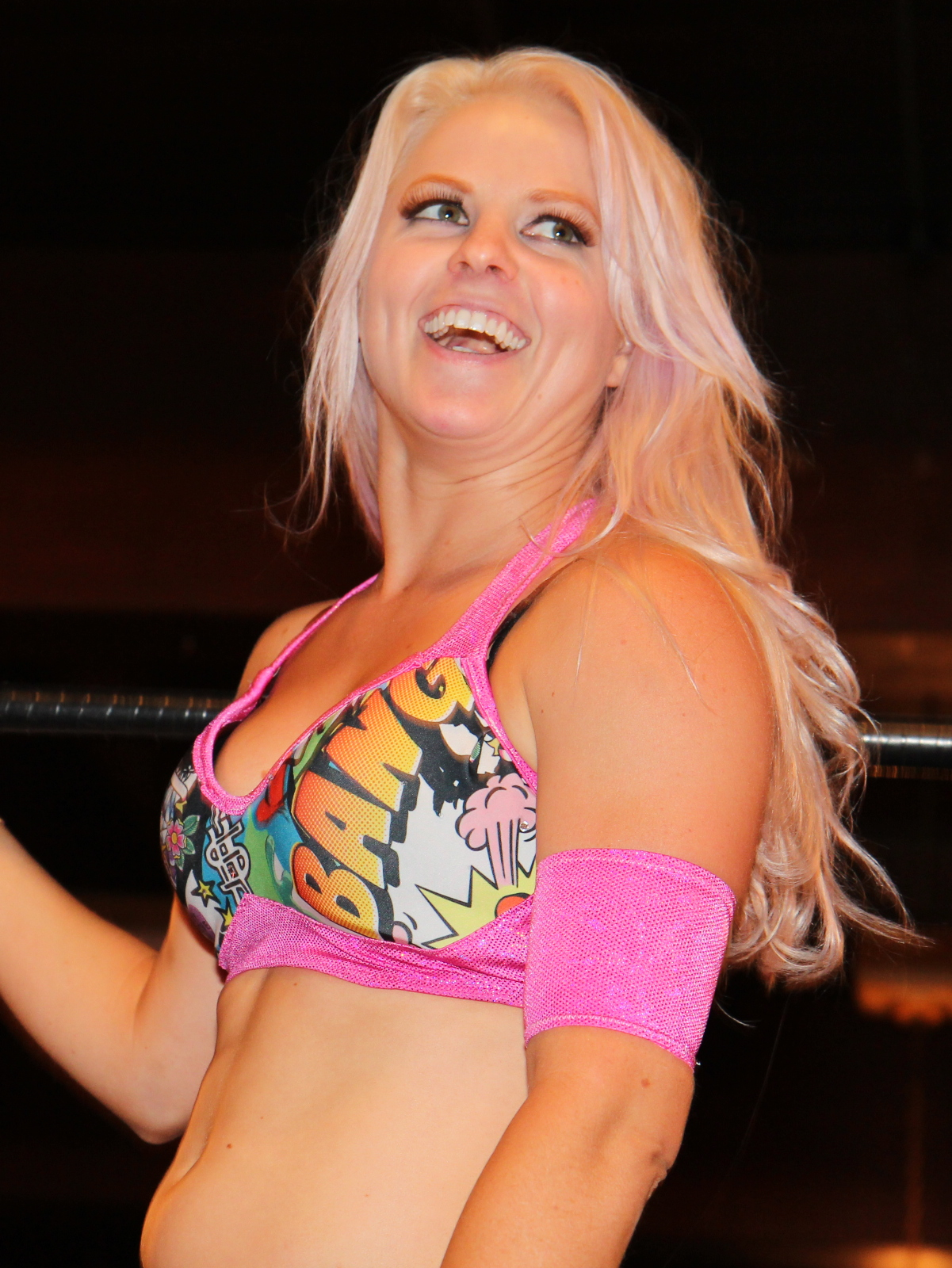
Inaugural WWE Women's Speed Champion Candice LeRae

On February 9, 2024, the American professional wrestling promotion WWE announced a partnership with X to introduce WWE Speed, a weekly video series to stream exclusively on the social media platform where wrestlers would perform in matches with a five-minute time limit, which originally featured matches with only male wrestlers from its premiere episode. On May 1, 2024, WWE Chief Content Officer Triple H confirmed that the program would also eventually feature women's matches; this led to an official announcement on August 9, 2024, where he announced that the tournament for the championship will begin on September 4, 2024. In the tournament final that occurred during the Speed tapings on October 4, 2024, SmackDown's Candice LeRae defeated Raw's Iyo Sky to become the inaugural champion.

==== WWE Women's Crown Jewel Championship (2024–present) ====
The WWE Women's Crown Jewel Championship was introduced by Triple H as an annual prize for the winner of a champion vs champion match as part of the annual event in Saudi Arabia. The championship belt is kept at the WWE Experience exhibit while the champion is presented with a ring. The first champion was crowned on November 2, 2024, where Liv Morgan the Women's World Champion defeated the WWE Women's Champion Nia Jax for the championship.

==== WWE Women's United States Championship (2024–present) ====
The WWE Women's United States Championship is a secondary women's championship established for the SmackDown brand. The title was introduced on December 14, 2024, by SmackDown general manager Nick Aldis.

On December 14, 2024, Saturday Night's Main Event where Chelsea Green was crowned the inaugural WWE Women's United States Champion when she defeated Michin in the WWE Women's United States Championship Tournament finals.

==== WWE Women's Intercontinental Championship (2024–present) ====
The WWE Women's Intercontinental Championship is a secondary women's championship established for the Raw brand. The title was introduced on November 25, 2024, by Raw general manager Adam Pearce.

On the January 13, 2025 episode of Raw Lyra Valkyria defeated Dakota Kai to become the inaugural WWE Women's Intercontinental Champion in the tournament finals.

==== WWE Women’s ID Championship (2025–present) ====
Triple H introduced a new WWE Women's Championship called the WWE Women's ID Championship on February 18, 2025, for WWE ID, an Independent Development (ID) program.

On August 1, 2025 at Game Changer Wrestling: The ID Showcase, Kylie Rae defeated Zara Zakher and Zayda Steel in a triple threat match to become the inaugural champion.

==== WWE Evolve Women’s Championship (2025–present) ====
Triple H introduced a new WWE Evolve Women's Championship on May 7, 2025, classified as a developmental championship for women by general manager Stevie Turner on WWE Evolve.

On May 28, 2025 Kali Armstrong became the inaugural WWE Evolve Women's Champion by last eliminating Kylie Rae in a women's elimination fatal four-way match which also featured Kendal Grey and Wendy Choo who were also eliminated and former WWE Divas Champion and WWE Women's World Champion Natalya presented the champion to Kali Armstrong after the match.

=== Tag team championships ===
==== WWF Women's Tag Team Championship (1983–1989) ====
The WWF Women's Tag Team Championship was the company's first women's tag team championship, established in 1983. In 1983, reigning NWA Women's World Tag Team Champions Velvet McIntyre and Princess Victoria joined the WWF. As the WWF had withdrawn from the NWA, which owned the championship, McIntyre and Victoria were recognized as the first WWF Women's Tag Team Champions. The championship continued until 1989, when the promotion abandoned it due to lack of performers in the division. The Glamour Girls (Leilani Kai and Judy Martin) were the final champions.

==== WWE Women's Tag Team Championship (2018–present) ====
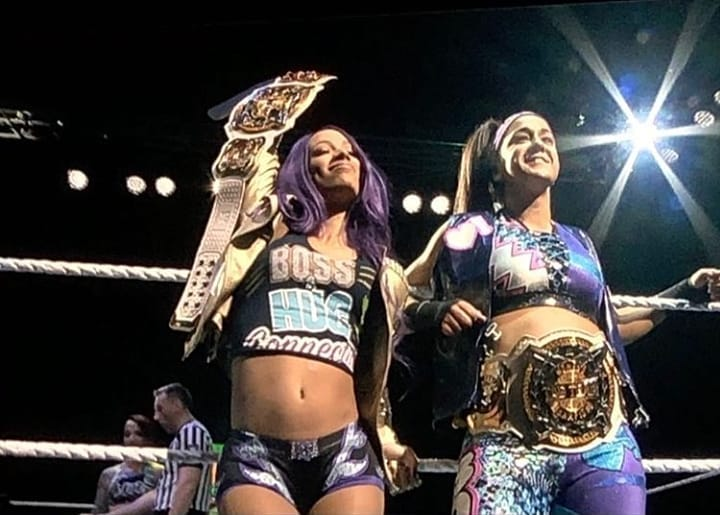
Inaugural WWE Women's Tag Team Champions The Boss 'n' Hug Connection (Sasha Banks and Bayley)

The WWE Women's Tag Team Championship was introduced on the December 24, 2018 episode of Raw and is the only women's tag team championship in WWE, shared by the Raw, SmackDown, and NXT brands. After three decades of not having a women's tag team championship and with large support from fans and female wrestlers alike, the WWE Women's Tag Team Championship was established and then debuted in 2019. The Boss 'n' Hug Connection (Bayley and Sasha Banks) became the inaugural champions at Elimination Chamber in February. The title was originally established to be defended across the Raw, SmackDown, and NXT brands. However, in March 2021, after a dispute over the title, the NXT Women's Tag Team Championship was established, thus the WWE Women's Tag Team Championship became no longer available to NXT. On the June 23, 2023 episode of SmackDown, reigning WWE Women's Tag Team Champions Ronda Rousey and Shayna Baszler defeated the reigning NXT Women's Tag Team Champions Alba Fyre and Isla Dawn in a unification match where the NXT title was unified into the WWE title, retiring the NXT title and subsequently making the WWE Women's Tag Team Championship available to NXT again.

==== NXT Women's Tag Team Championship (2021–2023) ====
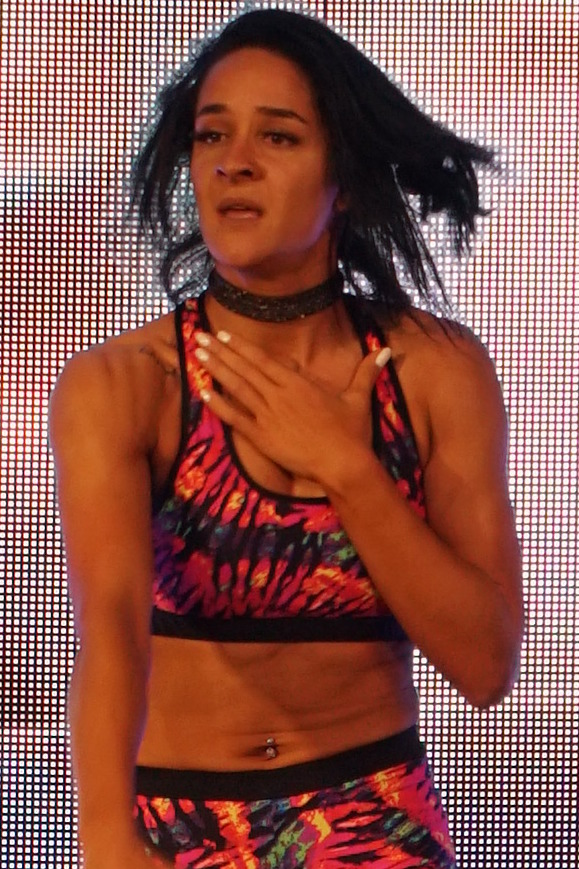
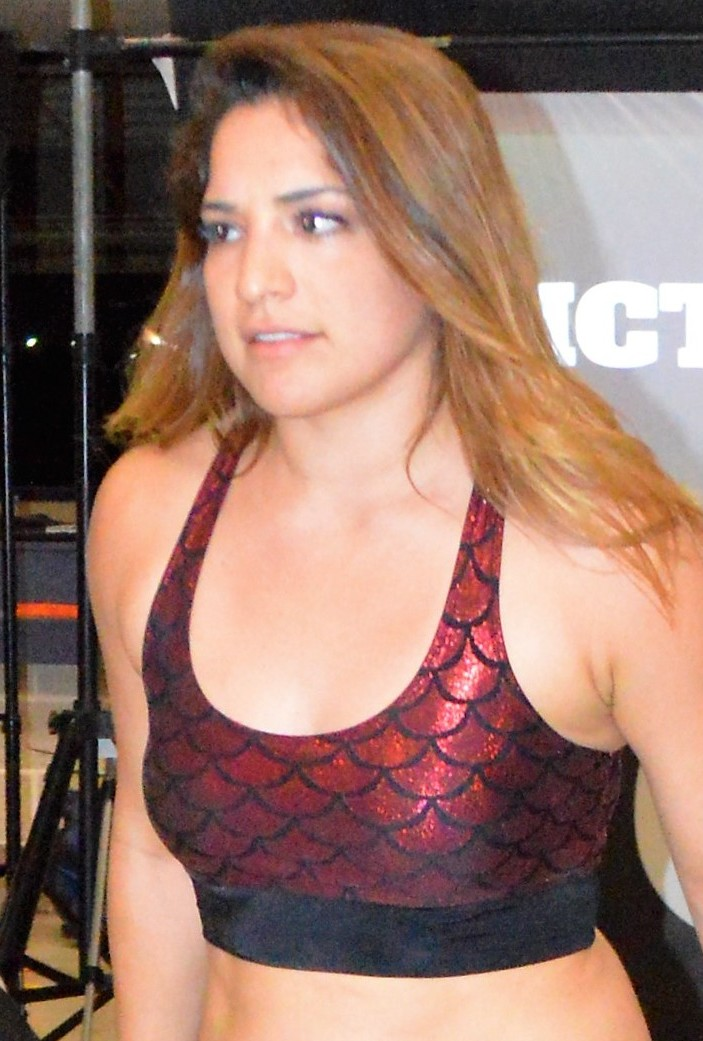
Inaugural NXT Women's Tag Team Champions Dakota Kai and Raquel González.

The NXT Women's Tag Team Championship was the women's tag team championship of WWE's developmental brand NXT. The title was established on the March 10, 2021 episode of NXT, where NXT General Manager William Regal unveiled the championship, naming Dakota Kai and Raquel González as the first champions, due to the controversial ending of their match for the WWE Women's Tag Team Championship the week prior and their having won the first Women's Dusty Rhodes Tag Team Classic. It would be a short-lived championship, as two years later on the June 23, 2023 episode of SmackDown, reigning WWE Women's Tag Team Champions Ronda Rousey and Shayna Baszler defeated reigning NXT Women's Tag Team Champions Alba Fyre and Isla Dawn in a unification match where the NXT title was unified into the WWE title, subsequently retiring the NXT title with Fyre and Dawn recognized as the final champions.

== Champions ==
=== Current champions ===
The following list shows the women wrestlers who currently hold all active women's championships in WWE.

Championship	Champion	Reign	Date won	Days held	Location	Notes
World championships
Women's World Championship	Liv Morgan	4	October 10, 2026	39+	New Orleans, Louisiana	Defeated Becky Lynch and Stephanie Vaquer in a triple threat match at Money in the Bank.
WWE Women's Championship (current version)	Tiffany Stratton	2	November 7, 2026	11+	Riyadh, Saudi Arabia	Defeated Chelsea Green at Crown Jewel; this was Stratton's Money in the Bank cash-in match.
WWE Women's Crown Jewel Championship	Chelsea Green	1	November 7, 2026	N/A	Riyadh, Saudi Arabia	Defeated Liv Morgan in a champion vs. champion match at Crown Jewel.
Mid-division championships
WWE Women's Intercontinental Championship	Iyo Sky	1	November 16, 2026	2+	Raleigh, North Carolina	Defeated Raquel Rodriguez on Raw.
WWE Women's United States Championship	Jacy Jayne	1	August 14, 2026	96+	Boston, Massachusetts	Defeated Tiffany Stratton on SmackDown.
Tag team championships
WWE Women's Tag Team Championship	Michin and B-Fab	1	October 23, 2026	26+	Ontario, California	Defeated Alexa Bliss and Tatum Paxley on SmackDown.
Developmental championships
NXT Women's Championship	Kelani Jordan	1	August 30, 2026	80+	Edinburg, Texas	Defeated Kendal Grey at Heatwave.
WWE Women's ID Championship	Monica Monroe	1	October 3, 2026	46+	Texas City, Texas	Defeated Laynie Luck in a Winner Takes All match also for Monroe's ROW Women's Championship; this was a Reality of Wrestling event.
WWE Evolve Women's Championship	Nikkita Lyons	1	May 29, 2026	173+	Orlando, Florida	Defeated Wendy Choo at Evolve: Succession III.
Developmental mid-division championships
NXT Women's North American Championship	Zaria	1	June 9, 2026	162+	Orlando, Florida	Defeated Tatum Paxley on NXT.

=== Retired championships ===
The following list shows retired women's championships and the final female title holders before the belts were deactivated in WWE.

Championship	Final champion(s)	Reign	Date retired	Days held	Notes
Singles championships
WWE Women's Championship (original version)	Layla	1	September 19, 2010	131	The championship was unified into the WWE Divas Championship. Michelle McCool defended the title in place of Layla in the unification match.
WWE Divas Championship	Charlotte Flair	1	April 3, 2016	196	The championship was retired and replaced by a new WWE Women's Championship.
Tag team championships
WWF Women's Tag Team Championship	The Glamour Girls (Judy Martin and Leilani Kai)	2 (2, 2)	February 14, 1989	251	The championship was abandoned due to a lack of female tag teams.
Developmental championships
WWE Women's Speed Championship	Wren Sinclair	1	August 30, 2026	166	The championship was unified into the NXT Women's North American Championship. Zaria won the title unification match but Sinclair was recognized as the final champion.
NXT UK Women's Championship	Meiko Satomura	1	September 4, 2022	451	The championship was unified into the NXT Women's Championship. The actual length of Satomura's reign is undeterminable as the actual date she won the title is unknown. The number shown is what WWE recognizes based on air dates.
Developmental tag team championships
NXT Women's Tag Team Championship	Alba Fyre and Isla Dawn	1 (1, 1)	June 23, 2023	83	The championship was unified into the WWE Women's Tag Team Championship.

=== Inaugural championship holders ===
The following list shows the inaugural holders for each women's championship created and/or promoted by WWE.

Championship	Holder(s)	Date	Notes
World championships
WWE Women's Championship (original version)	The Fabulous Moolah	September 18, 1956	On this date, Moolah became the third NWA World Women's Champion. WWE claims this date as the creation of their title and does not recognize any title changes of the National Wrestling Alliance's (NWA) title until Moolah lost it in 1984. Shortly before Moolah lost the title, the WWF bought the rights to the title and renamed it WWF Women's Championship. Wendi Richter is the first woman to win the title under the WWF banner.
WWE Divas Championship	Michelle McCool	July 20, 2008	
WWE Women's Championship (current version)	Charlotte Flair	April 3, 2016	
Women's World Championship	Becky Lynch	September 11, 2016	Won the title as the SmackDown Women's Championship.
Mid-division championships
WWE Women's Intercontinental Championship	Lyra Valkyria	January 13, 2025	
WWE Women's United States Championship	Chelsea Green	December 14, 2024	
WWE Women's Speed Championship	Candice LeRae	October 4, 2024	
Tag team championships
WWF Women's Tag Team Championship	Princess Victoria and Velvet McIntyre	May 13, 1983	They were the reigning NWA World Women's Tag Team Champions of the National Wrestling Alliance (NWA), but became the inaugural WWF Women's Tag Team Champions upon joining the WWF.
WWE Women's Tag Team Championship	The Boss 'n' Hug Connection (Bayley and Sasha Banks)	February 17, 2019	
Developmental World championships
NXT Women's Championship	Paige	May 30, 2013	WWE recognizes that Paige won the title on June 5, 2013, when the match aired on tape delay.
NXT UK Women's Championship	Rhea Ripley	August 26, 2018	WWE recognizes that Ripley won the title on November 28, 2018, when the match aired on tape delay.
WWE Women's ID Championship	Kylie Rae	August 1, 2025	
WWE Evolve Women's Championship	Kali Armstrong	May 28, 2025	
Developmental mid-division championships
NXT Women's North American Championship	Kelani Jordan	June 9, 2024	
Developmental tag team championships
NXT Women's Tag Team Championship	Dakota Kai and Raquel González	March 10, 2021	

== Superlative reigns ==
=== Ten longest ===
==== World championships ====
The following list shows the top 10 recognized longest women's championship reigns in WWE history. This does not include the Fabulous Moolah's first reign as WWF Women's Champion as it was not under the WWF banner.

No.	Champion	Title	Reign	Days recognized
1	Rockin' Robin	WWF Women's Championship	1	501
2	Trish Stratus	WWE Women's Championship	6	447
3	Sherri Martel	WWF Women's Championship	1	440
4	Bianca Belair	WWE Raw Women's Championship	1	419
5	Becky Lynch	WWE Raw Women's Championship	1	398
6	Bayley	WWE SmackDown Women's Championship	2	379
7	Rhea Ripley	Women's World Championship (Note: Ripley won the Women's World Championship as the SmackDown Women's Championship. The title was renamed in June 2023 during her reign.)	1	379
8	The Fabulous Moolah	WWF Women's Championship	7	379
9	Alundra Blayze	WWF Women's Championship	2	348
10	Tiffany Stratton	WWE Women's Championship	1	302

==== Tag team championships ====
The following list shows the top 10 longest women's tag team championship reigns in WWE history.

No.	Champion	Title	Reign	Length (days)	Notes
1	The Glamour Girls (Judy Martin and Leilani Kai)	WWF Women's Tag Team Championship	1	906	
2	Velvet McIntyre and Princess Victoria	WWF Women's Tag Team Championship	1	574	McIntyre and Victoria were the reigning NWA Women's World Tag Team Champions upon the WWF's withdrawal from the National Wrestling Alliance and were recognized as the first WWF Women's Tag Team Champions, which ended the lineage of the NWA title.
3	The Glamour Girls (Judy Martin and Leilani Kai)	WWF Women's Tag Team Championship	2	251	
4	Desiree Petersen and Velvet McIntyre	WWF Women's Tag Team Championship	1	237	
5	Katana Chance and Kayden Carter	NXT Women's Tag Team Championship	1	186	
7	Bianca Belair and Jade Cargill/Naomi	WWE Women's Tag Team Championship	2/1	177 (104/73)	Naomi replaced injured Jade Cargill as one-half of the Women's Tag Team Champions. WWE recognizes it as one uninterrupted reign.
6	The Kabuki Warriors (Asuka and Kairi Sane)	WWE Women's Tag Team Championship	1	171 or 172	The event that they lost the title was taped across two days, and it is not known which date they lost the titles. WWE recognizes The Kabuki Warriors' reign as lasting 180 days due to tape delay.
8	Toxic Attraction (Gigi Dolin and Jacy Jayne)	NXT Women's Tag Team Championship	1	158	
9	The Jumping Bomb Angels (Itsuki Yamazaki and Noriyo Tateno)	WWF Women's Tag Team Championship	1	136	
10	Carmella and Queen Zelina	WWE Women's Tag Team Championship	1	132	

=== Longest per championship ===
The following list shows the longest reigning champion for each singles and tag team women's championship.

No.	Champion	Title	Reign	Dates held	Length (days)	Notes
1	The Fabulous Moolah	WWE Women's Championship (original version)	1	September 18, 1956 – September 17, 1966	3,651	During this reign, the title was known as the NWA World Women's Championship and was renamed the WWF Women's Championship when the WWF bought the rights to the championship in 1984. WWE recognizes this reign as lasting 10,170 days (September 18, 1956 – July 23, 1984) as they do not recognize the title changes of the NWA World Women's Championship between 1956 and 1984.
2	The Glamour Girls (Judy Martin and Leilani Kai)	WWF Women's Tag Team Championship	1	August 1, 1985 – January 24, 1988	906	
3	Kay Lee Ray	NXT UK Women's Championship	1	August 31, 2019 – June 10, 2021	649	The actual date that she lost the title is unknown, but WWE recognizes 649 days due to tape delay.
4	Asuka	NXT Women's Championship	1	April 1, 2016 – August 24, 2017	510	WWE recognizes this reign as lasting 523 days (April 1, 2016 – September 6, 2017) due to tape delay.
5	Bianca Belair	WWE Women's Championship (current version)	1	April 2, 2022 – May 27, 2023	420	WWE recognizes this reign as lasting 419 days. During this reign, the title was known as the Raw Women's Championship.
6	Bayley	Women's World Championship	2	October 11, 2019 – October 25, 2020	380	WWE recognizes this reign as lasting 379 days. During this reign, the title was known as the SmackDown Women's Championship.
6	Rhea Ripley	Women's World Championship	1	April 1, 2023 – April 15, 2024	380	WWE recognizes this reign as lasting 379 days. She won the title as the SmackDown Women's Championship. The title became the Women's World Championship on June 12, 2023.
7	Nikki Bella	WWE Divas Championship	2	November 23, 2014 – September 20, 2015	301	WWE recognizes this reign as lasting 300 days.
8	Sol Ruca	NXT Women's North American Championship	1	April 19, 2025 – October 25, 2025	189	
9	Katana Chance and Kayden Carter	NXT Women's Tag Team Championship	1	August 2, 2022 – February 4, 2023	186	
10	The Kabuki Warriors (Asuka and Kairi Sane)	WWE Women's Tag Team Championship	1	October 6, 2019 – March 25 or 26, 2020	172 or 171	The event that they lost the title was taped across two days, and it is not known which date they lost the titles. WWE recognizes The Kabuki Warriors' reign as lasting 180 days (October 6, 2019 – April 4, 2020) due to tape delay.

=== Most per championship ===
The following list shows the wrestlers with the most reigns for each women's championship created and/or promoted by WWE.

No.	Champion	Title	No. of Reigns	Notes
1	Trish Stratus	WWE Women's Championship (original version)	7	In reality, The Fabulous Moolah had the most reigns at 8. She first won the championship when it was called the NWA World Women's Championship and it was renamed the WWF Women's Championship when the WWF bought the rights to the championship in 1984, which was what the title was known as for her subsequent reigns. However, WWE only recognizes that Moolah held the championship four times as they do not recognize the title changes of the NWA World Women's Championship from 1956 to 1984. During Stratus' first reign, the title was known as the WWF Women's Championship.
2	Charlotte Flair	Women's World Championship	7	During all seven of her reigns, the title was known as the SmackDown Women's Championship.
3	Charlotte Flair	WWE Women's Championship (current version)	6	During her second through sixth reigns, the title was known as the Raw Women's Championship. She was also the inaugural holder of the title.
4	Raquel Rodriguez	WWE Women's Tag Team Championship	6	
5	AJ Lee	WWE Divas Championship	3	
5	Eve Torres	WWE Divas Championship	3	
6	Charlotte Flair	NXT Women's Championship	2	
6	Shayna Baszler	NXT Women's Championship	2	
6	Roxanne Perez	NXT Women's Championship	2	
6	Jacy Jayne	NXT Women's Championship	2	
7	Dakota Kai and Raquel González	NXT Women's Tag Team Championship	2	
7	Toxic Attraction (Gigi Dolin and Jacy Jayne)	NXT Women's Tag Team Championship	2	
8	The Glamour Girls (Judy Martin and Leilani Kai)	WWF Women's Tag Team Championship	2	
9	Kay Lee Ray	NXT UK Women's Championship	1	There were only four reigns by four women during the title's four-year existence.
9	Meiko Satomura	NXT UK Women's Championship	1	There were only four reigns by four women during the title's four-year existence.
9	Rhea Ripley	NXT UK Women's Championship	1	There were only four reigns by four women during the title's four-year existence.
9	Toni Storm	NXT UK Women's Championship	1	There were only four reigns by four women during the title's four-year existence.
10	Kelani Jordan	NXT Women's North American Championship	1	
10	Fallon Henley	NXT Women's North American Championship	1	
10	Stephanie Vaquer	NXT Women's North American Championship	1	
10	Sol Ruca	NXT Women's North American Championship	1	
10	Blake Monroe	NXT Women's North American Championship	1	
10	Thea Hail	NXT Women's North American Championship	1	
10	Izzi Dame	NXT Women's North American Championship	1	
10	Tatum Paxley	NXT Women's North American Championship	1	
10	Zaria	NXT Women's North American Championship	1	
11	Candice LeRae	WWE Women's Speed Championship	1	
11	Sol Ruca	WWE Women's Speed Championship	1	
11	Fallon Henley	WWE Women's Speed Championship	1	
11	Wren Sinclair	WWE Women's Speed Championship	1	
12	Chelsea Green	WWE Women's United States Championship	2	
12	Giulia	WWE Women's United States Championship	2	
13	Becky Lynch	WWE Women's Intercontinental Championship	3	
14	Kali Armstrong	WWE Evolve Women's Championship	1	
14	Kendal Grey	WWE Evolve Women's Championship	1	
14	Wendy Choo	WWE Evolve Women's Championship	1	
14	Nikkita Lyons	WWE Evolve Women's Championship	1	

=== Most total reigns ===
==== Singles championships ====
The following list shows the wrestlers who have the most reigns in total for women's singles championships, combining all titles they have held as recognized by WWE. This list also shows the titles that they won to achieve this record (minimum of five reigns).

No.	Champion	Titles	No. of reigns	Notes
1	Charlotte Flair	NXT Women's Championship (2 times); WWE Divas Championship (1 time); WWE Women's Championship (current version, 6 times); Women's World Championship (7 times)	16	Flair was the last Divas Champion and the inaugural WWE Women's Champion, with the latter known as the Raw Women's Championship from her second through sixth reigns. During her reigns with the Women's World Championship, the title was known as the SmackDown Women's Championship. She is also the only woman to have held as many different championships. In terms of women's world championships, Flair is a 14-time world champion as the NXT Women's Championship is not considered a world championship retroactive to her 2nd reign with the title.
2	Becky Lynch	Women's World Championship (5 times); WWE Women's Championship (current version, 2 times); NXT Women's Championship (1 time); WWE Women's Intercontinental Championship (3 times)	11	During her first four reigns with the Women's World Championship, the title was known as the SmackDown Women's Championship and she was the inaugural champion. During her reigns with the WWE Women's Championship, the title was known as the Raw Women's Championship. Lynch is the only wrestler to have held both titles at the same time.
3	Sasha Banks	NXT Women's Championship (1 time); WWE Women's Championship (current version, 5 times); Women's World Championship (1 time)	7	During her second through fifth reigns with the WWE Women's Championship, the title was known as the Raw Women's Championship. During her reign with the Women's World Championship, the title was known as the SmackDown Women's Championship.
3	Trish Stratus	WWE Women's Championship (original version, 7 times)	7	During her first reign, the title was known as the WWF Women's Championship.
5	Mickie James	WWE Women's Championship (original version, 5 times); WWE Divas Championship (1 time)	6	James is an 11-time world champion but WWE does not recognize her five TNA Knockouts World Championship reigns.
6	Rhea Ripley	NXT UK Women's Championship (1 time); NXT Women's Championship (1 time); WWE Women's Championship (current version, 1 time); Women's World Championship (2 times)	5	
6	Alexa Bliss	WWE Women's Championship (current version, 3 times); Women's World Championship (2 times)	5	During her reigns with the WWE Women's Championship, the title was known as the Raw Women's Championship. During her reigns with the Women's World Championship, the title was known as the SmackDown Women's Championship. Bliss was the first wrestler to have won both titles.
6	Melina	WWE Women's Championship (original version, 3 times); WWE Divas Championship (2 times)	5	
6	Asuka	NXT Women's Championship (1 time); WWE Women's Championship (current version, 3 times); Women's World Championship (1 time)	5	During her first two reigns with the WWE Women's Championship, the title was known as the Raw Women's Championship; it reverted to WWE Women's Championship during her third reign. During her reign with the Women's World Championship, the title was known as the SmackDown Women's Championship.
6	Bayley	NXT Women's Championship (1 time); WWE Women's Championship (current version, 2 times); Women's World Championship (2 times)	5	During her first reign with the WWE Women's Championship, the title was known as the Raw Women's Championship. During her reigns with the Women's World Championship, the title was known as the SmackDown Women's Championship.

==== World Championships ====
WWE considers the original WWE Women's Championship (established in 1956 and deactivated in 2010), the current WWE Women's Championship (active since 2016), Women's World Championship and WWE Divas Championship as the women's division's WWE World Championships. The following list shows the wrestlers who have the most reigns in total for women's world singles championships, combining all titles they have held as recognized by WWE. This list also shows the titles that they won to achieve this record (minimum of four reigns).

No.	Champion	Titles	No. of reigns	Notes
1	Charlotte Flair	WWE Divas Championship (1 time); WWE Women's Championship (current version, 6 times); Women's World Championship (7 times)	14	Flair was the last Divas Champion and the inaugural WWE Women's Champion, with the latter known as the Raw Women's Championship from her second through sixth reigns. During her reigns with the Women's World Championship, the title was known as the SmackDown Women's Championship.
2	Becky Lynch	Women's World Championship (5 times); WWE Women's Championship (current version, 2 times)	7	Lynch was the inaugural Women's World Champion. During her first four reigns as Women's World Champion the championship was known as the WWE SmackDown Women's Championship. Both of Lynch's reigns with the WWE Women's Championships occurred when the championship was known as the WWE Raw Women's Championship.
2	Trish Stratus	WWE Women's Championship (original version, 7 times)	7	During Stratus' first reign, the title was known as the WWF Women's Championship.
3	Sasha Banks	WWE Women's Championship (current version, 5 times); Women's World Championship (1 time)	6	During her second through fifth reigns with the WWE Women's Championship, the title was known as the Raw Women's Championship. During her reign with the Women's World Championship, the title was known as the SmackDown Women's Championship. Banks is a 9-time world champion but WWE does not recognize her one AEW Women's World Championship reign, one CMLL World Women's Championship reign, and one IWGP Women's Championship reign.
3	Mickie James	WWE Women's Championship (original version, 5 times); WWE Divas Championship (1 time)	6	James is an 11-time world champion but WWE does not recognize her five TNA Knockouts World Championship reigns.
4	Alexa Bliss	WWE Women's Championship (current version, 3 times); Women's World Championship (2 times)	5	During her reigns with the WWE Women's Championship, the title was known as the Raw Women's Championship. During her reigns with the Women's World Championship, the title was known as the SmackDown Women's Championship. Bliss was the first wrestler to have won both titles.
4	Melina	WWE Women's Championship (original version, 3 times); WWE Divas Championship (2 times)	5	
5	Liv Morgan	Women's World Championship (4 time, current)	4	
5	Asuka	WWE Women's Championship (current version, 3 times); Women's World Championship (1 time)	4	During her first and second reign with the WWE Women's Championship, the title was known as the Raw Women's Championship. During her reign with the Women's World Championship, the title was known as the SmackDown Women's Championship.
5	Bayley	WWE Women's Championship (current version, 2 times); Women's World Championship (2 times)	4	During her first reign with the WWE Women's Championship, the title was known as the Raw Women's Championship. During her reigns with the Women's World Championship, the title was known as the SmackDown Women's Championship.
5	Beth Phoenix	WWE Women's Championship (original version, 3 times); WWE Divas Championship (1 time)	4	
5	Lita	WWE Women's Championship (original version, 4 times)	4	
5	Michelle McCool	WWE Women's Championship (original version, 2 times); WWE Divas Championship (1 time)	4	McCool was the inaugural Divas Champion. During the only reign of Layla as the Women's Champion she considered herself as co-champion and defended the title on Layla's belhaf on multiple occasions. However, McCool is not officially listed as champion alongside Layla.
5	The Fabulous Moolah	WWE Women's Championship (original version, 4 times)	4	In reality, The Fabulous Moolah had 8 reigns as the WWE Women's Champion, then as WWF Women's Champion. She first won the championship when it was called the NWA World Women's Championship and it was renamed the WWF Women's Championship when the WWF bought the rights to the championship in 1984, which was what the title was known as for her subsequent reigns. However, WWE only recognizes that Moolah held the championship four times as they do not recognize the title changes of the NWA World Women's Championship from 1956 to 1984.

==== Tag team championships ====
The following list shows the wrestlers who have the most reigns in total for women's tag team championships, combining all titles they have held as recognized by WWE. This list also shows the titles that they won to achieve this record (minimum of three reigns).

No.	Champion	Titles	No. of reigns	Notes
1	Raquel Rodriguez	NXT Women's Tag Team Championship (2 times); WWE Women's Tag Team Championship (6 times)	8	For her two reigns with the NXT Women's Tag Team Championship, she was known as Raquel González and she was one-half of the inaugural championship team. She became Raquel Rodriguez before winning her first WWE Women's Tag Team Championship.
2	Asuka	WWE Women's Tag Team Championship (5 times)	5	
2	Alexa Bliss	WWE Women's Tag Team Championship (5 times)	5	
3	Dakota Kai	NXT Women's Tag Team Championship (2 times); WWE Women's Tag Team Championship (2 times)	4	Kai was one-half of the inaugural NXT Women's Tag Team Champions.
3	Iyo Sky	NXT Women's Tag Team Championship (1 time); WWE Women's Tag Team Championship (3 times)	4	
3	Liv Morgan	WWE Women's Tag Team Championship (4 times)	4	Currently has the most reigns as a tag team with Raquel Rodriguez.
4	Nikki Cross	WWE Women's Tag Team Championship (3 times)	3	She was known as Nikki A.S.H. during her third reign.
4	Sasha Banks	WWE Women's Tag Team Championship (3 times)	3	Banks was one-half of the inaugural WWE Women's Tag Team Champions.
4	Shayna Baszler	WWE Women's Tag Team Championship (3 times)	3	
4	Kairi Sane	WWE Women's Tag Team Championship (3 times)	3	

== Most combined days as singles champions ==
The following list shows the top 10 female wrestlers based on their most combined days as singles champions in WWE history. This includes world, mid-card, and developmental championship reigns.

†	Indicates this wrestler is currently holding a championship
¤	The exact length of at least one title reign is uncertain; the combined length may not be correct

Rank	Wrestler	Titles won	Number of reigns	Combined days as champion
1	The Fabulous Moolah	WWE Women's Championship (original)	4	10,775
2	Charlotte Flair	WWE Divas Championship (1 time); NXT Women's Championship (2 times); WWE Women's Championship (current version, 6 times); Women's World Championship (7 times)	16	¤ 1,315
3	Becky Lynch	WWE Women's Championship (current version, 2 times); Women's World Championship (5 times); NXT Women's Championship (1 time); WWE Women's Intercontinental Championship (3 times)	11	1,319
4	Asuka	NXT Women's Championship (1 time); WWE Women's Championship (current version, 3 times); Women's World Championship (1 time)	5	1,007
5	Bayley	NXT Women's Championship (1 time); WWE Women's Championship (current version, 2 times); Women's World Championship (2 times)	5	937
6	Rhea Ripley	NXT UK Women's Championship (1 time); NXT Women's Championship (1 time); WWE Women's Championship (current version, 2 times); Women's World Championship (2 times)	6	¤ 876
7	Trish Stratus	WWE Women's Championship (original)	7	828
8	Iyo Sky †	NXT Women's Championship (1 time); WWE Women's Championship (current version, 1 time); Women's World Championship (1 time); WWE Women's Intercontinental Championship (1 time, current)	4	684+
9	Kay Lee Ray	NXT UK Women's Championship	1	649
10	Beth Phoenix	WWE Women's Championship (original version, 3 times); WWE Divas Championship (1 time)	4	571

== Most combined days as tag team champions ==
The following list shows the top 10 female tag teams based on their most combined days as tag team champions in WWE history.

†	Indicates these wrestlers are currently holding a championship
¤	The exact length of at least one title reign is uncertain; the combined length may not be correct

Rank	Wrestler	Titles won	Number of reigns	Combined days as champion
1	The Glamour Girls (Judy Martin and Leilani Kai)	WWF Women's Tag Team Championship	2	1,157
2	Princess Victoria and Velvet McIntyre	WWF Women's Tag Team Championship	1	574
3	The Kabuki Warriors (Asuka and Kairi Sane)	WWE Women's Tag Team Championship	3	¤326
4	Toxic Attraction (Gigi Dolin and Jacy Jayne)	NXT Women's Tag Team Championship	2	249
5	Desiree Petersen and Velvet McIntyre	WWF Women's Tag Team Championship	1	237
6	Katana Chance and Kayden Carter	NXT Women's Tag Team Championship (1 time); WWE Women's Tag Team Championship (1 time)	2	225
7	Nia Jax and Shayna Baszler	WWE Women's Tag Team Championship	2	215
8	Liv Morgan and Raquel Rodriguez	WWE Women's Tag Team Championship	4	180
9	Damage CTRL (Dakota Kai and Iyo Sky)	WWE Women's Tag Team Championship	2	162
10	The Unholy Union (Alba Fyre and Isla Dawn)	NXT Women's Tag Team Championship (1 time); WWE Women's Tag Team Championship (1 time)	2	160

== See also ==
- Women in WWE
- Tag team championships in WWE
- World championships in WWE
