= Olympia Hartauer =

American professional wrestler

Professional wrestling career
- Ring name: Olympia Hartauer; Olympia Hightower; Olympia Hartower; Olympia Hunter; Ms. Olympia; Olympia; Corporal Kelly
- Debut: 1986
- Retired: (Not completely)

Olympia Hartauer (sometimes credited as Olympia Hightower) is an American retired professional wrestler.

== Professional wrestling career ==
=== Gorgeous Ladies of Wrestling ===
Olympia began her wrestling career in 1986 as a competitor on the Gorgeous Ladies of Wrestling television series. She was the original of the two women that portrayed the character Corporal Kelly, hand picked by executive producer Matt Cimber. Her character was a militant heel that often competed in tag team matches with her sidekick and tag team partner, Attache. Olympia left GLOW in 1987.

Being trained first in California by Mando Guerrero of the well known Guerrero Bros, Olympia later went on after GLOW to be trained by The Fabulous Moolah in Columbia, South Carolina.

=== World Wrestling Federation ===
After leaving GLOW, Olympia joined the World Wrestling Federation under her real name in the fall of 1987. She repackaged her character as an all-American patriotic babyface dressed in red, white, and blue attire. She defeated Judy Martin in a series of singles matches. She also competed in tag team matches with partners Velvet McIntyre and Debbie Combs against Martin and her partner Leilani Kai (who, as the Glamour Girls, were the reigning WWF Women's Tag Team Champions), but lost each match.

=== American Wrestling Association ===
In January 1988, Olympia joined the American Wrestling Association under the name Ms. Olympia. She maintained her patriotic babyface gimmick and began competing to become the top contender for the AWA World Women's Championship, which was held at the time by Madusa Miceli. She competed in several matches against Candi Devine and former tag team partner Debbie Combs (who was now aligned with Miceli), but was unsuccessful in gaining the championship. Her last match in the AWA was against Wendi Richter (who had defeated Miceli for the championship) in March 1989. Although Olympia didn't win every match she engaged in, there were countless that she did win in the U.S. as well as in Canada, Italy, Germany and Austria.

=== Later career ===
Olympia continued to wrestle sporadically on the independent circuit after leaving the AWA. She competed in the Delta Tiger Lilies in 1988 and later joined the Women's Pro Wrestling organization in the early 1990s prior to her retirement from wrestling. During 2007, Olympia returned to the ring (after getting married and having children and wrestled for SuperGirls Wrestling (which promotes in conjunction with NWA: Extreme Canadian Championship Wrestling).

== Championships and accomplishments ==
- Delta Tiger Lillies
  - Delta Tiger Lillies Six Person Tag Team titles (1 time) - with Ashley Ryan & Bambi
