= Penny Mitchell =

Greek professional wrestler (born 1961)

Personal information
- Born: 1961 (age 64–65) Springfield, Missouri

Professional wrestling career
- Ring name(s): Penny Mitchell; Spider-Lady
- Trained by: The Fabulous Moolah
- Debut: 1980
- Retired: 1993

Penny Mitchell (1961) is a retired American female professional wrestler.

== Professional wrestling career ==
Mitchell was trained by the Fabulous Moolah and made her wrestling debut in 1980. In 1982, Mitchell made her WWF debut. She unsuccessfully challenged Moolah for the Women's Championship. During her time in the WWF she mainly teamed with Sherri Martel, Kandy Mallory, Peggy Patterson and Susan Starr.

She won the NWA World Women's Tag Team Championship with Velvet McIntyre in May 1983 defeating Joyce Grable and Wendi Richter. They vacated the titles in February 1984 when both women returned to the WWF.

From 1983 to 1984, Mitchell worked for All Japan Women's Pro Wrestling.

In 1985, Mitchell feuded with Desiree Petersen in the WWF. She wore a mask as the Spider Lady having matches with Susan Starr and WWF Women's Champion Wendi Richter in the summer and fall of 1985. The Fabulous Moolah took over the Spider-Lady when she defeated Richter in the infamous screw job at Madison Square Garden in November 1985. In 1986 she teamed with Candice Purdue having matches against The Glamour Girls.

In 1987, she worked in Kansas City. In 1993 she retired from wrestling.

== Championships and accomplishments ==
- National Wrestling Alliance
  - NWA World Women's Tag Team Championship (1 time) – with Velvet McIntyre
