= Don Owen =

Don Owen may refer to:

- Don Owen (filmmaker) (1935–2016), Canadian filmmaker
- Don Owen (wrestling) (1912–2002), American professional wrestling promoter
  - Don Owen Sports, his promotional company, popularly known as Pacific Northwest Wrestling
