= Sandy Barr =

American professional wrestler, referee, promoter, trainer

Personal information
- Born: Ferrin Charles Barr; January 21, 1938 Oregon, U.S.
- Died: June 2, 2007 (aged 69) Portland, Oregon, U.S.
- Family: Art Barr (son); Ferrin Barr, Jr. (son)

Professional wrestling career
- Ring name: Sandy Barr
- Debut: March 5, 1957

Ferrin Charles Barr (January 21, 1938 – June 2, 2007) was an American professional wrestler, referee, promoter and trainer who spent his career mostly in the Western United States and Canada. Under the name Sandy Barr, he was best known for his presence in the Portland, Oregon wrestling scene.

== Professional wrestling career ==
Barr got his start in wrestling working with Cliff Thiede from Idaho Falls, Idaho. He wrestled his first match on March 5, 1957, in Hot Springs, Idaho against Treacherous Phillips to a time limit draw. He spent his time wrestling Idaho, Utah, Nevada, Arizona, Washington, Oregon and Canada.

Barr began refereeing matches for Pacific Northwest Wrestling promoter Don Owen in the 1960s because it allowed him to spend more time at home with his family. As a promoter, Barr was known as a person who would take care of the wrestlers. Tom "The Dynamite Kid" Billington said of Barr, "The only time he made anything was once a year when all the big names came in, like Harley Race and André the Giant, and then they'd do great business. Sold out every night. Sandy would be so excited about making all this money, after he'd paid the big names, he gave the rest of it to us, the wrestlers who were there every week. All year long he'd be scraping by, and, when he did make some money, he gave it away. But he was a very good, kindhearted man, a great man—especially for a promoter."

Barr spent much of his later life as a referee, promoter, and trainer, training wrestlers such as Jimmy Jack Funk (Jesse Barr), Matt Borne (the first Doink the Clown), Art Barr, Velvet McIntyre and Princess Victoria. While largely retired from being an active wrestling performer, Barr continued to get back into the ring on occasion, wrestling his last match just a few days prior to his death.

== Personal life ==
After Don Owen bought an old bowling alley and converted it into the Portland Sports Arena, Barr worked out a deal with Owen where he would hold a flea market in the arena when it was not being used for wrestling.

He is the father of Art Barr, who would go on to fame in Mexico as American Love Machine, and Jesse Barr, who gained some level of fame teaming with Dory and Terry Funk as Jimmy Jack Funk.

On June 2, 2007, Sandy Barr died of a heart attack while at his flea market in North Portland; he was 69 years old. Following Sandy's death, his son Josh Barr continued running the promotion until the license expired later that year. Upon the expiration of the license, all of the equipment was sold and the Barrs left the Wrestling business.
