= Leilani Kai =

American professional wrestler (born 1960)

Personal information
- Born: Patty Seymour; January 23, 1960 (age 66) Tampa, Florida, U.S.

Professional wrestling career
- Ring name(s): Leilani Kai; Patty Stone Grinder
- Billed height: 5 ft 7 in (1.70 m)
- Billed weight: 162 lb (73 kg)
- Billed from: Honolulu, Hawaii
- Trained by: The Fabulous Moolah
- Debut: 1975
- Retired: December 11, 2015

Patty Seymour (born January 23, 1960) is an American retired professional wrestler, best known by her ring name Leilani Kai. She is best known for her work in All Japan Women's Pro Wrestling (AJW) and the World Wrestling Federation (WWF) from the 1980s to the 1990s. She is currently signed to World Wrestling Entertainment (WWE) under a legends contract.

== Professional wrestling career ==
=== Early career (1975–1985) ===
Seymour began training with The Fabulous Moolah in 1975 after she finished high school. Originally from Florida, Moolah thought Seymour looked Hawaiian therefore she was given the ring name Leilani Kai, as in the Hawaiian language Leilani translates to "heavenly flowers" and Kai translates to "ocean water". Her fellow wrestlers also bestowed upon her the nickname "The Hawaiian Princess" during her early career. Four weeks after she began her training Moolah sent Kai on a two-week tour of Alaska, over the next few years she worked through multiple promotions throughout the United States including; California, Minnesota, New York and Oklahoma. In 1979, in North Carolina, Kai began working with Judy Martin, who would be her future tag team partner. Early in her career Kai was tag team partners with The Fabulous Moolah, her first recorded match was a tag team match on the 20 June 1975, in which she and Moolah defeated Sheila Shepherd and Sue Green. Throughout the 1970s Kai faced multiple women including Donna Christanello, Joyce Grable, Judy Mansfield, Kitty Adams, Sylvia Hackney, Terri Shane, Toni Rose, Vivian St. John and most notably Vicki Williams who she feuded with through the majority of 1975. In 1977 she faced The Fabulous Moolah in a losing effort, in her first singles championship match for the NWA World Women's Championship. She began tag teaming with Pepper LaBianco in 1978 where they challenged for the NWA World Women's Tag Team Championship on multiple occasions.

=== All Japan Women's Pro Wrestling (1980–1986) ===
On 17 May 1980 Kai wrestled her first match for AJW in a 6-woman tag team match, teaming with Joyce Grable and Mami Kumano in a no contest against Ayumi Hori, Jackie Sato and Lucy Kayama. Kai's first singles match for the promotion saw her face Mami Kumano which ended in a double count out. Kai wrestled for AJW until June 1980, sometimes wrestling for 8 to 9 days in a row. She returned to the promotion briefly in February 1981 before debuting for the World Wrestling Federation in March 1981.

Kai made sporadic returns to Japan between the years of 1982–1984, including appearing on the 14 June 1982 episode, where she returned to the company teaming with Devil Masami and Wild Kazuki defeating the team of Lioness Asuka, Mimi Hagiwara and Yukari Omori. In 1984 she briefly returned once again to the company, defeating Itsuki Yamazaki in a singles match and forming a tag team with Devil Masami. In August 1986 Kai defeated Japanese wrestling legend Chigusa Nagayo winning the All Japan Women's Pro Wrestling's All Pacific Championship in an infamously brutal match. She lost the title back to Nagayo in an April 1987 rematch. Kai and Nagayo's matches are known for being ahead of their time, being noted as wrestling classics. Kai was one of only four American women to hold the All Pacific Championship, alongside Jane O'Brien, Judy Martin and Reggie Bennett, her 249-day reign with the championship was the eighth longest reign in the championships history. Kai has been regarded as one of the greatest female wrestlers of the 80s.

=== World Wrestling Federation (1981–1989) ===
Kai made her debut for the WWF on March 27, 1981, where she and The Fabulous Moolah defeated the team of Jill Fontaine and Suzette Ferreira, Kai and Moolah entered a feud with Fontaine and Ferreira, appearing regularly for the WWF. Majority of Kai's matches in her early WWF career consisted of tag team matches alongside Moolah, the villainous duo feuded with multiple different female tag teams. She continued to make various appearances for American Wrestling Association, Georgia Championship Wrestling, Mid-Atlantic Championship Wrestling and Mid South Wrestling among other territories. She began working with different women wrestlers including; Black Venus, Peggy Lee, Princess Victoria, Velvet McIntyre and Wendi Richter. In 1983 she, alongside The Fabulous Moolah, were involved in a long feud with Princess Victoria and Susan Starr trading victories back and forth. She briefly teamed with Despina Montagas, defeating the then WWF World Women's Tag Team Champions; Princess Victoria and Velvet McIntyre in a non-title match, on the 29 August 1984 episode, of WWF Championship Wrestling. Kai and Montagas would lose their tag team championship match against Victoria and McIntyre, three days later.

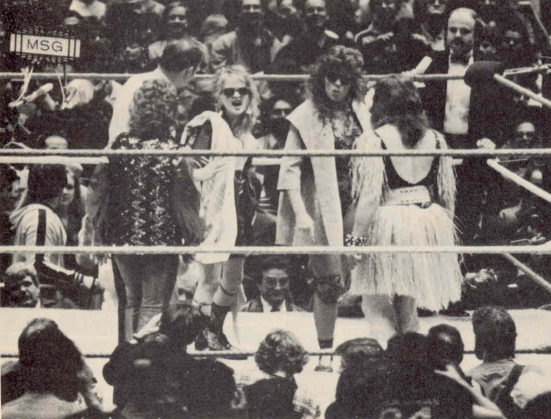
Wendi Richter and Cyndi Lauper (back) face off against Leilani Kai and The Fabulous Moolah (front, facing away) at WrestleMania I

On July 23, 1984, Wendi Richter defeated The Fabulous Moolah at MTV's The Brawl to End it All special for the WWF World Women's Championship, ending what was billed as the longest championship reign in professional wrestling history. As a result, in early 1985, Kai who had been trained by Moolah, challenged Richter and defeated her for the WWF Women's Championship at The War to Settle the Score, in Madison Square Garden, with Moolah in her corner and Cyndi Lauper in Richter's corner. On the March 8, 1985 episode, of WWF Tuesday Night Titans, she was interviewed by Vince McMahon on her championship win. Kai and Richter feuded, involving American singer, songwriter Cyndi Lauper managing Richter and Moolah managing Kai. Kai defeated Richter multiple times on WWF house shows, their feud culminated when Kai lost the belt to Richter at the first-ever WrestleMania in the semi-main event. Their match was a part of the WWF's Rock 'n' Wrestling Connection, an era of wrestling that combined both mainstream music and professional wrestling. Kai and Richter's feud was seen as a main event attraction due to the involvement of Richter's valet, Cyndi Lauper, which was rare for women's wrestling in the mid-1980s. Kai went on to challenge Richter for the title multiple times but failed to regain the belt.

Kai was then paired with Judy Martin, the duo won the WWF Women's Tag Team Championship from the team of Desiree Petersen and Velvet McIntyre in Egypt in August 1985. Kai and Martin went on to feud with multiple women's tag teams including; Candice Pardue and Penny Mitchell, and the team of Angie Minelli and Theresa DuBois. In June 1987 they began feuding with The Jumping Bomb Angels (Itzuki Yamazaki and Noriyo Tateno) competing in multiple tag team matches, in November 1987 Kai and Martin officially became known as The Glamour Girls, undergoing an image change involving bleaching her dark hair platinum blonde and being managed by Jimmy Hart. The duo competed at the first Survivor Series pay-per-view a part of then champion's Sherri Martel's team alongside Dawn Marie and Donna Christanello, losing to The Fabulous Moolah's team, consisting of The Jumping Bomb Angels, Rockin' Robin and Velvet McIntyre. Kai and Martin continued to feud with The Jumping Bomb Angels, facing the team in a two out of three falls match at the 1988 Royal Rumble event, in which The Jumping Bomb Angels defeated The Glamour Girls capturing the WWF Women's Tag Team Championship. Kai and Martin recaptured the title months later in June 1988 at an AJW event. Infamously Kai reported The Fabulous Moolah told Kai and Martin they were regaining the tag team championship belts as ordered by WWF higher-ups, once Kai and Martin won the belts, Pat Patterson called them telling them they had "screwed up" the WWF's plans and that they had lost out on a match at WrestleMania V, which would have been all four wrestlers biggest pay days to date. Kai and Martin held the tag team championship belts until 1989, when they were defunct after the company lost interest in having a women's division.

=== Ladies Professional Wrestling Association (1990–1991) ===
The Glamour Girls resurfaced in the newly founded Ladies Professional Wrestling Association (LPWA) being managed by Adnan El Kassey. In February 1991, they won the LPWA Tag Team Championship from the team of Heidi Lee Morgan and Misty Blue. They retained the titles against Bambi and Malia Hosaka at the only LPWA pay-per-view Superladies Showdown in 1992. The championship was abandoned when the promotion closed.

=== World Championship Wrestling (1991, 1996–1997, 1999) ===
In 1991, Kai made multiple appearances for WCW losing to Bambi and losing to Madusa on an episode of WCW Main Event. She returned again sporadically between 1996 and 1997 losing to Madusa on several house shows. She appeared on the March 22, 1997 episode, of WCW Saturday Night, in a losing effort to Malia Hosaka, after the match Kai and Hosaka were both attacked by Luna Vachon.

She lost to Madusa on the July 26, 1999, episode of WCW Monday Nitro where she performed under the ring name Patty Stone Grinder. Her final televised appearances with the company were in backstage segments on the November 29, 1999 episode, of WCW Monday Nitro with Rhonda Singh in the women's locker room, and in a food fight with Fyre and Paisley, resulting in Kai choking on her food before being saved by Juventud Guerrera. Kai was booked to wrestle Brandi Alexander or Mona, on an episode of WCW Monday Nitro in late 1999. Once she arrived to the building she was greeted by Vince Russo, who informed Kai she was facing her opponent in a mud-match for a segment involving Lex Luger and Miss Elizabeth. Kai infamously stood up to Russo telling him to go and fuck himself, refusing to wrestle in a mud-match. Bret Hart, agreeing with and defending Kai, witnessed the altercation. Kai grabbed her belongings and left the arena, refusing to work for the WCW ever again.

=== Return to World Wrestling Federation (1994) ===
In 1994, Kai made a brief return to the WWF after a year of inactivity in wrestling, challenging then WWF Women's Champion, Alundra Blayze. Kai and Blayze had several matches at WWF house shows. Kai went on to face Blayze at WrestleMania X for the WWF Women's Championship in a losing effort. Kai was the only wrestler to wrestle on both WrestleMania I and WrestleMania X. She faced Blayze multiple times on house shows in the following months, before exiting the WWF again in May 1994.

=== Independent circuit and retirement (1991–2015, present) ===
Between the years of 1991 to her retirement in 2004 Kai worked mostly on the independent circuit. Kai traded the NWA Mid-Atlantic Women's Championship with Strawberry Fields in 2000, holding the belt a total of three times. In the summer of 2002 she challenged Lexie Fyfe for the Professional Girl Wrestling Association's (PGWA) championship and won the belt, later that year Pippa L'Vinn defeated Kai for the title. On March 12, 2003, she defeated Madison to win the NWA World Women's Championship in a dark match on a TNA pay-per-view. She successfully defended the championship at the NWA 55th Anniversary Show against AJ Sparx in October 2003. She was later stripped of the championship by then NWA President Bill Behrens on June 19, 2004, after Kai no-showed several events.

On September 5, 2013, it was announced that Kai would debut at Pro Wrestling Syndicate Bombshells against Sumie Sakai, she was defeated by Sakai on September 28. In May 2014 Kai defeated Chelsea Diamond for the FCW Women's Championship, that same month she appeared on West Coast Wrestling Connection slapping Kylie Sutton for implying she was old. The following week Kai was scheduled to face Sutton in a match, but after refusing to participate, she forced her manager Jonny Fairplay to take her place. Sutton won the match by disqualification after Kai entered the ring attacking her before referees pulled her off. Her final match was a losing effort to Leah Von Dutch at the SHINE 31 pay-per-view in December 2015, she subsequently retired from professional wrestling.

After becoming less active in-ring, she began training female wrestlers including Amber O'Neal. She served as a trainer for the California-based Women of Wrestling. In 2016 Kai was officially inducted to the Professional Wrestling Hall of Fame, in 2024 she was inducted in to the St. Louis Wrestling Hall of Fame.

In 2026, Kai began accompanying her nephew Luke Fury to the ring at independent wrestling events.

=== Second return to WWE (2025–present) ===
On May 24, 2025, Kai was shown in the crowd alongside several legends during WWE's Saturday Night's Main Event XXXIX, event marking her first appearance for the WWE in over 30 years. It was later announced she had signed an official legends contract with the company.

She made a second appearance on July 13, during the Evolution pay-per-view, being officially recognized as one of the pioneers of WWE's women's evolution alongside; Alundra Blayze, Ivory, Jacqueline, Jazz, Maryse, Melina, Molly Holly, Stephanie McMahon, Torrie Wilson and Vickie Guerrero. After the event she received her first ever professional wrestling t-shirt, which sold out from WWE.com in less than a month. Kai has since appeared on various episodes of NXT since September 2025. She has stated she would like to become a coach at WWE's Performance Centre, and that she's a fan of Bianca Belair, Blake Monroe, Chelsea Green and Iyo Sky.

== Personal life ==
In addition to professional wrestling, Seymour has trained with nunchucks. She previously lived in Hawaii and with the Von Erich family, who she remains close with.

On September 18, 2024, she underwent successful right hip replacement surgery. She is still close friends with former tag team partner Judy Martin and WWE Hall of Famer Shawn Michaels.

== Filmography ==
Film and television
Year	Title	Role	Notes
1985	WWF Tuesday Night Titans	Leilani Kai; guest	1 episode
1994	LPWA the Super Ladies: Volume 1	Leilani Kai	Direct to video
2018	Then, Now, Forever: Evolution of WWE's Women's Division	Leilani Kai	Documentary, archive footage
2018	350 Days - Legends. Champions. Survivors.	Self; special thanks	Documentary
2019	Dark Side of the Ring season 1	Self; special thanks	1 episode
2025	WWE's Greatest Moments	Self; feature	1 episode

Video games
Year	Title	Role	Notes
2024	WWE SuperCard	Leilani Kai	Video game debut

WWE video compilations
Year	Title	Role	Notes
1985	The WWF's Amazing Managers	Leilani Kai	Direct to video
1985	Highlights of WrestleMania	Leilani Kai	Direct to video
1986	Best of the WWF Volume 5	Leilani Kai	Direct to video
1987	The WWF's Even More Unusual Matches	Leilani Kai	Direct to video
1987	Best of the WWF Volume 12	Leilani Kai	Direct to video
1988	Best of the WWF Volume 15	Leilani Kai	Direct to video
1988	The Women of WWF	Leilani Kai	Direct to video
1989	WWF High Flyers	Leilani Kai	Direct to video
1995	WWF 1994: The Year in Review	Leilani Kai	Direct to video
2009	WWE: Survivor Series Anthology Volume 1	Leilani Kai	Direct to DVD
2018	Then, Now, Forever: Evolution of WWE's Women's Division	Leilani Kai	Direct to DVD

== Championships and accomplishments ==
- All Japan Women's Pro-Wrestling
  - All Pacific Championship (1 time)
- Cauliflower Alley Club
  - Tag Team Award (2026) – with Judy Martin
- Ladies Professional Wrestling Association
  - LPWA Tag Team Championship (1 time) – with Judy Martin
- National Wrestling Alliance
  - NWA World Women's Championship (1 time)
  - NWA World Women's Tag Team Championship (2 times) – with Judy Martin
  - NWA Hall of Fame (Class of 2006)
- NWA Mid-Atlantic
  - NWA Mid-Atlantic Women's Championship (3 times)
- New Dimension Wrestling
  - NDW Women's Championship (1 time)
- Professional Girl Wrestling Association
  - PGWA Championship (1 time)
  - Penny Banner Spirit of Excellence Award (2001)
- Professional Wrestling Hall of Fame
  - Class of 2016
- St. Louis Wrestling Hall of Fame
  - Class of 2024
- Ultimate Championship Wrestling
  - UCW Women's Championship (1 time)
- World Wrestling Federation
  - WWF Women's Championship (1 time)
  - WWF Women's Tag Team Championship (2 times) – with Judy Martin
