= The Glamour Girls =

Professional wrestling tag team

Tag team
- Members: Judy Martin; Leilani Kai
- Name(s): The Glamour Girls; The Queen's Court; The Queen and his Court
- Billed heights: Kai: 5 ft 7 in (1.70 m); Martin: 5 ft 6 in (1.68 m)
- Debut: 1985
- Disbanded: 1992
- Years active: 1985–1992

The Glamour Girls were a female professional wrestling tag team. The members were Judy Martin and Leilani Kai.

== History ==
=== Early career and training ===
Leilani Kai was trained by The Fabulous Moolah in 1975 right after she finished high school at Lillian Ellison School of Professional Wrestling. It was in 1979, that Kai first began working with Judy Martin, who at also trained at Moolah's school and would become her tag team partner. During this time, in addition to wrestling individually and as a tag team (including tours of Japan with the All Japan Women's Pro-Wrestling promotion), Kai and Martin worked behind the scenes as trainers at Moolah's school, where they (along with Joyce Grable) oversaw training of women such as Wendi Richter and Sherri Martel.

=== World Wrestling Federation ===
Kai and Martin competed together as a tag team in the World Wrestling Federation. They were awarded the WWF Women's Tag Team Championship from champions Velvet McIntyre and Desiree Petersen in 1985 (although sources claim a match occurred between the two teams in August 1985 in Egypt).

After touring on the independent circuit and Japan for a few years, Martin and Kai returned to the WWF in 1987, repackaged as the platinum haired The Glamour Girls and were managed by "The Mouth of the South" Jimmy Hart. According to Kai, Hart had actually approached both Martin and herself at a hotel pool and told them that he liked the way they worked together, but that their look was a little too old school. He suggested they both dye their hair blonde, wear gold and black outfits and just basically change their image. He also told them that he would be willing to become their manager which was a big deal since it gave the women's division one of the leading male managers in professional wrestling (at the time it was more usual for women to be valets for male wrestlers and rare for a leading male manager to be involved in the women's division). The duo appeared at the first Survivor Series in 1987 as part of then champion Sherri Martel's team to face the Fabulous Moolah's team.

They spent much of 1988 feuding with the Jumping Bomb Angels for the WWF Women's Tag Team Championship. The Jumping Bomb Angels defeated them for the championship at the first Royal Rumble in 1988. Kai and Martin recaptured the title months later in Japan before the belts were abandoned.

The Glamour Girls regaining the Tag Team titles from the Jumping Bomb Angels was not received well by the WWF and its head booker Pat Patterson. What had happened was prior to the tour of Japan, Martin and Kai had a falling out with The Fabulous Moolah over her no longer receiving a portion of their booking fees. Moolah then sabotaged them by going behind the WWF's back and informing the Japanese promoters that The Glamour Girls were to win the Tag Team belts in the last match of the tour. The girls did query this and tried to contact Patterson by telephone but were unable to do so and agreed to win the belts. When they returned to the US, they were confronted by Patterson who informed them that they had totally screwed up the WWF's plans and that nobody within the WWF had made the decision for the title change. According to both Martin and Kai, he then refused to listen to them when told that it was Moolah who had ordered the title change. The plans Patterson had mentioned was a tag team championship match at Wrestlemania V between the Bomb Angels and Glamour Girls. The match was scrapped, ultimately costing all 4 women what would have been their largest pay day and the Women's Tag Team Championship was abandoned in mid-1989.

While working for the WWF, the duo (who were experienced trainers) were often paired against rookies and younger, more inexperienced women (including Rockin' Robin, Baby Doll, and Olympia Hartauer) in try-out matches to help the WWF gauge their talent and potential.

=== Later career ===
In 1990, the duo joined the Ladies Major League Wrestling promotion, where they held the LMLW Tag Team Championship. While in LMLW, they were managed by Abdullah Farouk, Jr. They competed as a tag team and also become contenders for the LMLW World Championship.

In the fall 1991, Kai and Martin joined World Championship Wrestling and feuded with Madusa and Bambi in singles matches. The women's division in WCW was phased out before they were given any opportunity to compete together as a tag team.

During this time they also competed in the Ladies Professional Wrestling Association. They debuted under the new name, the Queen's Court, and were managed by Queen Christopher Love (and eventually Adnan Al-Kaissie). They wrestled as both a tag team and in singles competition as top contenders to the LPWA Championship held by Susan Sexton. After months of feuding with reigning champions Team America (Misty Blue Simmes and Heidi Lee Morgan), they finally captured the LPWA Tag Team Championship. They feuded with teams such as Bad, Black, & Beautiful (Black Venus and Bad Girl), The New Team America (Misty Blue Simmes and Alison Royal), Locomotion (Reggie Bennett and Cheryl Rusa), Wendi Richter and Rockin' Robin, and Bambi and Malia Hosaka. At the only LPWA pay-per-view, LPWA Super Ladies Showdown, the Glamour Girls defended the LPWA Tag Team Championship against Bambi and Hosaka.

While working in LPWA, Kai and Martin were credited with helping to train and develop many of the rookies and younger talent, including Malia Hosaka and Terri Power.

== Retirement ==
Martin retired from professional wrestling in 1999, while Kai retired in 2015. The duo currently makes appearances at various wrestling conventions and reunions, mainly located on the east coast.

== Championships and accomplishments ==
- Cauliflower Alley Club
  - Tag Team Award (2026)
- Ladies Major League Wrestling
  - LMLW Tag Team Championship (1 time)
- Ladies Professional Wrestling Association
  - LPWA Tag Team Championship (1 time)
- National Wrestling Alliance
  - NWA World Women's Tag Team Championship (2 times)
- World Wrestling Federation
  - WWF Women's Tag Team Championship (2 times, final)
