= Princess Victoria (wrestler) =

Canadian professional wrestler (born 1962)

Personal information
- Born: Vickie Otis; May 5, 1962 (age 64) Portland, Oregon, U.S.

Professional wrestling career
- Ring name: Princess Victoria
- Billed height: 5 ft 8 in (173 cm)
- Billed weight: 145 lb (66 kg)
- Billed from: Vancouver, British Columbia, Canada
- Trained by: Sandy Barr; The Fabulous Moolah
- Debut: 1980
- Retired: 1984

Vickie Otis (born May 5, 1962) is an American retired professional wrestler, better known by her ring name, Princess Victoria.

== Professional wrestling career ==
Otis was trained in Portland, Oregon, by Sandy Barr. She feuded with another of Barr's trainees, Velvet McIntyre. The two women competed against each other in singles and tag team matches in Vancouver All Star Wrestling.

=== National Wrestling Alliance (1980–1983) ===
Both women continued their feud while working for NWA Pacific Northwest under promoter Don Owen. They eventually ended their feud and formed a tag team. The duo won the WWF Women's Tag Team Championship on May 13, 1984, in Calgary, Alberta.

=== World Wrestling Federation (1983–1984) ===
In 1983, the World Wrestling Federation withdrew from the National Wrestling Alliance, and when McIntyre and Victoria rejoined the promotion in 1984, they were immediately recognized as holding the WWF Women's Tag Team Championship. The duo defended the championship against the team of Wendi Richter and Peggy Lee multiple times, including a match on April 23, 1984, in Madison Square Garden. On September 1, 1984, Otis suffered a career-ending neck injury defending the tag team titles in Philadelphia. The title she held was retired shortly thereafter. Desiree Petersen later replaced Victoria when she was let go from the WWF in 1984.

While in the WWF, she also wrestled in singles matches as a challenger against WWF Women's Champion The Fabulous Moolah who was also responsible for training her, and booking her, which she discussed in detail while appearing on The Fabulous Moolah episode of Dark Side of the Ring.

== Retirement ==
In 2012, Desiree Peterson and Princess Victoria managed pro-wrestler Rescue 911 (Christopher Annino) and Lady Liberty (Nikki Moccia) at a Showcase Pro Wrestling event in Clinton, Connecticut for Cystic Fibrosis awareness. Prior to her move to Washington Victoria lived in Virginia and volunteered her time at South Hampton County Animal Shelter. Otis is retired from professional wrestling and now resides in Washington.

In July 2016, Otis was named part of a class action lawsuit filed against WWE which alleged that wrestlers incurred traumatic brain injuries during their tenure and that the company concealed the risks of injury. The suit was litigated by attorney Konstantine Kyros, who has been involved in a number of other lawsuits against WWE. According to her, due to WWE’s lack of medical attention, she is fully disabled and sometimes has to use a wheelchair. In September 2018, the lawsuit was dismissed by US District Judge Vanessa Lynne Bryant.

She appeared an episode of the Vice Media production Dark Side of The Ring.

== Filmography ==
Television
| Year | Title | Role | Notes |
|---|---|---|---|
| 2019 | Dark Side of the Ring | Herself | Season 1 episode 6: "The Fabulous Moolah", Season 5 episode 7: "Chris Adams: The Gentleman and the Demon" |

== Championships and accomplishments ==
- Cauliflower Alley Club
  - Women's Wrestling Award (2018)
- National Wrestling Alliance
  - NWA United States Women's Championship (1 time)
  - NWA World Women's Tag Team Championship (1 time) – with Sabrina
- World Wrestling Federation
  - WWF Women's Tag Team Championship (1 time, inaugural) – with Velvet McIntyre
