= WWF Women's Tag Team Championship =

Professional wrestling championship

- A belt that represented the WWF Women's Tag Team Championship,

Details
- Promotion: World Wrestling Federation (WWF)
- Date established: May 13, 1983
- Date retired: February 14, 1989
Statistics
- First champions: Velvet McIntyre and Princess Victoria
- Final champions: The Glamour Girls (Leilani Kai and Judy Martin)
- Most reigns: As a tag team (2 reigns): The Glamour Girls (Leilani Kai and Judy Martin); As individual (2 reigns): Leilani Kai; Judy Martin; Velvet McIntyre
- Longest reign: The Glamour Girls (Leilani Kai and Judy Martin) (1st reign, 906 days)
- Shortest reign: The Jumping Bomb Angels (Noriyo Tateno and Itsuki Yamazaki) (136 days)
- Oldest champion: Judy Martin (32 years, 244 days)
- Youngest champion: Velvet McIntyre (20 years, 170 days)
- Heaviest champion: Velvet McIntyre and Desiree Petersen (315 lb (143 kg) combined)
- Lightest champion: Velvet McIntyre and Princess Victoria (295 lb (134 kg) combined)

The WWF Women's Tag Team Championship was a women's professional wrestling tag team title in the World Wrestling Federation (WWF, now WWE). The belief its holders were considered world champions was expressed by Jesse Ventura, an announcer for some of its defenses. Velvet McIntyre and Princess Victoria were recognized as the inaugural champions when they came to the promotion in 1983 as the National Wrestling Alliance's World Women's Tag Team Champions. The final champions were The Glamour Girls (Leilani Kai and Judy Martin) when the titles were abandoned in 1989.

== History ==
In 1983, the team of Velvet McIntyre and Princess Victoria joined the World Wrestling Federation (WWF, now WWE) as the reigning NWA World Women's Tag Team Champions. The WWF had since withdrawn from the National Wrestling Alliance (NWA), and the rights to the championship were owned by The Fabulous Moolah. The WWF in turn bought the rights to the championship from Moolah, and recognized McIntyre and Victoria as the first WWF Women's Tag Team Champions. This ended the lineage of the World Women's Tag Team Championship, though the WWF continued to use the championship belts of the former title to represent their new title. After six years, the championship was abandoned in 1989, with The Glamour Girls (Leilani Kai and Judy Martin) as the final champions. This happened largely due to the lack of tag teams in the women's division, and a lack of female performers in general.

During the December 24, 2018, episode of Monday Night Raw, WWE Chairman and Chief Executive Officer Vince McMahon announced that a new WWE Women's Tag Team Championship would be introduced in 2019. It does not carry the lineage of the original title.

== Reigns ==
Over the course of the championship's six-year history, there were five reigns between four championship teams, composed of seven individual champions. The inaugural championship team was Velvet McIntyre and Princess Victoria. The Glamour Girls (Leilani Kai and Judy Martin) had the most reigns as a team at two, while individually, Kai, Martin, and McIntyre had the most reigns, also at two. The Glamour Girls' first reign was the longest reign at 909 days, and they had the longest combined reign at 1,157 days. The Jumping Bomb Angels (Noriyo Tateno and Itsuki Yamazaki) had the shortest reign at 136 days. McIntyre was the youngest champion when she was recognized as one-half of the inaugural championship team at 20 years old, while the oldest was Martin when she won the championship at 32 for her second reign.

Key
No.	Overall reign number
Reign	Reign number for the specific team—reign numbers for the individuals are in parentheses, if different
Days	Number of days held

No.	Champion	Championship change			Reign statistics		Notes	Ref.
No.	Champion	Date	Event	Location	Reign	Days	Notes	Ref.
National Wrestling Alliance: World Wrestling Federation (WWF)
1	Princess Victoria and Velvet McIntyre	May 13, 1983	House show	Calgary, Alberta, Canada	1	574	McIntyre and Princess Victoria were the reigning World Women's Tag Team Champions upon the WWF's withdrawal from the National Wrestling Alliance and were recognized as the first WWF Women's Tag Team Champions. The team's first match in the WWF took place on April 4, 1984, in Rochester, New York.	
World Wrestling Federation (WWF)
2	Desiree Petersen and Velvet McIntyre	December 7, 1984	House show	Pittsburgh, PA	1 (1, 2)	237	Princess Victoria suffered a career-ending neck injury on September 1, 1984, in Philadelphia, Pennsylvania. Petersen took her place as McIntyre's partner. This was considered a second reign for McIntyre.	
3	The Glamour Girls (Judy Martin and Leilani Kai)	August 1, 1985	House show	Cairo, Egypt	1	906		
4	The Jumping Bomb Angels (Itsuki Yamazaki and Noriyo Tateno)	January 24, 1988	Royal Rumble	Hamilton, Ontario, Canada	1	136	This was a two out of three falls match.	
5	The Glamour Girls (Judy Martin and Leilani Kai)	June 8, 1988	AJW House show	Ōmiya-ku, Saitama, Japan	2	251	The Glamour Girls won the championship by countout on an AJW card.	
—	Deactivated	February 14, 1989	—	—	—	—	The championship was abandoned. In 2019 a new WWE Women's Tag Team Championship was introduced, but it does not carry the lineage of this title.	

== Combined reigns ==
=== By team ===
Rank	Team	No. of reigns	Combined days
1	The Glamour Girls (Judy Martin and Leilani Kai)	2	1,157
2	Princess Victoria and Velvet McIntyre	1	574
3	Desiree Petersen and Velvet McIntyre	1	237
4	The Jumping Bomb Angels (Itzuki Yamazaki and Noriyo Tateno)	1	136

=== By wrestler ===
Rank	Wrestler	No. of reigns	Combined days
1	Leilani Kai	2	1,157
1	Judy Martin	2	1,157
3	Velvet McIntyre	2	811
4	Princess Victoria	1	574
5	Desiree Petersen	1	237
6	Itzuki Yamazaki	1	136
6	Noriyo Tateno	1	136

== See also ==
- List of former championships in WWE
- Tag team championships in WWE
- Women's championships in WWE

Sporting positions
Preceded by First	WWE's women’s tag team championship 1983–1989	Succeeded by WWE Women's Tag Team Championship
