= Velvet McIntyre =

Irish-Canadian professional wrestler (born 1962)

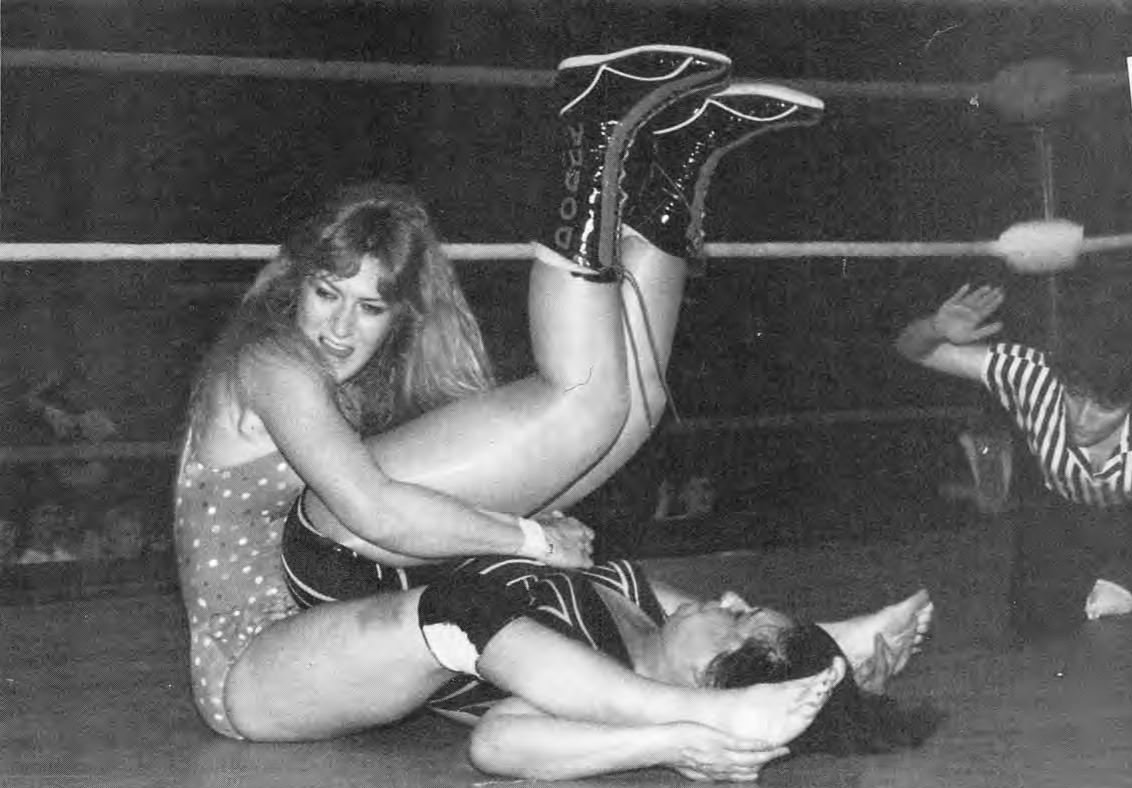
- McIntyre (left) pinning Donna Christanello (right), circa 1988

Personal information
- Born: November 24, 1962 (age 63) Dublin, Ireland
- Children: 2

Professional wrestling career
- Ring name: Velvet McIntyre
- Billed height: 5 ft 10 in (178 cm)
- Billed weight: 150 lb (68 kg)
- Billed from: Dublin, Ireland
- Trained by: Sandy Barr
- Debut: 1980
- Retired: 1998

Velvet McIntyre (born November 24, 1962) is a Irish retired professional wrestler. After beginning her career in 1980, she wrestled in American independent promotions before joining the World Wrestling Federation (WWF, now WWE). She had rivalries with both The Fabulous Moolah and Sherri Martel and held the WWF Women's Championship and WWF Women's Tag Team Championship. After the WWF's women's division went on hiatus in the 1990s, McIntyre wrestled in several Canadian promotions, holding several championships.

McIntyre wore wrestling boots for the first four years of her career, but later wrestled barefoot when someone took one of her boots as a joke and she was forced to wrestle without them. Wrestling barefoot subsequently became one of her trademarks, as well as her high flying wrestling maneuvers.

== Early life ==
McIntyre was born in Dublin, Ireland. She had three brothers with whom she wrestled. After finishing high school, she moved to Oregon in 1980 to train with Sandy Barr, under whom she trained with her future opponent and tag team partner, Princess Victoria.

== Professional wrestling career ==
=== Canada (1980–1984) ===
McIntyre made her professional wrestling debut in Idaho in 1980, and began wrestling full-time three months later. She then joined Vancouver's All Star Wrestling in 1981, where she feuded with Princess Victoria. She continued to feud with Victoria for the remainder of the year in both singles and tag team matches in Vancouver and the NWA Pacific Northwest under promoter Don Owen.

In 1982, she joined the World Wrestling Federation, where she began teaming with Princess Victoria, and in March, the duo lost a series of matches against the team of The Fabulous Moolah and Wendi Richter. McIntyre defeated Richter in two separate matches in Bill Watts's Mid-South Wrestling Association. In November and December 1982, McIntyre worked for Stampede Wrestling, where she teamed with Judy Martin against Richter and Joyce Grable; the feud between the two teams resumed in April 1983 in Verne Gagne's American Wrestling Association.

In May 1983, McIntyre returned to Stampede Wrestling, where she continued her rivalry with Richter and Grable. This time, she teamed once again with Princess Victoria. Victoria and McIntyre won the NWA Women's World Tag Team Championship on May 13 in Calgary.

=== World Wrestling Federation (1982; 1984–1988) ===
In 1983, the World Wrestling Federation withdrew from the National Wrestling Alliance, and when McIntyre and Victoria rejoined the promotion in 1984, they were immediately recognized as holding the WWF Women's Tag Team Championship. The duo defended the championship against the team of Wendi Richter and Peggy Lee. Desiree Petersen later replaced Victoria in the team when Victoria had to retire due to a neck injury and the new duo lost the title in August 1985 to Judy Martin and Leilani Kai (known as The Glamour Girls) in Egypt.

McIntyre then began wrestling as a singles wrestler, immediately feuding with The Fabulous Moolah, unsuccessfully challenging her at Wrestlemania 2 (the referee counted the pin on McIntyre despite her left leg being draped over the bottom rope which should have stopped the count). It was necessary as her wrestling suit's right strap had broken during her failed top rope splash onto Moolah so they had to do this.Some speculated she was promised she'd win the title that night to get her to wrestle Moolah who she hated and cost her the chance to wrestle on an all women's wrestling tour of Syria. She won the WWF Women's Championship on July 3, 1986 when she defeated Moolah at the Brisbane Festival Hall on the WWF's 1986 Australian tour, but Moolah regained the title six days later at the Sydney Entertainment Centre (the only two times the WWF Women's Championship changed hands in the Southern Hemisphere). Although, recognized as an official title reign, this title change was never acknowledged by the WWF on any medium when it happened, though some websites like Facebook have a picture of McIntyre wearing the WWF's women title. Years later, Moolah called McIntyre the best female wrestler in Canada. In 1987, McIntyre consistently lost matches to Moolah and Sherri Martel. She also competed at the Survivor Series, teaming with Moolah, Rockin' Robin, and the Jumping Bomb Angels against Martel, Leilani Kai, Judy Martin, Donna Christanello, and Dawn Marie, herself eliminating both Christanello and Martel by pinfall before being eliminated by Kai. By 1990, the WWF women's division was again on hiatus.

=== Return to Canada (1993–1998) ===
After leaving the WWF, McIntyre continued to wrestle sporadically on the independent circuit. At that time, there were not many opportunities for females in the business. She competed in the Women's Pro Wrestling organization in the early 1990s. In November 1993, she won the Canadian Wrestling Alliance's Women's Championship from Iron Maiden, but lost it to Iron Maiden again in January 1994. They continued to feud into 1996, when the two women joined Extreme Canadian Championship Wrestling, where the two traded the Women's Championship, which McIntyre held for two months. In September, they competed in a strap match—a match where the wrestlers must compete while connected via a leather strap—in which McIntyre was victorious.

In November 1997, as a part of the International Championship Wrestling, she won the WWWA Women's Championship from Bertha Faye. She also held the ICW Women's Championship, which she lost in July 1998.

== Personal life ==
It is a common misconception that McIntyre is the daughter of professional wrestler Moose Morowski.

McIntyre retired from wrestling in 1998 after discovering she was pregnant, and she later gave birth to twins. In her spare time, she makes and sells crafts.

== Championships and accomplishments ==
- Canadian Wrestling Alliance
  - CWA Women's Championship (1 time)
- Extreme Canadian Championship Wrestling
  - ECCW Women's Championship (1 time)
- International Championship Wrestling
  - ICW Women's Championship (1 time)
  - WWWA Women's Championship (1 time)
- National Wrestling Alliance
  - NWA Texas Women's Championship (1 time)
  - NWA United States Women's Championship (1 time)
  - NWA World Women's Tag Team Championship (1 time) – with Penny Mitchell
- World Wrestling Federation
  - WWF Women's Championship (1 time)
  - WWF Women's Tag Team Championship (2 times, inaugural) – with Princess Victoria (1) and Desiree Petersen (1)
