= Judy Martin (wrestler) =

American professional wrestler (born 1955)

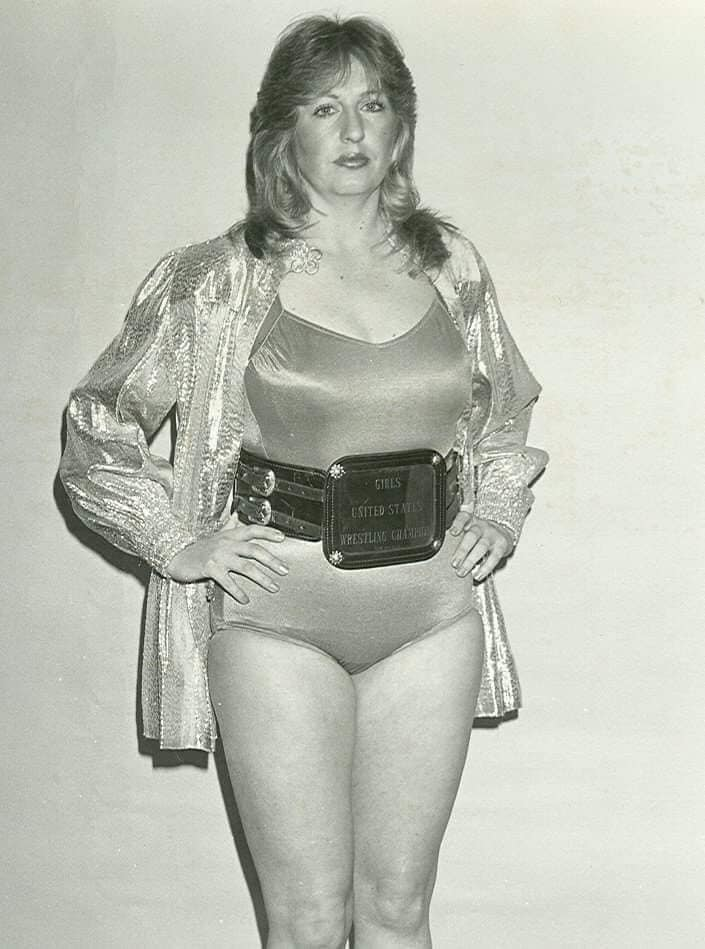
- Martin, c. 1981

Personal information
- Born: Judith Hardee; October 8, 1955 (age 70) Houston, Texas, U.S.

Professional wrestling career
- Ring name: Judy Martin
- Billed height: 5 ft 6 in (168 cm)
- Billed weight: 176 lb (80 kg)
- Billed from: Cleveland, Ohio Myrtle Beach, S.C.
- Trained by: The Fabulous Moolah; Joyce Grable; Leilani Kai
- Debut: 1978
- Retired: 1999

Judith Hardee (born October 8, 1955) is an American retired professional wrestler, better known by the ring name Judy Martin. She is best known for her appearances in the World Wrestling Federation (WWF), where she held the WWF Women's Tag Team Championship with Leilani Kai as the Glamour Girls.

== Professional wrestling career ==
=== Early career (1978–1981) ===
Martin first learned about women's wrestling after approaching wrestlers Blackjack Mulligan and Dick Murdoch after a match in South Carolina. In 1978, she began training with The Fabulous Moolah, Joyce Grable, and Leilani Kai. She then began her career with a tour of Japan then began wrestling in spotlight matches for various promotions in America including Mid South Wrestling.

=== World Wrestling Federation (1981–1989) ===
In 1981, Martin competed in the World Wrestling Federation (WWF)'s women's tag team division, original partnering with Candy Malloy. She also often partnered with Leilani Kai and occasionally Donna Christanello. Martin also challenged champion Wendi Richter for the WWF Women's title as part of The Fabulous Moolah's stable of wrestlers that included Spider Lady, Mad Maxine, and Leilani Kai.

Kai and Martin were awarded the WWF Women's Tag Team Championship from champions Velvet McIntyre and Desiree Petersen in 1985. After touring on the independent circuit and Japan for a few years, Martin and Kai returned to the WWF, repackaged as the platinum haired The Glamour Girls. The duo appeared at the first Survivor Series in 1987 as part of then champion Sherri Martel's team to face the Fabulous Moolah's team. Martel's team consisting of Martel, The Glamour Girls (Leilani Kai and Judy Martin), Dawn Marie, and Donna Christanello lost to The Fabulous Moolah's team consisting of Moolah, Velvet McIntyre, Rockin' Robin, and the Japanese imports, the Jumping Bomb Angels (Noriyo Tateno and Itsuki Yamazaki). The Glamour Girls (managed by Jimmy Hart) feuded for much of 1988 with The Jumping Bomb Angels for the WWF Women's Tag Team Championship. The two teams staged an epic two out of three falls match at the first Royal Rumble event in 1988, with the Bomb Angels capturing the gold. Kai and Martin recaptured the title months later in Japan before the belts were once again abandoned.

In 1989, Martin wrestled Rockin' Robin for the WWF Women's Championship at the Royal Rumble. She continued to challenge Robin for approximately six months, until the WWF phased out the women's division.

=== American Wrestling Association (1989) ===
After leaving the WWF in 1989, Martin joined the American Wrestling Association (AWA) to compete for the AWA World Women's Championship. She first feuded with reigning champion Wendi Richter, but was unsuccessful. After Richter left the company, she wrestled Candi Devine in a match to determine the new champion on December 6, 1989, which Devine won.

=== Ladies Professional Wrestling Association (1991–1992) ===
The Glamour Girls then surfaced in the newly formed Ladies Professional Wrestling Association (LPWA), managed by Adnan El Kassey. They wrestled as both a tag team and in singles competition as top contenders to LPWA Champion Susan Sexton's title. After months of feuding with Tag Team Champions Misty Blue Simmes and Heidi Lee Morgan (Team America), The Girls finally captured the LPWA Tag Team Title. They feuded with teams like the Bad, Black, & Beautiful; The New Team America (Misty Blue Simmes and Alison Royal), and Bambi and Malia Hosaka (who the duo faced at the only LPWA pay-per-view, LPWA Super Ladies Showdown) before the LPWA folded in 1992.

=== World Championship Wrestling (1991) ===
While working in the LPWA, Martin also made appearances in World Championship Wrestling (WCW). On the October 19, 1991 edition of WCW Saturday Night, Martin wrestled Bambi, but the match was interrupted when Madusa interfered. Then on the October 26 edition of WCW WorldWide, Martin lost a match to Madusa. WCW was phasing out the women wrestlers and focusing more attention on the valets, so Martin disappeared shortly thereafter.

=== Late career (1992–1999) ===
Martin then became embroiled in a feud with fellow veteran, Susan Green, who was then the Professional Girl Wrestling Association (PGWA) champion. In a mixed tag team match where the title was on the line, Martin's male partner, Thunderfoot, pinned Green's ally, George South, to win the tag match, and the women's belt automatically went to Judy. One month later, Green met Martin in a proper singles match with the title on the line, and Susan pinned Judy to regain the belt.

== Professional wrestling style and persona ==
Martin's signature moves were a powerbomb known as the "Drip Dry", a fireman's carry powerslam known as the "Judy Drop", and a double chickenwing.

== Personal life ==
After her retirement, Martin worked in law enforcement and then transcribed medical records.

In July 2016, Martin was named part of a class action lawsuit filed against WWE which alleged that wrestlers incurred traumatic brain injuries during their tenure and that the company concealed the risks of injury. The suit was litigated by attorney Konstantine Kyros, who has been involved in a number of other lawsuits against WWE. The lawsuit was dismissed by US District Judge Vanessa Lynne Bryant in September 2018.

== Championships and accomplishments ==
- All Japan Women's Pro-Wrestling
  - All Pacific Championship (1 time)
- Cauliflower Alley Club
  - Women's Wrestling Award (2012)
  - Tag Team Award (2026) – with Leilani Kai
- Ladies Professional Wrestling Association
  - LPWA Tag Team Championship (1 time) – with Leilani Kai
- Professional Girl Wrestling Association
  - PGWA Championship (1 time)
- National Wrestling Alliance
  - NWA United States Women's Championship (3 times)
  - NWA World Women's Tag Team Championship (2 times) - with Leilani Kai
- Professional Wrestling Hall of Fame and Museum
  - Class of 2021
- St. Louis Wrestling Hall of Fame
  - Class of 2024
- World Wrestling Federation
  - WWF Women's Tag Team Championship (2 times, final) – with Leilani Kai
