= Desiree Petersen =

Canadian professional wrestler

Personal information
- Born: Calgary, Alberta, Canada

Professional wrestling career
- Ring name(s): Desiree Petersen; Malisa Dahl
- Billed height: 5 ft 9 in (1.75 m)
- Billed weight: 165 lb (75 kg)
- Billed from: Copenhagen, Denmark
- Trained by: Velvet McIntyre; Leilani Kai; Judy Martin; Princess Victoria; Penny Mitchell
- Debut: 1983
- Retired: 2007

Desiree Petersen is a Canadian retired professional wrestler. She was born in Calgary, Alberta, however, was often billed from Copenhagen, Denmark, the place where her mother is from. Petersen used to wrestle for World Wrestling Federation in the 80's, where she once held the WWF Women's Tag Team Championship alongside Velvet McIntyre.

== Professional wrestling career ==
=== Training (1983) ===
In 1982, Desiree Petersen met Stu Hart. Hart would not train her, but referred her for training with The Fabulous Moolah. After training at Moolah's school, Petersen made her professional debut in January 1983 against Velvet McIntyre in British Columbia.

=== World Wrestling Federation (1984–1985; 1988) ===
In December 1984, Petersen replaced Princess Victoria as Velvet McIntyre's tag-team partner and was awarded the WWF Women's Tag Team Championship. From 1984-1985, Petersen competed in solo and tag-team matches against Moolah, Mad Maxine, Leilani Kai, Judy Martin, Donna Christanello, Penny Mitchell, Peggy Patterson, and Peggy Lee. During the first half of 1985, Petersen was engaged in a major solo feud against Martin, which was also spotlighted during her interview with Vince McMahon on Tuesday Night Titans in June 1985.

Petersen and McIntyre defended the titles until splitting up. A tag team title match between The Glamour Girls (Judy Martin and Leilani Kai) and champions McIntyre and Petersen was reported to have happened in Egypt in 1985, but in actuality, the match never took place. Kai and Martin were awarded the titles after McIntyre and Petersen split up when Petersen left the WWF in 1985.

Petersen returned to the WWF in 1988 and feuded with WWF Women's Champion Sherri Martel.

=== Ladies Professional Wrestling Association (1992) ===
After leaving the WWF, Petersen competed in the Ladies Professional Wrestling Association. At the LPWA Super Ladies Showdown pay-per-view event, she was defeated by Shinobu Kandori.

== Championships and accomplishments ==
- World Wrestling Federation
  - WWF Women's Tag Team Champion (1 time) – with Velvet McIntyre
- Women's Wrestling Hall of Fame
  - Class of 2025
