= Don Owen (wrestling) =

American professional wrestling promoter (1912–2002)

- Owen making ring introductions at the Portland Sports Arena in 1983

Personal information
- Born: March 16, 1912 Pendleton, Oregon, U.S.
- Died: August 1, 2002 (aged 90) Eugene, Oregon, U.S.

Professional wrestling career
- Ring name: Don Owen
- Debut: 1930s
- Retired: 1992

Don Owen (March 16, 1912 – August 1, 2002) was an American professional wrestling promoter. For several decades, he owned and operated the highly successful Pacific Northwest Wrestling (PNW) under his parent company, Don Owen Sports, which was based out of Portland, Oregon.

== Career ==
Born in Eugene, Oregon to boxing/wrestling promoter Herb Owen, Don and his brother Elton began working in the family business in the mid-1920s, selling popcorn and drinks to the audience. Early on, Don and Elton even stepped into the ring on occasion to box or wrestle. In time, Don moved more and more into the promoting side, eventually taking over completely after his father died in 1951. His career as a promoter spanned over 60 years throughout the heyday of territorial pro wrestling. Owen was a founding member of the National Wrestling Alliance.

Under management of Don Owen Sports, Pacific Northwest Wrestling became one of the leaders of the National Wrestling Alliance, the chief reason being Don Owen's reputation as the best payoff promoter in the wrestling business. Owen was known for dealing fairly with all his wrestlers, paying them exactly what he promised and never trying to stiff them, a mentality not shared with the vast majority of his fellow promoters. Because of this, every major star in the 1960s and 1970s wished to wrestle in the Northwest. Among those who wrestled and/or got their start under Don Owen's management are Stan Stasiak, Dizzy Hogan, Curt Hennig, Mad Dog Vachon, Nick Bockwinkel, Jesse Ventura, Roddy Piper, Billy Jack Haynes, Omar Atlas, Shag Thomas, Dutch Savage, Lonnie "Moondog" Mayne, Jimmy Snuka, and George Wagner (in the years before he attained international fame as Gorgeous George).

=== Portland Wrestling ===
In 1952, Don Owen negotiated a deal with pioneering Portland TV station KPTV to become the very first wrestling show seen on TV in the city. Portland Wrestling (later known as Big Time Wrestling) continued as a weekly program until the show ended production in December 1991, possibly setting a record as the longest-lasting wrestling show in the history of American television.

In 1968 Owen left the Portland Armory venue and bought and renovated a bowling alley which eventually became the Portland Sports Arena and the new home of PNW. The company held strong throughout the 1970s despite competition from 'outlaw promotions', and in 1976, Dutch Savage bought into Don Owen Sports and began promoting PNW cards in the state of Washington.

By the 1980s, professional wrestling had seen a revival on behalf of Vince McMahon's World Wrestling Federation (WWF). However, McMahon had accomplished this by successfully driving the old wrestling "territories" like PNW out of existence. That same decade, the formation of World Championship Wrestling (WCW), WWF's future chief competitor, would also contribute to the disintegration of territorial wrestling.

Finally, in July 1992, facing increasing health problems from age, overwhelming competition from WWF and WCW, and unrelenting problems from an overzealous Oregon State Athletic Commission, as well as the bankruptcy of his main television sponsor, Don Owen was forced to shut down PNW's operations. He sold the entire company, minus the Sports Arena, to promoter Sandy Barr. The Portland Sports Arena was sold to a local church. Owen then lived out a quiet retirement until his death in 2002. Owen was the youngest of the original founding members of the NWA and the last surviving original member after the death of Sam Muchnick in 1998.

== Personal life ==
Owen was married with three sons, Mike, Marc and Barry.

== Awards and accomplishments ==
- Professional Wrestling Hall of Fame and Museum
  - Class of 2021
- Wrestling Observer Newsletter
  - Wrestling Observer Newsletter Hall of Fame (Class of 2021)

== See also ==
- List of professional wrestling promoters
