= Wendi Richter =

American professional wrestler (born 1961)

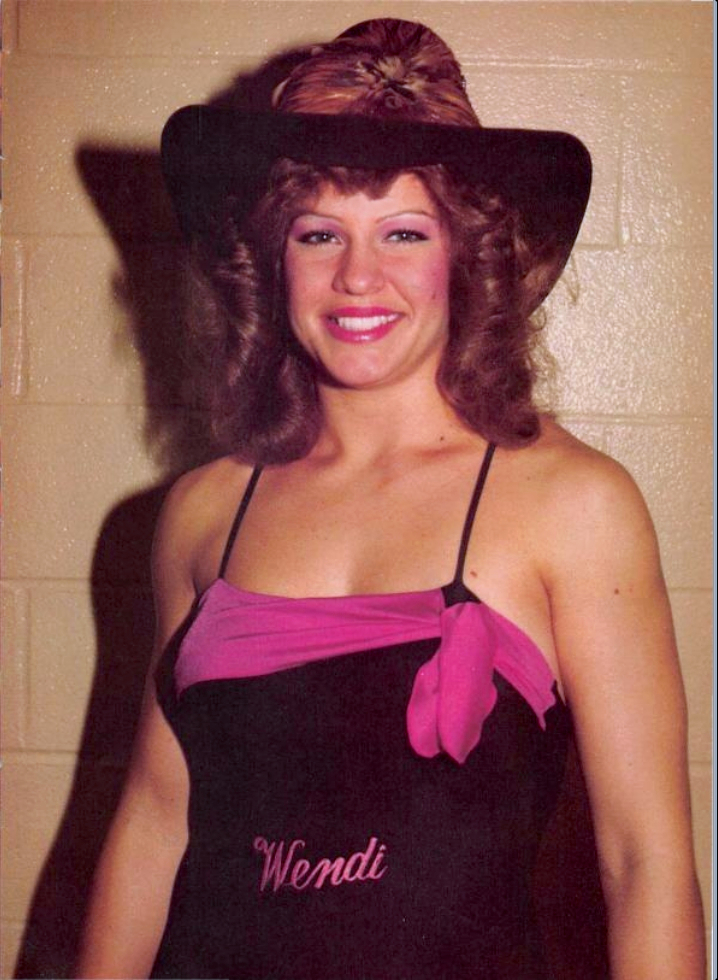
- Richter in 1984

Personal information
- Born: Dallas, Texas, U.S.

Professional wrestling career
- Ring name(s): Wendi Richter; Wendy Richter
- Billed height: 5 ft 8 in (1.73 m)
- Billed weight: 140 lb (64 kg)–150 lb (68 kg)
- Billed from: Dallas, Texas
- Trained by: The Fabulous Moolah; Judy Martin
- Debut: 1979
- Retired: 2005

Victoria "Wendi" Richter is an American occupational therapist and former professional wrestler. She began her professional wrestling career in companies such as the National Wrestling Alliance, where she teamed with Joyce Grable, with whom she held the NWA Women's World Tag Team Championship twice. In the 1980s, she joined the World Wrestling Federation (WWF). She held the WWF Women's Championship twice and feuded with The Fabulous Moolah over the title. She was also involved in a storyline with singer Cyndi Lauper called the "Rock 'n' Wrestling Connection". Richter, however, left the WWF after losing the championship in controversial fashion. She then worked in the World Wrestling Council and American Wrestling Association, where she held both companies' women's titles.

== Professional wrestling career ==
=== Early career (1979–1983) ===
Wendi Richter was trained at The Fabulous Moolah's Lillian Ellison School of Professional Wrestling by Leilani Kai, Judy Martin and Joyce Grable and made her professional debut in 1979. In early 1982, Richter tag teamed with Moolah against Velvet McIntyre and Princess Victoria for three matches for the World Wide Wrestling Federation. Richter was later paired with Joyce Grable, with whom she also trained for six weeks, to form a tag team called The Texas Cowgirls. In late 1982, they wrestled in a series of matches in Canada's Stampede Wrestling against Velvet McIntyre and Judy Martin. She continued her feud with McIntyre in Bill Watts' Mid-South Wrestling Association, where she was defeated twice. While in Mid-South Wrestling Association she was a friend of Jim Cornette who made her an honorary member of the Midnight Express. Richter and Grable continued their rivalry with McIntyre and Martin into April 1983 in Verne Gagne's American Wrestling Association. In May, the team reformed in Stampede Wrestling in matches against McIntyre and Penny Mitchell. The team also won the NWA Women's World Tag Team Championship twice.

=== World Wrestling Federation (1983–1985) ===
==== Rock 'n' Wrestling (1983–1985) ====
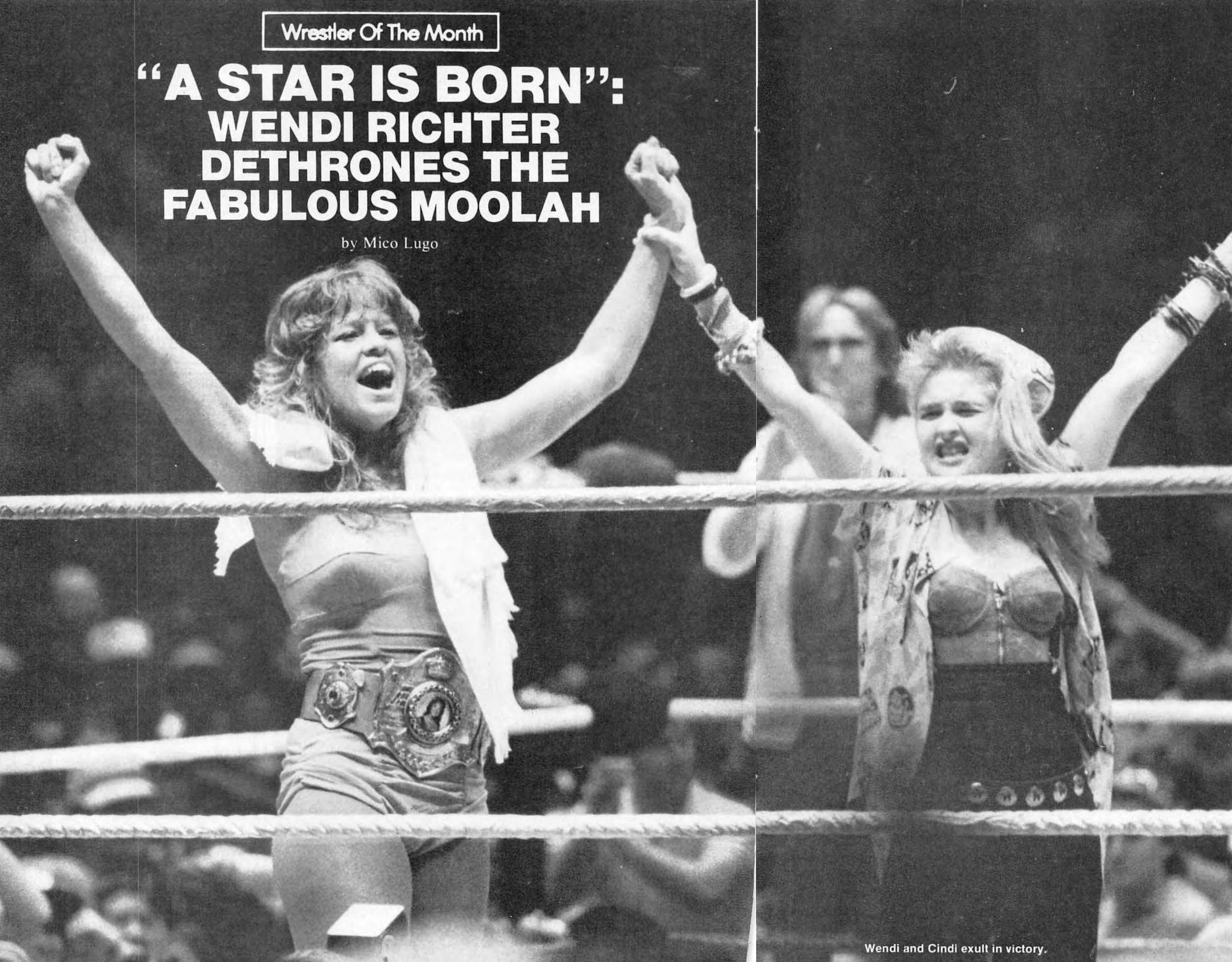
Richter (left) celebrates with Cyndi Lauper after becoming WWF Women's Champion. This victory prompted Wrestling's Main Event Magazine to name her Wrestler of the Month.

Richter returned stateside signing with the World Wrestling Federation (WWF) in late 1983. In April 1984, Richter teamed with Peggy Lee for a series of matches with old rivals Velvet McIntyre and Princess Victoria. WWF owner Vince McMahon brought in Cyndi Lauper for a feud with Lou Albano (who had appeared as Lauper's dad in her Girls Just Want to Have Fun music video). Albano seconded WWF Women's Champion Fabulous Moolah, while Lauper was in the corner of Wendi Richter. Richter defeated Moolah at MTV's The Brawl to End It All for the Women's Championship on July 23, 1984, with Richter lifting her own shoulder off the canvas during a double-pinfall situation while Moolah's shoulders remained down. With the win, she ended what was billed as the longest championship reign in professional wrestling history (Moolah's 28-year reign as recognized by the WWF; in reality she had lost the title several times between 1956 and 1978, and Richter's win had in reality only ended a nearly seven-year reign by Moolah as champion). The broadcast of the women's match earned MTV its largest ratings in history up to that point. This match was also the beginning of the "Rock 'n' Wrestling Connection", an era that combined both music and professional wrestling. Richter faced Moolah's protégé, Leilani Kai, who defeated Richter for the title, in early 1985 at The War to Settle the Score. She regained the title at the first WrestleMania one month later. While wrestling for the WWF, Richter referred to herself as "150 pounds of twisted steel and sex appeal". Richter was also animated for a CBS Saturday morning cartoon, Hulk Hogan's Rock 'n' Wrestling. In addition, she appeared in Lauper's music video for "She Bop".

==== The Original Screwjob (1985) ====
In 1985, after losing and then regaining the title from rival Leilani Kai at the inaugural WrestleMania, Richter was scheduled to defend her title at MSG on November 25 of that same year against a mysterious masked opponent known only as The Spider. During the match, The Spider broke from the planned events and pinned Richter's shoulders to the mat. The referee—who was in on the plan—delivered a swift three-count, despite Richter kicking out after a count of one. Richter ignored the bell and continued to attack The Spider, unmasking the new champion to reveal that it was The Fabulous Moolah in disguise.

It was reported that the plan to rid Richter of the title was concocted by WWF Chairman Vince McMahon, who brought in Moolah after Richter allegedly refused to sign a new contract with the WWF. Richter, however, claims she was still under her original five-year contract, though she did regularly have disagreements with McMahon about her compensation. She also claims that when she arrived at the arena that day, she was surprised to find Moolah backstage, as she never showed up to events at which she was not scheduled to wrestle. After the match, an infuriated Richter left the arena in her wrestling gear, took a cab to the airport, and booked herself on a flight out of New York. Afterward, she never spoke to Moolah again.

=== Later career (1987–2005) ===
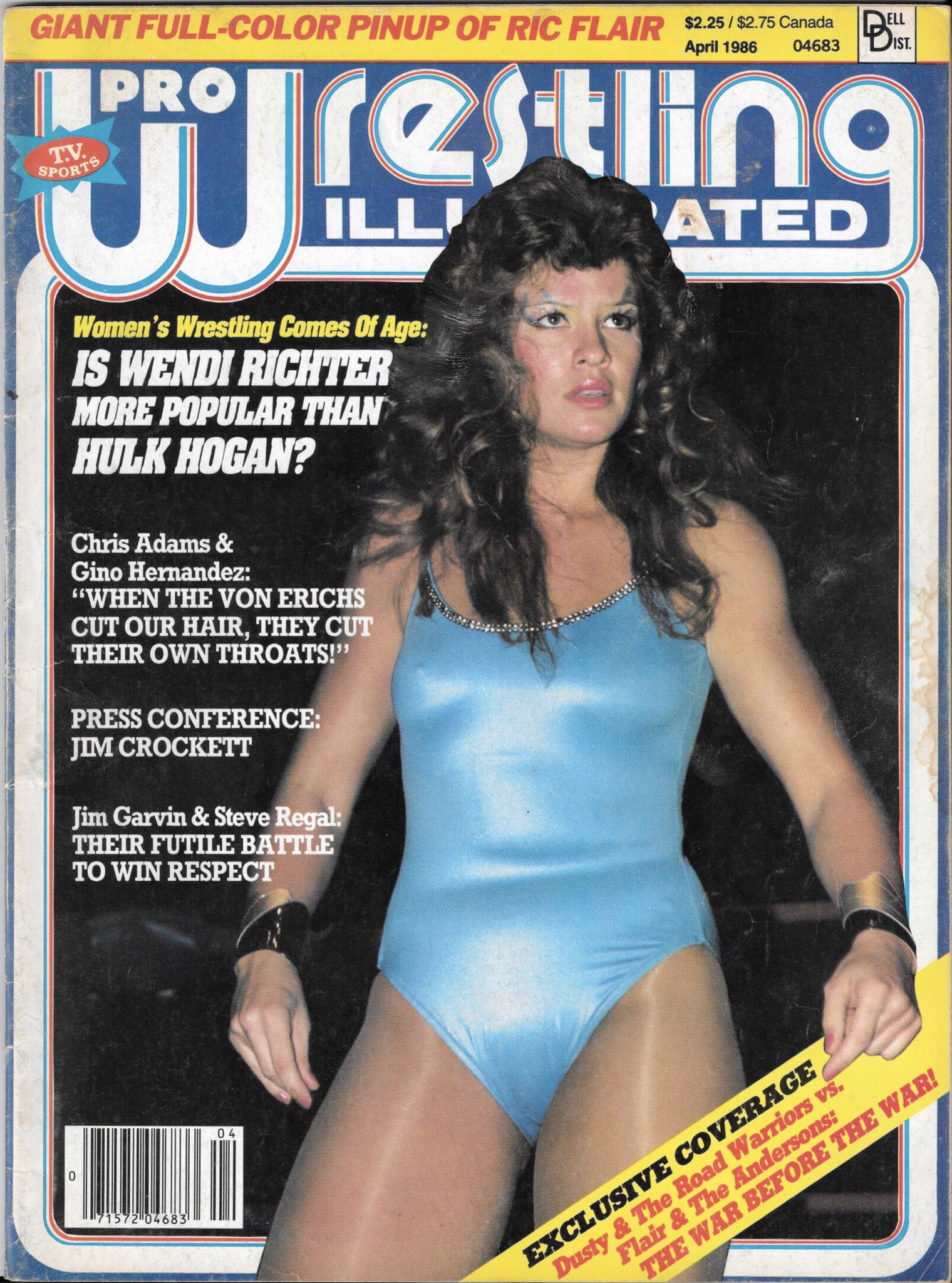
Richter on the April 1986 cover of Pro Wrestling Illustrated

Upon leaving the WWF, Richter wrestled in Puerto Rico, Japan, and throughout the US in independent promotions. In Puerto Rico's WWC, she traded the WWC Women's Championship with Monster Ripper, holding the belt twice: once in May 1987 and once in July 1987.

Richter surfaced in the AWA in 1987 to challenge champion Madusa Miceli for the AWA Women's Championship, winning the title in December 1988. On December 13, 1988, she participated in a mixed tag team match at SuperClash III with partners The Top Guns (Ricky Rice and Derrick Dukes) against Badd Company (Paul Diamond and Pat Tanaka) and Madusa Miceli. Richter's team won the match when she pinned Miceli.

She wrestled only a few times in the 1990s.

On January 29, 2005, Richter appeared at WrestleReunion in an eight-woman tag team match (teaming with Bambi, Malia Hosaka, and Jenny Taylor) wrestling against Sherri Martel, Peggy Lee Leather, Krissy Vaine, and Amber O'Neal. In August of that same year, Richter appeared at the second WrestleReunion event, WrestleReunion 2, in a six-person tag team match.

=== Life after wrestling and WWE Hall of Fame (2005–present) ===
In the years after her retirement, Richter was uninvolved with wrestling. In a 2005 shoot interview, she expressed disgust toward the portrayal of women in the WWE product, and was still hurt over her WWF exit. In 2010, Richter was offered induction in the WWE Hall of Fame Class of 2010, which she accepted. She was inducted by Roddy Piper. In contrast of her shoot interviews, her speech spoke fondly of her wrestling career and how the WWE Divas thanked her for her influence. Richter's speech ended joyfully, exclaiming "Girls Just Wanna Have Fun!"

On the June 16, 2012, episode of Raw, Richter appeared in an in-ring segment along with Cyndi Lauper, Roddy Piper and then-Diva's Champion Layla as part of the "1000th episode" buildup. Piper expressed his gratitude to Richter and Lauper for their "Rock 'N Wrestling" angle and presented Lauper with a gold record, with which she eventually hit Heath Slater, who at the time had a gimmick of insulting veteran Superstars before getting his comeuppance.

On December 31, 2023, during the Worlds End 2023 post-show press conference, the AEW Women's Champion “Timeless” Toni Storm was asked if there are any free agents that she would like to see Tony Khan sign to AEW.

“Tony, I don’t care how much you’re going to yell at me for this after, but yes, there is quite the free agent out there, isn’t there?” she said. “There is money written all over it. Wendi Richter … I’m going to fuck you up!”

== Personal life ==
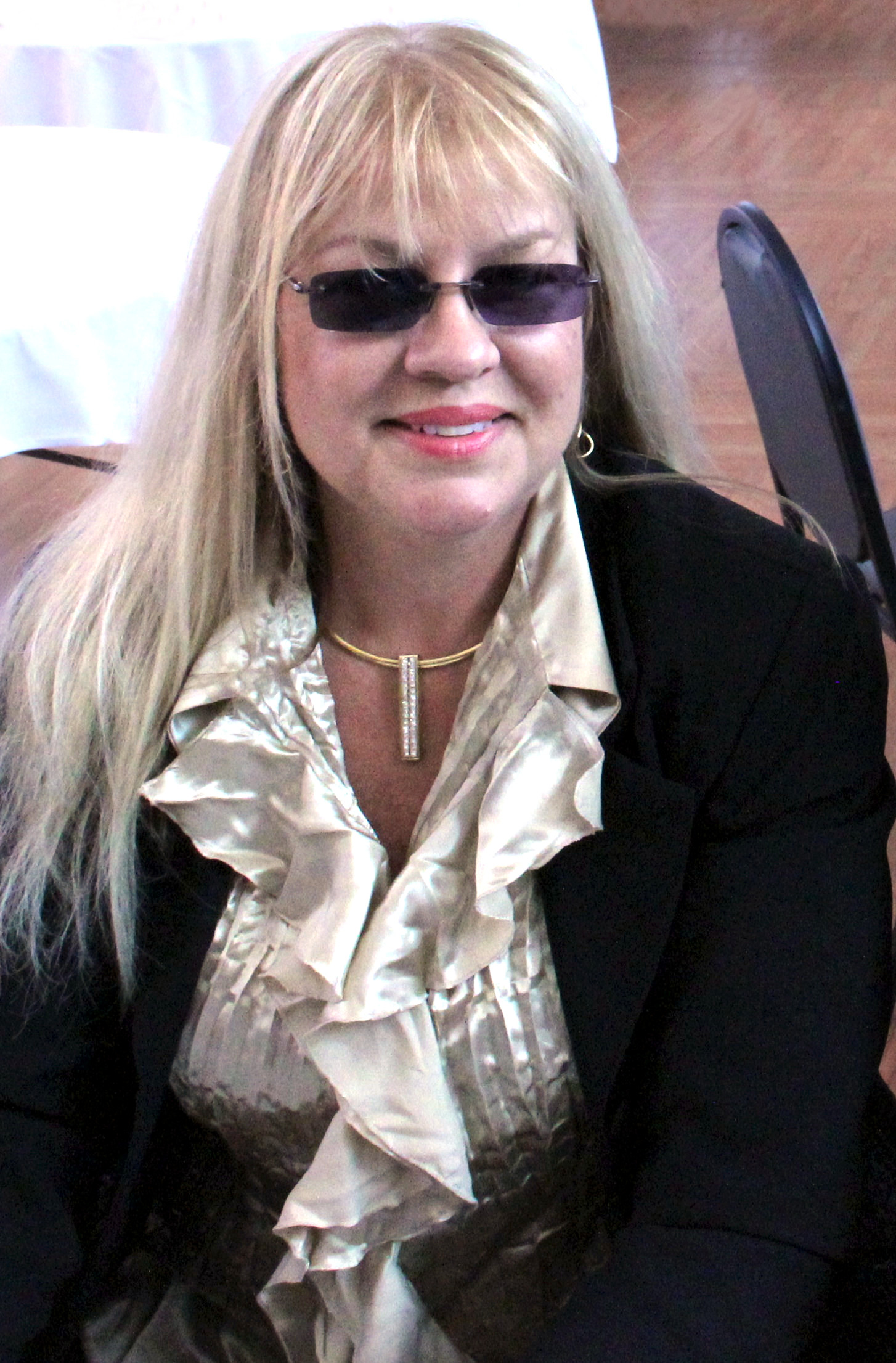
Richter in 2012

Born in Dallas, Richter grew up in her birth city and before she entered the sport of professional wrestling, she worked on her family's ranch and took part in rodeo competitions. She attended Bossier High School, where she participated in volleyball, track, and cross-country. She later majored in computer programming at Dallas's Draughon's Business College. In the 1980s, she moved to Crystal River, Florida.

After leaving the wrestling business, Richter worked as a real estate agent. She also returned to school for 13 years, earning a degree in physical therapy and a master's degree in occupational therapy. Aside from therapy, Richter competes in dog shows, including the Westminster Kennel Club Dog Show. She was once married to Hugo Savinovich, a former Spanish announcer for the WWF. In 2019, she was featured in the documentary Circle of Champions: The History of Women's Pro Wrestling directed by Christopher Annino.

She currently works as an occupational therapist for Rehab Partners Inc.

== Championships and accomplishments ==
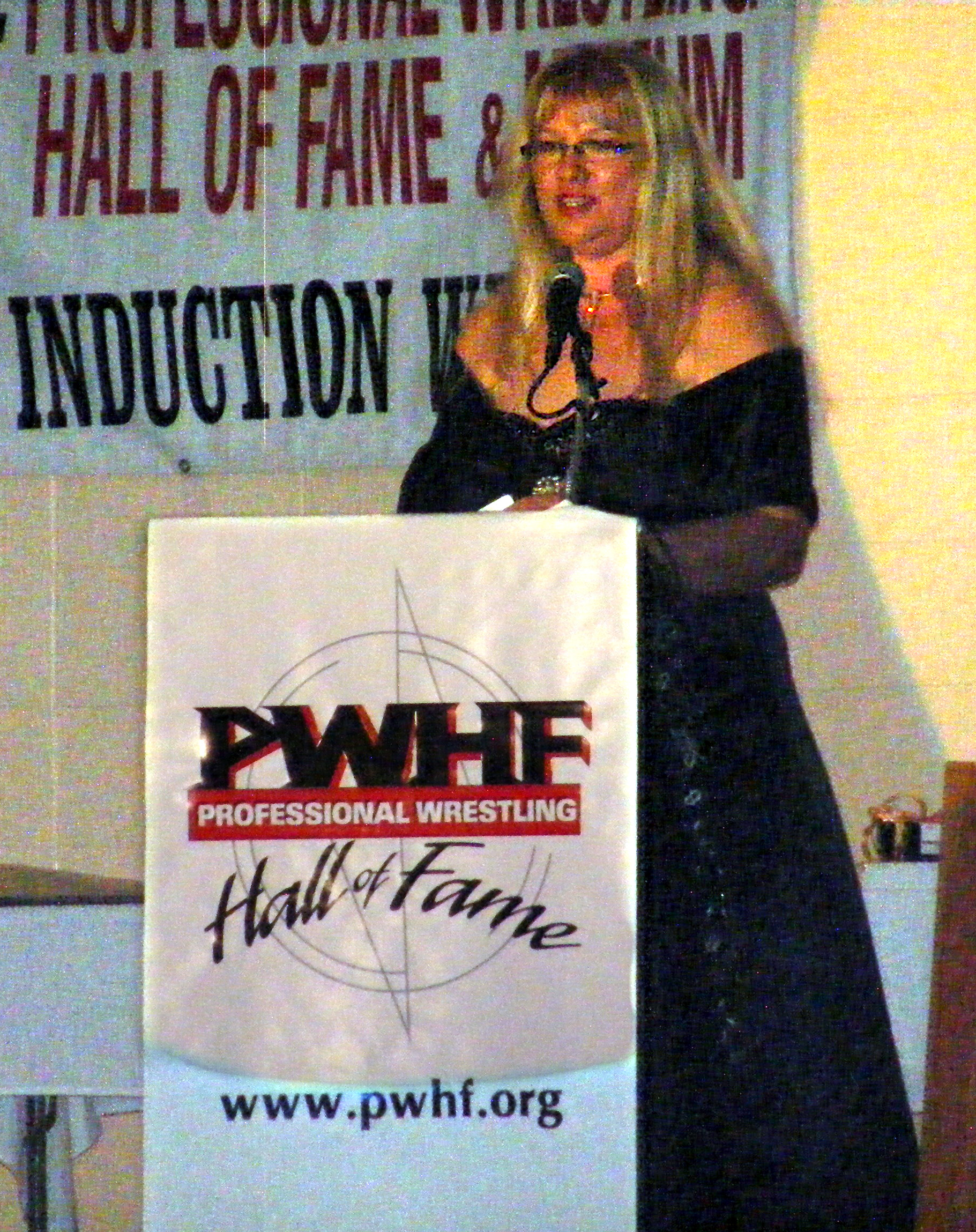
Richter was inducted into the Professional Wrestling Hall of Fame in 2012

- American Wrestling Association

- AWA Women's Championship (1 time)

- Cauliflower Alley Club

- Art Abrams Lifetime Achievement Award (2012)
- Other honoree (1993)

- International Professional Wrestling Hall of Fame
  - Class of 2026
- National Wrestling Alliance

- NWA United States Women's Championship (1 time)
- NWA World Women's Tag Team Championship (3 times) – with Joyce Grable

- National Wrestling Federation

- NWF Women's Championship (6 time)

- Professional Wrestling Hall of Fame

- Class of 2012

- St. Louis Wrestling Hall of Fame

- Class of 2024

- Stampede Wrestling

- Stampede Wrestling North American Women's Championship (1 time)

- Women's Wrestling Hall of Fame

- Class of 2024 – with Joyce Grable
- Class of 2025 – individually

- World Wrestling Council

- WWC Women's Championship (4 times)

- World Wrestling Federation/Entertainment

- WWF Women's Championship (2 times)
- WWE Hall of Fame (Class of 2010)

- Wrestling Observer Newsletter
  - Worst Match of the Year (1984) vs. The Fabulous Moolah on July 23
