= Ladies Major League Wrestling =

Defunct American professional wrestling promotion

Ladies Major League Wrestling Wild Women of Wrestling
- Acronym: LMLW; WWOW
- Founded: October 27, 1989
- Style: Women's professional wrestling
- Headquarters: Florida
- Founder: Howard Brody
- Formerly: Wild Women of Wrestling

Ladies Major League Wrestling (LMLW) was a women's professional wrestling company that operated from 1989–1992. Their cards were promoted under the Wild Women of Wrestling (WWOW) name.

== History ==
Wild Women of Wrestling logo.

Howard Brody incorporated the Ladies Major League Wrestling, Inc. (LMLW) company on October 27, 1989. The promotion featured women wrestlers that had previously competed in the World Wrestling Federation, National Wrestling Alliance, American Wrestling Association, and Powerful Women of Wrestling promotions, along with several independent women wrestlers. Their matches were aired under the "Wild Women of Wrestling" banner on the Universal Wrestling Federation television series Fury Hour and sold on home video.

In 1989, Brody and business partner Craig Cohen hired Luna Vachon as the head booker of the company.

== Championships ==
=== LMLW World Championship ===
LMLW originally planned on having former WWF Women's Champion Wendi Richter face NWA United States Women's Champion Misty Blue Simmes to determine the first Ladies Major League Wrestling World Champion; however, Simmes and her troupe of wrestlers (including Linda Dallas and Kat LeRoux) turned down the offer to work for LMLW's initial taping. Instead, in April 1990, Bambi won the "Collision of Champions Battle Royal" to crown the first Ladies Major League Wrestling World Champion (also referred to as the Wild Women of Wrestling Champion).

After Bambi, Peggy Lee Leather, and Malia Hosaka missed their plane from a Ladies Professional Wrestling Association television taping in Las Vegas, Nevada to the LMLW taping in Key West, Florida on November 30, 1990, booker Luna Vachon re-booked the LMLW tapings for the following evening (December 1, 1990) and had Bambi drop the LMLW World Championship to her. Leather and Hosaka were also punished by Luna's booking decisions at the taping.

Key
No.	Overall reign number
Reign	Reign number for the specific team—reign numbers for the individuals are in parentheses, if different
Days	Number of days held

No.	Champion	Championship change			Reign statistics		Notes	Ref.
No.	Champion	Date	Event	Location	Reign	Days	Notes	Ref.
1	Bambi	April 1990	LMLW show	Fort Lauderdale, FL	1	N/A	Bambi defeated Candi Devine, Diane Von Hoffman, Heidi Lee Morgan, Judy Martin, Leilani Kai, Peggy Lee Leather, Penelope Paradise, Pink Cadillac, Rustee "The Foxx" Thomas, Sindy Paradise, and Wendi Richter in a battle royal to become the inaugural champion.	
2	Luna Vachon	December 1, 1990	LMLW show	Pompano Beach, FL	1	N/A		
3	Bambi	1991	LMLW show	N/A	2	N/A	Bambi regained the championship from Luna but dropped it on another occasion before regaining it for her third reign.	
—	Deactivated	1992	—	—	—	—	LMLW closed in 1992	

=== LMLW International Championship ===
Peggy Lee Leather held the Ladies Major League Wrestling International Championship, but as a result of missing her flight to an LMLW taping on November 30, 1990, she was forced to lose it to Rockin' Robin on December 1, 1990.

Key
No.	Overall reign number
Reign	Reign number for the specific team—reign numbers for the individuals are in parentheses, if different
Days	Number of days held

No.	Champion	Championship change			Reign statistics		Notes	Ref.
No.	Champion	Date	Event	Location	Reign	Days	Notes	Ref.
1	Peggy Lee Leather	April 1990	LMLW show	Fort Lauderdale, FL	1	N/A		
2	Rockin' Robin	December 1, 1990	LMLW show	Pompano Beach, FL	1	N/A		
—	Deactivated	1992	—	—	—	—	LMLW closed in 1992	

=== LMLW Florida/Junior Championship ===
Malia Hosaka held the Ladies Major League Wrestling Florida Championship (also billed as Ladies Major League Wrestling Junior Championship) and lost it to Penelope Paradise on the same night when Bambi and Peggy Lee Leather also dropped their titles.

Key
No.	Overall reign number
Reign	Reign number for the specific team—reign numbers for the individuals are in parentheses, if different
Days	Number of days held

No.	Champion	Championship change			Reign statistics		Notes	Ref.
No.	Champion	Date	Event	Location	Reign	Days	Notes	Ref.
1	Malia Hosaka	April 1990	LMLW show	Fort Lauderdale, FL	1	N/A		
2	Penelope Paradise	December 1, 1990	LMLW show	Pompano Beach, FL	1	N/A		
—	Deactivated	1992	—	—	—	—	LMLW closed in 1992	

=== LMLW Tag Team Championship ===
The Glamour Girls (Leilani Kai and Judy Martin) held the Ladies Major League Wrestling Tag Team Championship.

Key
No.	Overall reign number
Reign	Reign number for the specific champion
Days	Number of days held

No.	Champion	Championship change			Reign statistics		Notes	Ref.
No.	Champion	Date	Event	Location	Reign	Days	Notes	Ref.
1	The Glamour Girls (Judy Martin and Leilani Kai)	1990	LMLW show	N/A	1	N/A		
—	Deactivated	1992	—	—	—	—	LMLW closed in 1992	

=== WWOW Television Championship ===
Luna Vachon held the Wild Women of Wrestling Television Championship.

Key
No.	Overall reign number
Reign	Reign number for the specific team—reign numbers for the individuals are in parentheses, if different
Days	Number of days held

No.	Champion	Championship change			Reign statistics		Notes	Ref.
No.	Champion	Date	Event	Location	Reign	Days	Notes	Ref.
1	Luna Vachon	N/A	WWOW show	N/A	1	N/A		
—	Deactivated	1992	—	—	—	—	LMLW closed in 1992	

=== Other championships ===
The organization also recognized Wendi Richter as the World Champion/Universally Recognized Champion (separate from the LMLW World Championship), Candi Devine as the North American Champion, Peggy Lee Leather as the Southern States Champion, Heidi Lee Morgan as the Northeastern Champion, Bambi as the Georgia Champion, Penelope Paradise as the Florida Champion (separate from the LMLW Florida Championship), Sindy Paradise as the Caribbean Champion, Diane Von Hoffman as the European Champion, Rustee "The Foxx" Thomas as the Virginia Commonwealth Champion, and Sheila Fox as the Australian Champion.

Cadillac Pink was recognized as the 1989 Rookie of the Year.

== Alumni ==
=== Wrestlers ===
- Angie Maurin
- Ariel Dee (Denise Klimowicz)
- Babyface Nellie
- Bambi (Selina Majors)
- Banshee (Penny Mitchell)
- B.J. Calhoun
- Brenda Lee
- Cadillac Pink (Tina Smith, also referred to as Pink Cadillac)
- Candi Devine (Candace Rummel)
- "Dirty" Debbie Drake (Debbie Killian, aka Debbie Malenko)
- Diane Von Hoffman
- Heidi Lee Morgan
- Joanne McCartney
- Judy Martin (Judy Hardee)
- Kat LeRoux
- Leilani Kai (Patricia Schroeder)
- Luna Vachon (Gertrude Vachon) (also backstage interviewer)
- Malia Hosaka
- Misty Blue Simmes (Diane Syms)
- Peggy Lee Leather
- Penelope Paradise (Kim Ollis-Sacks)
- Rockin' Robin (Robin Smith)
- Rustee "the Foxx" Thomas
- Sheila Fox
- Sindy Paradise
- Spectre (Terri Shane)
- Taylor Made (Terri Poch)
- Tina Moretti (Lisa Moretti)
- Vivan St. John
- Wendi Richter

=== Tag Teams ===
- The Glamour Girls (Leilani Kai and Judy Martin with Abdullah Farouk Jr.)
- The Mystics (Spectre and Banshee)
- The Power Team (Heidi Lee Morgan, Sindy Paradise, and Taylor Made)

=== Other on-air talent ===
==== Managers ====
- Abdullah Farouk Jr.
- Dick Slater

==== Announcers ====
- Bill Cardille
- Bruno Sammartino
