= WCW Women's Championship =

Former professional wrestling title

Details
- Promotion: World Championship Wrestling; GAEA Japan
- Date established: December 29, 1996
- Date retired: January 8, 1998

Other name
- WCW Women's Heavyweight Championship
Statistics
- First champion: Akira Hokuto
- Final champion: Devil Masami
- Most reigns: All titleholders (1 reign)
- Longest reign: Akira Hokuto (168 days)
- Shortest reign: Devil Masami (110 days)
- Oldest champion: Devil Masami (35 years, 257 days)
- Youngest champion: Akira Hokuto (29 years, 170 days)
- Heaviest champion: Devil Masami (150 lb (68 kg))
- Lightest champion: Akira Hokuto (130 lb (59 kg))

The World Championship Wrestling (WCW) Women's Heavyweight Championship (referred to mostly as the WCW Women's Championship) was a title for the women's professional wrestling division in World Championship Wrestling. It lasted from 1996 until 1998, when it was abandoned. It is not to be confused with prior women's titles recognized by the promotion.

The rights to the Women's Championship are owned by the WWE through the acquisition of selected assets of WCW since 2001.

== History ==
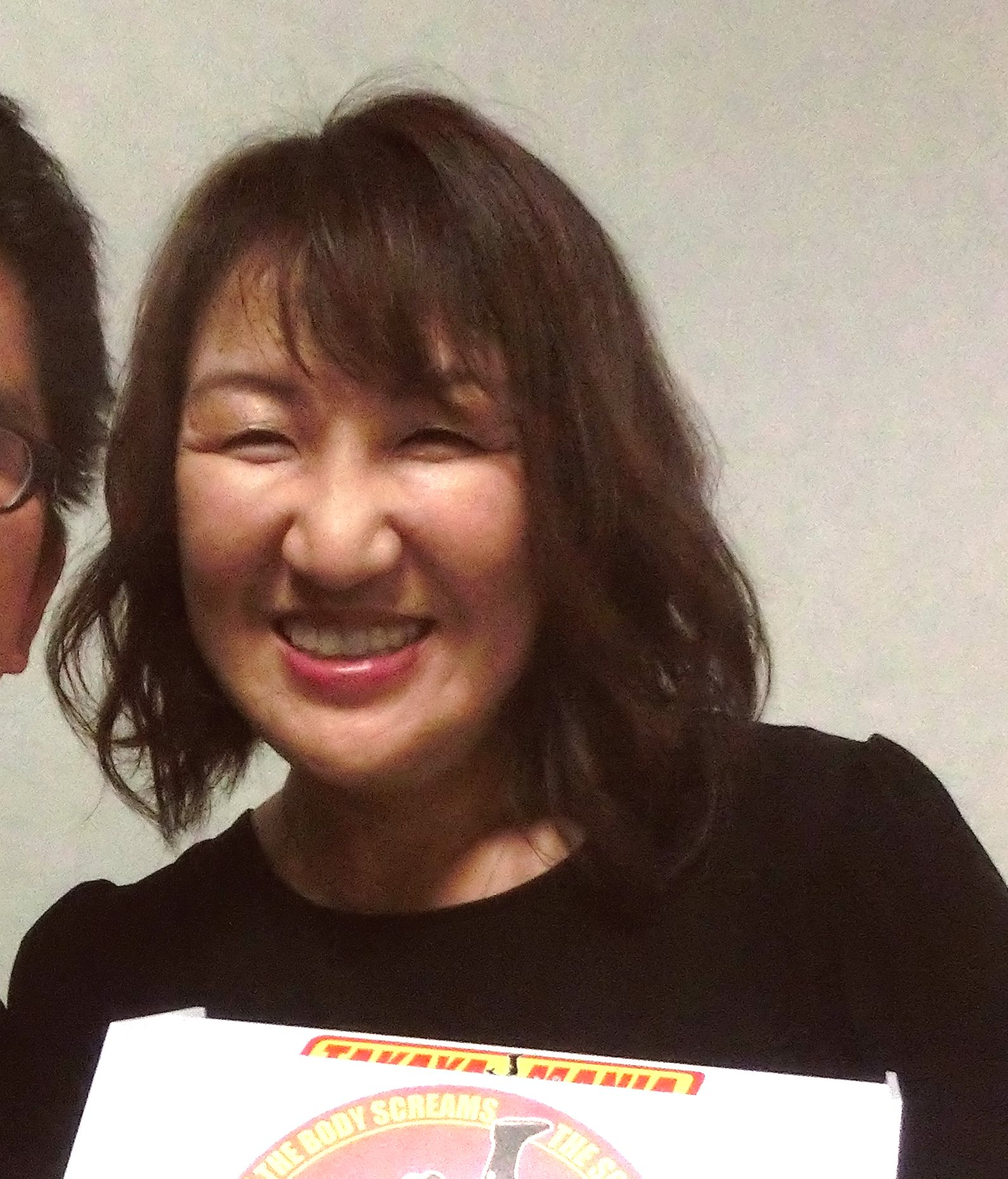
Inaugural champion Akira Hokuto

=== Prior women's titles recognized by World Championship Wrestling ===
In the mid-1980s, Jim Crockett Promotions (which eventually became World Championship Wrestling) was a member of the National Wrestling Alliance and recognized the NWA World Women's Championship, which was held by Debbie Combs. The Kansas City promotion that recognized Combs as the champion withdrew from NWA in 1987 and closed in 1988. During this time, the NWA vacated Combs' title and awarded Misty Blue Simmes the reactivated NWA United States Women's Championship (a replacement of the prior NWA World Women's Championship held by Combs). Simmes defended the title from 1987 to 1989, when the title was no longer recognized by Jim Crockett Promotions.

In 1990, the organization recognized Ladies Professional Wrestling Association Champion Susan Sexton as the World Women's Champion. Sexton defended the title against Bambi at Clash of the Champions XII.

WCW attempted to create a new women's division in 1991. At WrestleWar, a women's match was featured pitting Itsuki Yamazaki and Mami Kitimura against Miki Handa and Miss A. Later in the year, former United States Women's Champion Misty Blue Simmes returned to the organization and competed in matches against Linda Dallas and Kat LeRoux. During this time, the organization also featured televised matches involving Madusa, Bambi, Leilani Kai, and Judy Martin. By the end of the year, all of the female wrestlers departed from the organization except Madusa (who was retained as a valet).

=== New championship introduced ===
The women's division in WCW was slowly revived in 1996 following the return of Madusa, who spent the first half of the year feuding with Sherri Martel and Bull Nakano. This led to the creation of the WCW Women's Championship. The first official WCW Women's Champion was crowned in an 8-woman tournament that began on an episode of WCW Monday Nitro on November 4, 1996, and concluded at Starrcade on December 29, 1996. The tournament used only seven wrestlers; five of these wrestlers were Japanese talents from the GAEA Japan promotion (Akira Hokuto, Chigusa Nagayo, KAORU, Meiko Satomura, and Sonoko Kato). The other competitors were Madusa and Malia Hosaka. Akira Hokuto actually competed twice in the first round of the tournament, losing to Madusa wrestling under her masked Reina Jabuki gimmick and defeating Satomura competing as Hokuto.

The two primary competitors over the history of this title were Akira Hokuto and Madusa, as they met in the tournament finals and at subsequent PPV events. Other women that competed in the division included Malia Hosaka, Leilani Kai, Peggy Lee Leather, Debbie Combs, and Luna Vachon. The last defense of the title occurred at The Great American Bash on June 15, 1997, when Hokuto defeated Madusa in a title vs. career match. Madusa retired and Hokuto went back to Japan and the title was apparently vacated. On September 20, 1997, in Japan, Devil Masami won the vacated title; however, it was abandoned shortly thereafter. In the United States, WCW continued to feature women's wrestling occasionally on its minor TV shows during 1998. During the match between Malia Hosaka and Starla Saxton that aired on December 26, 1998, Mike Tenay acknowledged Akira Hokuto as the reigning WCW Women's Champion, even though the title had been won by Devil Masami in Japan and retired by the GAEA promotion.

In late 1999 and early 2000, WCW rebuilt the women's division by hiring several female wrestlers, as well as training the Nitro Girls to wrestle. An onscreen angle featured Madusa attempting to revive the WCW Women's Championship, but she was consistently halted in her efforts by the chauvinistic Oklahoma (who had been feuding with her over the WCW Cruiserweight Championship). During this time, the women's division included Madusa, Mona, Sherri Martel, Rhonda Sing, Patty Stonegrinder, Brandi Alexander, Little Jeanne, Dee Dee Venturi, Fantasy, Lexie Fyfe, Asya, Midnight, Daffney, Major Gunns, Miss Hancock, Torrie Wilson, Kimberly Page, Spice, Paisley, and Tygress. Although women's matches were featured regularly, the WCW Women's Championship was not reinstated. However, in March 2001, certain assets of WCW were sold by AOL Time Warner to the World Wrestling Federation (WWF, now WWE). As such these assets, including the WCW Women's Championship, were now WWF property, but was never revived during The Invasion storyline.

In addition to the WCW Women's Championship, the organization also recognized the WCW Women's Cruiserweight Championship in 1997.

=== Championship Tournament ===
Quarterfinals
Reina Jabuki
Madusa	Pin
Malia Hosaka
Zero	Pin
Sonoko Kato
Kaoru	Pin
Meiko Satomura
Akira Hokuto	Pin

Semifinals
Madusa
Zero	Pin
Kaoru
Akira Hokuto	Pin

Final
Madusa
Akira Hokuto	Pin

== Reigns ==
Over the championship's one-year history, there have only been two reigns between two champions. Akira Hokuto was the inaugural champion, and her reign was the longest at 168 days, while Devil Masami's reign, which was the last, lasted for 110 days. Masami is the oldest champion at 35 years old, while Hokuto is the youngest at 29 years old.

Key
No.	Overall reign number
Reign	Reign number for the specific champion
Days	Number of days held

No.	Champion	Championship change			Reign statistics		Notes	Ref.
No.	Champion	Date	Event	Location	Reign	Days	Notes	Ref.
1	Akira Hokuto	December 29, 1996	Starrcade	Nashville, TN	1	168	Hokuto defeated Madusa in the finals of an eight-woman single-elimination tournament to become the inaugural champion.	
—	Vacated	June 15, 1997	—	—	—	—	The championship was vacated by WCW after Akira Hokuto left the country.	
2	Devil Masami	September 20, 1997	GAEA Double Destiny	Kawasaki, Japan	1	110	Masami defeated Zero to win the vacant WCW Women's championship and the AAAW Single Championship.	
—	Deactivated	January 8, 1998	—	—	—	—	The championship was deactivated by GAEA on January 8, 1998; on April 3, WCW and GAEA end their working relationship.	

== See also ==
- Women's championships in WWE
- WCW Women's Cruiserweight Championship
