= Malia Hosaka =

American professional wrestler (born 1969)

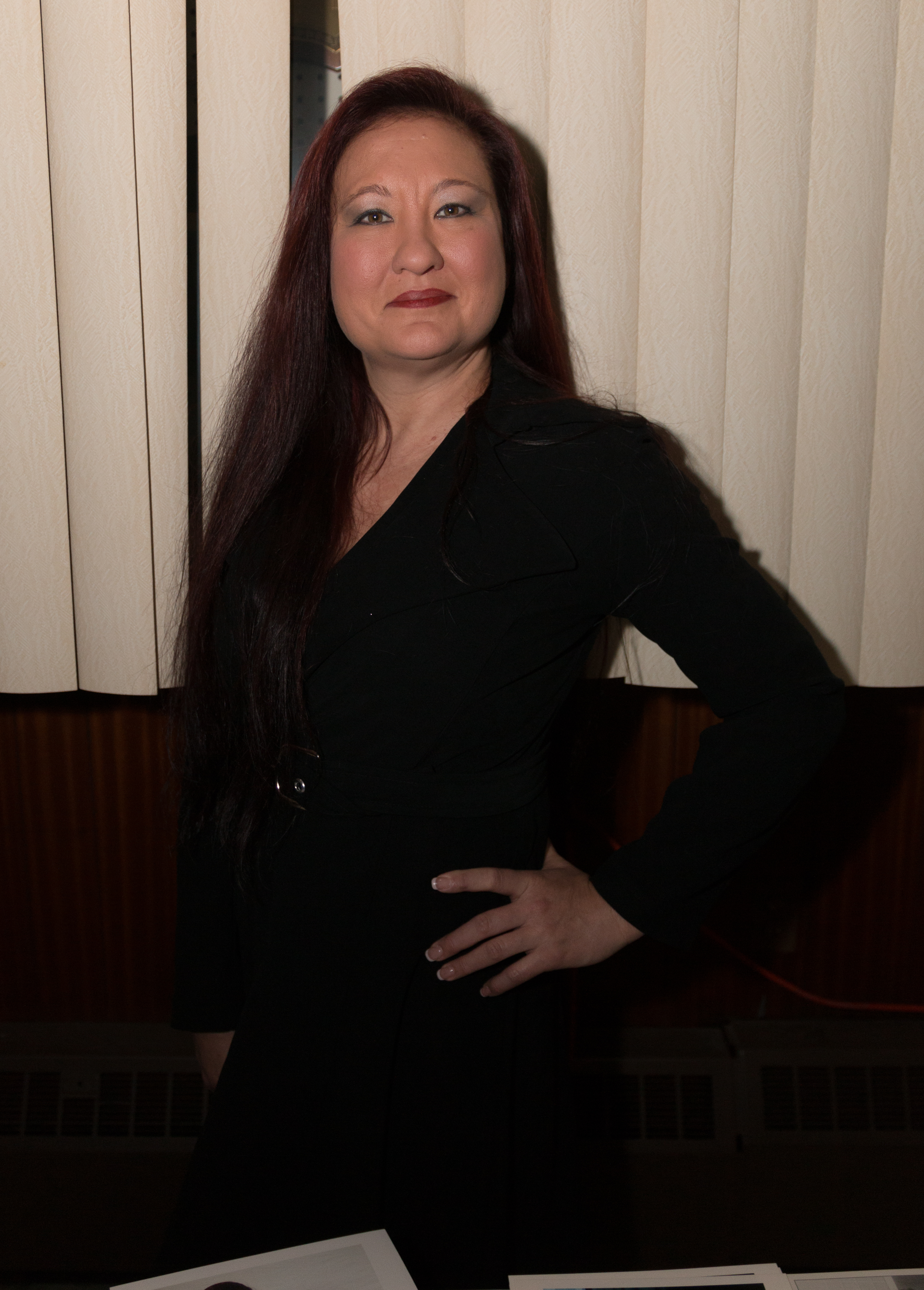
- Hosaka at an independent show in 2016

Personal information
- Born: October 7, 1969 (age 56) Honolulu, Hawaii, U.S.
- Website: http://www.maliahosaka.com/

Professional wrestling career
- Ring name: Malia Hosaka
- Billed height: 5 ft 4 in (163 cm)
- Billed weight: 125 lb (57 kg)
- Billed from: Osaka, Japan
- Trained by: Killer Kowalski
- Debut: August 7, 1987
- Retired: April 13, 2024

Malia Hosaka (born October 7, 1969) is an American professional wrestler. She is a former NWA World Women's Champion.

== Professional wrestling career ==
Hosaka was trained by Killer Kowalski at the wrestling training camp run by Misty Blue Simmes. In her debut match, Hosaka (wearing a Mary Lou Retton-inspired gymnastics outfit and billed as "Malia Ho") teamed with Simmes against Mad Dog Debbie Irons and Linda Dallas.

=== Ladies Professional Wrestling Association (1991–1992) ===
In the early 1990s, Hosaka regularly wrestled for the Ladies Professional Wrestling Association. On February 13, 1992, she teamed with Bambi to challenge the LPWA Tag Team Champions The Glamour Girls on the LPWA Super Ladies Showdown pay-per-view. She competed in the Ladies Major League Wrestling and Women's Pro Wrestling organizations in the early 1990s.

=== Eastern Championship Wrestling (1993) ===
Hosaka debuted in Eastern Championship Wrestling at NWA Bloodfest on October 1, 1993, and defeated Molly McShane. She substituted for Madusa at November to Remember on November 13, 1993 and wrestled against Sherri Martel.

=== Independent circuit and Japan (1993–1998) ===
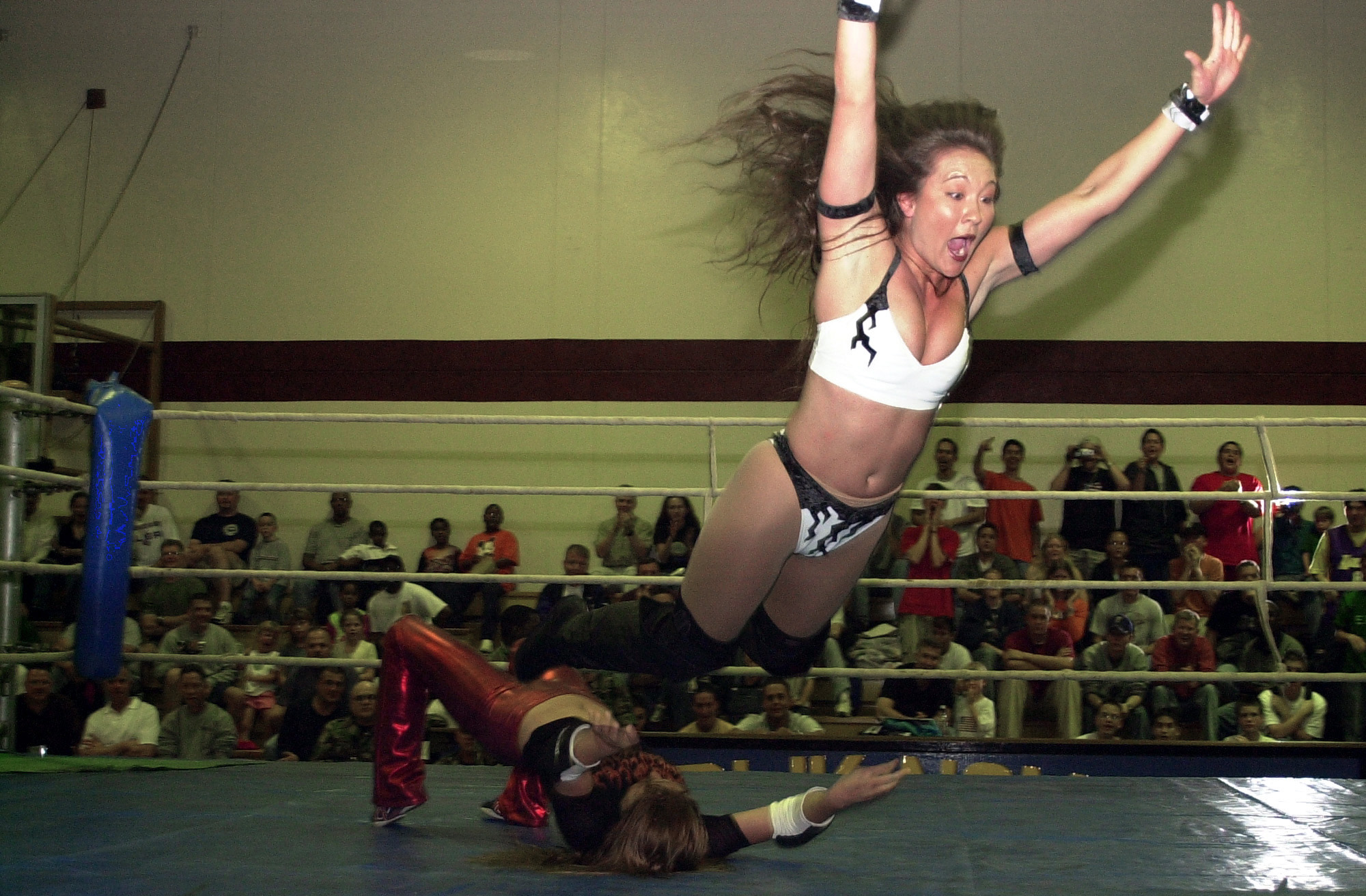
Malia Hosaka being thrown by Valentina

In 1994, Hosaka worked in Japan for Frontier Martial-Arts Wrestling. She also worked in the independent circuit in the East Coast.

=== World Championship Wrestling (1996–1998) ===
Hosaka joined World Championship Wrestling in 1996 and competed in their newly formed women's division. She wrestled in the tournament to crown the first WCW Women's Champion, but was eliminated by Zero. During her tenure in WCW, she was managed by Sonny Onoo and frequently wrestled on WCW Monday Nitro and WCW Saturday Night against Madusa, Leilani Kai and WCW Women's champion Akira Hokuto. In 1997, she competed in the WCW Women's Cruiserweight Championship tournament and was defeated in the finals by Toshie Uematsu. During March 1997, Malia Hosaka wrestled Madusa Miceli. During the memorable match, Madusa became extremely brutal with Malia. She grabbed her by her hair and tossed her around the ring while holding onto her hair. Hosaka wrestled against Saxton in matches taped for WCW Pro on May 16, 1998 and WCW WorldWide on September 19, 1998, and December 26, 1998.

=== Independent circuit (1998–1999) ===
In 1998, Hosaka became a two-time New Dimension Wrestling Women's Champion. She defeated Debbie Combs for the belt on August 7, but lost it to Starla Saxton two weeks later. The next night, Hosaka defeated Saxton to once again become champion. She held the belt for approximately a month and a half until she lost it to The Foxy Lady on November 9, 1998.

In 1999, Hosaka took on longtime rival Brandi Alexander in a non-title match in Tulelake, California, for Rob Russen's IWA Florida promotion. She was billed as IWA Women's World Champion, but did not have the belt with her.

=== World Wrestling Federation (1999–2000) ===
In 1999, Hosaka signed a developmental contract with the World Wrestling Federation. She defeated Brandi Alexander in a dark match on March 29, 1999. She then appeared on the June 28, 1999, edition of Raw Is War as a fan answering Ivory's challenge for her WWF Women's Championship but was instead attacked by Nicole Bass and Ivory until WWF head of security Jim Dotson stopped them. Since she was instantly recognized from her WCW appearances, the proposed "Rocky Balboa" idea for her character fell to the wayside. She accompanied Taka Michinoku to the ring in his challenge for Dean Malenko's WWF Light Heavyweight Championship, but the storyline was not developed further. WWF kept her under contract for a year, and shortly before her contract expired, they considered bringing her to the main roster under the name "Aphrodisia" and pairing her with Essa Rios, who was debuting soon. Instead, the role was given to Amy Dumas and the character was renamed "Lita". Hosaka was then released due to an internal lack of character idea development.

=== Total Nonstop Action Wrestling (2003) ===
After being released by the WWF, Hosaka returned to the independent circuit. She was contacted by David McLane to compete in the Women of Wrestling organization, but Hosaka turned down the offer because she felt McLaine was more interested in hiring models and training them to act like wrestlers. On June 18, 2003, Hosaka competed in Total Nonstop Action Wrestling and was defeated by Trinity.

=== Later Career (2003–present) ===
In 2005, Hosaka appeared at "Wrestle Reunion" in an 8-woman tag team match teaming with Wendi Richter, Bambi, and Jenny Taylor against Sherri Martel, Peggy Lee Leather, Krissy Vaine, and Amber O'Neal.

In 2006, Hosaka became part of the then-fledgling SHIMMER roster. She debuted as a villainess in a losing effort against Lorelei Lee on Volume 3. After the match, the evil Hosaka and Lexie Fyfe attacked Lee in the ring before Cindy Rogers made the save. On Volume 4, Hosaka and Fyfe defeated Lee and Cindy Rogers in a tag team match. During the encounter, Rogers wore spandex tights. On Volume 5, they became an official team under the name The Experience and began a winning streak which was broken by Cheerleader Melissa and MsChif on Volume 12. They started another winning streak which was broken this time by Ashley and Nevaeh in the final of a six-team Gauntlet Match on Volume 21. After missing Volume 23, The Experience came back as part of the Volume 24 as they defeated the team of Rayna Von Tosh and Tenille. Once again, the Experience missed a Volume, but they came back as part of the Volume 26 losing to the team of Nikki Roxx and Ariel. Lexie Fyfe, due to being ill, was not scheduled for the SHIMMER 4th anniversary tapings but Malia was and defeated Tenille, but lost to Ariel in Singles Action. She was also the "Queen of PMA" for Team PMA along with Syren and Evil Zebra.

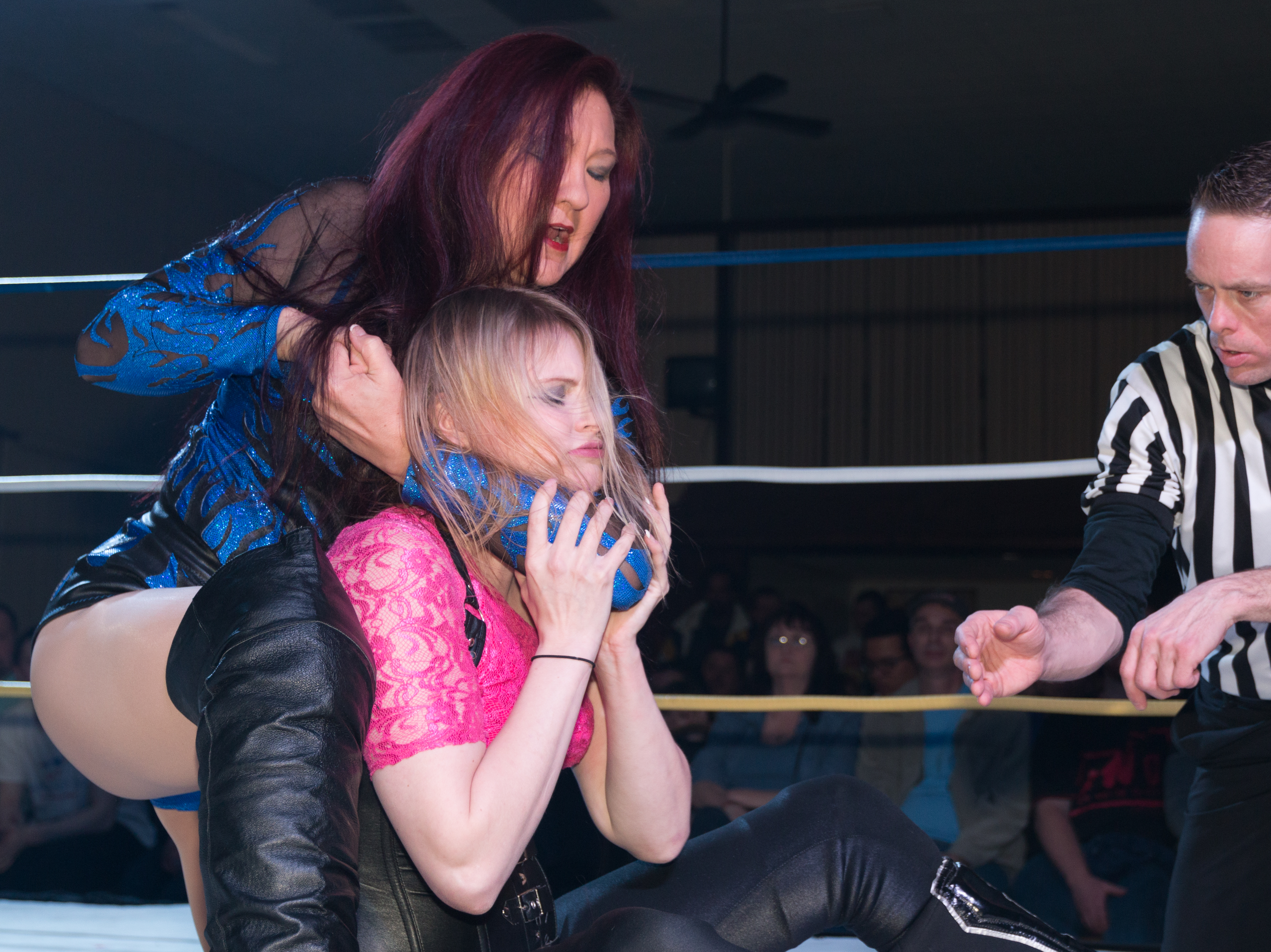
Hosaka puts Ingrid Isley in a headlock, 2016

On July 4, 2009, at the United States Championship Wrestling "Summerbash 2009" show in Macclenny, Florida, Hosaka won the vacant USCW Women's Championship by defeating Amber O' Neal in the finals of the championship tournament match.

On February 17, 2012, via her Facebook she announced her retirement: "It has been a great 25 years, and I am grateful to all the fans who have supported me thru the years! but I am officially retired from the wrestling industry as of today. Thank you to all who supported/employed and believed in me thru the years!" However, Hosaka returned to the ring in 2013 for two matches. She returned to full-time in 2014, becoming SHINE Tag Team Champions with Brandi Wine.

She made an appearance on Rocky Mountain Pro's "Charged" program.

== Personal life ==
Hosaka is half Japanese. She graduated from Citrus High School in Inverness, Florida in 1989 and later that year briefly attended Central Florida Community College in Ocala.

== Championships and accomplishments ==
- Cauliflower Alley Club
  - Women's Wrestling Award (2015)
- International Wrestling Association
  - IWA Women's Championship (1 time)
- National Wrestling Alliance
  - NWA World Women's Championship (1 time)
- New Dimension Wrestling
  - NDW Women's Championship (2 times)
- Pro Wrestling Illustrated
  - Ranked No. 35 of the top 50 female wrestlers in the PWI Female 50 in 2008.
- Shine Wrestling
  - Shine Tag Team Championship (1 time) - with Brandi Wine
- Tulalip Championship Wrestling
  - TCW Women's Championship (2 time)
- Ultimate Championship Wrestling
  - UCW Women's Championship (1 time)
- United States Championship Wrestling
  - USCW Women's Championship (1 time)
- Women Superstars Uncensored
  - WSU Hall of Fame (Class of 2009)
- World League Wrestling
  - WLW Ladies Championship (2 times)
- Wild Women of Wrestling / Ladies Major League Wrestling
  - WWOW/LMLW Junior Championship (1 time)
