= Peggy Lee Leather =

American wrestler (1959–2023)

Personal information
- Born: Peggy Lee Fowler; January 19, 1959 Reynolds, Georgia, U.S.
- Died: May 22, 2023 (aged 64)
- Family: Winona Littleheart (stepsister)

Professional wrestling career
- Ring name(s): Peggy Lee Leather; Peggy Lee Pringle; Peggy Lee; Lady X Thug
- Billed height: 5 ft 7 in (1.70 m)
- Billed weight: 176 lb (80 kg)
- Billed from: Reynolds, Georgia
- Debut: 1980
- Retired: 2013

Peggy Lee Fowler (January 19, 1959 – May 22, 2023), also known by her stage names Peggy Lee Leather, Lady X, and Thug, was an American professional wrestler who worked in the WWF, AWA, and WCW.

== Professional wrestling career ==
=== World Wrestling Federation (1980–1985) ===
Peggy Lee competed in the World Wrestling Federation from 1980 to 1985. In 1984, she formed a tag team with Wendi Richter and frequently challenged WWF Women's Tag Team Champions Velvet McIntyre and Princess Victoria. By 1985, Leather and Richter split up. Richter became a face and won the WWF Women's Championship. Leather challenged Richter for the title, but was unsuccessful. Afterwards she went to Montreal to work for Lutte International in 1986.

=== American Wrestling Association (1986–1988) ===
After leaving the WWF and Montreal, Lee competed in Florida Championship Wrestling as Peggy Lee Pringle, the sister of Percy Pringle. She engaged in a feud with Mad Maxine, who had been battling Percy. She then began working for the American Wrestling Association as Peggy Lee Leather and challenged Madusa Miceli for the AWA World Women's Championship. She also competed in a lingerie battle royal at the SuperClash III pay-per-view event on December 13, 1988.

=== World Championship Wrestling and Later career (1990–2013) ===
Leather also worked for David McLane. She competed in his nationally televised professional women's wrestling league, Powerful Women of Wrestling (POWW). During her time in POWW, she had a notable feud with her former WWF tag team partner Wendi Richter. She also feuded with long-time adversary Bambi.

In 1990, she briefly competed in World Championship Wrestling and was defeated by Bambi on WCW Worldwide. She then joined the Ladies Professional Wrestling Association and competed as Lady X. She defeated Susan Sexton on January 31, 1991, in Laughlin, Nevada, to win the LPWA Championship. At the LPWA Super Ladies Showdown pay-per-view event, she lost the LPWA Championship when she was defeated by Terri Power. After the LPWA closed, she returned to the independent circuit. She competed in the Women's Pro Wrestling organization in the early 1990s. In 1997, she briefly returned to WCW and became a contender for the WCW Women's Championship. While in WCW, she wrestled against her former AWA rival, Madusa, who was the number one contender at the time..

From 2000 to 2001, she wrestled as Thug in David McLane's televised Women of Wrestling promotion, where she frequently feuded with long-time rival Selina Majors (previously billed as Bambi). Thug defeated Majors in a steel cage match at the WOW Unleashed pay-per-view event. Off-camera, Majors and Thug served as trainers for the inexperienced talent.

On January 29, 2005, Leather appeared at Wrestle Reunion in an eight-woman tag team match (teaming with Sherri Martel, Krissy Vaine, and Amber O'Neal), losing to Wendi Richter, Malia Hosaka, Bambi and Jenny Taylor. She retired in 2013.

== Death ==
Leather died on May 22, 2023, at the age of 64.

== Championships and accomplishments ==
- International Wrestling Association
  - IWA Women's Championship (3 times)
- Ladies Major League Wrestling
  - LMLW International Championship (1 time)
- Ladies Professional Wrestling Association
  - LPWA Championship (1 time)
- National Wrestling Alliance
  - NWA World Women's Championship (1 time)
- NWA Blue Ridge
  - NWA Blue Ridge Women's Championship (1 time)
- National Wrestling League
  - NWL Women's Championship (1 time)
- New Dimension Wrestling
  - NDW Women's Championship (1 time)
- Women of Wrestling
  - Princess Jasmine Trailblazer Award (2013)
