= Selina Majors =

American professional wrestler (born 1967)

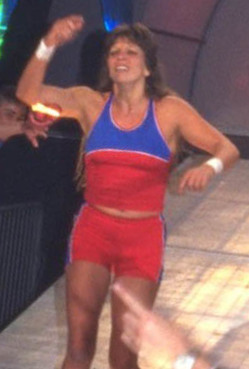
- Majors in 2001

Personal information
- Born: May 24, 1967 (age 59) Stone Mountain, Georgia, U.S.

Professional wrestling career
- Ring name: Selina Majors; Bambi
- Billed height: 5 ft 7 in (170 cm)
- Trained by: The Fabulous Moolah
- Debut: April 16, 1987

Selina Majors (born May 24, 1967), better known by her ring name, Bambi, is an American professional wrestler.

== Professional wrestling career ==
=== Early career ===
Majors debuted as a professional wrestler in 1986 working for David McLane. She competed in his nationally televised professional women's wrestling league, Powerful Women of Wrestling (POWW) as Bambi. In 1987 and 1988, Bambi feuded with AWA World Women's Champion Madusa Miceli. She also competed in a lingerie battle royal at the AWA SuperClash III pay-per-view event on December 13, 1988. In 1988, Bambi joined Continental Wrestling Federation as the valet of Tom Prichard. She aided him in his feud with "Dirty White Boy" Tony Anthony and his valet "Dirty White Girl" Lady Mystic (Kim Anthony).

=== World Championship Wrestling ===
In 1990, World Championship Wrestling recognized Ladies Professional Wrestling Association Champion Susan Sexton as the World Women's Champion. Sexton defended the title against Bambi at Clash of the Champions XII. She also feuded with long-time rival Peggy Lee Leather on WCW Worldwide. By the fall of 1991, Bambi feuded with Madusa, Leilani Kai, and Judy Martin, shortly before WCW phased out its women's division.

=== Independent circuit and Women of Wrestling ===
Bambi also competed in Ladies Major League Wrestling (LMLW) and the Ladies Professional Wrestling Association (LPWA). At the LPWA Super Ladies Showdown pay-per-view event, Leilani Kai and Judy Martin (The Glamour Girls) defeated Bambi and Malia Hosaka to retain the LPWA Tag Team Championship. She competed in the Women's Pro Wrestling organization in the early 1990s. Bambi joined Smoky Mountain Wrestling in 1993 to feud with Tammy Fytch. She teamed with The Rock 'n' Roll Express to wrestle against Brian Lee, Chris Candido, and Fytch in a series of 6-person mixed tag-team matches.

From 2000-2001, she wrestled under her real name in David McLane's televised Women of Wrestling (WOW) promotion, where she frequently feuded with long-time rival Thug. Thug defeated Majors in a steel cage match at the WOW Unleashed pay-per-view event. Off-camera, Majors and Thug served as trainers for the inexperienced talent.

On January 29, 2005, Bambi appeared at Wrestle Reunion in an 8-woman tag team match teaming with Wendi Richter, Malia Hosaka, and Jenny Taylor wrestling against Sherri Martel, Peggy Lee Leather, Krissy Vaine, and Amber O'Neal. On November 19, 2005 in Spartanburg, South Carolina at "A Tribute to Starrcade", she teamed with Lisa Moretti to defeat Team Blondage (Krissy Vaine and Amber O'Neal) for the CCW Tag Team Championship.

== Championships and accomplishments ==
- Cauliflower Alley Club
  - Women's Wrestling Award (2019)
- Carolina Championship Wrestling
  - CCW Women's Tag Team Championship (1 time) – with Lisa Moretti
- International Wrestling Association
  - IWA Women's Championship (3 times)
- Ladies Major League Wrestling
  - LMLW World Championship (3 times)
- National Wrestling Alliance
  - NWA World Women's Championship (2 times)
- NWA Blue Ridge
  - NWA Blue Ridge Women's Championship (2 times)
- National Wrestling League
  - NWL Women's Championship (3 times)
- New Dimension Wrestling
  - NDW Women's Championship (3 times)
- Professional Wrestling Association
  - PWF Women's Championship (1 time)
- Rampage Wrestling Federation
  - RWF Women's Championship (1 time)
- South Atlantic Pro Wrestling
  - SAPW Women's Championship (1 time)
- Virginia Wrestling Association
  - VWA Women's Championship (1 time)
- Other titles
  - ACW Women's Championship (1 time)
  - BTW Women's Championship (1 time)
  - NWA Women's Championship (1 time)
