= Luna Vachon =

American-Canadian professional wrestler (1962–2010)

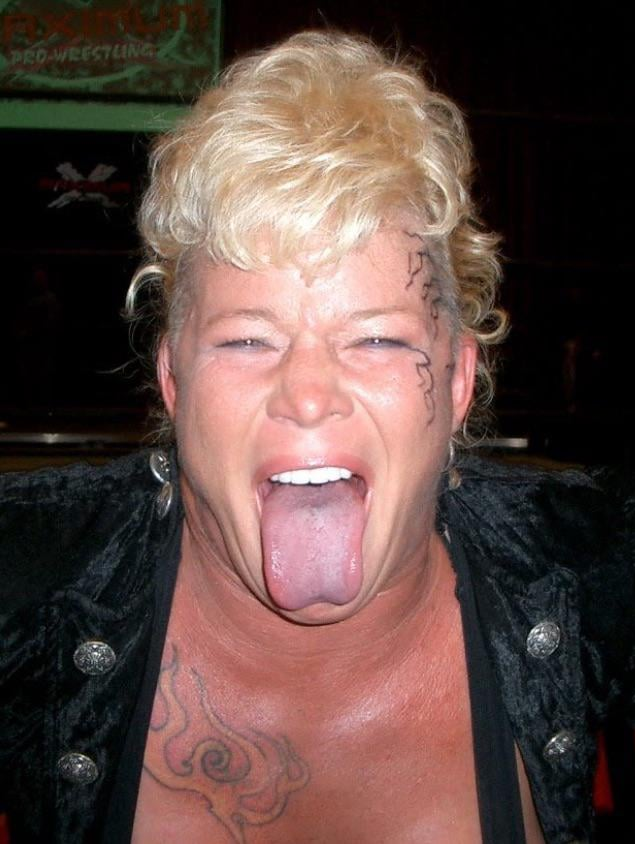
- Vachon in 2003

Personal information
- Born: Gertrude Elizabeth Wilkerson; January 12, 1962 Atlanta, Georgia, U.S.
- Died: August 27, 2010 (aged 48) Pasco County, Florida, U.S.
- Cause of death: Drug overdose
- Spouses: Dan Hurd (m. 1980; div. 1985); Tom Nash (m. 1987; div. 1993); Gangrel (m. 1994; div. 2006)
- Children: 2
- Family: Vachon

Professional wrestling career
- Ring name(s): Luna Vachon; Luna; Princess Luna; Angel Baby; Trudy Herd
- Billed height: 5 ft 6 in (168 cm)
- Billed from: Montreal, Quebec, Canada "The Other Side of Darkness"
- Trained by: Paul Vachon; Vivian Vachon; The Fabulous Moolah
- Debut: 1985
- Retired: 2007

Gertrude Elizabeth Vachon (/vʌˈʃɒn/; January 12, 1962 – August 27, 2010) was an American-Canadian professional wrestler, better known as Luna Vachon. Over her 22-year career, she wrestled for the World Wrestling Federation (now WWE), Extreme Championship Wrestling, the American Wrestling Association, and World Championship Wrestling. She was posthumously inducted into the WWE Hall of Fame, Professional Wrestling Hall of Fame, and Women's Wrestling Hall of Fame.

== Professional wrestling career ==
=== Training ===
As a child, Gertrude Vachon wanted to continue her family's wrestling legacy. Attending wrestling events, she used to play in the ring, which often resulted in training with various World Wide Wrestling Federation stars. Her family objected to her entering the wrestling business and tried to dissuade her, as they considered a wrestler's life at that time too harsh for a female. André the Giant, with whom she was close and who took her on a trip to Paris in 1974, also tried to dissuade her. Around the age of sixteen, she began training under her aunt Vivian and then The Fabulous Moolah.

=== Early career (1985–1992) ===
Gertrude started her professional career wrestling for Moolah's all-women's Professional wrestling school in Columbia, South Carolina. She then moved to Florida and, competing under the ring name Angelle Vachon, became a member of a four-woman wrestling troupe led by Mad Maxine.

In 1985, she debuted in Florida Championship Wrestling, as a young, soft-spoken reporter named Trudy Herd, who was giving Kendall Windham an award. A melee ensued and she was slapped twice by Kevin Sullivan. The angle had her driven mad by Sullivan's treatment and she ended up joining Sullivan's Army of Darkness stable under the new ring name, Luna Vachon. As part of her gimmick, she shaved one half of her head, which was the first step to her trademark Mohawk hairstyle, covered her face in bodypaint, and continuously sneered. Looking back, Vachon expressed her uneasiness about some elements of this angle.

During her time in Florida, Luna teamed up with The Lock as the Daughters of Darkness, a part of Sullivan's Army. The duo also provided back-up vocals for the thrash metal band Nasty Savage. In early 1987, Luna and Lock appeared in the Continental Wrestling Association. During the next three years, Luna also traveled to Japan, where her father Butcher Vachon acted as her manager, as well as Puerto Rico.

She also wrestled in David McLane's Powerful Women of Wrestling (POWW). During POWW's alliance with the American Wrestling Association (AWA), she participated in their only pay-per-view event, SuperClash III in December 1988, competing in a Battle royal.

In the early nineties she took over management of The Blackhearts, a masked tag team coming out of Stu Hart's Stampede Wrestling. The team consisted of Tom Nash — a childhood friend of Luna and her then-husband — and David Heath, her future husband, under the names "Apocalypse" and "Destruction", respectively. Luna worked with them in Joel Goodhart's Tri-State Wrestling, in Herb Abrams' Universal Wrestling Federation, and finally Giant Baba's All-Japan, where the team split up. Luna also worked at Wild Women of Wrestling, as a competitor, commentator, and booker.

=== World Wrestling Federation (1993–1994) ===
In 1992, while wrestling in Puerto Rico, she tried to get David Heath a job with the World Wrestling Federation (WWF), which resulted in the WWF developing an interest in her. They hired her, but not without some complications. No one in the company knew where she was; even her father only knew that she was staying in Florida. The WWF ultimately hired a private investigator to find her. She was found working as a waitress at a restaurant.

Luna's first WWF appearance was in April 1993 at WrestleMania IX, accompanying Intercontinental Champion Shawn Michaels in his match against Tatanka, who was accompanied by Michaels's former valet Sensational Sherri. After the match, Luna attacked Sensational Sherri at ringside, and then again in the first aid area. She was arrested by security, starting a vicious feud between the two.

At the same time Luna and Sherri were at odds, Bam Bam Bigelow had a confrontation with Sherri. This led to him being attacked by Tatanka and the two of them feuding. Soon after, Bam Bam (kayfabe) announced that he had fallen in love and presented Luna as his "main squeeze". He also endearingly called her his "Tick", which fans combined with her name to the chant "Luna-tic". From then, Bam Bam was seen blowing kisses to Luna at the end of matches, and in her honor even included the Moonsault, redubbed Lunasault, into his repertoire.

A mixed tag team match between the two pairs was planned for SummerSlam in 1993, but had to be canceled because Luna (legit) injured her arm and then Sherri left the WWF. Instead, Bigelow and The Headshrinkers fought and lost to Tatanka and The Smoking Gunns in a six-man tag team match. In the autumn of 1993, Bam Bam and Luna ran afoul of some practical jokes from Doink the Clown, leading to a Survivor Series style match at the 1993 event of the same name pitting Bam Bam, The Headshrinkers, and Bastion Booger against four Doinks (actually Men on a Mission and The Bushwhackers in clown makeup).

During this time Luna was the cause of dissension between Bam Bam and his part-time tag team partner Bastion Booger, who had also (kayfabe) fallen in love with her. At WrestleMania X, Bam Bam and Luna finally got their revenge on Doink by beating the Clown and his midget side-kick Dink in a mixed tag team match.

When the WWF's women's division was revived, Luna's old rival Madusa, who had entered the WWF under the name Alundra Blayze, won the Women's Championship. Luna set her eyes on the title and had a series of matches with Alundra, all resulting in victories for Blayze. It was during this time the relationship between Luna and Bam Bam first showed cracks after interference in a match backfired. In the summer, Luna sold Bam Bam's contract to Ted DiBiase, who was beginning to build his "Million Dollar Corporation". Luna then picked Japanese wrestler Bull Nakano to win the Women's title from Blayze, which she eventually did. Luna left the WWF shortly after this title match.

In 1994, Luna was the first woman to appear in a WWF video game, when – despite previous objections – she was included in WWF Raw.

=== Independents and Extreme Championship Wrestling (1994–1997) ===
After leaving the WWF, Luna wrestled on the independent circuit. Upon the recommendation of Kevin Sullivan's wife Nancy, she entered Extreme Championship Wrestling (ECW). She was brought as Tommy Dreamer's new valet in his long running feud with Raven (Scott Levy). Dreamer introduced Luna as "someone out of your past", as Luna had been housemate to Levy in her Florida days and both had simultaneously worked in the WWF.

While in ECW, Luna would stand with Tommy, feuding with Raven and his lackeys, which included Stevie Richards, and even her husband The Vampire Warrior (who, in kayfabe, had become jealous of the time she was spending with Dreamer). She had more than a few physical confrontations with Richards, including a steel cage match at Heatwave '95: Rage in the Cage!, which she won.

In the same year, she was rated #306 in the PWI 500 – the second woman to be included in that list after Miss Texas.

In 1996/97, she competed in Puerto Rico for the World Wrestling Council and American Wrestling Federation, using the name Angel Baby, and the IWA Mid-South.

=== World Championship Wrestling (1997) ===
In early 1997, Luna had a short run with World Championship Wrestling (WCW), again going after her rival Madusa. Luna interfered in Madusa's matches against WCW Women's Champion Akira Hokuto, preventing a title win by Madusa. Luna and Madusa met each other in a series of matches, including a match at the 1997 Slamboree. Although Luna dominated the matches, Madusa managed to get the pinfall every time.

=== Return to WWF (1997–2000) ===
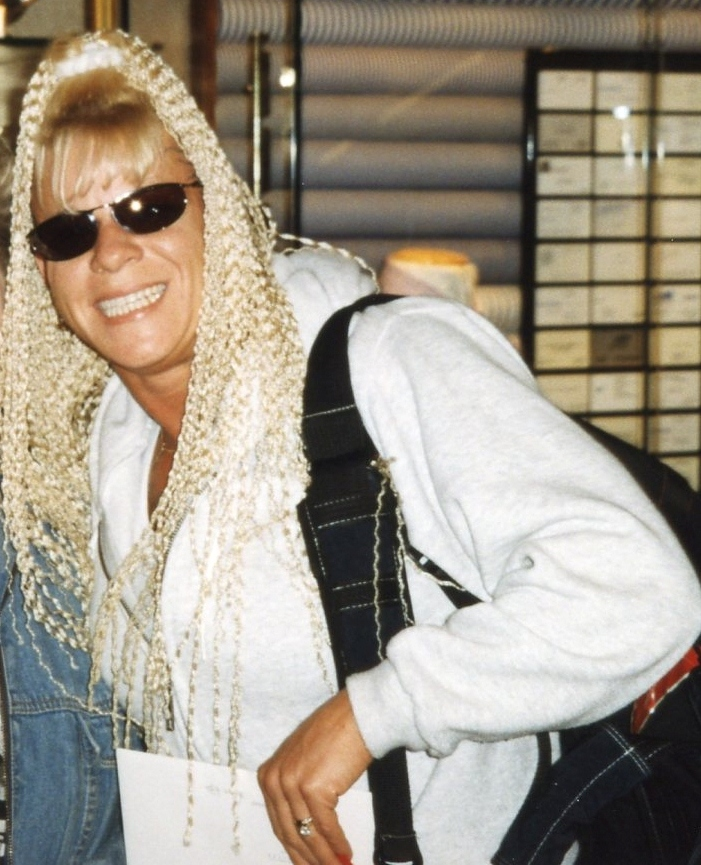
Vachon during her second WWF stint

Luna then returned to the WWF, first as Goldust's manager, helping him to reinvent himself as "The Artist Formerly Known as Goldust". The pair sported a variety of different outfits and roles, including a dominatrix, a slave, a "New Year Baby", and his nurse. Their first feud was against Vader. Luna's first appearance was on the November 24, 1997, episode of Raw had her wheeling the allegedly paralyzed Goldust to the ring and then blinding Vader with some "medical fluid".

Later when Goldust, dressed like a Christmas tree, recited poems in the ring, he was attacked by Santa Claus, who turned out to be Vader. Vader eventually defeated Goldust at the 1998 Royal Rumble. The Goldust/Luna pairing also took to imitating other wrestler's gimmicks, often those of Goldust's opponents. At one point Goldust and Luna impersonated European Champion Triple H and Chyna in a title match against Owen Hart. What Triple H had intended as a joke resulted in Owen beating Goldust and Commissioner Slaughter awarding the title to Hart, considering Goldust to be a legit replacement.

At this time, Goldust also teamed up with Marc Mero, which led to another feud, as Luna and Mero's valet Sable started to fight outside of the ring. The feud culminated in a mixed tag team match at WrestleMania XIV, pitting the two couples against each other. After this, Luna challenged Sable to an Evening Gown match at Unforgiven and scored the victory by stripping her opponent down to her underwear.

The animosity between Luna and Sable was not entirely kayfabe. As Sable's popularity increased, she adopted a presumptuous attitude towards other competitors. According to Luna, as the two trained in the preparation for their WrestleMania match, Sable refused to learn how to "take bumps", while Luna was threatened by WWF officials that hurting her opponent in the ring would put her job in jeopardy.

Sable also annoyed Luna with bragging about being promised the Women's Championship, a goal that had eluded Vachon. Luna was also hurt after she had carried Sable in their match, as Sable was universally congratulated while Luna was only consoled by Owen Hart. Still, Luna described the match as a highlight in her career.

In August 1998, Luna had apparently patched up her differences with Sable, as the latter, now split from Marc Mero, introduced her as the newest member of the Human Oddities stable. Luna attacked Marc Mero's new valet Jacqueline, the former Miss Texas. Luna scored a pinfall victory in August, but lost a rematch in September. In December, Sable, who had won the reinstated WWF Women's Championship, was attacked by the masked "Spider Lady", who turned out to be Luna. She justified her heel turn and attack towards her partner with the words: "It's about me, it's about what I deserve."

In this feud against Sable, Shane McMahon personally supported Luna's efforts to win the championship after taking personal offense to Sable's attitude towards him and booked a Leather Strap match at the Royal Rumble. Leading up to that event, in the storyline, Luna was repeatedly attacked by an obsessed Sable fan. At the Royal Rumble, Sable successfully retained the title thanks to the interference of that fan, who now entered WWF competition as Tori. During the weeks prior to the Royal Rumble, Luna also defeated Gillberg, a WWF parody of World Championship Wrestling's star Goldberg. Luna was due to challenge Sable for another title shot several weeks later at St. Valentine's Day Massacre, but the match was canceled due to Luna's suspension for fighting with Sable backstage.

Six months later, Luna returned at SummerSlam, chasing then Women's Champion Ivory backstage after a successful title defense against Tori. This started a feud between the two with Luna even scoring a pinfall victory during an impromptu, non-title match. At Unforgiven, however, she lost to Ivory in a Hardcore Rules match. During that feud, Luna also answered a challenge from then Intercontinental Champion Jeff Jarrett and defeated him via disqualification, thanks to Ivory's interference.

From then on, Luna reassumed her role as manager for her husband, now working for the WWF under the name Gangrel, participating in several mixed tag team matches and helping Gangrel beat his opponents.

At Survivor Series in 1999, she joined forces with her former rivals Ivory, Jacqueline, and Terri Runnels, against Tori, Debra, The Fabulous Moolah, and Mae Young. Luna's team was defeated when Moolah pinned Ivory. At the Royal Rumble in 2000, she participated in the Swim Suit Contest, though in protest against the whole event she refused to take off her gown. This angle reflected Luna's legit dissatisfaction with the "sexualization" of the WWF's women's division. Vachon then became involved in a brief feud with Jacqueline after the latter had pinned Harvey Wippleman to capture the Women's title.

She was the first person to challenge Jacqueline on the February 7 edition of Raw, but failed following a German suplex. Gangrel, who accompanied her to ringside, responded by executing his Impaler DDT on the champion. This led to a mixed tag on the following episode of SmackDown, in which Vachon and Gangrel defeated Moore and her partner Prince Albert. She was later released from the WWF in early 2000 due to another outburst backstage.

=== Later career (2000–2007) ===
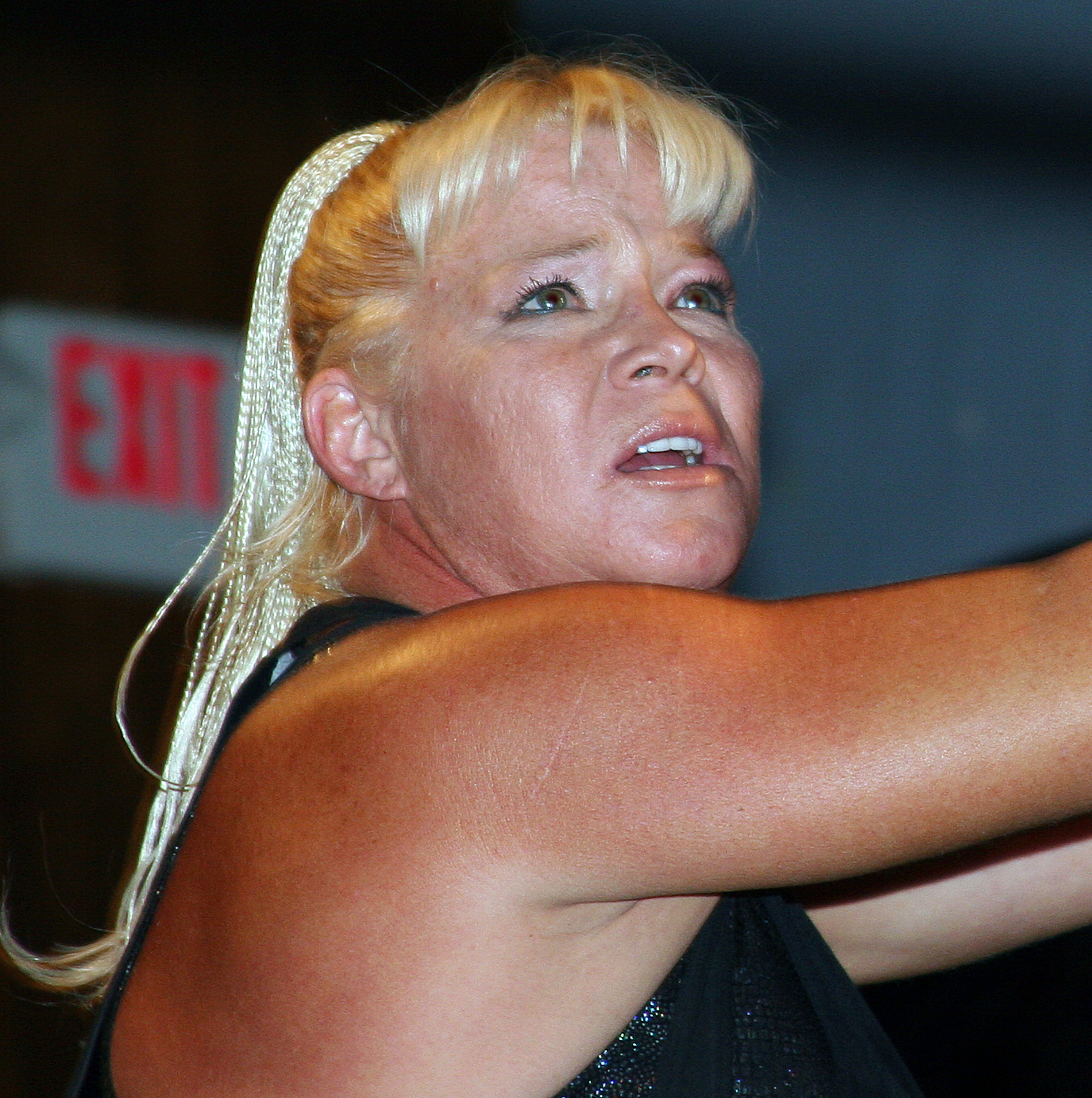
Vachon in 2007

After leaving the WWF, Luna continued to manage Gangrel during her independent tours all over the world, as well as wrestling on her own. Venues included the IWA Puerto Rico in 2000, the Australian World Wrestling All-Stars in 2001, the German EWP in 2003, the British ASW in 2006 and WSU in 2007.

Whilst touring the UK with WWA in 2001 she was defeated by her husband Gangrel in a Black Wedding Match.

On June 9, 2007, Luna became the first Great Lakes Championship Wrestling (GLCW)'s Ladies champion defeating Traci Brooks. On December 5, 2007, Luna Vachon announced her retirement; her last match took place on December 7 for GLCW in Milwaukee. She successfully defended her GLCW Ladies Championship against Traci Brooks and then retired as champion.

== Personal life ==
Born in Atlanta, Georgia, to Charles Henry Wilkerson, a hotel owner and Rebecca "Van" Pierce, Luna's biological father Charles Wilkerson committed suicide in his hotel in Atlanta in 1966. Paul "Butcher" Vachon, who was staying at the hotel that night, took care of a devastated Van while she was grieving in the hotel and married her, his second wife. He also adopted the four-year old Luna and continued to raise her as his daughter after the marriage split. By virtue of the adoption, Luna is also the niece of "Mad Dog" Vachon and Vivian Vachon. She was also close to André the Giant.

Luna was married three times, first to Dan Hurd, with whom she had two sons, Joshua (born 1980) and Vincent "Van" (born 1982), who competed on Seasons 6 and 17 of Fox's reality cooking show Hell's Kitchen, hosted by Gordon Ramsay. After breaking up, she dated Dick Slater for a while until Slater began physically abusing her. She then married childhood friend Tom Nash.

After Nash and Vachon split, David Heath, Nash's tag team partner in The Blackhearts, and Vachon married on October 31, 1994. During this marriage, she was stepmother to David's sons, David Jr. and Donavan. The two divorced in 2006 but, according to Heath, remained best of friends. She had three grandchildren, Lauren, Austin and Neila. She was featured in both Playboy and Hustler.

Luna was diagnosed with bipolar disorder. She became a born again Christian in 2004, after attending an Athletes International Ministry conference. She was baptized by fellow wrestler Nikita Koloff along with her then-husband David Heath. In 2007, she worked as a tow truck operator in Port Richey, Florida.

== Final years and death ==
Luna was honored in April 2009 at the 44th annual Cauliflower Alley Club reunion, given the "Ladies Wrestling Award" in Las Vegas, Nevada. One of her fondest memories about the wrestling business was being able to visit children as part of the Make-A-Wish Foundation. After her retirement, Luna took an interest in fellow Canadian wrestlers and especially monitored the career of Nattie Neidhart, the daughter of fellow wrestler and friend Jim Neidhart.

Around Christmas 2009, Vachon's house was destroyed by a fire, in which she lost her wrestling-related memorabilia and other possessions. After the fire, she stayed at her mother's home and joined her father and his third wife Dee on a cruise in February 2010. The fire prompted a call from fellow wrestler and friend Mick Foley and others, for fans to send Luna-related memorabilia to Vachon's post office box. Foley also suggested that TNA bring her in to manage Tommy Dreamer at the Hardcore Justice pay-per-view in August 2010, but Vachon turned down the offer, stating that she had retired.

On the morning of August 27, 2010, she was found dead by her mother at her home in Pasco County, Florida. She was 48 years old. According to the District Six Medical Examiner's Office in Florida, she died from an "overdose of oxycodone and benzodiazepine". Investigators had previously found crushed pill residue and snorting straws at multiple locations inside Vachon's house. Vachon had become addicted to medication at some point and underwent rehabilitation, paid for by WWE, which she completed in June 2009.

== Legacy ==
On April 7, 2015, The Mountain Goats released a pro wrestling concept album called Beat the Champ where one song, Luna, is named after Vachon.

She was posthumously inducted into the WWE Hall of Fame's legacy wing (class of 2019), into the Professional Wrestling Hall of Fame in 2020, and into the Women's Wrestling Hall of Fame in 2023.

Vice TV's docuseries Dark Side of the Ring aired an episode about Vachon on October 14, 2021.

She was the subject of Kate Kroll's 2025 documentary film Lunatic: The Luna Vachon Story.

== Championships and accomplishments ==
- American Wrestling Federation
  - AWF Women's Championship (1 time)
- Canadian Pro-Wrestling Hall of Fame
  - Class of 2022
- Cauliflower Alley Club
  - Ladies Wrestling Award (2009)
- Great Lakes Championship Wrestling
  - GLCW Ladies Championship (1 time)
- Ladies Major League Wrestling
  - LMLW World Championship (1 time)
- Memphis Wrestling Hall of Fame
  - Class of 2022
- Powerful Women of Wrestling
  - POWW Tag Team Champion (2 times) – with Hot Rod Andie
- Pro Wrestling Illustrated
  - Ranked No. 306 of the top 500 singles wrestlers of the year in the PWI 500 in 1995
- Professional Wrestling Hall of Fame and Museum
  - Class of 2020
- South Coast Championship Wrestling
  - SCCW Women's Championship (1 time)
- Sunshine Wrestling Federation
  - SWF Ladies' Championship (1 time)
- United States Wrestling Association
  - USWA Women's Championship (1 time)
- Wild Women of Wrestling
  - WWOW Television Championship (1 time)
- Women Superstars Uncensored
  - WSU Hall of Fame (Class of 2011)
- Women's Wrestling Hall of Fame
  - Class of 2023
- World Wrestling Entertainment
  - WWE Hall of Fame (Class of 2019) Legacy Inductee
- Other Titles
  - Universal Women's Hardcore Championship

== See also ==
- List of premature professional wrestling deaths
