= Ken Blackman =

American football player (born 1972)

No. 66
- Position: Guard

Personal information
- Born: November 8, 1972 (age 53); Brunswick, Georgia, U.S.
- Listed height: 6 ft 6 in (1.98 m)
- Listed weight: 320 lb (145 kg)

Career information
- High school: Abilene (TX) Wylie
- College: Illinois
- NFL draft: 1996: 3rd round, 69th overall pick

Career history
- Cincinnati Bengals (1996–1999); Tampa Bay Buccaneers (1999)

Career NFL statistics
- Games played: 35
- Games started: 31
- Stats at Pro Football Reference

Kenneth Blake Blackman (born November 8, 1972) is an American former professional football player who was a guard for three seasons with the Cincinnati Bengals of the National Football League (NFL). He was selected in the third round of the 1996 NFL draft. His playing weight was listed as 320 pounds. He played college football at the University of Illinois and high school at Wylie High School in Abilene, Texas.

Blackman lives with his wife, Charity, in Monmouth, Illinois. He was married to former professional wrestler Debrah Miceli from 1998 to 2008.
