= Mad Maxine =

American journalist and professional wrestler

Personal information
- Born: Jeannine Mjoseth; 1959 West Germany
- Education: University of South Florida

Professional wrestling career
- Ring name(s): Lady Maxine; Mad Maxine
- Billed height: 6 ft 4 in (193 cm)
- Billed weight: 170 lb (77 kg)
- Trained by: Beverley Shade; Boris Malenko; Donna Christianello; Fabulous Moolah
- Debut: 1984
- Retired: 1986

Jeannine Mjoseth is a journalist, photographer, independent art curator, and retired professional wrestler better known by her stage names Mad Maxine and Lady Maxine. During her stint in the World Wrestling Federation (WWF), the 6'4" wrestler had a green mohawk and was managed by Fabulous Moolah. After leaving the WWF in 1985, she wrestled on the independent circuit, primarily in Florida. She then retired from wrestling, pursuing a career in journalism, as well as working for the National Institute of Aging and the National Human Genome Research Institute.

== Professional wrestling career ==
=== World Wrestling Federation (1985) ===
Mjoseth was first introduced to professional wrestling after meeting a friend's boyfriend who worked as a wrestler. His mother, Beverly Shade, also worked as a wrestler and agreed to talk with Mjoseth. A couple of years after graduating college, she once again became interested in becoming a professional wrestler, so she moved to Columbia, South Carolina to train with Fabulous Moolah at her wrestling school. While a trainee at Moolah's school, Mjoseth cut her hair into a mohawk and developed the Mad Maxine persona. The look, which also included leather lace-up wrestling gear that she sewed herself, was modeled on characters in the "Mad Max" films and the X-Men comic book character Storm.

As Mad Maxine, Mjoseth appeared in the World Wrestling Federation (WWF) in 1985 managed by Moolah. Maxine (accompanied by Moolah) defeated Susan Starr in her first WWF match that aired on the March 31, 1985 edition of All American Wrestling. She was accompanied again by Moolah for her second WWF match, which was against Desiree Petersen on April 16, 1985. Although she was initially brought into the WWF to feud with Wendi Richter for the WWF Women's Championship, the two women never wrestled against each other.

She began appearing in WWF merchandising at this time and was originally animated for the CBS Saturday morning cartoon titled Hulk Hogan's Rock 'n' Wrestling, appearing in early commercials and print advertisements for the cartoon. Her character on the show would have been named "Mad" Maxine Ryder, and would have driven a "punk cycle" as her vehicle. Mjoseth claims that Moolah never told her about the WWF's intention for her to be in the cartoon. Mjoseth left the company before the cartoon's debut, and Moolah took over her role. Mjoseth claims to have left the company because she was happier working as a journalist and did not like the percentage Moolah received of her earnings. She also needed further in-ring training.

=== Championship Wrestling From Florida (1985-1986) ===
Mjoseth relocated to Florida with Luna Vachon and Peggy Lee Pringle to work with booker Wahoo McDaniel as "Lady Maxine". She was involved in a storyline feud with Peggy Lee Pringle and her brother Percy Pringle. She also had matches with Luna Vachon in February 1986.

=== Continental Championship Wrestling (1986) ===
Mjoseth appeared in Continental Championship Wrestling in January and February 1986 as the bodyguard of Norvell Austin. She assisted him in his feud with "Exotic" Adrian Street and Miss Linda.

=== Universal Wrestling Federation (1986) ===
In April 1986 in the Universal Wrestling Federation, Lady Maxine became the manager of Jack Victory. She accompanied him in singles matches, as well as 6-man tag team matches where he was paired with The Sheepherders. While managing Victory, she became involved in a feud with Dark Journey. The two women engaged in numerous cat fights from April through June 1986. They also competed in a mixed tag team match which pitted Maxine and Victory against Dark Journey and Koko Ware. The feud between Maxine and Dark Journey ended with Maxine being run out of UWF. In actuality, she chose to retire from professional wrestling (since she had grown tired of the business) and focus on her journalism career.

== Professional wrestling style and personal ==
As Mad Maxine, Mjoseth had a "colorful Mohawk" and wore "biker gear", with journalist Paul Guzzo describing her as "a cross between X-Men comic character Storm and someone from the apocalyptic world in which the Mad Max movies were set."

Mad Maxine wrestled in a "powerhouse" style. Her finishing move was a vertical suplex.

== Personal life ==
Mjoseth is of Norwegian descent, but was born in West Germany and grew up as an army brat. She received a scholarship to play basketball at the University of Kentucky and played with the Kentucky Wildcats for two years (1977–1979) before choosing to take a sabbatical from college studies. She lived with her sister in Washington, D.C., and worked odd jobs. She eventually decided to return to college but turned down an athletic scholarship with the University of South Florida (USF). Instead she focused on journalism and wrote for the school newspaper. After graduating from the University of South Florida with a bachelor's degree in communication and journalism in 1982, she worked as a writer and photographer for the Hillsborough Community Newspaper and as a reporter in Sun City Center, Florida. During her wrestling training period, she was editor of The Black News after infiltrating a Ku Klux Klan rally on freelance assignment.

She spent seven years working with the National Institute of Aging (2000–2007) and developed an arts-based program called Vital Visionaries. She was the Acting Chief of Communications for the National Human Genome Research Institute. Mjoseth also worked as a video artist and independent art curator. She appeared in an episode of the HBO television series Real Sex in the 1990s, which featured an erotic art auction she had curated. She published The Chronicles of Mad Maxine, a novel based on her experiences training to become a professional wrestler.
