= Susan Sexton =

Australian professional wrestler

Shanon Sexton
Personal information
- Born: Perth, Western Australia, Australia

Professional wrestling career
- Ring name: Susan Sexton
- Billed height: 5 ft 6 in (1.68 m)
- Billed weight: 130 lb (59 kg)
- Trained by: Ali Musa the Turk
- Debut: 1975
- Retired: 1996

Shanon Sexton, better known by her stage name Susan Sexton, is a former professional wrestler. Sexton was born in Perth, Western Australia. She was trained by Ali Musa the Turk.

== Wrestling career ==
Sexton went to the United States in 1975 and began working for Mildred Burke. After briefly working for Burke, she began working independent cards around the world. In 1989, she worked for the American Wrestling Association.

=== Ladies Professional Wrestling Association ===
Sexton joined the Ladies Professional Wrestling Association and was the first woman awarded the LPWA Singles Championship. She defended the title against numerous opponents. In 1990, World Championship Wrestling recognized Sexton (then the LPWA champion) as the World Women's Champion. Sexton defended the title against Bambi at Clash of the Champions XII: Fall Brawl '90.

She lost the title to Lady X on 31 January 1991 in Laughlin, Nevada.

== Retirement ==
Sexton relocated to Los Angeles and then New York, where she works as a psychic and medium and also does photography.

== Acting career ==
Sexton acted as a wrestler in the 1989 film American Angels: Baptism of Blood in which most of the cast were members of the now defunct Powerful Women of Wrestling.

== Championships and accomplishments ==
- Cauliflower Alley Club
  - Other honoree (1995)
- Ladies Professional Wrestling Association
  - LPWA Championship (1 time)
