= Diane Von Hoffman =

American professional wrestler (1962 – 2017)

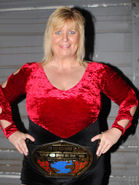

Personal information
- Born: Phyllis Burch; April 13, 1962 Louisville, Kentucky, United States
- Died: July 6, 2017 (aged 55) Louisville, Kentucky, United States

Professional wrestling career
- Ring name(s): Diane Von Hoffman; The Teutonic Terror; Moondog Fifi; Lady Beast
- Billed height: 5 ft 7 in (1.70 m)
- Billed weight: 165 lb (75 kg)
- Trained by: The Fabulous Moolah; Dale Mann
- Debut: 1981
- Retired: 2013

Phyllis Burch (April 13, 1962 – July 6, 2017) was an American professional wrestler active from 1979 to 2013. Burch wrestled under the names Diane Von Hoffman, The Teutonic Terror, and Lady Beast. She wrestled in Memphis' United States Wrestling Association (USWA) in the 1990s as Moondog Fifi, a member of The Moondogs stable. She also wrestled for the Ladies Professional Wrestling Association, Continental Wrestling Association, and Ladies Major League Wrestling.

== Professional wrestling career ==
Burch initially trained with Dale Mann while attending Fern Creek High School. She also trained under The Fabulous Moolah at her training school beginning in 1981. While training, Burch worked at a local IHOP to make money. She originally worked as Moolah's tag team partner and used the ring name Diane Von Hoffman. She also worked in Japan, the Philippines, and Canada with Leilani Kai. In Japan, she worked as The Teutonic Terror, a German villainess.

In the 1990s, she worked in the USWA as Moondog Fifi, a member of The Moondogs stable. She was ringside as their manager in June 1992, when The Moondogs lost the USWA Tag Team Championship to Jeff Jarrett and Jerry Lawler in a steel cage match. In September 1992, she won the USWA Women's Championship from Miss Texas. That same year, as part of The Moondogs' ongoing feud with Jarrett and Lawler, her head was shaved in the middle of the ring. The feud between the Moondogs and Jarrett and Lawler was later voted "Feud of the Year" by Pro Wrestling Illustrated.

She also worked in Continental Wrestling Federation as Lady Beast.

== Personal life ==
Burch was previously married to fellow wrestler Ringo Mercanerio, with whom she had two daughters named Melissa and Marla. She died on July 6, 2017, at the age of 55 after knee surgery.

== Championships and accomplishments ==
- Pro Wrestling Illustrated
  - Feud of the Year (1992) – The Moondogs vs Jeff Jarrett and Jerry Lawler
- United States Wrestling Association
  - USWA Women's Championship (1 time)
