= IWCCW Women's Championship =

Professional wrestling women's championship

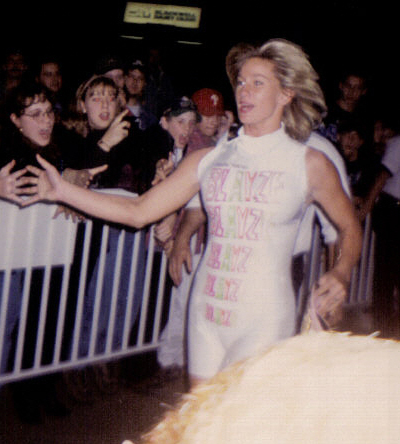
- Madusa Miceli held the championship in 1993

Details
- Promotion: International Championship Wrestling (1985–January 1991); International World Class Championship Wrestling (January 1991–1995)
- Date retired: 1995

Other name(s)
- ICW Women's Championship
Statistics
- First champion(s): Misty Blue

The ICW / IWCCW Women's Championship was a women's professional wrestling championship in International World Class Championship Wrestling that existed from 1985 until the federation closed its doors in 1995. The title was first promoted as the “International Championship Wrestling Women’s Title” but was later renamed the “International World Class Championship Wrestling Women’s title” when the federation was renamed as well. The Women's title is the earliest ICW created title in existence with both the ICW Tag-team and the ICW Heavyweight title being created after ICW and WWC stopped working together. The Women's title was only defended sporadically as ICW/IWCCW infrequently featured female competitors. Because the championship is a professional wrestling championship, it is not won or lost competitively but instead by the decision of the bookers of a wrestling promotion. The championship is awarded after the chosen team "wins" a match to maintain the illusion that professional wrestling is a competitive sport.

== Title history ==
Key
No.	Overall reign number
Reign	Reign number for the specific champion
Days	Number of days held

No.	Champion	Championship change			Reign statistics		Notes	Ref.
No.	Champion	Date	Event	Location	Reign	Days	Notes	Ref.
1	Misty Blue	1985	ICW Show	(Note: The location of the match was not captured as part of the championship documentation.)	1	(Note: The championship history is unclear, not possible to calculate reign)	Defeated Michele Paris to win the championship	
Championship history is unrecorded from 1985 to 1988.
2	Heidi Lee Morgan	September 1, 1987 (NLT)	ICW Show		1			
3	Jamie West	October 1, 1987 (NLT)	ICW Show		1			
Championship history is unrecorded from 1988 to May 7, 1993.
4	Heidi Lee Morgan	March 4, 1988 (NLT)	ICW Show		1			
Championship history is unrecorded from 1988 to May 7, 1993.
5	Madusa Miceli	May 7, 1993	ICW Show	Southampton, New York	1			
—	Vacated	1993	—	—	—	—	Held up when Madusa Miceli joined the World Wrestling Federation	
6	Phantom Mist	February 1994 (NLT)	ICW Show		1		Awarded the championship.	
—	Deactivated	1995	—	—	—	—	IWCCW Closed down.	
