= Ladies Professional Wrestling Association =

Professional wrestling promotion

- Acronym: LPWA
- Founded: 1989
- Defunct: 1998
- Style: Women's professional wrestling
- Headquarters: Laughlin, Nevada (1989–1992)
- Founder: Tor Berg
- Owner: Tor Berg (1989–1992; 1998–2000)

The Ladies Professional Wrestling Association (LPWA) was a women's professional wrestling promotion which operated in the early 1990s (ca. 1989–1992). It was considered a successor to such women's promotions as Gorgeous Ladies of Wrestling (GLOW), but it differed in that, while GLOW slanted more toward WWF-style sports entertainment, the LPWA treated its product seriously and put its primary emphasis on in-ring athletics.

== History ==
Thurston John "Tor" Berg (1938–2011) founded the company ca. 1989. An incident occurred in March 1991, where Berg promised Jumping Bomb Angels member Noriyo Tateno that he would give her a permanent job in the new company if she retired in Japan and moved to the United States. Berg, however, later backed out on the deal, and Sherri Martel made the incident public.

The LPWA produced two television series, The Super Ladies of Wrestling and Ladies Championship Wrestling from 1990 to 1992. Many of their matches were also distributed and sold on VHS tapes. They held their first and only pay-per-view, Super Ladies Showdown, on February 23, 1992, before closing down operations shortly after.

Berg planned on promoting a second Super Ladies pay-per-view event in 2000, but the event was canceled. The pay-per-view was scheduled to feature women from around the world, including American wrestlers Debbie Malenko, Sherri Martel, Sweet Destiny and Missy Hyatt; Japanese wrestlers Chikako Shiratori, AKINO, Chapparita Asari and Ayako Hamada; and Australian wrestlers Amy Action, Raya Riot, and former LPWA Champion Susan Sexton.

== Super Ladies Showdown ==
Super Ladies Showdown
- Promotion: LPWA
- Date: February 23, 1992
- City: Rochester, Minnesota
- Venue: Mayo Civic Center
- Attendance: 400

LPWA Super Ladies Showdown was a professional wrestling pay-per-view from the LPWA. It took place on February 23, 1992, from the Mayo Civic Center in Rochester, Minnesota. It was the only PPV from the LPWA, which folded shortly after the event. The main event was a match for the LPWA Singles Championship, in which Terri Powers faced Lady X. The event also featured a tournament for the LPWA Japanese Championship.

=== Results ===
No.	Results	Stipulations	Times
1	Mami Kitamura and Miki Handa defeated Allison Royal and Lisa Starr	Tag Team match	3:46
2	Denise Storm defeated Susan Green	LPWA Japanese Championship Tournament First Round match	6:02
3	Reggie Bennett defeated Yukari Osawa	LPWA Japanese Championship Tournament First Round match	6:19
4	Shinobu Kandori defeated Desiree Petersen	Singles match	4:31
5	Harley Saito defeated Mizuki Endoh	LPWA Japanese Championship Tournament First Round match	7:06
6	Eagle Sawai defeated Midori Saito	LPWA Japanese Championship Tournament First Round match	5:43
7	Black Venus (with Boogaloo Brown) defeated Rockin' Robin	Singles match	5:39
8	Denise Storm defeated Reggie Bennett by disqualification	LPWA Japanese Championship Tournament Semi-Final match	8:27
9	Harley Saito defeated Eagle Sawai by points	LPWA Japanese Championship Tournament Semi-Final match	10:00
10	The Glamour Girls (Judy Martin and Leilani Kai) (c) defeated Bambi and Malia Hosaka	Tag Team match for the LPWA Tag Team Championship	8:47
11	Harley Saito defeated Denise Storm	Tournament Final match for the LPWA Japanese Championship	8:07
12	Terri Power defeated Lady X (c)	Singles match for the LPWA Championship	8:36
(c) / – the champion(s) heading into the match

== Championships ==
=== LPWA Championship ===
The LPWA Championship was a professional wrestling title created in early 1990.

Key
No.	Overall reign number
Reign	Reign number for the specific champion
Days	Number of days held

No.	Champion	Championship change			Reign statistics		Notes	Ref.
No.	Champion	Date	Event	Location	Reign	Days	Notes	Ref.
1	Susan Sexton	January 1990	N/A	N/A	1	N/A	Sexton was awarded the championship.	
2	Lady X	January 31, 1991	LPWA show	Laughlin, NV	1	388		
3	Terri Power	February 23, 1992	LPWA Super Ladies Showdown	Rochester, MN	1	N/A		
—	Deactivated	1992	—	—	—	—	The championship was abandoned after the LPWA closed.	

=== LPWA Japanese Championship ===
The LPWA Japanese Championship was a professional wrestling title created in 1992. The inaugural (and only) champion was Harley Saito, who won an eight-woman tournament held during the Super Ladies Showdown pay-per-view event.

==== Inaugural championship tournament (1992) ====
Quarterfinals
Denise Storm	Pin
Susan Green	6:02
Yukari Osawa	6:19
Reggie Bennett	Pin
Mizuki Endoh	7:06
Harley Saito	Pin
Eagle Sawai	Pin
Midori Saito	5:43

Semifinals
Denise Storm	DQ
Reggie Bennett	8:27
Harley Saito	PTS
Eagle Sawai	10:00

Final
Denise Storm	8:07
Harley Saito	Pin

Key
No.	Overall reign number
Reign	Reign number for the specific champion
Days	Number of days held

No.	Champion	Championship change			Reign statistics		Notes	Ref.
No.	Champion	Date	Event	Location	Reign	Days	Notes	Ref.
1	Harley Saito	February 23, 1992	LPWA Super Ladies Showdown	Rochester, MN	1	N/A	Saito defeated Denise Storm in the finals of an eight-woman tournament to become the inaugural champion.	
—	Deactivated	1992	—	—	—	—	The championship was abandoned after the LPWA closed.	

=== LPWA Tag Team Championship ===
The LPWA Tag Team Championship was a professional wrestling tag team title created in early 1990.

Key
No.	Overall reign number
Reign	Reign number for the specific champion
Days	Number of days held

No.	Champion	Championship change			Reign statistics		Notes	Ref.
No.	Champion	Date	Event	Location	Reign	Days	Notes	Ref.
1	Team America (Heidi Lee Morgan and Misty Blue)	March 13, 1990	LPWA show	Laughlin, NV	1	352	Team America defeated Bad, Black and Beautiful (Bad Girl and Black Venus) to become the inaugural champions.	
2	The Glamour Girls (Judy Martin and Leilani Kai)	February 28, 1991	LPWA show	Laughlin, NV	1	N/A	Also billed as The Queen's Court.	
—	Deactivated	1992	—	—	—	—	The championship was abandoned after the LPWA closed.	

=== LPWA Mixed Tag Team Championship ===
The LPWA Tag Team Championship was an existing professional wrestling tag team title recognized in early-mid 1990. In 1973, Adrian Street and Miss Linda won the World Mixed Tag Team Championship by defeating Don Kovaks and Suzie Parker in Germany. Street and Linda were still undefeated as champions when they joined the LPWA in 1990 and continued to defend the championships in the promotion.

Key
No.	Overall reign number
Reign	Reign number for the specific champion
Days	Number of days held

No.	Champion	Championship change			Reign statistics		Notes	Ref.
No.	Champion	Date	Event	Location	Reign	Days	Notes	Ref.
1	Adrian Street and Miss Linda	January 1990	LMLW show	N/A	1	N/A		
—	Deactivated	1990	—	—	—	—	The championship was abandoned after Adrian Street and Miss Linda left LPWA by the end of 1990.	

== Alumni ==
=== Wrestlers ===
==== Female wrestlers ====
- Allison Royal (Christine Arrant)
- Alona Star
- Alma Alvarez
- Babyface Nellie
- Bad Girl
- Bambi (Selina Majors)
- The Beast (Peggy Patterson)
- Black Venus (Jean Kirkland)
- Brandy Wine
- Brittany Brown
- Candi Devine (Candace Rummel, also billed as The Goddess)
- Cheryl Day
- Cheryl Rusa (also billed as Little Mo)
- Comrade Orga Stalinska
- Dawn Marie (Dawn Marie Johnston)
- Dangerous Debbie T Wild
- Denise Storm
- Desiree Petersen
- Despina Montagas
- Diane Von Hoffman
- Eagle Sawai
- Flame
- Harley Saito
- Heidi Lee Morgan
- Judy Martin (Judy Hardee)
- Kimmie Kozak
- La Gata
- Lady Lilith (also billed as Miss Lily Tedesco)
- Lady X (Peggy Lee Leather)
- Leilani Kai (Patricia Schroeder)
- Lisa Starr
- Madusa Miceli (Debra Miceli)
- Magnificent Mimi (Mimi Lesseos)
- Malia Hosaka
- Mami Kitamura
- Midori Saito
- Miki Handa
- Miss Linda
- Misty Blue Simmes (Diane Syms)
- Mizuki Endoh
- Nasty Kat (Kat LeRoux)
- Nasty Linda (Linda Dallas)
- Reggie Bennett (also billed as Big Mo)
- Rockin' Robin (Robin Smith)
- Rusty "The Fox" Thomas
- Samantha Pain
- Shelly Francis (also billed as "The Desert Rose" Sheba)
- Shinobu Kandori
- Sindy Paradise
- Susan Green
- Susan Sexton
- Sweet Georgia Brown (Jacqueline Moore)
- Terri Power (Terri Poch)
- Tina Moretti (Lisa Moretti)
- Wendi Richter
- Yukari Osawa

==== Male wrestlers ====
- Adrian Street (also manager of Miss Linda)
- Barry Horowitz
- Tim Horner

=== Tag Teams ===
- Bambi and Malia Hosaka
- Bad Black and Beautiful (Bad Girl and Black Venus with Boogaloo Brown)
- The Glamour Girls (The Queen's Court) (Leilani Kai and Judy Martin with Christopher Love)
- Locomotion (Big Mo/Reggie Bennett and Little Mo/Cheryl Rusa)
- The Mighty Mites (Cheryl Rusa and Sindy Paradise)
- The Nasty Girls (Nasty Kat/Kat LeRoux and Nasty Linda/Linda Dallas)
- New Team America (Misty Blue Simmes and Allison Royal)
- Rockin' Robin and Wendi Richter
- Team America (Misty Blue Simmes and Heidi Lee Morgan, later Heidi Lee Morgan and Comrade Orga Stalinska)

==== Mixed Tag Teams ====
- Adnan Al-Kaissie and Sheba
- Adrian Street and Miss Linda
- Barry Horowitz and Lisa Starr
- Tim Horner and Malia Hosaka

=== Other on-air talent ===
Commissioner

- Wally Karbo

Managers

- Adnan Al-Kaissie (also occasional wrestler)
- Ashley Kennedy (also occasional wrestler)
- Boogaloo Brown
- Jonathan Blue
- Norman (Mike Shaw)
- "Queen" Christopher Love (Bert Prentice)

Announcers

- Jim Cornette
- Joe Pedicino
- Ken Resnick
- Mick Karch
- Nick Bockwinkel
- Sgt. Slaughter (Robert Remus)

Interviewer

- Boni Blackstone
