= Tori (wrestler) =

American professional wrestler (born 1964)

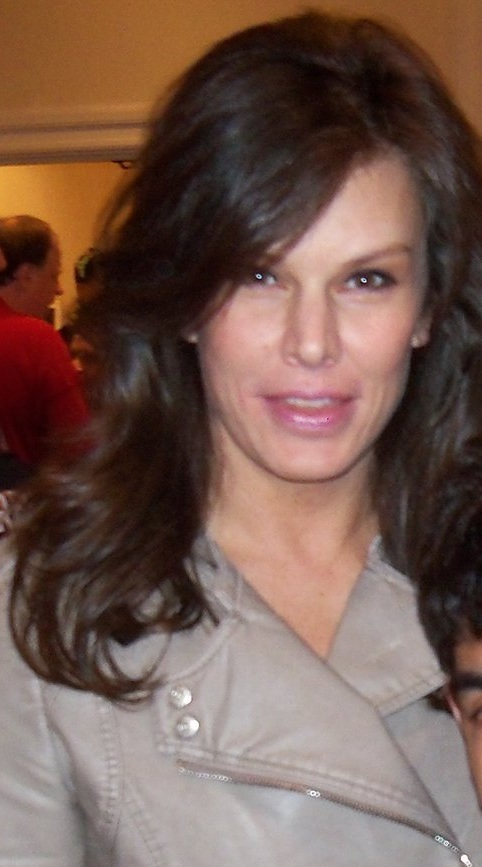
- Tori in 2011

Personal information
- Born: Terri Poch; August 20, 1964 (age 62) Portland, Oregon, U.S.

Professional wrestling career
- Ring name(s): Taylor Made; Terri Power; Tori; The Black Ninja
- Billed height: 5 ft 11 in (180 cm)
- Billed weight: 140 lb (64 kg)
- Billed from: Portland, Oregon
- Trained by: Brad Rheingans; Roddy Piper
- Debut: 1988
- Retired: September 2001

Terri Poch (born August 20, 1964) is an American retired professional wrestler, best known for her time with the World Wrestling Federation (WWF) under the ring name Tori.

== Professional wrestling career ==
=== Early career (1988–1993) ===
Poch debuted in 1988 as Taylor Made, a valet for Scotty the Body in Portland's Pacific Northwest Wrestling.

She joined the Ladies Professional Wrestling Association (LPWA) in 1990 as Terri Power, defeating both Leilani Kai and Judy Martin within her first year with the company. On February 23, 1992 at Super Ladies Showdown in Rochester, Minnesota in the Mayo Civic Center, she defeated Lady X for the LPWA Championship. She was never defeated for the title, as the LPWA ceased operations shortly after her victory. She also teamed with Reggie Bennett during their mutual stint with the short-lived organization.

In the summer of 1992, Poch began wrestling for All Japan Women's Pro-Wrestling. She competed in the Japan Grand Prix, finishing ninth, and the Fuji Network tag team tournament with Kyoko Inoue as her partner. She remained in Japan until 1993, when she took a hiatus from wrestling.

=== World Wrestling Federation (1998-2001) ===
==== Sable's fan; early feuds (1998–1999) ====
In 1998, Poch was hired by the World Wrestling Federation (WWF). She debuted on the December 28 episode of Raw entering the ring before a match to hand Sable a yellow rose. She continued in becoming an obsessed fan over the next few weeks, constantly at ringside during Sable's matches. At the Royal Rumble, she helped Sable defeat Luna Vachon in a strap match. She later introduced herself as Tori and tried to gain the respect of Sable, who continually degraded and humiliated her. Tori defeated Luna in a singles match which resulted in a disqualification against Luna. Tori soon challenged Sable to a match for the Women's Championship at WrestleMania XV, which Sable won following interference from her bodyguard, Nicole Bass. Following Wrestlemania Tori and Ivory went on to defeat Sable and Jacqueline with Tori pinning Jacqueline via a backslide, immediately after Tori challenged Sable but this was cut short by the Ministry of darkness who came to the ring to pursue Sable.

Tori feuded with Jacqueline in April and May 1999 scoring several pinfalls over Jacqueline and then began pursuing Ivory's Women's Championship in July. Tori scored a pinfall over Lexie Fyffe prior to her match against Ivory at SummerSlam, Ivory would go on to retain her championship. Tori defeated Ivory the following night in an evening gown match and after this their feud became more and more heated, leading to the first-ever WWF women's Hardcore match on the September 6, 1999 edition of Raw. Ivory retained her title once more in a match which involved Tori having a mirror smashed over her head and being burnt with an iron. On September 26, Tori attempted to gain a measure of retribution by attacking Ivory during a match but instead was pushed into a crate by Ivory. Tori was part of an 8-woman Survivors Series match in 1999 where her team would go on to be the victors. She wrestled Luna, Ivory and Jaqueline in a femme fatale four-way match at the UK pay per view Rebellion in 1999. Tori wrestled The Kat in a thong chocolate pudding match which resulted in a loss on the December 13 episode of Raw.

==== Kane's girlfriend and D-Generation X (1999–2000) ====
Tori returned in November and soon became the on-screen girlfriend of Kane. She was challenged by male wrestler X-Pac to a match on the December 14 episode of Smackdown, which resulted in a losing effort. On December 16, Tori complained to Triple H and Stephanie McMahon about Kane, by now feuding with his former tag team partner X-Pac, an ally of Triple H, being placed in a Handicap match. Stephanie retorted by challenging Tori to a match that night, which she accepted. Stephanie, however, replaced herself with X-Pac, who defeated Tori with ease as Kane was ambushed backstage by the Mean Street Posse. Tori defeated The British Bulldog in a house show match following the Mean Street Posse incident. Kane received a shot at the WWF Championship on December 20 but with the stipulation that, if he lost to the incumbent champion Big Show, Tori would have to spend the Christmas weekend with X-Pac. Kane lost after the New Age Outlaws distracted him. Tori insisted upon her return, however, that X-Pac had been a perfect gentleman. Around the same time, Tori began to become paranoid, and grew hysterical after Test hugged her. Kane promptly destroyed Test in the ring, believing Tori's claims that he had harassed her. Other wrestlers began to exploit Tori's neuroticism, using it to unleash Kane on their enemies. This included Mankind, who manipulated the duo into attacking a fake Mankind hired by Triple H, and Chyna, who manipulated Tori to get Kane to attack Chris Jericho.

Kane continued to feud with X-Pac, and on January 27, 2000, he was ambushed in the ring by the McMahon-Helmsley Faction when tricking him into joining DX, X-Pac's allies. After tying Kane up, X-Pac revealed that Tori was now his girlfriend. Tori began accompanying X-Pac and his partner Road Dogg to the ring, becoming a member of the new D-Generation X in a brief heel turn. She helped X-Pac defeat Kane (who was now accompanied by Paul Bearer) at No Way Out, but was unable to stop Kane from defeating him at WrestleMania 2000 and was also given a Stink Face from Rikishi during the match. Additionally, she helped Stephanie McMahon win the Women's Championship from Jacqueline in March by hitting a DDT on Jacqueline. Although she stopped competing in regular matches, she was a special guest referee for the first women's battle royal which featured Lita, Ivory, Jacqueline, The Kat and Terri Runnels. She helped Stephanie retain her title by attacking Lita and allowing Stephanie to enter the ring and claim victory. She continued to participate in high-profile storylines with the McMahon-Helmsley faction for the next few months. Along with X Pac and the Road Dogg she began feuding with the Dudley Boyz, twice putting Bubba Ray Dudley through a table. At the King of the Ring in June, Tori, X-Pac, and Road Dogg participated in a table and dumpster match against the Dudley Boyz that ended with the Dudleyz powerbombing her through a table. Poch was sidelined with a torn labrum on June 24, which Jim Ross described as an unfortunate set-back to her push. She underwent surgery with Dr. James Andrews. On the October 30 edition of Raw, Tori returned in a segment at WWF New York, confronting and slapping X-Pac due to the events at King of the Ring.

==== The Black Ninja (2001) ====
Poch returned in January 2001 as The Black Ninja, a masked villainess in a black bodysuit who helped Raven retain the Hardcore Championship. Raven's Hardcore title feud with Crash Holly, led to a feud between The Ninja and Crash's on-screen cousin Molly Holly. Holly finally unmasked the ninja on the March 11, 2001 episode of Sunday Night HEAT, revealing her to be Tori. Subsequently, Poch's character was removed from television.

After working as a trainer on WWF Tough Enough throughout the summer of 2001, Poch was released by the WWF in September 2001. At the time, she made accusations about Scott Levy (Raven), claiming he had verbally abused her. WWF road agent Gerald Brisco and Executive Vice President of Talent Relations Jim Ross claimed, however, that these allegations were not true.

She subsequently retired from wrestling to concentrate on her career as a yogini. Two decades later DX was inducted into the WWE Hall of Fame, however, Poch's name was not mentioned.

== Outside of wrestling ==
Before beginning a career in professional wrestling, Poch worked as a bodybuilder and fitness model. Following her release from the WWF, she has been working as a yogini and currently runs a yoga studio in Portland.

== Other media ==
=== Video games ===
Tori has appeared in four WWE video games. She made her in-game debut at WWF WrestleMania 2000, and appeared in WWF No Mercy, WWF SmackDown! and WWF SmackDown! 2: Know Your Role.

=== Filmography ===
Film
Year	Film	Role	Notes
1996	The Silencers	Mariam	Film debut
Television
Year	Title	Role	Notes
2001	18 Wheels of Justice	Desiree	Episode: Come Back, Little Diva
2001	WWE Tough Enough	Herself/Trainer	Two episodes
2003	The Best Sex Ever	Dancer	Episode: Bump and Grind

== Championships and accomplishments ==
- Ladies Professional Wrestling Association
  - LPWA Championship (1 time)
