= Heidi Lee Morgan =

American professional wrestler (born 1966)

Personal information
- Born: June 29, 1967 (age 59) Newfield, New Jersey
- Children: 1

Professional wrestling career
- Ring name(s): Daisy Mae; Heidi Lee Morgan
- Billed weight: 124 lb (56 kg)
- Trained by: The Fabulous Moolah; Johnny Rodz; Wolfgang Von Heller
- Debut: 1987
- Retired: 1997

Heidi Lee Morgan (born June 29, 1967) is an American retired professional wrestler who competed in the World Wrestling Federation, International World Class Championship Wrestling, Ladies Pro Wrestling Association, and National Wrestling Federation. She was also a member of the wrestling stable Team America.

== Professional wrestling career ==
Morgan began her career at the age of ten, under the name Daisy Mae, as the valet for her father Les Morgan. Several years later, Morgan pursued a career as a bodybuilder and was approached at an exhibition by Vince McMahon about a wrestling career. After deciding to join the family business, she was trained by The Fabulous Moolah, Johnny Rodz and Wolfgang Von Heller. After working on the independent circuit in North and South Carolina, she joined the National Wrestling Federation. As part of the Federation, Morgan feuded with Wendi Richter. She battled Richter, the NWF Women's Champion, in a first ever women's steel cage match in May 1987.

Morgan later held the LPWA Tag Team Championship with Misty Blue Simmes and the WWWA Ladies Championship during her career.

On December 13, 1993, at WWF All American Wrestling, Morgan challenged Alundra Blayze in the tournament finals for the vacant WWF Women's Championship, however, was unsuccessful.

After giving birth to her daughter, Morgan wanted to revive her wrestling career in 1997, but she broke her back in her first match back in the ring. She attempted an aerial maneuver, but she and her opponent lost their balance, which resulted in the break.

== Personal life ==
Morgan married a man named Archie and had a daughter named Adrianna.

Her family owns a professional wrestling school called Ringmasters Wrestling School.

== Championships and accomplishments ==
- Ladies Professional Wrestling Association
  - LPWA Tag Team Championship (1 time) – with Misty Blue Simmes
- International World Class Championship Wrestling
  - IWCCW Women's Championship (1 time)
- Virginia Wrestling Association
  - VWA Women's Championship (2 times)
- Women's Wrestling Hall of Fame
  - Class of 2024
- World Wide Wrestling Alliance
  - WWWA Woman's Championship (2 times, first)
