= Misty Blue Simmes =

American professional wrestler (born 1959)

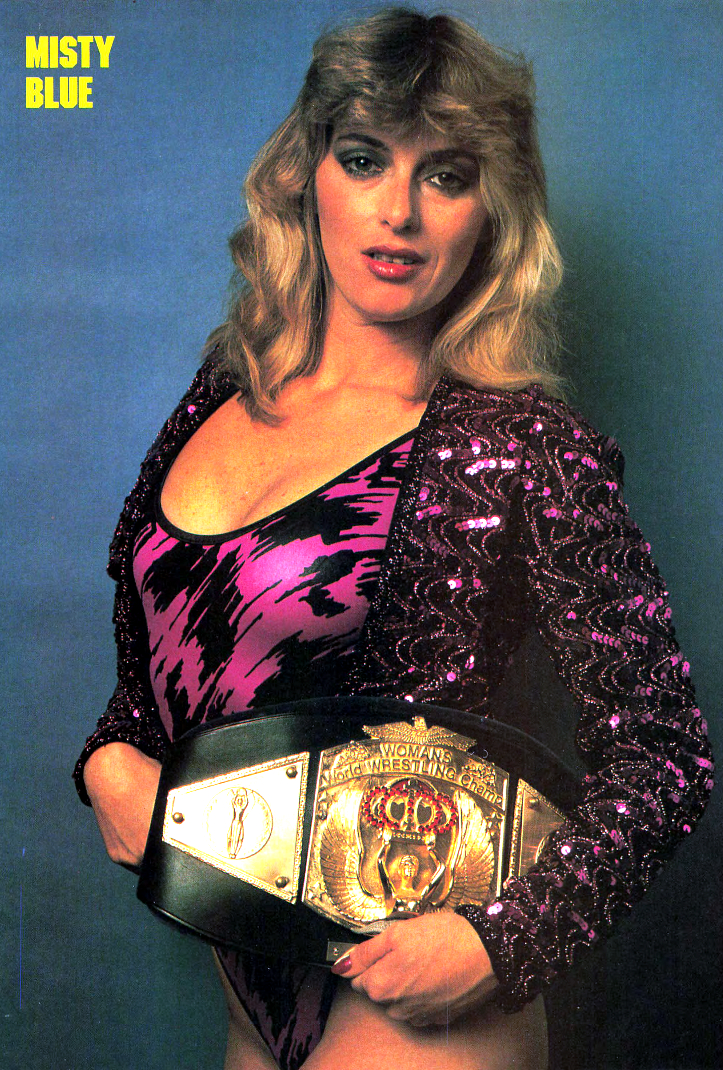
- Misty Blue, c. 1987
- Born: Diane Cotton Simmes; February 8, 1959 (age 67)
- Other name: Bunny Hatton
- Occupation: Professional wrestler
- Years active: 1981–1997
- Spouse: Jon Simmes
- Children: 2
- Professional wrestling career
- Ring name(s): Misty Blue; Misty Blue Simmes
- Trained by: Killer Kowalski
- Debut: 1985
- Retired: 1997

Diane Simmes (born February 8, 1959), better known by her ring name Misty Blue Simmes, is an American former professional wrestler.

== Career ==
=== Beginning ===
Simmes got into wrestling after learning to box and being part of an all-female boxing show. From there, she was invited to Killer Kowalski's wrestling school where she trained for 18 months prior to her first match.

=== American Wrestling Association ===
Simmes competed for the American Wrestling Association in a 10-woman battle royal at WrestleRock 86 on April 20, 1986. The match was won by Sherri Martel.

=== National Wrestling Alliance ===
In 1986, Simmes joined the National Wrestling Alliance (NWA) and was awarded the NWA United States Women's Championship (a replacement of the prior NWA World Women's Championship held by Debbie Combs). She once challenged Combs to a title unification match (NWA United States Women's Title and NWA World Women's Title), but was attacked by Combs' manager/mother Cora Combs. She frequently defended the NWA U.S. Women's Title against Linda Dallas, Kat LeRoux, Black Venus, Mad Dog Debbie Irons and a handful of other women on the NWA's TV programs World Wide Wrestling and World Championship Wrestling. Many of the matches between Dallas and Simmes ended with the two battling each other with Dallas' kendo stick. She also frequently partnered with Heidi Lee Morgan and Vula in tag-team matches.

She also briefly feuded with Jim Cornette. During a televised interview on TBS, Simmes requested that Cornette help train her only to lure him into the ring and nail him with a drop kick. When the Midnight Express hit the ring, Dusty Rhodes appeared to even the sides. Simmes then competed in an 8-person mixed tag team match partnering with Rhodes, Nikita Koloff, and Barry Windham against Cornette, The Midnight Express, and Dick Murdoch. However, the angle never reached the popularity of Cornette's similar feud with Baby Doll.

While Madusa Miceli was the reigning AWA World Women's Champion, Simmes challenged her to a title unification match (NWA United States Women's Title and AWA World Women's Title) at a Delta Tiger Lilies event, but the match never happened.

=== Independent circuit ===
When the NWA phased out the women's division in late 1989, Simmes wrestled on the independent circuit and eventually joined the Ladies Professional Wrestling Association. She and Heidi Lee Morgan competed as Team America and won the LPWA Tag Team Titles. They lost the titles to The Glamour Girls.

Misty feuded with Monster Ripper in Puerto Rico and won a title from her. There are unverified reports that Misty may have lost some matches, but no visual or readily available written proof seems to exist.

=== World Championship Wrestling ===
In late 1991, Simmes wrestled in World Championship Wrestling, which had evolved from the Jim Crockett Promotions branch of the NWA. She competed in matches against Linda Dallas and Kat LeRoux.

== Personal life ==
She is married to Jon Simmes.

Prior to becoming a professional wrestler, Simmes and her husband Jon appeared and performed in several pornographic films during the early-to-mid 1980s, with Simmes performing under the pseudonym Bunny Hatton. In 1983, Simmes appeared in the pornographic film "Slit Skirts" in a scene with Ron Jeremy.

== Championships and accomplishments ==
- International World Class Championship Wrestling
  - IWCCW Women's Championship (1 time)
- International Wrestling Association
  - IWA Women's Championship (1 time)
- International Wrestling Federation
  - IWF Women's Championship (1 time)
- Ladies Professional Wrestling Association
  - LPWA Tag Team Championship (1 time) – with Heidi Lee Morgan
- National Wrestling Alliance
  - NWA United States Women's Championship (1 time)
  - NWA Hall of Fame (Class of 2012)
- Women's Wrestling Hall of Fame
  - Class of 2025
- World Wrestling Council
  - WWC Women's Championship (1 time)
- Américas Wrestling Federation (Puerto Rico)
  - AWF World Womens Championship (1 time)
- World Wide Wrestling Alliance
  - WWWA Woman's Championship (1 time)
- Other titles
  - BBP (Vermont) Women's Championship
  - NCW/IWA Intercontinental Women's Championship
  - NCW/IWA United States Women's Championship
