= Madusa =

American professional wrestler and monster truck driver (born 1963)

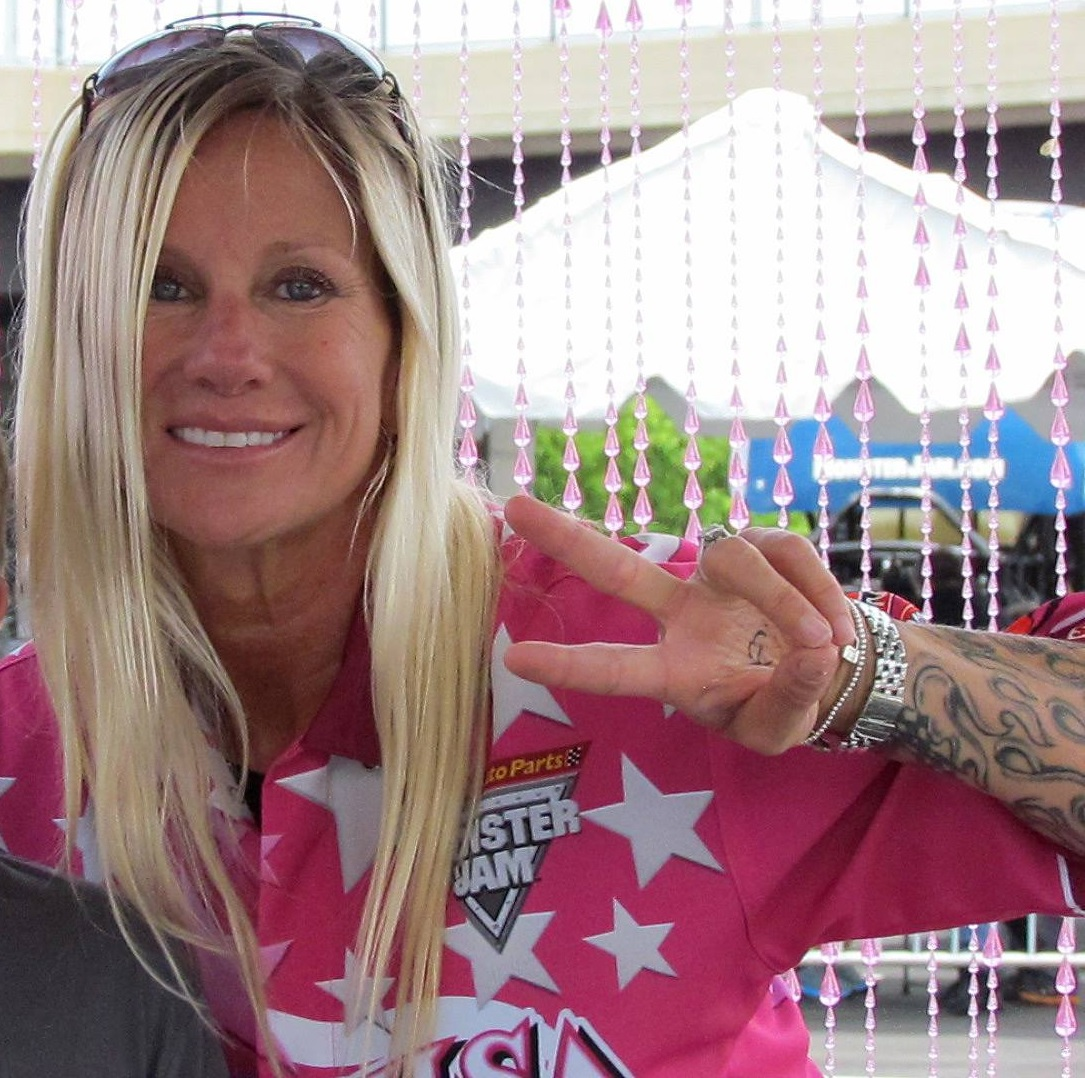
- Miceli in 2013

Personal information
- Born: Debrah Anne Miceli; February 9, 1963 (age 63) Minneapolis, Minnesota, U.S.
- Spouses: Eddie Gilbert (m. 1990; div. 1990) Ken Blackman (m. 1998; div. 2008) Alan Jonason (m. 2011)
- Website: madusa.com

Professional wrestling career
- Ring name(s): Alundra Blayze; Madusa; Madusa Miceli
- Billed height: 5 ft 10 in (1.78 m)
- Billed weight: 150 lb (68 kg)
- Trained by: Brad Rheingans; Eddie Sharkey
- Debut: 1984
- Retired: 2018

Debrah Ann Miceli (born February 9, 1963), better known as Madusa, is an American monster truck driver and retired professional wrestler. She is currently signed to the National Wrestling Alliance (NWA) as a producer. In professional wrestling Miceli is also known by the ring name Alundra Blayze, which she used while in the WWF/WWE.

Outside of the WWF, she wrestled under her professional name of Madusa, which was shortened from "Made in the USA". Her early career was spent in the American Wrestling Association, where she once held the AWA World Women's Championship. In 1988, she was the first woman to be awarded Pro Wrestling Illustrated's Rookie of the Year. The following year, she signed a contract with All Japan Women's Pro-Wrestling, making her the first foreign wrestler to do so.

She later joined World Championship Wrestling (WCW), where she was a member of The Dangerous Alliance, a group of wrestlers managed by Paul E. Dangerously. In 1993, she joined the rival World Wrestling Federation (WWF) under the name Alundra Blayze. In the WWF, she feuded with Bull Nakano and Bertha Faye, while holding the WWF Women's Championship three times. Two years after joining the WWF, Miceli returned to WCW, showing up on an episode of Monday Nitro to throw the WWF Women's Championship belt into a trash can; she was blacklisted by the WWF for the next 20 years as a result. In her second WCW run, Miceli feuded with Bull Nakano and Oklahoma, and became the first woman to hold the WCW World Cruiserweight Championship, as well as the first and only woman to win a championship in WWF and WCW. After training wrestlers such as Torrie Wilson, Stacy Keibler, and Nora Greenwald (Molly Holly) at the WCW Power Plant, she left the company in 2001. On March 28, 2015, she was inducted into the WWE Hall of Fame class of 2015, under the Alundra Blayze moniker. In 2015, she additionally served as the commissioner of Japanese promotion World Wonder Ring Stardom.

Miceli is a former monster truck driver, and second longest tenured female driver in the sport to Scarlet Bandit. She drove a truck named Madusa, and won the 2004 co-championship at the Monster Jam World Finals for freestyle in the first-ever three-way tie. The following year, she won the Racing Championship in the Monster Jam World Finals.

== Early life ==
Miceli was born in Minneapolis. Before entering professional wrestling, she participated in both gymnastics and track, and at age 14, she worked at an Arby's fast-food restaurant. During the beginning of her wrestling career, she also worked as a part-time nurse.

== Professional wrestling career ==
=== American Wrestling Association (1986–1989) ===
In 1984, Miceli trained with Eddie Sharkey in Minneapolis and began working on the independent circuit for $5 a match. In 1986, she started wrestling in the American Wrestling Association (AWA) feuding with Sherri Martel as Madusa Miceli. After Martel left the AWA, she replaced her as "Mr. Magnificent" Kevin Kelly's manager, who often teamed with Nick Kiniski as "The Perfect Tag Team". In a tournament final, she won the AWA World Women's Championship over Candi Devine on December 27, 1987. At that time Madusa also began managing the AWA World Heavyweight Champion Curt Hennig. She later lost the title to Wendi Richter on November 26, 1988. Hennig and Madusa joined the Diamond Exchange, a stable led by Diamond Dallas Page that included Badd Company. With Badd Company she faced the team of the Top Guns (Ricky Rice and Derrick Dukes) and Wendi Richter at the only AWA pay-per-view SuperClash III. Both Badd Company's Tag-Team Title and Wendi Richter's AWA World Women's Championship were on the line, but since Richter pinned Miceli, Badd Company remained the champions. In 1988, Miceli was also the first woman to be awarded Pro Wrestling Illustrated's Rookie of the Year.

=== All Japan Women's Pro Wrestling (1989–1991) ===
Miceli wrestled a six-week tour for All Japan Women's Pro-Wrestling at the beginning of 1989, where she won the IWA Women's title from Chigusa Nagayo before dropping it back to her the very next day. She then began training in Japan, learning the Japanese wrestling style, as well as Muay Thai, kickboxing, and boxing. She eventually signed a three-year deal with All Japan, which made her the first non-Japanese wrestler to do so. In addition, she worked for the TWA, feuding with Luna Vachon, whom she faced in a Hair vs Hair Mixed Tag Team match in September 1991. Miceli and her partner Eddie Gilbert defeated Vachon and Cactus Jack, which resulted in Vachon having her head shaved.

=== World Championship Wrestling (1991–1993) ===
She then went to WCW and helped Paul E. Dangerously form his Dangerous Alliance. She acted primarily as Alliance member Rick Rude's valet. On October 25, Dangerously kicked her out of the Dangerous Alliance at Halloween Havoc. She, however, defeated him by count-out on November 18, 1992, at Clash of the Champions XXI.

=== World Wrestling Federation (1993–1995) ===
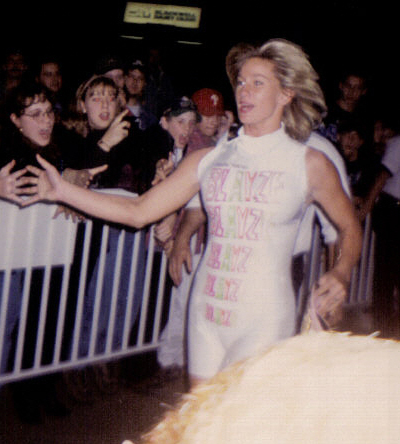
Miceli as Alundra Blayze in 1995

In 1993, the WWF reinstated its Women's Championship, a title that had been vacant since 1990, and Miceli was brought in by the company to revive the women's division. She debuted under the ring name Alundra Blayze, because WWF owner Vince McMahon did not want to pay Miceli to use the name Madusa, which she had trademarked. She wrestled in a six-woman tournament to crown a new Women's Champion, and in the finals, she pinned Heidi Lee Morgan on December 13 to win the title. After the tournament, Miceli asked WWF management to bring in new women for her to wrestle. At WrestleMania X, Blayze successfully defended the title against former WWF Women's Champion Leilani Kai. In mid-1994, Bull Nakano joined the WWF roster and began feuding with Blayze. Blayze defeated Nakano at SummerSlam, but lost the belt to her on November 20, 1994, in Japan at the Big Egg Wrestling Universe event. Five months later on April 3, 1995, Blayze regained the title from Nakano on an edition of Monday Night Raw. As part of the storyline, immediately following the win, she was attacked by Bertha Faye, who broke her nose. According to Rhonda Sing (Faye), the storyline was written so Miceli could take time off to get breast implants and a nose job. She returned to the ring in August 1995, losing the Women's Championship to Faye at SummerSlam on August 27. Two months later, she won the title a third time, defeating Faye on October 23. In December, due to financial troubles the WWF was having at the time she was released from her contract and was stripped of the title following her jump to rival company World Championship Wrestling, and the WWF Women's Championship remained vacant until 1998. Miceli was blacklisted by the WWF for the next 20 years, owing to her participation in a controversial incident upon returning to WCW during which she dropped the WWF Women's championship belt into a trash can.

=== Return to WCW (1995–2001) ===
In December 1995, Miceli signed with WCW, and as part of a storyline by booker Eric Bischoff, showed up on WCW Monday Nitro on December 18, where she threw the WWF Women's belt into a trash can. She later admitted that she regretted the action and would not have done it had Bischoff not coerced her. Miceli immediately began using the Madusa name again. Upon her debut she attacked Sherri Martel during her wedding to Col. Robert Parker. She had a match the following Monday on Nitro against Sherri Martel which she lost. After that, the company brought in Bull Nakano to feud with her; they battled in a match at Hog Wild in August 1996. Due to pre-match stipulations, Madusa was allowed to destroy Nakano's motorcycle after the match.

The company then decided to establish the WCW Women's Championship, but Madusa lost to Akira Hokuto in the finals of the tournament to crown the first champion on December 29 at Starrcade. On June 15, Hokuto retained the title against Madusa at The Great American Bash in a Title vs. Career match. Madusa then took a nearly two-year hiatus from the company.

Madusa returned to WCW in April 1999 as part of Randy Savage's faction Team Madness with Gorgeous George and Miss Madness. After that storyline ended, Madusa entered into a tournament for the WCW Championship, but she was defeated and eliminated from the tournament. She was later re-entered into the tournament in a match against Evan Karagias, but was eliminated the next week. After her elimination, Madusa put all her focus on managing Karagias. After Karagias won the WCW World Cruiserweight Championship at Mayhem, he was found flirting with Spice of the Nitro Girls. At Starrcade, however, Spice gave Karagias a low blow during the match, and Madusa pinned him to become the first female ever to win the WCW World Cruiserweight Championship. Spice then aligned herself with Madusa and became her manager for a short time.

In January 2000, Madusa developed a rivalry with Oklahoma. In a farcical Evening Gown match on an episode of WCW Thunder on January 12, Madusa defeated Oklahoma by stripping off his dress, but he attacked her after the match. She eventually lost the Cruiserweight belt to Oklahoma at Souled Out on January 16, 2000.

In the meantime, Miceli became an instructor at the WCW Power Plant, where she helped train women such as Nora Greenwald (Molly Holly) to wrestle. Before WCW's collapse, she engaged in a brief feud with Torrie Wilson and Shane Douglas, who defeated her and partner Billy Kidman at Fall Brawl in a Mixed Tag Team Scaffold match. Madusa took a big bump during this match and wasn't seen again on WCW TV. She left the company when she heard that Vince McMahon, the owner of the World Wrestling Federation, was going to buy WCW. Because she had a previous falling-out with McMahon, she opted not to stay with the company. She retired from professional wrestling for good in 2001 because she did not like the direction in which women's wrestling was going; according to her, it was becoming less about real wrestling and more about Bra and Panties matches.

=== Late career and WWE Hall of Fame (2001–present) ===
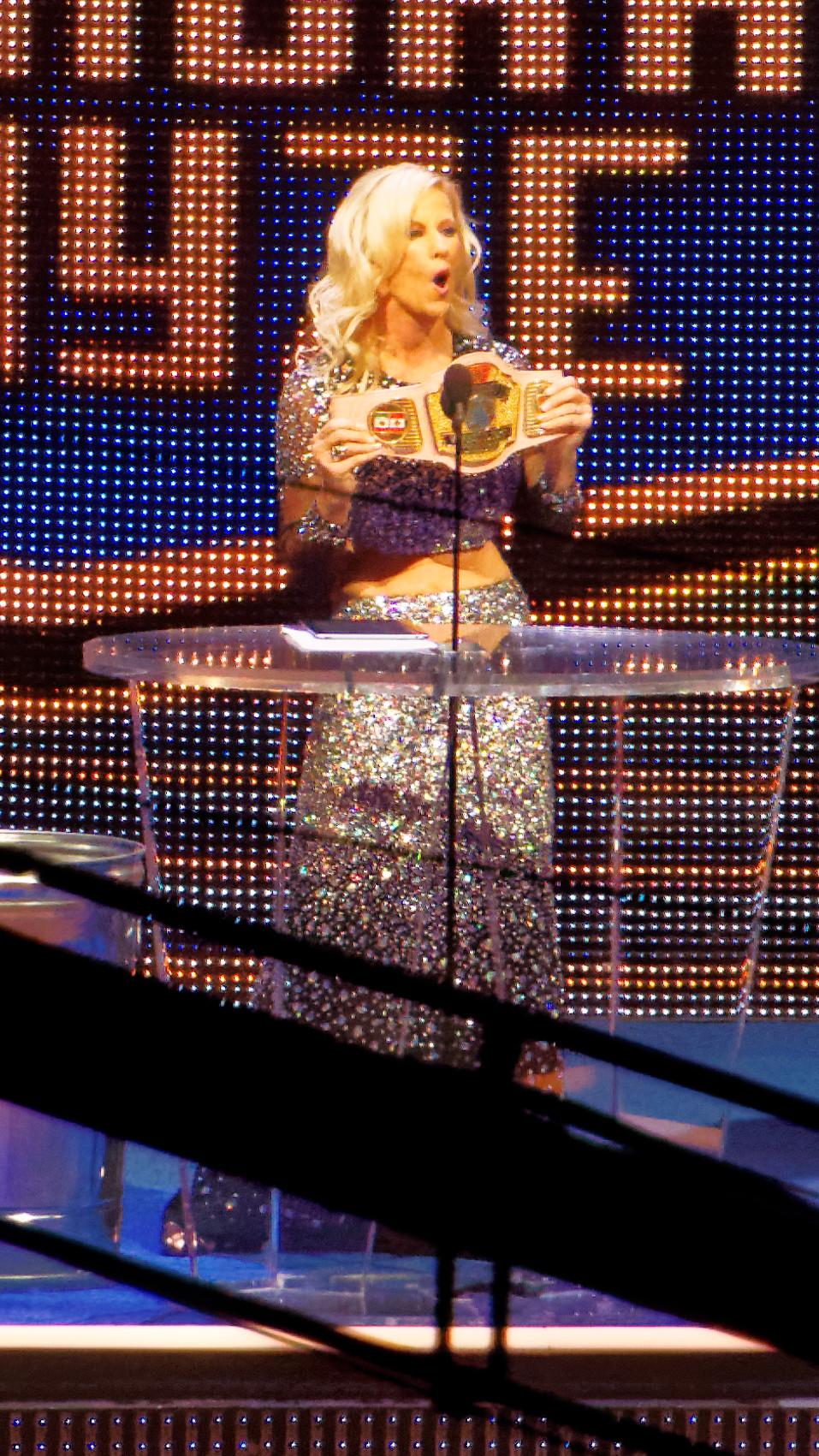
Miceli during her induction into the WWE Hall of Fame in 2015.

On March 2, 2015, it was announced that Miceli would be inducted into the WWE Hall of Fame class of 2015, under her Alundra Blayze moniker. On Twitter, she said this was a sign of respect, since that was her name in WWE, but "that bitch Madusa will be on stage speaking." During her speech, in response to constant questions about her dumping the WWF Women's Championship belt in the trash on Monday Nitro, her inductor, Natalya, wheeled a trash can onstage. Miceli (calling herself both Madusa and Alundra Blayze) withdrew the belt, which she stressed was a good-looking "women's wrestling belt", and said it was finally "back home where it belongs" after 20 years. She held the belt on her shoulder, and referred to herself as the reigning WWF Women's Champion. Following her Hall of Fame induction, she made a special appearance during the WrestleMania 31 event the following day on March 29, along with the other Hall of Fame inductees.

In September 2015, Miceli was appointed the commissioner of Japanese women's promotion World Wonder Ring Stardom.

On January 27, 2016, Miceli appeared on WWE Network's program Table for 3, along with fellow wrestlers Ivory and Molly Holly.

In September 2017, the WWE Network released a documentary entitled "TrailBlayzer" detailing Miceli's careers in both wrestling and monster truck driving.

Miceli as Alundra Blayze was announced as an entrant into the battle royal for a women's championship opportunity at WWE Evolution, marking a return to the ring after an 18-year hiatus, however she was eliminated by Nia Jax

On July 22, 2019, Alundra Blayze appeared as a heel and attacked 24/7 Champion Candice Michelle, after which she captured the title from Candice by forcing her to submit, with Melina acting as the official, becoming the third woman to win the title, while also becoming the first individual to win the title via submission. She also became the second woman to hold both the WWE Women's Championship, and the 24/7 Championship. She later attempted to toss the 24/7 Championship into the trash (similar to when she did the same to the WWF Women's Championship in 1995), only to instead sell the title to WWE Hall of Famer Ted DiBiase.

Returning to TNT for the first time in 20 years, Miceli was presenter of the All Elite Wrestling (AEW)'s Women's Tag Team Cup Tournament: The Deadly Draw, which began on August 3, 2020. The tournament concluded on the August 22, 2020, Saturday episode of AEW Dynamite, where she gave the championship cup to the tournament winners Ivelisse and Diamante.

Miceli would also appear in WWE on the July 26, 2022, episode of NXT in a backstage segment with Roxanne Perez and McKenzie Mitchell, announcing a fatal four-way elimination match for the vacant NXT Women's Tag Team Championship.

On January 23, 2023, Miceli appeared backstage during Raw is XXX, celebrating the 30th anniversary of Monday Night Raw.

Miceli inducted Bull Nakano into the WWE Hall of Fame class of 2024.

=== National Wrestling Alliance (2019–present) ===
On April 27, 2019, at the Crockett Cup Miceli appeared for the National Wrestling Alliance (NWA) as Madusa, where she presented the vacant NWA Women's Championship before Allysin Kay and Santana Garrett competed for it. She would later accompany The Wild Cards (Royce Isaacs and Thomas Latimer) who challenged the Villain Enterprises (Brody King and PCO) at the Crockett Cup finals for the vacant NWA World Tag Team Championship, but were unsuccessful. Madusa would later become a producer in NWA.

== Monster truck career ==
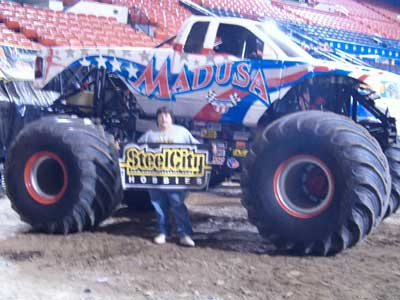
Miceli's monster truck in 2006

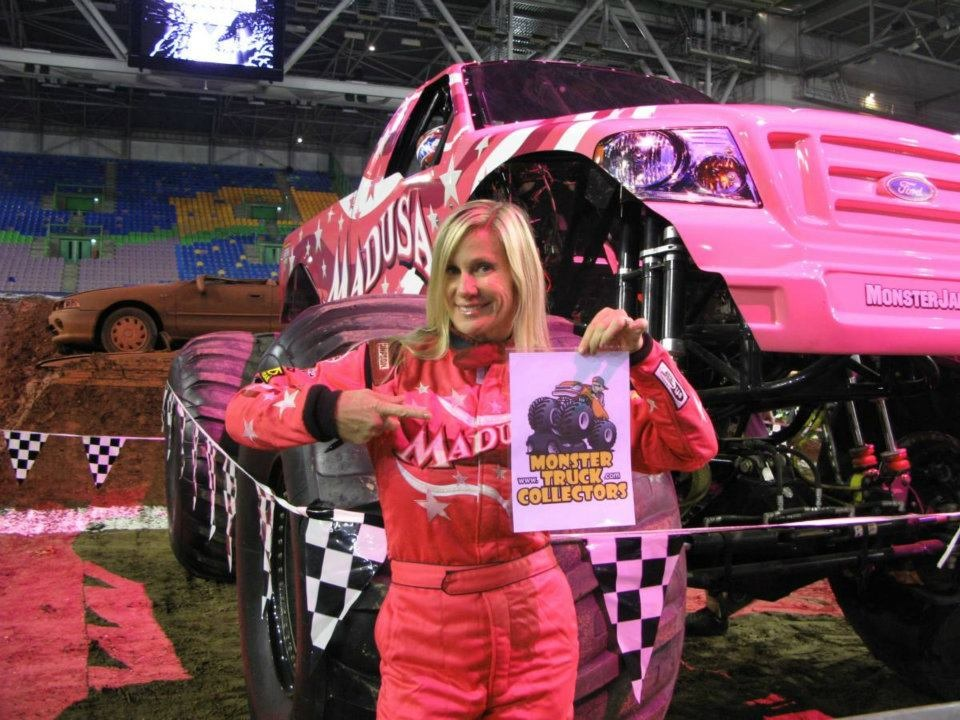
Miceli with her monster truck, "Madusa" in 2011

Miceli entered the monster truck business under Dennis Anderson in 1999. She made her first American hot rod appearance at the Trans World Dome. Afterward, she purchased her own truck and named it Madusa, as she still held the rights to the name. She began winning freestyle competitions in 2001. Miceli won the 2004 co-championship at the Monster Jam World Finals for freestyle in the only-ever three-way tie, as Monster Jam would institute tiebreaking rules following that year's World Finals. In March 2005 in Las Vegas, she beat her trainer Dennis Anderson in the final bracket of the Monster Jam World Finals for the Racing Championship, thus making her the first woman to win the Monster Jam World Finals racing championship. Also in 2005, she was the only female competitor in the Super Bowl of Motorsports.

As of January 2008, she is also the Executive Vice President of the Major League of Monster Trucks. In 2009, she returned to Monster Jam for the first time since 2006.

On October 10, 2014, she was injured in a Monster Jam event in Melbourne, Australia, and was taken to a Melbourne hospital for treatment.

== Other media ==
She appeared in the video games WCW Nitro, WCW Backstage Assault, WWE 2K16, WWE 2K17, WWE 2K18, WWE 2K19, WWE 2K25 and WWE 2K26.

== Personal life ==
After a brief first marriage to Eddie Gilbert in 1990, Miceli's second marriage was on February 14, 1998, to NFL player Ken Blackman, eight months after they met in June 1997. They shared homes in Cincinnati and Homosassa, Florida. In 1998, they opened a motorcycle shop called Spookee Custom Cycles, which made motorcycles for other NFL players such as Kimo von Oelhoffen, Darnay Scott, Bradford Banta, and Dan Wilkinson. The couple later divorced in 2008.

On June 25, 2011, Miceli married Alan Jonason, a sergeant major in the U.S. Army, in Memphis. The wedding took place at Graceland and was broadcast over the internet for over 22,000 fans.

In 1995, she appeared in the films Shootfighter II, Death Match, and Intersanction II. In Japan, she released a CD of songs sung in Japanese entitled Who's Madusa. She owns a grooming, pet spa, and doggy bakery called Koolkats and Hotdogs in Lecanto, Florida. In February 2004, she provided commentary for boat races.

== Championships and accomplishments ==
=== Professional wrestling ===
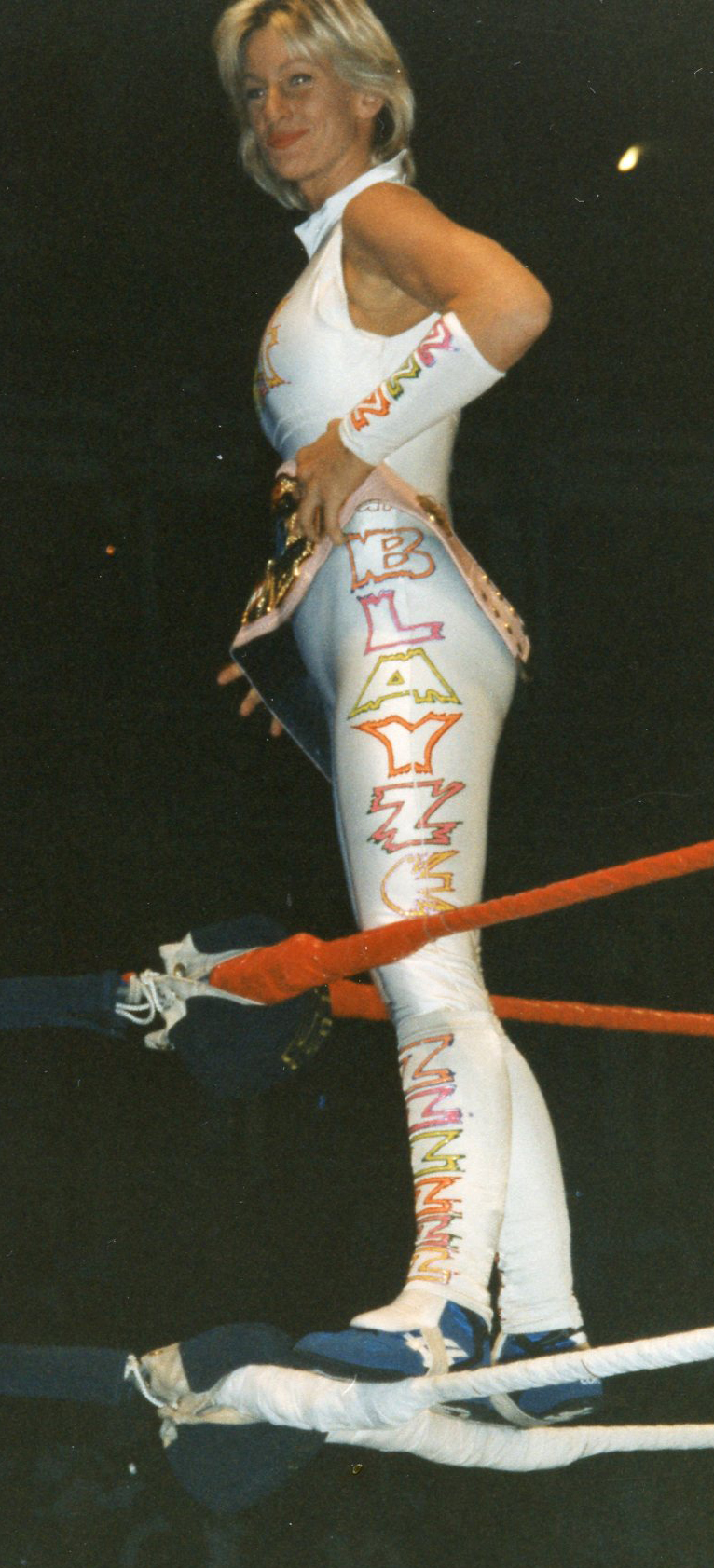
Miceli is a three-time WWF Women's Champion

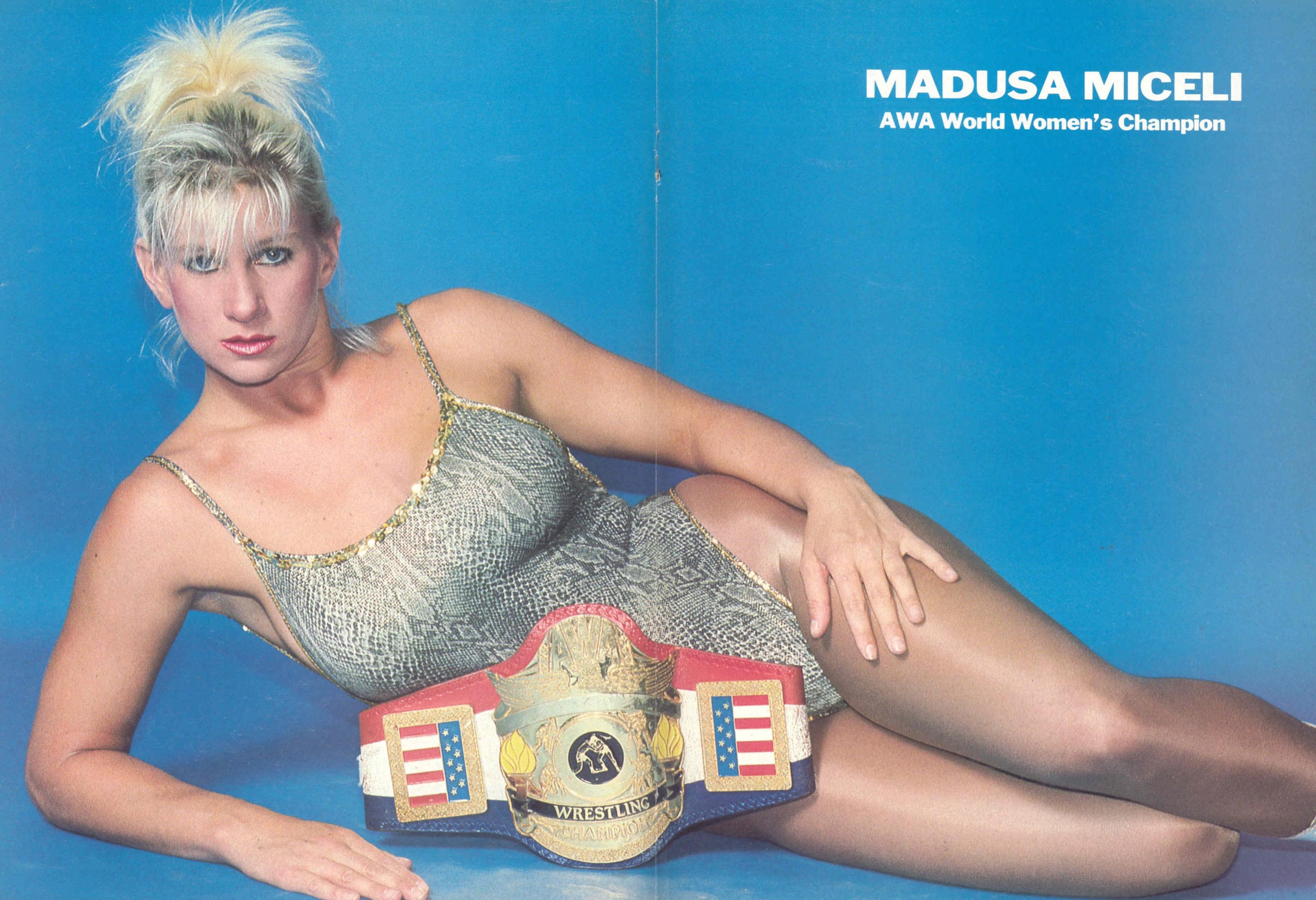
Madusa Miceli as the AWA World Women's Champion, circa 1988

- All Japan Women's Pro-Wrestling
  - IWA World Women's Championship (2 times)
  - Tag League the Best (1989) – with Mitsuko Nishiwaki
- American Wrestling Association
  - AWA World Women's Championship (1 time)
- Cauliflower Alley Club
  - Iron Mike Mazurki Award (2020)
- George Tragos/Lou Thesz Professional Wrestling Hall of Fame
  - Lou Thesz Award 2025
- International World Class Championship Wrestling
  - IWCCW Women's Championship (1 time)
- Pro Wrestling Illustrated
  - Rookie of the Year (1988)
  - Stanley Weston Award (2020)
- Women's Wrestling Hall of Fame
  - Class of 2023
- World Championship Wrestling
  - WCW Cruiserweight Championship (1 time)
- World Wrestling Federation/WWE
  - WWF Women's Championship (3 times)
  - WWE 24/7 Championship (1 time)
  - WWE Hall of Fame (Class of 2015)

=== Motorsports ===
- United States Hot Rod Association

(All titles where won where as driver of the Madusa Monster Truck)

  - USHRA Monster Jam World Finals Freestyle Co-Championship (2004) (shared with Lupe Soza (El Toro Loco) and Tom Meents (Maximum Destruction))
  - USHRA Monster Jam World Finals Racing Championship (2005)
