= WLW Ladies Championship =

Professional wrestling women's championship

NWA WLW Ladies Championship

Details
- Promotion: World League Wrestling
- Date established: April 1 1999
- Current champion(s): Skyler Sparks
- Date won: November 2, 2024

Other name(s)
- WLW Ladies Championship (1999-2024); NWA WLW Ladies Championship (2024-present)
Statistics
- First champion(s): Malia Hosaka
- Most reigns: Miss Natural / Heather Patera and Stacey O'Brien (8)
- Longest reign: Lucy Mendez (728 days)
- Shortest reign: Katie Syren and Lucy Mendez (1 day)

The World League Wrestling (WLW) Ladies Championship, is the top title contested for women's wrestlers in the independent professional wrestling promotion NWA World League Wrestling.

There have been 43 reigns among 16 wrestlers with five vacancies. The inaugural champion was Malia Hosaka. Miss Natural / Heather Petera and Stacey O'Brien have the most reigns at eight. Stacey O'Brien has the longest combined reign at 1,650 days. Lucy Mendez has the longest singular reign at 728 days. Katie Syren and Mendez have the shortest singular reigns at one day.

The current champion is Skyler Sparks. She defeated Tootie Lynn in a no disqualification match at NWA WLW XXV - 25th Anniversary on November 2, 2024.

== Title history ==
As of March 20, 2025.

=== Names ===
Name	Time of use
WLW Ladies Championship	April 1, 1999 – November 2, 2024
NWA WLW Ladies Championship	November 2, 2024 – present

=== Reigns ===
Key
No.	Overall reign number
Reign	Reign number for the specific champion
Days	Number of days held
<1	Reign lasted less than a day
+	Current reign is changing daily

No.	Champion	Championship change			Reign statistics		Notes	Ref.
No.	Champion	Date	Event	Location	Reign	Days	Notes	Ref.
1	Malia Hosaka	April 1, 1999	House show	Springfield, Missouri	1	17	Records are unclear as to who Hosaka defeated to become the inaugural champion.	
2	Brandi Alexander	April 18, 1999	House show	Springfield, Missouri	1	184		
3	Malia Hosaka	October 19, 1999	House show	Eldon, Missouri	2	(Note: The exact length of Hoska's second reign is unknown. It may have lasted between 471 and 498 days.)		
—	Vacated	N/A	—	—	—	—	Title was vacated for undocumented reasons.	
4	Heather Savage	April 27, 2001	House show	Buffalo, Missouri	1	4	Savage defeated Che Physique in a tournament finals to win the vacant title.	
5	Che Physique	May 1, 2001	House show	Forsyth, Missouri	1	92		
6	Heather Savage	August 1, 2001	House show	Springfield, Missouri	2	199		
7	Miss Natural	February 16, 2002	House show	Eldon, Missouri	1	20		
8	Wendy Rimmer	March 8, 2002	House show	Lexington, Missouri	1	640		
9	Miss Natural	December 8, 2003	House show	Lexington, Missouri	2	137		
10	Helena Heavenly	April 23, 2004	House show	Richmond, Missouri	1	113		
11	Miss Natural	August 14, 2004	House show	Richmond, Missouri	3	91		
12	Josie	November 13, 2004	House show	Kansas City, Missouri	1	147		
13	Miss Natural	April 9, 2005	House show	Concordia, Missouri	4	(Note: The exact length of Miss Natural's fourth reign is unknown. It may have lasted between 58 and 69 days.)		
—	Vacated	N/A	—	—	—	—	Title was vacated for undocumented reasons.	
14	Josie	November 12, 2005	House show	Eldon, Missouri	2	(Note: The exact length of Josie's second reign is unknown. It may have lasted between 384 and 392 days.)	Josie defeated Wonderful Wendy to win the vacant title.	
—	Vacated	N/A	—	—	—	—	Title was vacated for undocumented reasons.	
15	Christie Summers	December 9, 2006	House shows	St. Louis, Missouri	1	286	Summers defeated Rebecca Raze and Jennifer Starr in a three-way match.	
16	Katie Syren	September 21, 2007	House show	Eldon, Missouri	1	1	This was a three-way match that also included Miss Natural.	
17	Christie Summers	September 22, 2007	House show	Sedalia, Missouri	2	35		
18	Katie Syren	October 27, 2007	House show	Maryland Heights, Missouri	2	21		
19	Miss Natural	November 17, 2007	House show	Concordia, Missouri	5	160		
20	Stacey O'Brien	April 25, 2008	House show	Lebanon, Missouri	1	182		
21	Amy Hennig	October 24, 2008	House show	Warsaw, Missouri	1	29		
22	Stacey O'Brien	November 22, 2008	House show	St. Louis, Missouri	2	119		
23	Amy Hennig	March 21, 2009	House show	Eldon, Missouri	2	196		
24	Becca Swanson	October 3, 2009	House show	Eldon, Missouri	1	160		
25	Lucy Mendez	March 12, 2010	House show	Spokane, Missouri	1	1	Lucy Mendez defeated Amy Hennig and Becca Swanson in a three-way match.	
26	Amy Hennig	March 13, 2010	House show	Summersville, Missouri	3	399	Amy Hennig defeated Lucy Mendez and Becca Swanson in a three-way match.	
—	Vacated	April 16, 2011	–	–	—	—	Hennig was strip of the title due to a lack of defenses.	
27	Stacey O'Brien	September 18, 2011	House show	Burlington, Iowa	3	12	O'Brien defeated Lucy Mendez to win the vacant title.	
28	Lucy Mendez	September 30, 2011	House show	Dodge City, Kansas	2	133	Lucy Mendez teamed up with Brian Breaker against Jack Gamble and Stacey O'Brien in a tag team match with the WLW Heavyweight Championship on the line as well. Mendez pinned O'Brien to win the match and the Ladies Championship.	
—	Vacated	February 10, 2012	—	—	—	—	Mendez was stripped of the title due to a lack of defenses.	
29	Stacey O'Brien	February 10, 2012	House show	Richmond, Missouri	4	434	Stacey O'Brien defeated Miss Natural to win the vacant title.	
30	Miss Natural	April 19, 2013	House show	Troy, Missouri	6	8	This was a 2 out of 3 falls match.	
31	Stacey O'Brien	April 27, 2013	House show	Camdenton, Missouri	5	281	Stacey O'Brien defeated Miss Natural to win the vacant title.	
32	Devyn Nicole	March 14, 2014	House show	Otterville, Missouri	1	118		
33	Heather Patera	July 10, 2014	House show	Troy, Missouri	7	135		
34	Stacey O'Brien	November 22, 2014	House show	Jefferson City, Missouri	6	280		
35	Heather Patera	August 29, 2015	House show	Troy, Missouri	8	364		
36	Monica Passeri	August 27, 2016	House show	St. Peters, Missouri	1	14	This was a three-way match that also included Stacey O'Brien	
37	Stacey O'Brien	September 10, 2016	House show	Grain Valley, Missouri	7	21		
38	Lucy Mendez	October 1, 2016	House show	Troy, Missouri	3	322		
39	Monica Passeri	August 19, 2017	House show	Richmond, Missouri	2	259		
40	Stacey O'Brien	May 5, 2018	House show	Troy, Missouri	8	308		
41	Lucy Mendez	March 9, 2019	House show	Moscow Mills, Missouri	4	728		
—	Deactivated	March 6, 2021	—	—	—	—	Leland Race stated the title was deactivated.	
42	Tootie Lynn	February 10, 2024	New Years Wrestleution	Troy, Missouri	1	266	Lynn defeated Skylar Sparks for the reactivated title. It was also announced that World League Wrestling would be joining the NWA thus the title became known as the NWA WLW Ladies Championship.	
43	Skylar Sparks	November 2, 2024	NWA WLW XXV - 25th Anniversary	Troy, Missouri	1	138+	This was a no disqualification match.	

== Combined reigns ==
†	Indicates the current champion
¤	The exact length of at least one title reign is uncertain; so the shortest possible length is used.

As of March 20, 2025.

Rank	Wrestler	# of Reigns	Combined Days
1	Stacey O'Brien	8	1,650
1	Miss Natural / Heather Patera	8	1,338¤
2	Wendy Rimmer	1	640
3	Amy Hennig	3	622
4	Josie	2	539¤
5	Christie Summers	2	321
6	Monica Passeri	2	273
7	Tootie Lynn	1	266
8	Heather Savage	2	203
9	Brandi Alexander	1	184
10	Becca Swanson	1	160
11	Skylar Sparks†	1	138+
12	Lucy Mendes	2	133
13	Helena Heavenly	1	113¤
14	Che Physique	1	92
15	Malia Hosaka	2	91¤
16	Katie Syren	1	22

== See also ==
- Harley Race's Wrestling Academy
