= Becca Swanson =

American powerlifter, strongwoman and professional wrestler

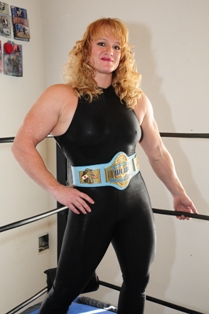

Personal information
- Born: 20 November 1973 (age 52) Papillion, Nebraska, U.S.
- Occupations: Powerlifter, strongwoman, professional wrestler, bodybuilder
- Height: 5 ft 10 in (178 cm)
- Weight: 89.4–117 kg (197–258 lb)
- Website: beccaswanson.com
Medal record
Powerlifting
Representing United States
1st	1996 Omaha Open
1st	1998 Omaha Open
1st	1999 Omaha Open
1st	2000 Omaha Open
1st	2001 Nebraska/Midwest
1st	2001 APF Senior Nationals
1st	2001 APF Big Iron Open
1st	2001 WPC World Championships
1st	2002 APF Senior Nationals
1st	2003 WPC WPO Finals
1st	2003 APF Senior Nationals
1st	2003 WPC World Championships
1st	2004 WPC Super Open
1st	2004 APF NE/IA State Midwest
Disqualified	2005 WPC WPO Super Open
2nd	2005 WPO WR Bench Bash
1st	2005 APF Nationals
1st	2005 APF Chicago Summerbash
1st	2005 WPC WPO Semifinals
1st	2005 WPO European Semifinals
1st	2005 WPC WPO Finals
1st	2006 Police/Fire BP Exhibition
1st	2007 UPA Bench Bash For Cash
1st	2007 Rick Hussey Benefit Meet
1st	2008 Big Iron In-House Open

Becca Swanson
Professional wrestling career
- Ring name: Becca Swanson
- Billed height: 5 ft 10 in (178 cm)
- Billed weight: 105 kg (231 lb)
- Trained by: Harley Race; Harley Race's Wrestling Academy; World League Wrestling
- Debut: 2009
- Retired: 2010

Rebecca 'Becca' Swanson (born November 20, 1973) is an American powerlifter, strongwoman and former professional wrestler. She broke multiple women’s powerlifting world records, including the heaviest squat, bench press, deadlift and total. Due to her many accomplishments including unbeaten strength world records to-date, she is regarded as "the strongest woman to have ever lived".

== Early life ==
Swanson was born November 20, 1973, in Papillion, Nebraska. She graduated from the University of Nebraska–Lincoln in 1998 with a Bachelor of Science in Mechanical Engineering.

== Bodybuilding, powerlifting, and strongwoman ==
Becca Swanson started out in 1996 with the desire to be a bodybuilder, but ended up powerlifting. According to her, the larger and more muscular women had fallen out of favor in bodybuilding after a few shows. She was told that she was just too big for bodybuilding, which motivated her to take up powerlifting. At the same time, she was very close to some powerlifting world records and thought it best to focus her efforts there. Her squat is 601.9 pounds (273.0 kg) (equipped), bench press is 523.6 pounds (237.5 kg) (equipped with bench shirt), and she is the only woman to deadlift 621 pounds (282 kg) (equipped). She is also the first woman ever known to be a member of the 2,000 pound club, as she is the first of two women ever to total over 2,000 pounds in a meet on the same day. She has also competed in strongwoman contests, beginning in 2002. Swanson is also known for doing 35 kg dumbbell curls for 10 repetitions.

== Professional wrestling ==
=== Harley Race's Wrestling Academy/World League Wrestling (2009–2010) ===
Swanson was a professional wrestler in Harley Race's World League Wrestling based in Eldon, Missouri.

Swanson (as a heel) won the WLW Ladies Championship from Amy Hennig on October 3, 2009, at the WLW Tenth Anniversary Show. On March 12, 2010, Swanson would lose the title to Lucy Mendez in a triple threat match which also included Hennig. On March 13, Swanson was unsuccessful in capturing the WLW Women's Championship for a second time as Hennig would defeat both Swanson and Mendez in a triple threat match.

== WPC/APF/WPO world records (equipped) ==
- 198+ Weight Class – 854.3 lb (387.5 kg) Squat
- 198+ Weight Class – 600.8 lb (272.5 kg) Bench
- 198+ Weight Class – 694.4 lb (315.0 kg) Deadlift
- 198+ Weight Class – 2,050 lb (930 kg) Total (854.3/387.5, 600.8/272.5, 683.4/310.0) (best lifts in one meet)
- 198 lb (90 kg) Weight Class – 804 lb (365 kg) Squat
- 198 lb (90 kg) Weight Class – 480 lb (220 kg) Bench
- 198 lb (90 kg) Weight Class – 600 lb (270 kg) Deadlift
- 198 lb (90 kg) Weight Class – 1,884 lb (855 kg) Total

== Championships and accomplishments ==
=== Bodybuilding ===
- Ms. Midwest (1 time)
- Ms. Nebraska (1 time)
- Ms. Rocky Mountain (1 time)

=== Powerlifting ===
- World Powerlifting Congress
  - 90 kg Class
    - 710.5 kg Total (June 14, 2002)
  - 90+ kg Class
    - 377.5 kg Squat (June 4, 2005)
    - 272.5 kg Bench press (June 4, 2005)
    - 290.5 kg Deadlift (June 4, 2005)
    - 873 kg Total (June 4, 2005)

=== Professional wrestling ===
- World League Wrestling
  - WLW Ladies Championship (1 time)

== Physical statistics ==
- Height: 5 ft 10 in (178 cm)
- Weight: 110 kg (240 lb)
- Quads: 27 in (69 cm)
- Calves: 17.5 in (44 cm)
- Shoulders: 54 in (140 cm)
- Biceps: 19 in (48 cm)
