= Brandi Alexander =

American professional wrestler

Personal information
- Born: March 1, 1974 (age 52) Fayetteville, West Virginia, U.S.

Professional wrestling career
- Ring name: Brandi Alexander
- Billed height: 5 ft 7 in (1.70 m)
- Billed weight: 135 lb (61 kg)
- Trained by: Larry Sharpe; Thrasher
- Debut: 1993
- Retired: 2003

Brandi Alexander (born March 1, 1974) is an American professional wrestler. During her career, she has wrestled in many wrestling federations, such as World Wrestling Entertainment (WWE), World Championship Wrestling (WCW), National Wrestling Alliance (NWA), American Wrestling Association (AWA), World League Wrestling (WLW), Professional Girl Wrestling Association (PGWA), World Wrestling Council (WWC), Carolina Wrestling Federation (CWF), FWA, and LAW.

== Early life ==
In her youth, Alexander enjoyed wrestling and was a fan of Sherri Martel. After meeting Tony Altomare, a former tag team partner of Lou Albano, Alexander looked into training at The Fabulous Moolah's school in South Carolina. Because she was reluctant to move to a new state, Alexander began her wrestling training at the Monster Factory under Larry Sharpe and Glenn Ruth.

== Professional wrestling career ==
Alexander began her wrestling career in 1993.

On February 27, 1998, Alexander was defeated by Brittany Brown, the latter retaining her NWA New Jersey Championship at the Third Annual Eddie Gilbert Memorial Brawl at the Airport Radisson Hotel in Philadelphia, Pennsylvania. The Fabulous Moolah was in Brown's corner while Fred The Elephant Boy from The Howard Stern Show was at ringside with Alexander.

Alexander worked two matches for World Championship Wrestling in 1999. She considers one of her biggest wins to be defeating Miss Madness on an episode of WCW Thunder. Miss Madness, however, won their rematch the following week. Also in 1999, she appeared at World Wrestling Council's annual event WWC Anniversary, defeating Malia Hosaka in a singles match.

In mid-2003, Alexander won the Carolina Wrestling Federation's Women's Championship from Amber Holly.

== Championships and accomplishments ==
- Appalachian Pro Wrestling
  - APW Cruiserweight Champion (1 time)
- Canadian Wrestling Alliance
  - CWA Women's Championship (1 time)
- Carolina Wrestling Federation
  - CWF Women's Championship (1 time)
- Continental Wrestling Alliance
  - CWA Continental Women's Championship (1 time)
- Frontier Wrestling Alliance
  - FWA Women's Championship (1 time)
- Independent Wrestling Council
  - IWC Women's Championship (1 time)
- Ladies All-Pro Wrestling
  - LAW International Television Championship (1 time)
- New England Wrestling
  - NEW Women's Championship (1 time)
- Southern States Wrestling
  - SSW Women's Championship (2 times)
- Ultimate Championship Wrestling
  - UCW Women's Championship (1 time)
- World League Wrestling
  - WLW Ladies Championship (1 time)
- World Wide Wrestling Alliance
  - WWWA Woman's Championship (2 times)
