= Glossary of professional wrestling terms =

Professional wrestling has accrued a considerable amount of jargon throughout its existence. Much of it stems from the industry's origins in the days of carnivals and circuses. In the past, professional wrestlers used such terms in the presence of fans so as not to reveal the worked nature of the business. Into the 21st century, widespread discussion on the Internet has popularized these terms. Many of the terms refer to the financial aspects of professional wrestling in addition to in-ring terms.

== A ==
A-show
A wrestling event where a company's biggest draws wrestle. Compare B-show and C-show.
A-team
A group of a wrestling promotion's top stars who wrestle at an A-show. Compare B-team.
abort
To suddenly discontinue a feud, angle, or gimmick due to a lack of fan interest or some other caveat (like injury), usually without explanation.
ace
A term typically used in Japanese puroresu for a wrestler designated as the face of the promotion. Not necessarily the same as the top champion. Examples of aces include Hiroshi Tanahashi in New Japan Pro Wrestling, Kento Miyahara and Mitsuharu Misawa in All Japan Pro Wrestling, Hayabusa in Frontier Martial-Arts Wrestling, Kaito Kiyomiya and Naomichi Marufuji in Pro Wrestling Noah, and Mayu Iwatani in World Wonder Ring Stardom.
airport test
A phrase often attributed to Vince McMahon. It is a hypothetical test that questions whether a wrestler would be noticed walking through the airport by the general public. The test theoretically determines whether the wrestler has a marketable appearance or not. See also name test.
agent

A management employee, often a former wrestler though it can be a current wrestler or even a non-wrestler, who helps wrestlers set up matches and plan storylines, gives feedback on matches, and relays instructions from the bookers. Agents often act as a liaison between wrestlers and higher-level management and sometimes may also help in training younger wrestlers. They are referred to by WWE as "producers" and by AEW as "coaches".
alliance
A cooperative relationship developed between two or more wrestlers, whether wrestling as a tag team or in individual matches. An alliance is different from (but can eventually develop into) a stable or a faction, as wrestlers in an alliance are not packaged together but presented as a group of individuals working together for a common short-term goal. Alliances are often formed for the specific purpose of retaining titles between the members of the alliance, or to counter a specific foe or group of foes. The formation of an alliance can be a storyline of its own.
Andre shot
A camera trick by which a wrestler is made to appear larger by placing the camera below the wrestler and shooting upward. Named for André the Giant, a frequent subject of such camera shots.
angle
A storyline. An angle usually begins when one wrestler attacks another (physically or verbally), which results in revenge. An angle may be as small as a single match or a vendetta that lasts for years. It is not uncommon to see an angle become retconned due to it not getting over with the fans, or if one of the wrestlers currently involved in the angle is fired.
Apter mag
An old-style professional wrestling magazine that sticks to kayfabe articles. The term refers to the magazines at one time connected to journalist Bill Apter, such as Pro Wrestling Illustrated.
audible
A message delivered from backstage, either to the referee (using their earpiece) or the commentary team (using their headsets) instructing the wrestlers and other on-screen talent on what to do, usually in order to work around a botch by changing the match on the fly.

== B ==
B-show
A wrestling event featuring the middle and lower-level talent of a wrestling promotion. Sometimes includes well-known wrestlers making a return or finishing up their career. Compare A-show and C-show.
B-team
The group of wrestlers on a B-show. Frequently, the B-team will wrestle at a venue the same night wrestlers on the A-team are wrestling in a different event, although a promotion will sometimes schedule an event with B-team wrestlers to test a new market. Compare A-team.
babyface
See face.
barnstorming
Early-20th century practice of wrestlers moving as a troupe from town-to-town to perform matches and/or con residents. Effectively supplanted by the territory system.
base
1. (noun): The standing recipient of a high-flying move, such as a headscissors takedown or crossbody.
2. (verb): The actions taken by such a recipient, especially for complex spectacular-looking maneuvers that require subtle co-operation between both parties to execute effectively. More often used in lucha libre circles. Hence the propensity for stockier luchadores to be rudos, who can more-firmly brace for the aerial techniques of lither técnicos.
beat down

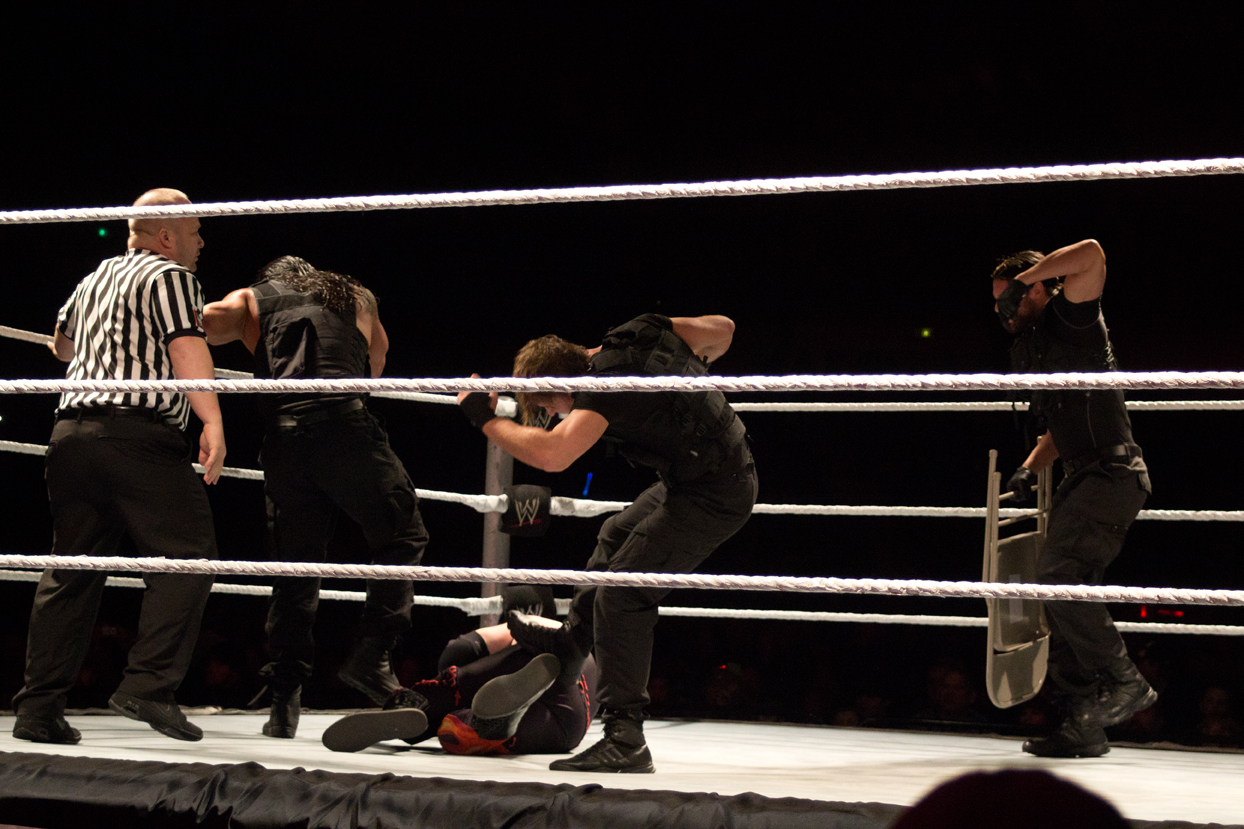
The Shield performing a beat down on Kane

An angle in which a wrestler or other performer is the recipient of a one-sided beating (sometimes with brief false comebacks), usually by a group of wrestlers or after being lured into a compromising position.
bicycling
A now-obsolete practice used in the territorial era in which television tapes were distributed to stations within a promoter's territory.
blading

A wrestler intentionally cutting themselves (or, more rarely, allowing themselves to be cut by the opponent or referee) to provoke bleeding to sell the opponent's offense.
blind tag
1. A tag made in a tag team match where the wrestler on the apron tags their partner unbeknownst to them or without their consent.
2. A tag where the tagger's opponent is unaware a tag has occurred, leaving them open to a blindside attack as they attempt to attack the wrestler who has been tagged out. Most often occurs when the partner in the ring is thrown against the ropes or backed into their own corner.
blowjob
An attractive male wrestler, used to attract groupies to events.
blown spot
See missed spot.
blow off
The final match in a feud. While the involved wrestlers often move onto new feuds, sometimes it is the final match in the promotion for one or more of the wrestlers.
blow up
To become exhausted during a match.
bonzo gonzo
An ending used in tag team and other multi-party matches in which all wrestlers are in the ring and the referee cannot restore order.
book

To determine and schedule the events of a wrestling card. The person in charge of setting up matches and writing angles is a "booker". It is the wrestling equivalent of a director. A booker can also be described as someone who recruits and hires talent to work in a particular promotion. The United States District Court for the Southern District of Iowa defined a booker in 1956 as "[...] any person who, for a fee or commission, arranges with a promoter or promoters for the performance of wrestlers in professional wrestling exhibitions". Booking is also the term a wrestler uses to describe a scheduled match or appearance on a wrestling show (i.e., "a booked match").
boom boom boom
A match segment, often near the end of tag team or multi-party matches, when competitors perform their signature moves in quick succession.
botch
Something (usually a scripted move or spoken line) which does not go as planned due to a mistake.
Bret's rope
The second rope of a wrestling ring, the middle rope, often considered the most dangerous rope. Named after wrestler Bret Hart, who frequently struck from this rope. The term was coined by Jay Hunter, and adopted by commentators such as NJPW's Chris Charlton.
broadway

A match that ends in a time limit draw. Often used to refer to the hour-long draws that a touring world champion would routinely be expected to perform as to retain their title whilst not emphatically beating the local star.
bump
To fall on the mat or ground. A flat back bump is a bump in which a wrestler lands solidly on their back with high impact, spread over as much surface as possible. A "phantom bump" occurs when a wrestler or referee takes a bump without a plausible reason (usually due to a botch or other mistake).
burial

The worked lowering (relegation) of a wrestler's status in the eyes of the fans. The opposite of a push, it is the act of a promoter or booker causing a wrestler to lose popularity, momentum and/or credibility, or damaging their gimmick through means such as forcing them to lose in squash matches, losing continuously, allowing opponents to no-sell or kick out of said wrestler's finisher, or forcing them to participate in unentertaining or degrading storylines, or not using them at all. A burial is often used as a form of punishment due to real-life backstage disagreements between the wrestler and the booker, the wrestler falling out of favor with the company, or sometimes to demote an unpopular performer or gimmick.
business
Professional wrestling; instead of "profession" or "sport".
bust open
To start to bleed, usually from the head after being hit with something like a chair, and typically (but not always) after blading.

== C ==
C-show
An event featuring the lowest level of talent in a promotion, most notably rookies and entry-level talent. Often used as a derogatory adjective. Compare A-show and B-show.
call
To instruct the other wrestler of what is going to happen in the match. Also refers to commentators detailing what is happening during a match.
call it in the ring
To make up moves and storytelling in a match on the fly, rather than rehearse them in advance. It is essentially the wrestling equivalent of improvisational theatre.
camera kills
Empty seats that are not sold due to being right behind a permanent camera location which would result in an obstructed view.
card
The lineup of the matches that will be staged at a given venue for a given performance. The card is generally performed in a roughly inverse order to the way in which it might be printed for posters or other promotional materials. The major matches between well-known opponents are said to be "top of the card" or the main event and generally go on last, while the preliminary matches between lesser-known opponents are said to be the "undercard".
carpenter
A term for a wrestler whose purpose is to use their in-ring abilities to make their opponents look as good and strong as possible. This is different from an enhancement talent in that a wrestler is used as a carpenter because they are recognized as having great in-ring abilities and experience. Often (but not always) a carpenter is an older, more experienced wrestler, tasked with making less experienced wrestlers (often in the beginning stages of receiving a push) look like a credible threat going into their next program. In modern times, a carpenter is also used when a company is preparing to present a recent signee who may not be familiar to the audience, in an effort to help the wrestler best showcase their abilities. Because of their skill and role in building up talent, carpenters are regarded with a great deal of respect.
carry
The act of one wrestler guiding a typically less experienced or skilled performer through a match. A "carry job" refers to a match or angle in which a particularly skilled performer is able to make an inferior wrestler look good or is perceived to be doing all the work.
carnie/ceazarnie
Using wrestling jargon to hide meaning from people outside the business. This can be used while calling spots in the ring in case anyone hears.
carny
A person who uses dishonesty, exploitation, or underhanded tactics to work an angle, hustle money, or protect the business.
chain wrestling
A sequence of traditional grappling moves usually employed near the start of a match. More common in Japan, the UK and Mexico than in the US. Initially popularized in the west as an Indian export.
champion's advantage

The rule that a reigning champion, should they lose during a title defense by countout or disqualification rather than by the traditional means of pinfall or submission, would retain their title despite losing the match; it can sometimes be revoked as part of a storyline.
cheap heat
The incitement of a negative crowd reaction by insulting the crowd en-masse, typically by bringing up something unrelated to the wrestling business (such as mocking a local town or sports team), usually used in a negative light. Foreign heel wrestlers, like Iron Sheik, often get this by insulting whatever country they're performing in. Compare cheap pop.
cheap pop
The incitement of a positive crowd reaction by "kissing up" to the crowd. Mick Foley would often do this by saying "It's great to be here in (insert name of city and state)!" While The Rock would begin many promos by saying “Finally, The Rock has come back to (insert name of city or state)!”, heels often follow the same principle, but in reverse to get booed. Compare cheap heat.
clean finish
A match ending without cheating at all, (including low blows and being hit with weapons).
clean wrestling
Matches pitting two faces with no storyline animosity against each other, both obeying the rules throughout. Such matches are characterized by an emphasis on displaying technical wrestling skill instead of working the audience and a general air of sportsmanship. Although a staple of British and Japanese wrestling, it is uncommon in North America. One notable "clean" match which took place in North America is Hulk Hogan vs. Ultimate Warrior at WrestleMania VI in 1990.
closet champion
A titleholder (usually a heel) who ducks top-flight matches, cheats to win (often by managerial interference), and—when forced to wrestle good opponents—deliberately causes themself to be disqualified (since titles often do not change hands by disqualification) to retain the title.
color
The amount of bloodshed in a match.
comeback
A moment in which a wrestler who has been dominated during "the heat" manages to turn things around and fight back successfully, typically leading into the finish. Usually done by faces to earn sympathy and support from the audience. The expression "feeding a comeback" refers to behavior by heels to increase the dramatic impact of a comeback. See also Hulking up & hot tag.
crimson mask
A face covered in blood, comparable to a mask.
cross-promotion

An event which occurs when two or more rival promotions put together one card or wrestling event. Some promoters have used cross-promotion style angles to further interest. Cross-promotion dates back to the early days of wrestling as challenges between rival promoters in the same area often occurred.
curtain jerker
See jerk the curtain
cutoff

A point in a match in which the heel stops the face's attack or comeback and goes on the offensive. Typically achieved with an underhanded tactic or opportunistic attack.

== D ==
dark match
A non-televised match at a televised show (compare house show). A dark match before the show is often used to test new talent or warm up the crowd and will sometimes feature local independent talent or contracted lower card and developmental wrestlers who are signed to a major promotion's roster in the case of WWE, TNA, and AEW. A dark match after the show typically features main event level wrestlers, in order to sell more tickets and send the crowd home happy, without affecting TV storylines. Some promotions may broadcast the dark matches, such as All Elite Wrestling, which showed the dark matches on YouTube as AEW Dark and AEW Dark: Elevation. Both programs were cancelled in April 2023 with the introduction of AEW Collision.
deathmatch wrestling
The bloodiest and most violent form of hardcore wrestling, popular in Japan, Mexico, and some parts of the United States (notably CZW and GCW). In deathmatch wrestling, many of the traditional rules of professional wrestling are not enforced and the usage of objects such as barbed wire, panes of glass, fluorescent light tubes, and weed whackers occurs. May also incorporate elements such as fire and explosives.
dirt sheet
An insider newsletter (or website) in the professional wrestling business. Sometimes written in a negative tone or as a means to "get dirt".
double down
A point in the match in which both wrestlers are prone in the ring.
double shot
Where a wrestler competes twice in one day.
double team

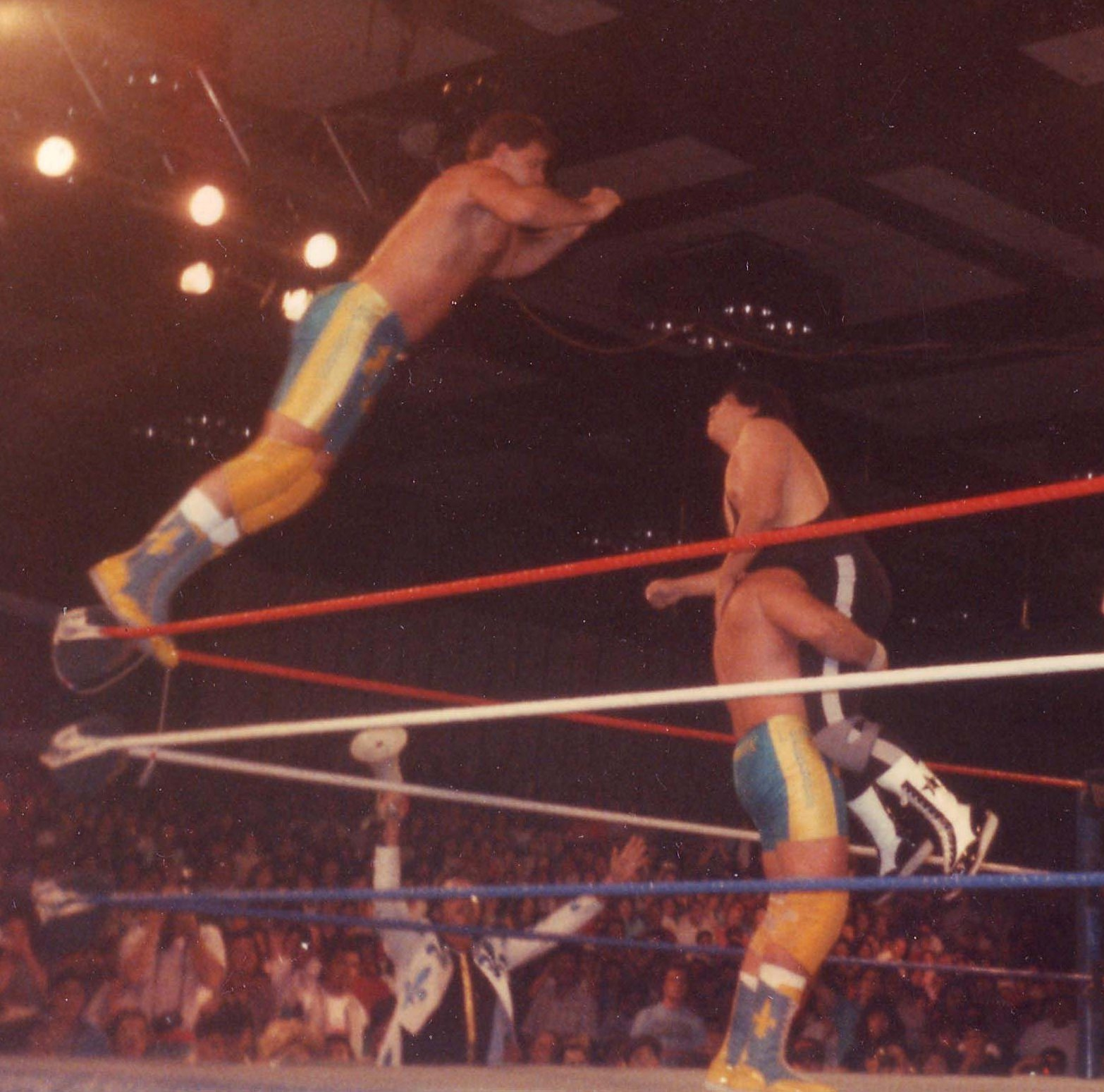
The Fabulous Rougeaus performing a double team maneuver (March 1989)

A tactic used in a tag team match when both members of a tag team gang up on one of the opponents, or a move that involves two wrestlers working in unison.
double turn
The occurrence when both the face and the heel switch roles during an angle or a match. Arguably the most famous example is that of Stone Cold Steve Austin versus Bret Hart at WrestleMania 13, where Austin entered as a heel and Hart entered as a face, but due to Austin fighting on through blood and passing out to a move by Hart, and Hart's post-match beat down, the two switched roles to end the match.
draw

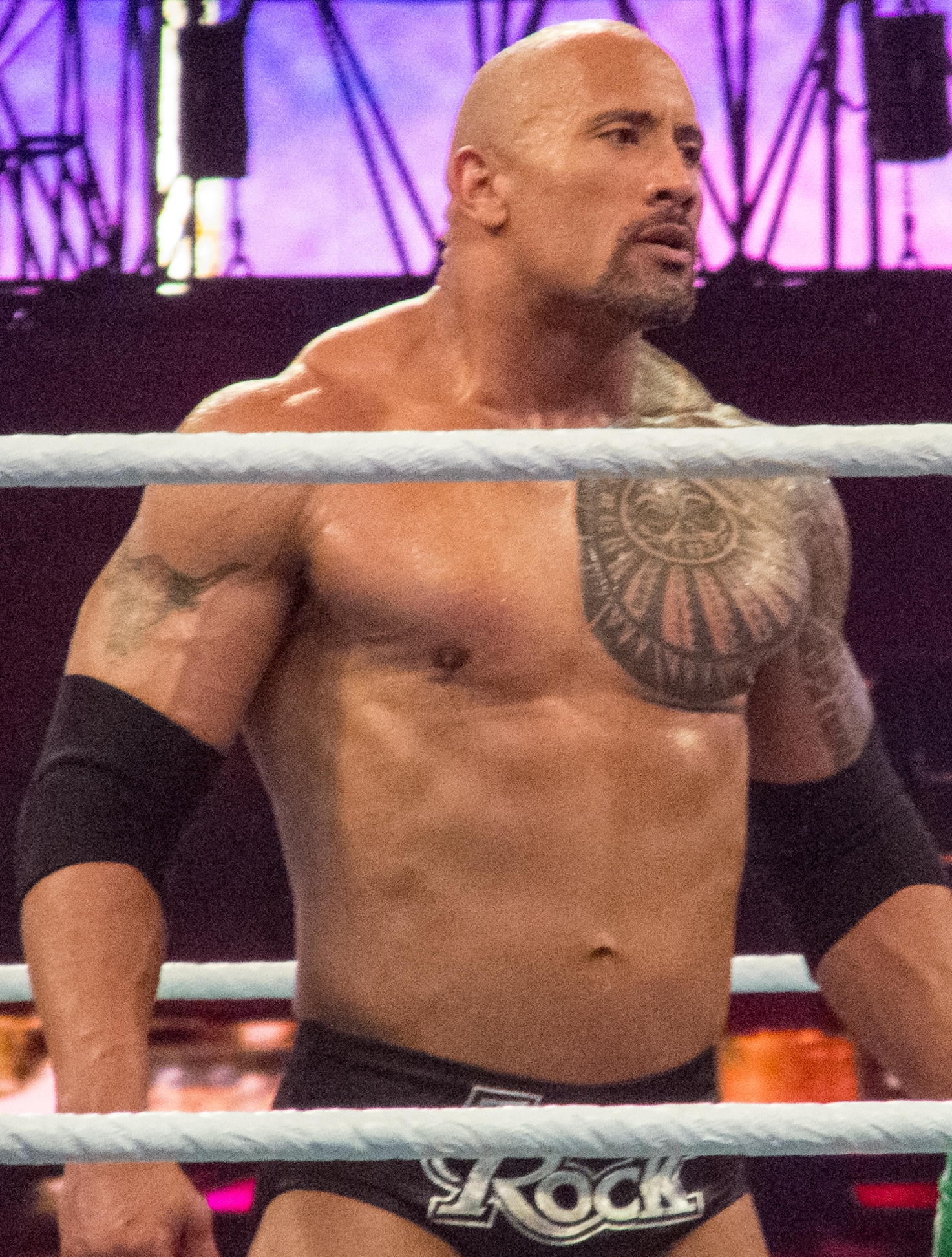
The Rock was a major draw for WWE, having won the Wrestling Observer Newsletter's Best Box Office Draw award three times

A wrestler or program that attracts the attention of the audience; someone fans are willing to pay to see. Derived from the term "drawing money", meaning the wrestler makes money for the promotion.
drop
To lose a match or championship (the loser agreed to drop the match to the winner).
Dusty finish
A finish in which the face appears to win a big match, but the decision is later reversed due to some sort of technicality, such as interference by other heels to save the heel champion, as, in most federations, the title could not change hands on such a disqualification. It can also refer to an ambiguous finish to a match where neither wrestler can claim to be the winner. Named after Dusty Rhodes, who booked many such finishes in the National Wrestling Alliance (NWA) and later in World Championship Wrestling (WCW).

== E ==
enforcer
1.

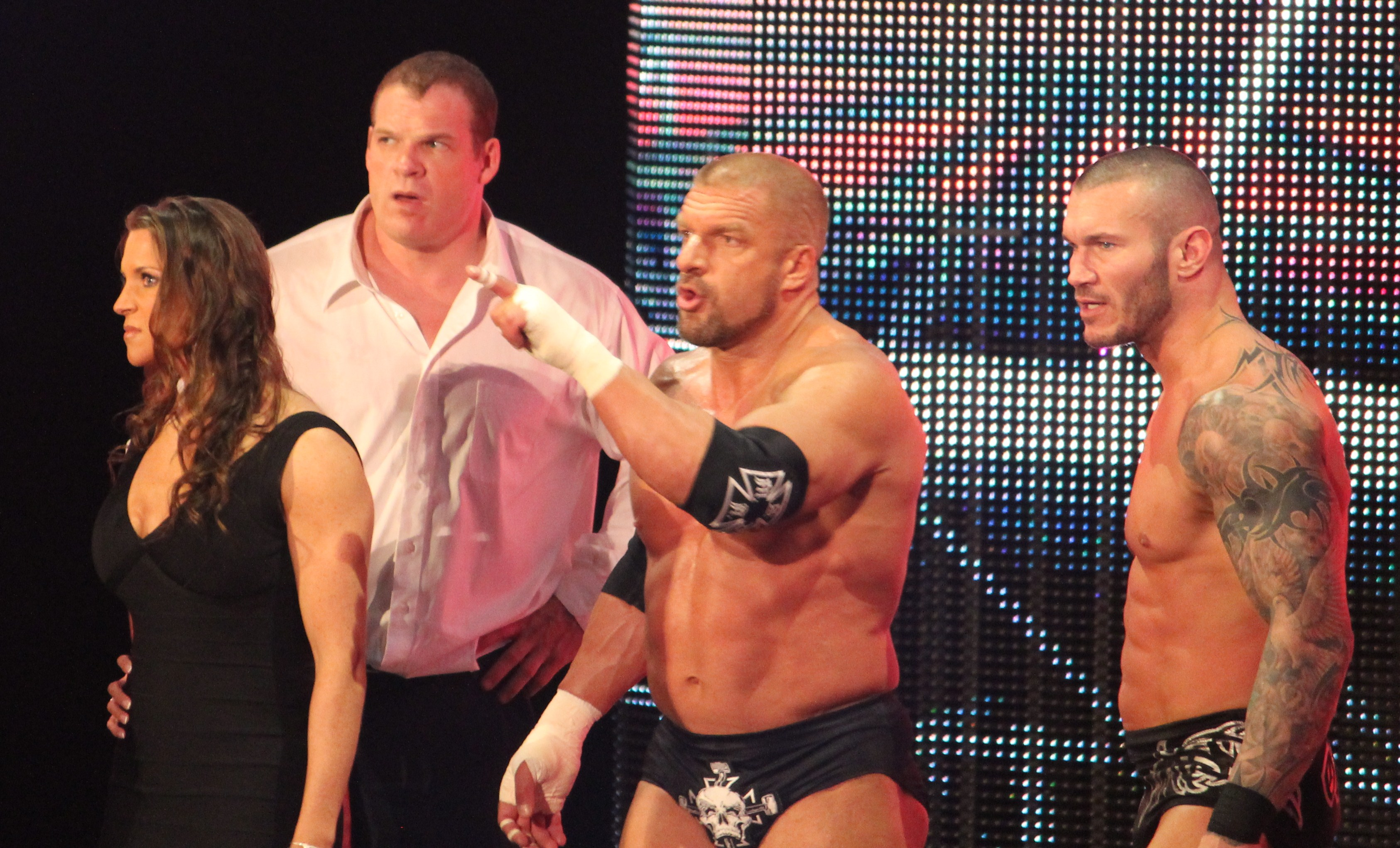
Kane (second left) as enforcer for The Authority

Also lackey or heavy

A (typically larger) wrestler who accompanies another wrestler as a second to matches and acts as a bodyguard.
2. An individual who acts in a "special guest referee" capacity from outside the ring, ostensibly to maintain order.
enhancement talent
See jobber.
exótico
A wrestler (typically a Mexican luchador) who competes in drag. Examples of exóticos include Mexico's Pimpinela Escarlata, America's Goldust and Vito, Wales' Adrian Street, and Japan's Yosuke Santa Maria.
extra
See jobber.
extreme wrestling
See Hardcore wrestling.

== F ==
face

A wrestler who is heroic, who is booked to be cheered by fans. Heels are the opposite of faces and faces commonly perform against heels.
face-in-peril

In a tag team match, the member of a face team who is dominated by the heel team for an extended period of the match. The tactic can be used to help get the crowd behind the face tag team and is usually followed up with a hot tag. During the 1980s, Ricky Morton of the Rock 'n' Roll Express was typically in this position while teaming with Robert Gibson; so much so that "playing Ricky Morton" has become synonymous with the term.
faction
A group of several wrestlers who band together and protect each other during matches. Different from a stable in that stables have a leader or spokesperson. Factions are also generally larger than stables.
fall
The ending of a match. A fall is obtained by gaining a decision in any manner, normally consisting of a pinfall, submission, countout, or disqualification. In a two out of three falls match, or a Mountevans Rules match, a wrestler must gain two decisions to win instead of only one. See also near-fall.
fallout show
The first televised show after a pay-per-view. Often new storylines are introduced in these episodes, and the consequences of the pay-per-view are explained. Contrast with go-home show.
false comeback

A brief offensive flurry by a face, before losing momentum back to a heel after being dominated for several minutes. Usually, it occurs before the actual comeback.
false finish
A pinfall attempt which is kicked out of, usually after a finisher or series of high-impact moves, and usually kicked out of just before the referee counts to three. This builds crowd anticipation toward the actual finish.
feed
The act of a heel blatantly running into a face's offence, typically as part of a comeback. With the intent of providing catharsis for the crowd & garnering renewed support for the face.
feud
A staged rivalry between multiple wrestlers or groups of wrestlers. They are integrated into ongoing storylines, particularly in events which are televised. Feuds may last for months or even years or be resolved with implausible speed, perhaps during the course of a single match.
fighting champion
A champion who defends their title often, and with most or all of the outcomes being victory by pinfall or submission.
finish
The planned end of a match. See clean finish, Dusty finish, and screwjob.
finisher
A wrestler's signature move that usually leads to the pinfall or submission. An example is Steve Austin and his Stunner.
five moves of doom
A particular combination of moves that a certain wrestler tends to use in every match, often in the same sequence, usually ending with their finisher. This term is usually used pejoratively, though it was not originally intended so by Dave Meltzer, who coined the term in the 1990s to describe the finishing sequence of Bret Hart, and later used by fans to describe that of John Cena.
forbidden door

The imagined barrier between competing wrestling promotions; wrestlers who are signed to one promotion but make appearances for another as part of a talent exchange agreement are said to have entered or passed through the Forbidden Door. The term was coined in January 2020 by New Japan Pro-Wrestling's Hiroshi Tanahashi when speaking of his desire to challenge Chris Jericho for the AEW World Championship. The term was further popularized by AEW general manager Tony Khan during an appearance on Impact Wrestling television during AEW wrestler Kenny Omega's concurrent reign as both AEW World Champion and Impact World Champion in 2021, and further codified in 2022 with AEW and NJPW announcing a joint pay-per-view with that title, which became the first of an annual series.
foreign object
A weapon that is not allowed to be used in the match. Usually found under the ring or ringside, in a wrestler's tights, or handed to wrestlers by managers, interfering wrestlers, or (less commonly) audience members. If a foreign object is used behind the referee's back, it usually leads to a pinfall. The same object is typically less effective in a match where it is legal. At one point in World Championship Wrestling (WCW)'s history, this was referred to as "international objects" by commentators due to a misunderstanding of WCW owner Ted Turner's objections to the use of the word "foreign" applied throughout his media empire, when he intended only to restrict the word's use on his news networks.
Freebird rule
A "rule" that allows a three-wrestler stable to challenge for and defend a tag-team championship with any two of its members. Named for The Fabulous Freebirds, who popularized this concept.
full package
A wrestler who can perform well in their wrestling technique, promotional/speaking skills on the microphone, and have an appearance that backs their skillset up. Sometimes called a 'complete package'.
future endeavored
Fired or leaving a promotion. Inspired by WWE's announcement of a wrestler's release, typically wishing the subject "all the best in their future endeavors."

== G ==
garbage wrestling
Derisive term for hardcore wrestling, especially deathmatches. Often used by professional wrestling critics as an insult against hardcore independent promotions.
gas
1. Steroids.
2. Stamina, as in "out of gas".
gassed
Exhausted or out of breath during a match.
get one’s shit in
A wrestler’s planned sequence of spots in a match including signature moves, taunts, and finishers.
gig
The blade a wrestler uses to cut themselves. The act of cutting oneself with a gig is sometimes referred to as gigging. See blading.
gimmick

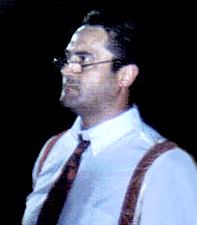
Mike Rotunda used a tax collector gimmick as Irwin R. Schyster

1. The character portrayed by a wrestler. Can be used to refer specifically to the motif or theme evoked by a character, as indicated by their name, costume or other paraphernalia, or to refer to any aspect of the worked presentation, sometimes negatively (e.g., a gimmick match, which can also have an event based on it, such as WWE Hell in a Cell, referred to as a gimmick event/PPV).
2. A wrestler's finisher.
glorified jobber

A jobber who defeats "pure jobbers" as well as mid-card wrestlers in matches, but consistently loses to main event level wrestlers.
go away heat
When a wrestler, heel or face, evokes a negative reaction not through their working of the audience but because the audience are not entertained by the wrestler and do not want to watch them perform. Compare X-Pac heat.
go home
To finish a match. One wrestler would tell the other to "go home" when it is time for them to execute the planned ending for their match. Referees may also tell the wrestlers to go home (usually after receiving word to do so from a producer backstage).
go-home show
The final televised show before a pay-per-view event. So named because the promotion will often have no house shows in the next few days before the pay-per-view, in order to give the wrestlers a chance to literally go home and rest up so they may bring their A-game at the pay-per-view. On several occasions, go-home shows would be broadcast live. Contrast with fallout show.
going into business for him/herself
When a wrestler starts working for their own benefit rather than the mutual benefit of themselves and their opponents or partners, typically by refusing to sell or by saying something not agreed to in a promo. A type of shoot.
gold
A championship belt.
good hand
A decent, skilled, dependable performer, that gels with the wrestlers he or she works with and consistently puts on a good show.
go over
To win in a wrestling match.
goozle
The act of forcefully grabbing an opponent by their neck with a single arm, usually precedes a chokeslam.
Gorilla position
The staging area just behind the curtain where wrestlers come out to the ring. It has expanded to be the location of the production control hub. Named after Gorilla Monsoon, who could often be seen standing there during WWF/WWE PPVs. The Gorilla Position in World Championship Wrestling was named after Jody Hamilton and was commonly referred to as the "Jody Position." In All Elite Wrestling, the "go position" is named the "Mongo Position" after Brian Muster, a member of the production who had been nicknamed "Mongo" by his colleagues.
green
Refers to a wrestler who is in the early stages of their career and, as a result, may be prone to making mistakes because of their inexperience.
gusher
A deep cut that bleeds a lot, usually caused by a mistake while blading, but can be intentional. An example happened at the Judgment Day PPV in 2004, when Eddie Guerrero accidentally hit a blood vessel when blading.

== H ==
hard camera
The main camera(s) that shoots the ring from the crowd. These are positioned in the first level of permanent seats usually at about the center court/center ice area of a venue.
hardcore wrestling
A style of wrestling that emphasizes brutality and real violence with matches typically involving minimal technical wrestling, instead focusing on moderate brawling techniques, highspots and the frequent use of weapons. Extreme Championship Wrestling and Combat Zone Wrestling are known for using this style.
hardway
A wrestler drawing blood by any means other than blading, typically from a legitimate strike or potato.
head drop
A move which, as a result of a botch or otherwise, causes the receiver to be dropped on their head, often resulting in a legit concussion or other injury such as a broken neck. Also, especially in puroresu, the term can refer to a bump which is intended to make a move appear as if the receiver landed on their head. In reality, the full force of the move is intended to be taken on the upper back and shoulders, though such moves still carry a high degree of legitimate risk with them. Some wrestlers have used moves where the receiver lands on their head as their finisher, including Kenta Kobashi, who used the highly dangerous Burning Hammer as his finisher.
heat
1. Negative reactions (such as booing) from fans. When the heat is directed at a heel, this is seen as a good thing, as it means fans are reacting in the desired way.
2. The stage of a formulaic match in which the heel dominates the face. Preceded by the cutoff, followed by the comeback (often with false comebacks sprinkled in).
3. Real-life tension or ill will between two wrestlers, or a wrestler and the promotion.
heater
A wrestler; usually a jobber who is used against a more valued opponent to "heat them up" perhaps after a recent loss or succession of losses.
heel

A wrestler who is villainous, who is booked to be booed by fans. Faces are the opposite of heels, and heels commonly perform against faces.
hey rube
A carny term for a real fight or other such incident (typically involving "marks"), used in the territory days as a rallying cry for help from other wrestling personal.
hide

To choreograph a match (or series thereof) to cover up a wrestler's injury, inexperience, or lack of ability.
highspot
1. A point in a match where the crowd's emotional engagement & investment is heightened past the baseline level (literally, the "high spot" of the match) due to something exciting taking place. Typically part of the comeback.
2.

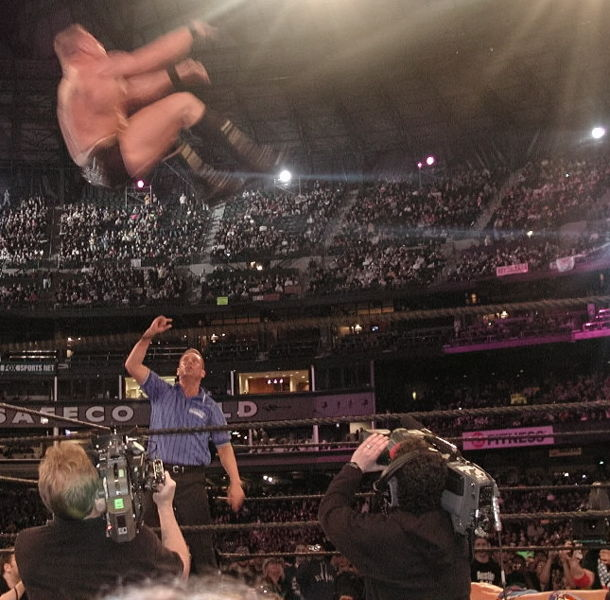
Brock Lesnar performing a highspot; a shooting star press at WrestleMania XIX

A high-stakes move which is perceived to be risky and very dangerous, often legitimately. Considered a misunderstanding of the original term by veterans, that has been disseminated & normalised by fans.
Hollywood
A popular heel/face persona based on the idea of a performer having real-world success and fame which transcends the wrestling business. Used by wrestlers such as Hulk Hogan, The Rock, Batista, and The Miz.
hooker
A wrestler with strong legitimate mat-wrestling abilities and an array of match-ending (or in extreme cases, career ending) holds known as "hooks", hence the name. Primarily a holdover from the days where professional wrestling had to maintain kayfabe, a hooker would be used against a local non-wrestler brawler to enhance the belief that professional wrestling was "real". Additionally, the champion would most often be a hooker in order to avoid his opponents trying to shoot on him. One of the most famous hookers in wrestling history was world champion Lou Thesz.
home base
A centralized or fixed production facility where a promotion regularly tapes its television shows and or holds major events, often at a television studio or a purpose-built arena. Examples of this include Disney MGM Studios which hosted World Championship Wrestling tapings from 1993 to 1997, the Impact Zone at Universal Studios Florida which was served as a fixed production facility for World Championship Wrestling from 1997 to 1998, Total Nonstop Action Wrestling from 2004 to 2018, All Elite Wrestling from 2021 to 2023 when they taped various episodes of Dark and Dark: Elevation, Ring of Honor in 2023 for when they taped their weekly show, Full Sail Live which held regular WWE NXT tapings from 2012 to 2020, and Skyway Studios which hosted tapings for Impact Wrestling from 2020 to 2021 and the National Wrestling Alliance from 2022 to 2023. Promotions also have taped their programming or held events in facilities that they own or operate. Examples include Daily's Place which hosted All Elite Wrestling events on a regular basis from 2020 to 2021 and served as the promotion's headquarters until 2026, the Hotpoint Davis Arena which has been the headquarters for Ohio Valley Wrestling since 2002, the Harley Race Wrestling Arena which has hosted regular tapings for World League Wrestling since 2014, and the WWE Performance Center which has been a regular host for NXT since 2020 and Evolve tapings since 2025.
hoss
A wrestler who is physically large, but lacks other skills. A match between two large men who use plenty of stiff strikes is sometimes known as a "hossfest".
hotshot
A rushed feud, climax of a feud, or big match on television instead of at a pay-per-view in order to get a short-term boost for business. Also applies to angles or turns that are done for shock value rather than acting as a part of an ongoing storyline.
hot tag
In a tag team match, the face's tag to a fresh partner after several minutes of being dominated by both heels, usually immediately followed by the freshly tagged partner getting in a quick burst of offense. Often the hot tag happens after several teases (where the other face is enticed into the ring, only to be stopped by the referee and the heels getting away with illegal tactics, or a legal tag being made while the referee is distracted, resulting in the referee forcing the fresh partner out of the ring because "he was not tagged in"). The classic definition also requires that the tag itself be sudden and unexpected, from a position of apparent hopelessness for the face-in-peril.
house
The amount of money drawn at a particular event. Also, a term denoting how many fans are in attendance for an event (e.g., "that looks like a packed house tonight").
house show

An untelevised event.
Hulking up
A type of comeback spot that involves the face suddenly start to no-sell their opponent's offense, recovering more strength with every blow before finally striking back. Named after Hulk Hogan, who regularly used this as a part of his matches.

== I ==
idol wrestler

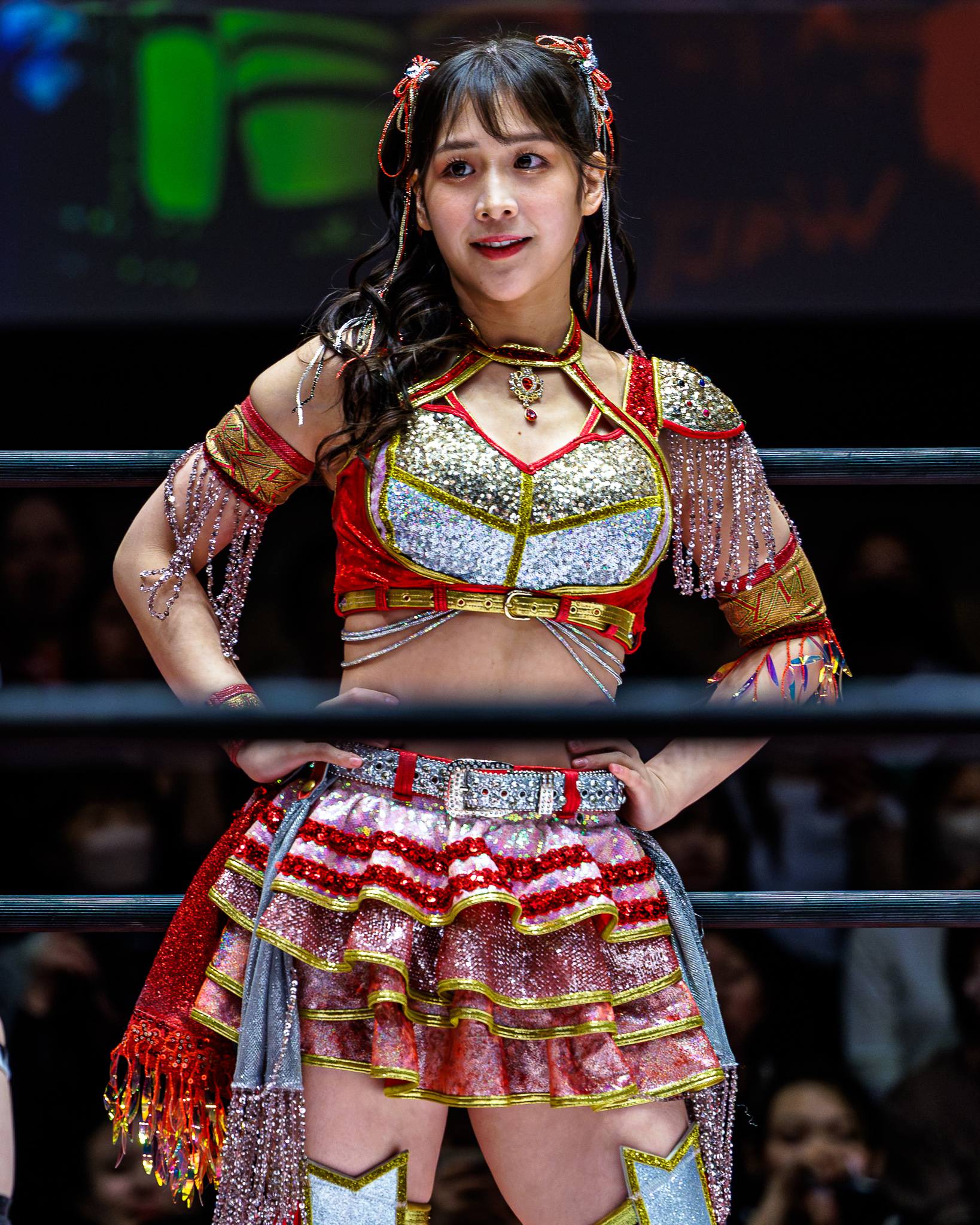
Wakana Uehara, an idol wrestler, appearing for Tokyo Joshi Pro-Wrestling

A Japanese term for joshi wrestlers who are known for their attractive appearance and may be involved in the Japanese idol industry. Idol wrestlers often sing songs and model in photo-books and/or on various video releases. Examples include Takako Inoue, Maki Itoh, Cutie Suzuki, and Riho.
iggy
Insider information; the truth about something. Also refers to a physical signal from one wrestler to another ("giving the iggy") to denote the appropriate moment when a maneuver is to be performed.
impromptu match
A match that takes place, specifically on pay-per-views, that was not advertised on the card before the event.
independent promotion

A smaller wrestling company that operates at a local (rather than national) level and typically employs freelance wrestlers, as opposed to signing wrestlers to exclusive contracts.
insurance policy
An “insurance policy” refers to a valet (typically a person with a large physical presence) or a wrestler who serves on behalf of a villainous character or faction to achieve or to ensure a specific target. The term was especially popular in WWE, where Vince McMahon dubbed Paul Wight his “insurance policy” for The Corporation upon his debut for the company at St. Valentine's Day Massacre: In Your House, ensuring that “Stone Cold” Steve Austin would not make it to WrestleMania XV.
interbrand
A term used by WWE during their brand extension to reference a match between talent from the Raw, SmackDown, ECW, or NXT brands.
interpromotional

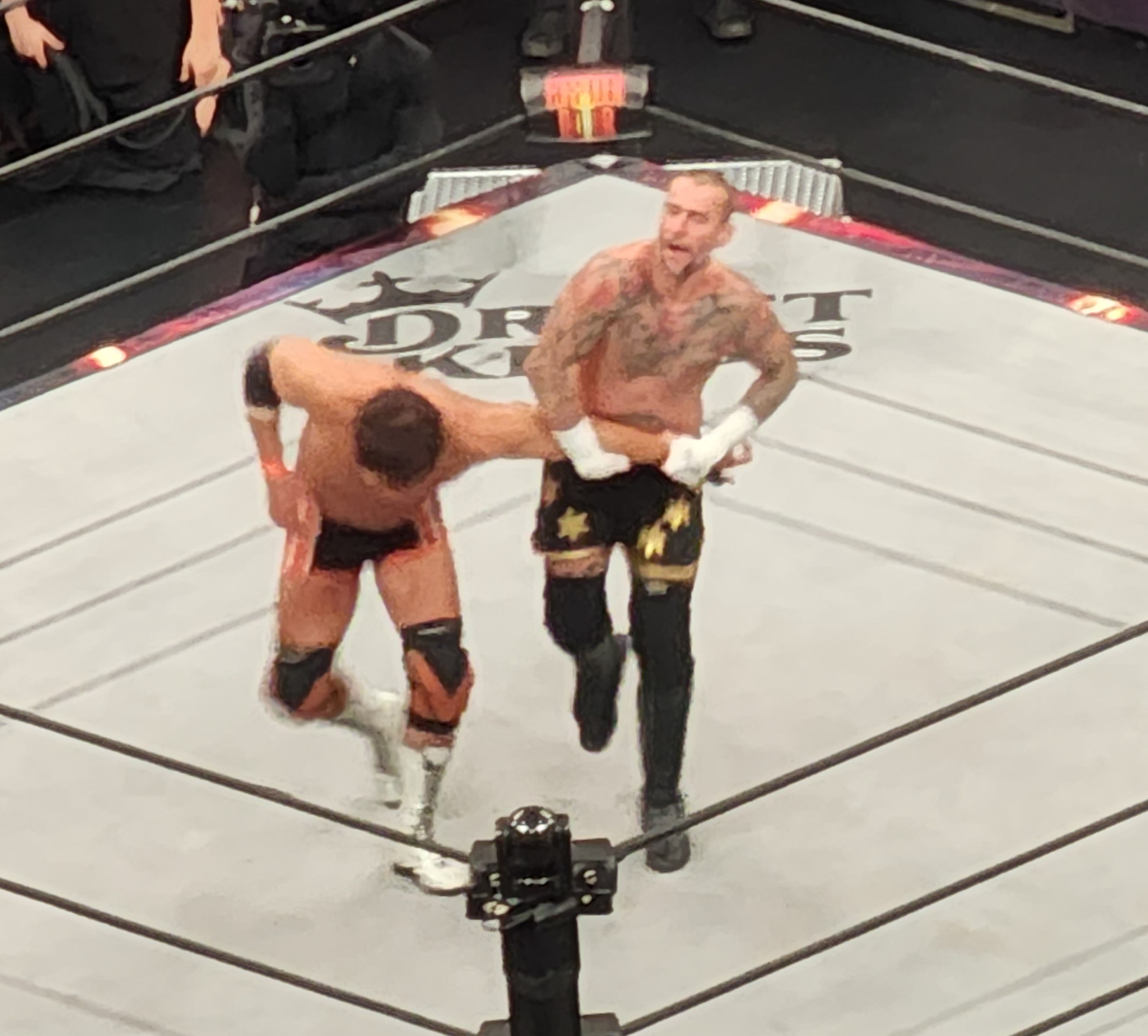
AEW's CM Punk (right) faces NJPW's Satoshi Kojima in an interpromotional match at Forbidden Door (2023)

Also known as cross-promotion. A match or event involving wrestlers from two or more different promotions wrestling, usually against each other, on the same card.
interference
The act of someone who is not part of the match (including a second) getting involved; this may involve distracting or assaulting one or more of the participants in the match.
in the can
A term used to refer to a wrestling television program that has already been filmed and/or edited to air on tape delay at a later date but has not yet done so.
invasion storyline
A storyline in which a group of wrestlers from one promotion appear in another promotion. In some cases, this happens suddenly without advance warning or notice, and usually involves the invaders attempting to take the promotion over.
IWC
An initialism for "Internet Wrestling Community"; it is a term used to describe a community of internet users (some of them smarks on social media) who engage in discourse about professional wrestling online.

== J ==
jerk the curtain
To wrestle the first match of the card. Refers to the curtain separating the entranceway from backstage. A wrestler commonly booked in this position is a "curtain jerker". In recent years, this term has become much less pejorative, with many main event level wrestlers choosing to have the first match of the show, as a way to "set the tone".
job
To lose in a wrestling match.
jobber

A wrestler who routinely loses in order to build the credibility of other wrestlers.
joshi
Shorthand for joshi puroresu; Japanese women's professional wrestling.
juice
1. Steroids. Same as gas.
2. Blood, usually from the forehead. See also blading.

== K ==
kayfabe
The presentation of professional wrestling as being entirely legitimate or unscripted. Prior to the mid-1980s, this was universally maintained across all wrestling territories and promotions.
Used by some in the industry as a verb meaning to hide or keep something a secret. Also used in community spaces as an adverb or adjective to indicate something is part of a planned storyline or match ("in kayfabe" or "kayfabe injury").
kick-out
To use the legs to kick or power out of a pin by using the force made to lift the shoulders off the mat.
To escape a pin by one's own power- by any means except rope break or interference
king's road
This term describes the style of wrestling All Japan Pro Wrestling uses. It is a fusion of the Japanese strong style and a more American style of professional wrestling. King's road practitioners incorporated increasingly more stiff strikes and head drops during the 1990s.

== L ==
legit

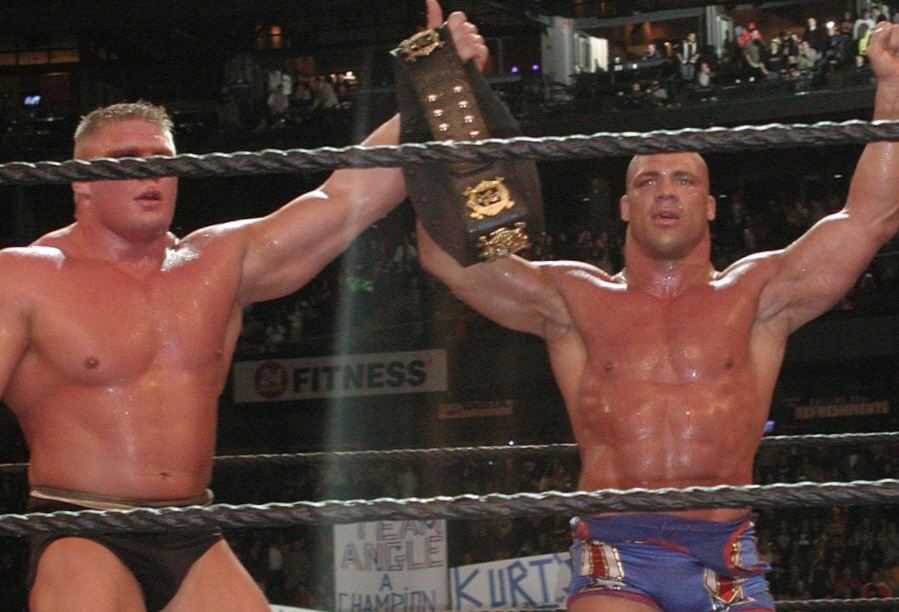
Brock Lesnar (left) and Kurt Angle both have legit backgrounds, having been distinguished amateur wrestlers.

1. Refers to real-life incidents or events that have not been booked or scripted and are therefore not part of the fictional and kayfabe presentation. It is often used to describe a genuine injury to a wrestler, as opposed to one scripted as part of a storyline.
2. Used to describe a wrestler who has a genuine background in another combat sport (typically boxing, other wrestling codes, or mixed martial arts) and so has proven "real" fighting skills.
lights out
A spot in which the house lights are suddenly turned down to allow for a surprise of some kind.
local competitor
An unsigned wrestler that is usually put into squash matches with company wrestlers to build the other's momentum. Often used so known wrestlers from the promotion do not have to job.
local medical facility
WWE's term for 'hospital'. Used in kayfabe scenarios when a wrestler is injured and was coined to prevent fans from calling an actual hospital during the time in which kayfabe was not yet broken.
lock up

A portion of a match, usually the very start of the match, where two wrestlers join in a collar-and-elbow tie up.
low-carder
A wrestler who typically wrestles near the beginning of a show and does not participate in major storylines or matches. Often seen as being at the bottom of a promotion's hierarchy.
lumberjack (m)
lumberjill (f)
A wrestler, typically, who stands close to the ring, usually in a lumberjack match, in which he or she (and others similarly called upon) are to forcibly return to the ring any wrestler who attempts to leave or is expelled therefrom. Usually, in the case of a heel, he or she is actually helping one or more (rarely all) wrestlers.
lucha libre
Mexican professional wrestling. Translates to "free fight" and is sometimes shortened to simply lucha, the Mexican style of professional wrestling is characterized by high-flying aerial moves, colored masks, and the rapid series of holds, strikes, and maneuvers.
lucharesu
The specific fusion style of professional wrestling that could involve the high-flying acrobatic moves of lucha libre and the suplexes, strong martial arts strikes, physicality, and psychology of puroresu or strong-style wrestling. Largely pioneered by Gran Hamada's Universal Lucha Libre and by Michinoku Pro and further popularized by Toryumon/Dragongate.

== M ==
main event
The headline or marquee match of a show. Almost always the last match of the show, although some exceptions exist. The penultimate match on a card is sometimes referred to as the semi main-event.
main eventer
A wrestler who is seen as on the highest level in a promotion and typically headlines shows. Often wrestling for the world title of a promotion.
manager

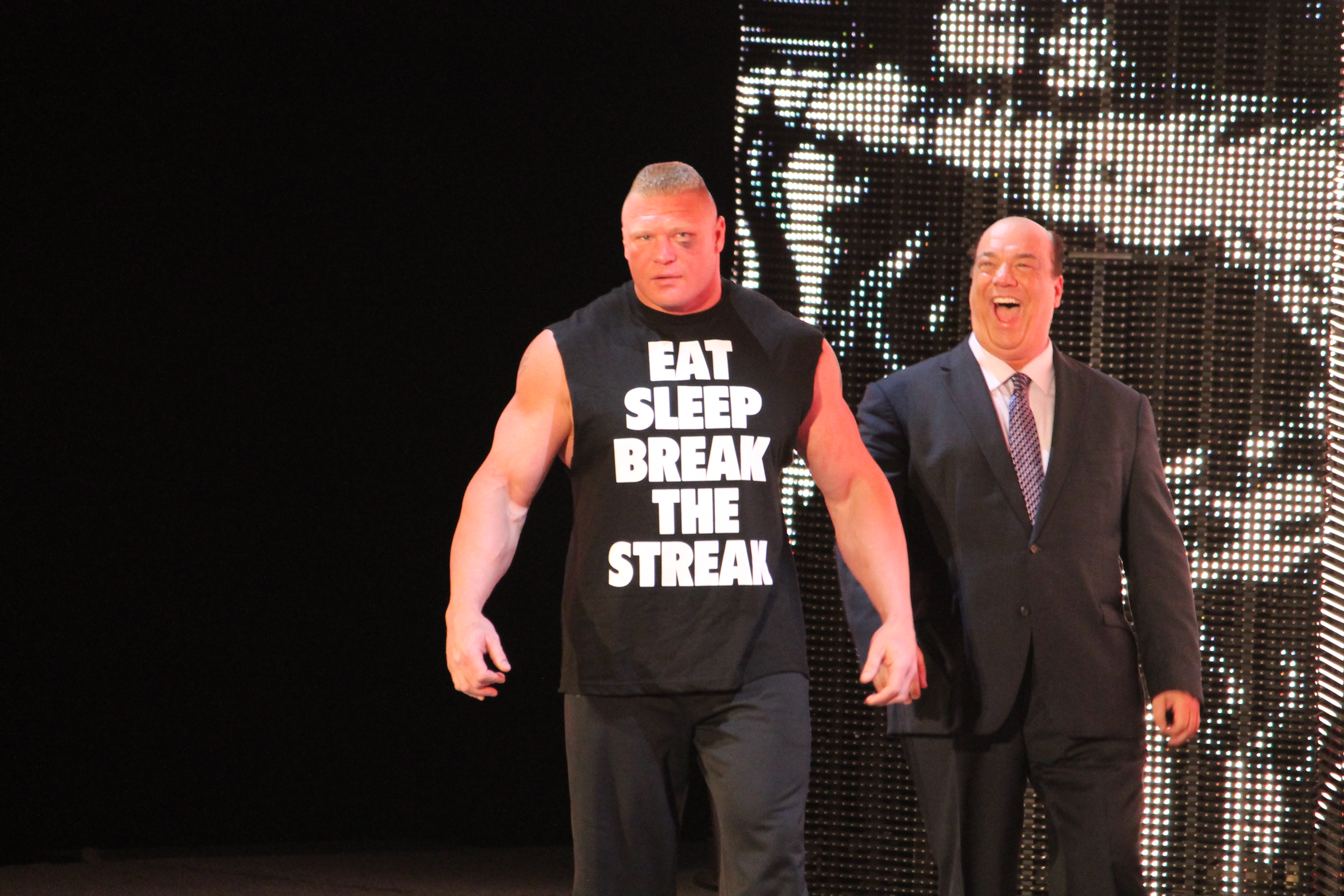
Paul Heyman (right) as manager of Brock Lesnar

A performer (usually a non-wrestler) who is paired with one or more wrestlers in order to help them get over, often by acting as a mouthpiece or interfering in matches on their behalf. Typically, managers are seen accompanying their wrestlers to the ring and are presented as having some sort of influence or sway over their wrestlers.
mark
1. A wrestling fan who enthusiastically believes or behaves as though they believe professional wrestling is not staged, or loses sight of the staged nature of the business while supporting their favorite wrestlers. The term is often used pejoratively, for example to refer to people who have little or no knowledge about the business, or who get too emotionally involved to see a situation objectively. The term can also refer to wrestling fans generally, although not always in a pejorative context.
2. Used by some industry insiders to describe a participant in the wrestling industry whom they think believes that any worked aspect of the industry is more important than the money they can earn; for example, being preoccupied with holding a title belt rather than being paid more will often see a wrestler described as a "mark for him/herself."
married
To be paired with another wrestler (or tag team) in a long series of matches.

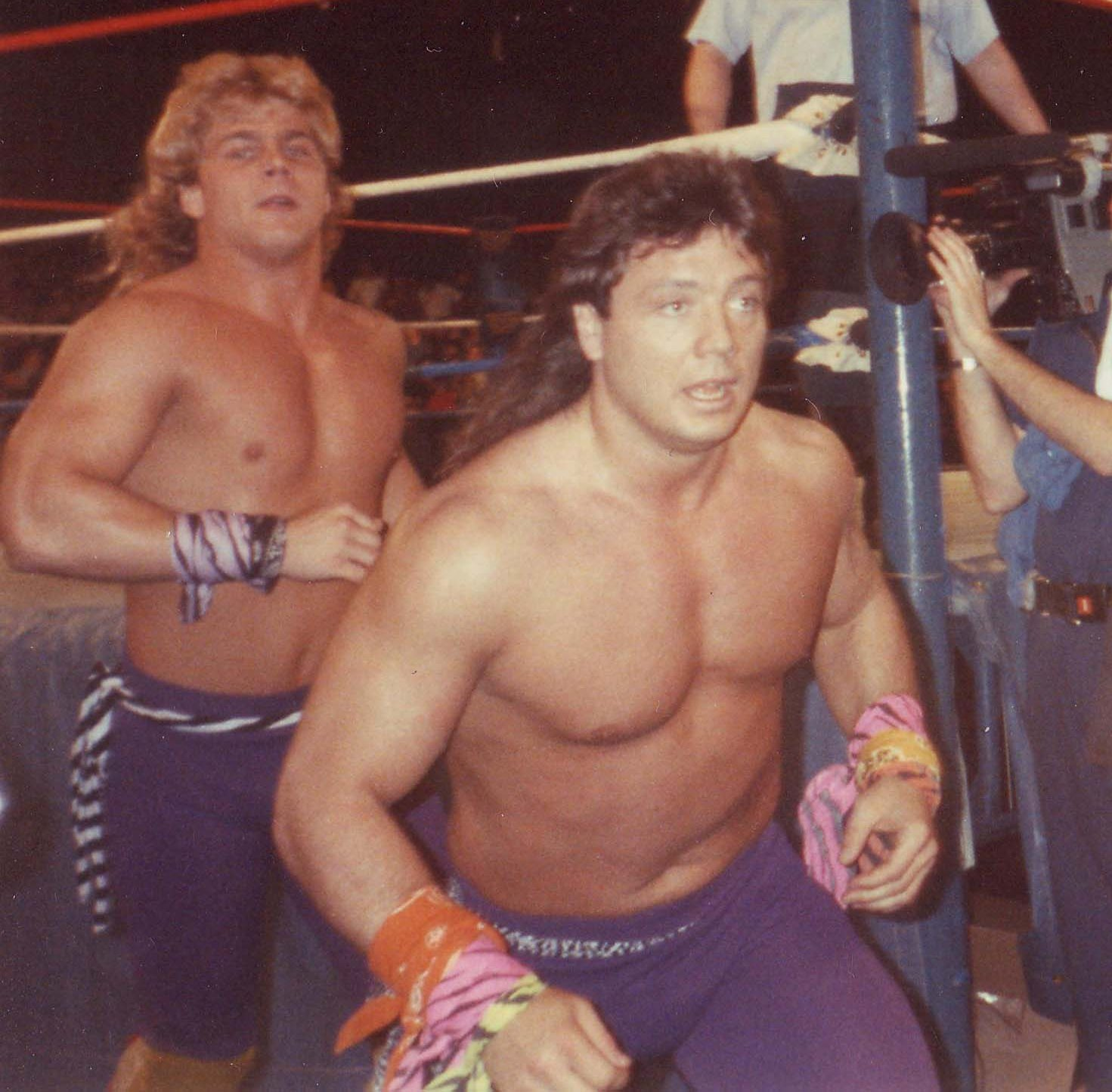
Marty Jannetty (front) during his time in The Rockers with Shawn Michaels

Marty Jannetty

Derisive term given to a member of a tag team who, upon the breakup of the team, achieves markedly less success than their partner. Coined in reference to Marty Jannetty, who teamed with Shawn Michaels to form The Rockers. While Michaels went to become a four-time world champion and two-time WWE Hall of Famer, Jannetty was released from the WWF two months after the team's breakup and would repeatedly be hired and fired from the promotion (and other promotions) over the next twenty years, almost always participating in storylines which related to his status as Michaels's former partner. Other wrestlers often seen as a Jannetty of a team include Rick Steiner of The Steiner Brothers, Stevie Ray of Harlem Heat, and Jim Neidhart of The Hart Foundation.
mechanic
A wrestler whose job it is to feud with the future main event performers and help get them ready for the position. Other times, mechanics are the in-ring teachers helping younger wrestlers gain experience and ability.
mic work

The ability to generate reaction from the audience using words, and generally by speaking using a microphone.
mid-carder
A wrestler who is seen as higher than a low-carder, but below a main eventer, typically performing in the middle of a show. Often wrestling for the secondary title of a federation.
missed spot

A move or series of moves which are mistimed.
money mark
Someone who founds or invests in a wrestling promotion mainly to associate with wrestlers, often willfully or ignorantly disregarding financial risks a profit-focused investor would avoid.
money match
A highly promoted non-title match at or near the end of a card, which is a main selling point for an event.
monster

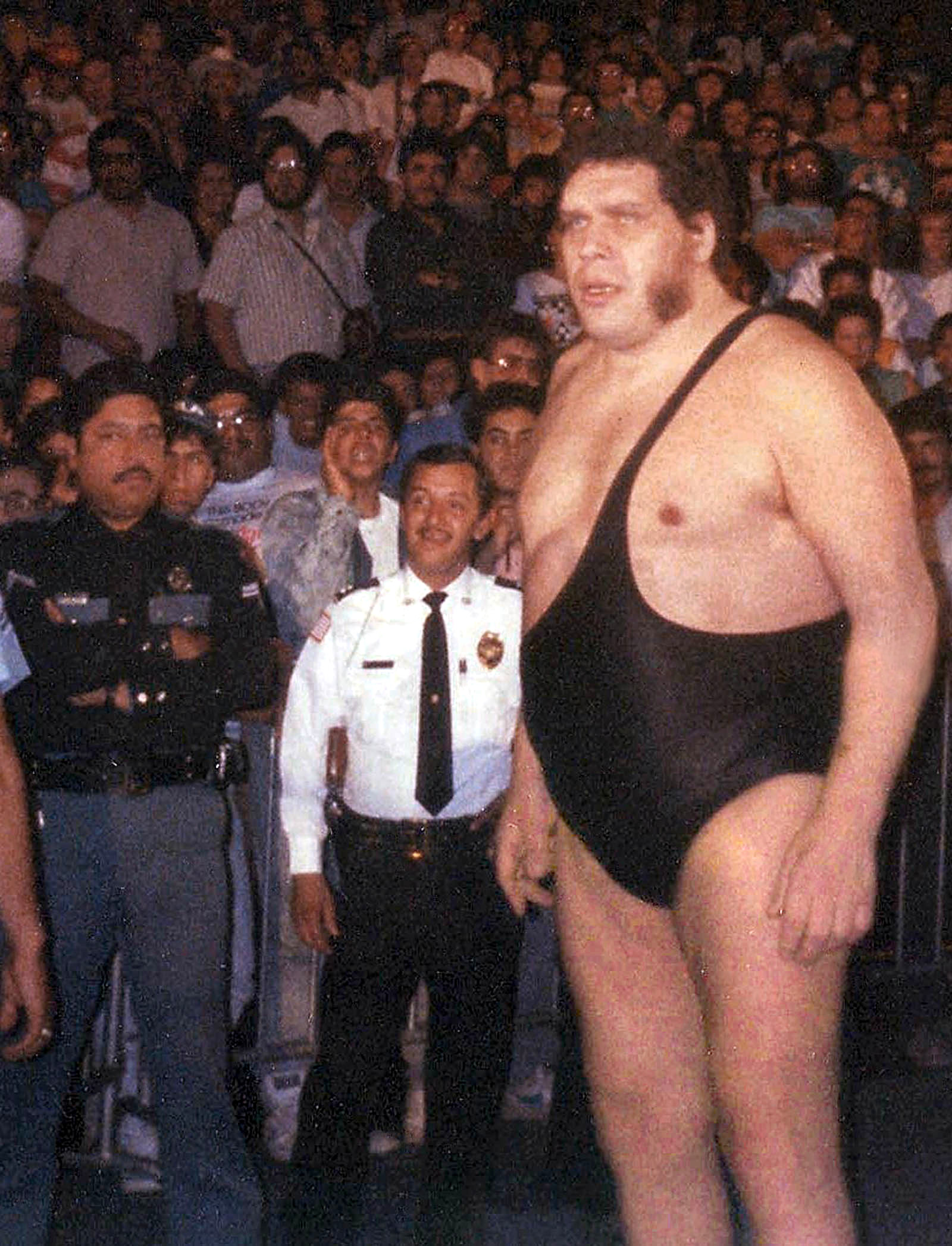
André the Giant was a notable monster heel late in his career

An extremely powerful, seemingly unbeatable wrestler, often of intimidating size, either face or heel, who often wins matches in a quick, one-sided manner.
mouthpiece
A manager who does the promos, or all the talking, for a wrestler possessing poor oration skills.
Muta scale
An informal measure among some fans of the amount of blood lost by a wrestler during a match. The scale begins at 0.0 Muta (no blood), with 1.0 Muta being equivalent to the blood loss of Great Muta during an infamous 1992 New Japan Pro-Wrestling match with Hiroshi Hase.

== N ==
name test
A hypothetical test that questions whether a wrestler's given/proposed stage name would sound appropriate headlining a marquee card. Coined by Jim Cornette & allegedly used by Vince McMahon. See also airport test.
near-fall
An occurrence in which a wrestler's shoulders are pinned to the mat for a count of two, but the wrestler manages to escape before the referee's hand hits the mat a third time, which would signify a pinfall. "Two-and-a-half count" or other fractions used to denote even closer "counts", such as "two-and-three-quarters", are often used many times in matches to build excitement.
night off
To be paired for a match with a wrestler who is typically easy to work with.
no contest
A match that ends in a draw without any clear resolution. This is often due to unforeseen circumstances such as an injury, a major spot or angle which overshadows proceedings, or the referee being presented as having lost control of the match. No contest finishes also serve the purpose to protect the wrestlers involved.
no-sell
To show no reaction to an opponent's offensive moves; a way to demonstrate endurance, appear invulnerable to pain, illustrate masochistic tendencies, or intentionally bury an opponent. Generally, no-selling is worked as a part of kayfabe, but several wrestlers are known to have shoot no-sold their opponent's moves for various reasons. Compare sell and over-sell.
no-show
A wrestler's or performer's unplanned absence from a show in which they were booked, often leading to last minute changes on the show's card.
nuclear heat
A high level of heat, when fans are agitated to the point of being legitimately angry or upset.

== O ==
the office
Slang for the promoter/booker/agents, as opposed to being "one of the boys" (i.e. the locker-room of performing talents). Used more prominently in the territory era, when wrestlers were effectively all free agents and were at greater risk of being unfairly manipulated for a promotion's gain.
outlaw
Term from the territory era to describe a promotion that was not an official member of the overseeing National Wrestling Alliance body, and thus was not held to the same professional standards. Also derisively called "mudshows", for their tendency to be held outdoors at events like fairs. Considered a precursor to modern independent promotions, so used derisively in present day (thanks in large part to Jim Cornette) to refer to particularly low-budget or otherwise embarrassing productions, ala garbage wrestling.
over
Achieving the desired crowd reaction, with the audience buying into a performer or gimmick. Faces who are over will be cheered, and heels who are over will be booed. Sometimes particular aspects of a performer's presentation may be over (such as a specific chant, a move they perform or their ring entrance) without the performer themselves being considered over. Building a rapport with the audience is described as "getting over".
over-booking
A match or angle that is perceived to have been written or choreographed to be more complicated than necessary. Often through the overuse of run-ins, interference, ref bumps and non-wrestling related elements. Promoters such as Vince Russo and Tony Khan have been noted for booking matches and segments that some critics describe as overly complex, through frequent use of interference, dense match layouts, and multiple unresolved storylines with little to no payoff.
over-sell
To show too much of a reaction to an opponent's offense. Over-selling may be done accidentally, for example during a missed spot, or intentionally for various reasons, as occurred in the match between Hulk Hogan and Shawn Michaels at SummerSlam in 2005, where Michaels frequently over-sold Hogan's moves. Wrestlers such as Curt Hennig and Dolph Ziggler are notable for over-selling. Compare sell and no-sell.

== P ==
paper
To give out free tickets to an event to make it look better attended than it otherwise would have been.
Parts unknown

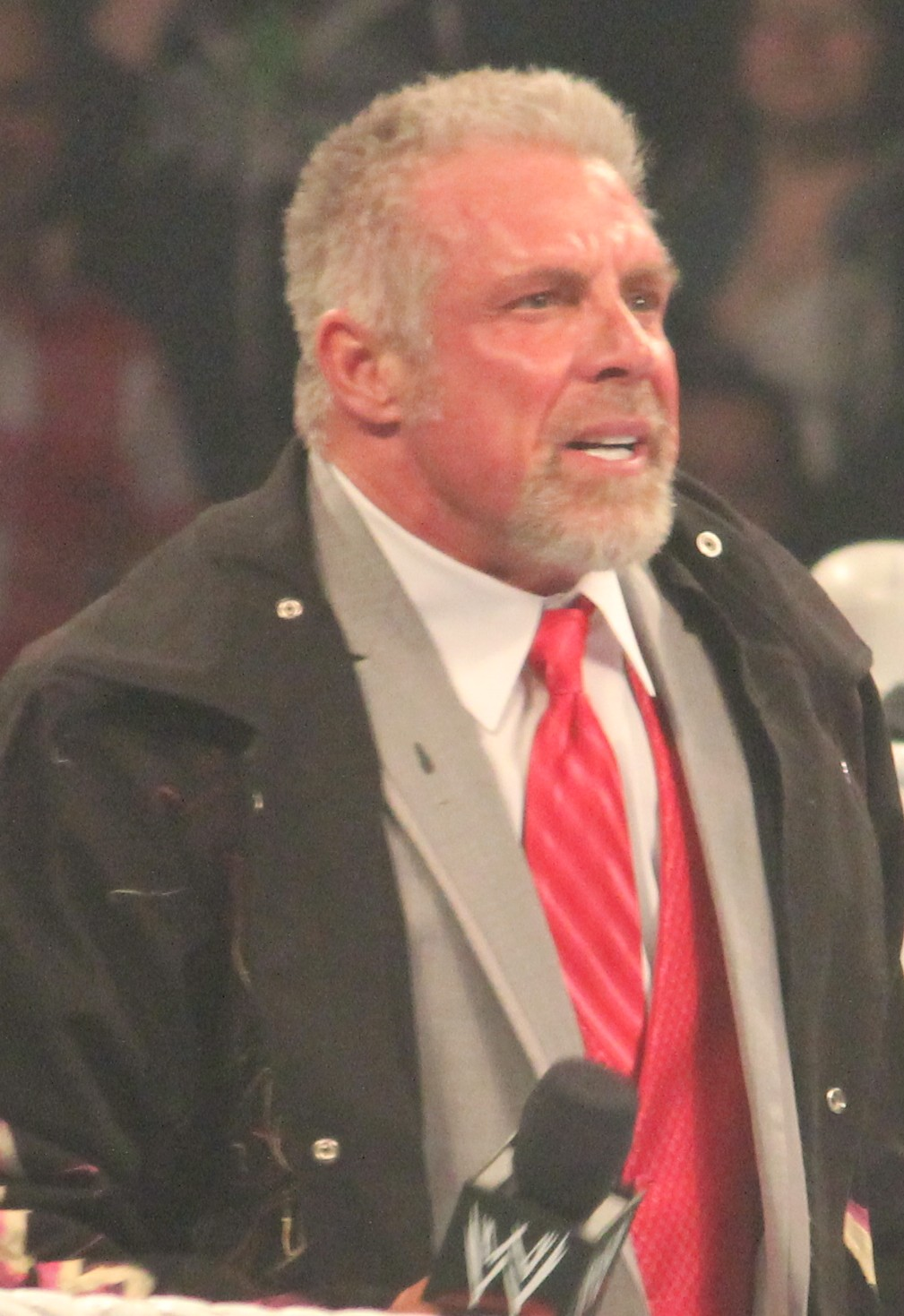
Ultimate Warrior was popularly billed as being from parts unknown; he was actually from Indiana.

A vague, fictional location. Billing a wrestler as being from "parts unknown" (rather than from their real hometown or another actual place) is intended to add to a wrestler's mystique. In some territories, the phrase commonly was applied to masked wrestlers. In the post-kayfabe era, it is used less and less, and usually with a certain air of levity. Sometimes, wrestlers can hail from other similarly abstract places, for example Stardust being billed from "the fifth dimension", Damien Demento being billed from "the outer reaches of your mind", or Danhausen being billed from "some place far away", or may have their location simply omitted from introductions, such as in the cases of Big Show and Braun Strowman.
payoff
The culmination of an angle or storyline with the intention of providing gratification for the fans. Typically involves a face finally overcoming a dominant heel.
phantom title change
An occasion when a wrestler is announced as having won a championship from another wrestler in a match which did not actually occur, often due to the previous champion having left the promotion. In the era of territories, non-existent title matches were often said to have taken place in a different part of the country.
Philly pop
The act of a promotion bringing in a former Extreme Championship Wrestling wrestler when in Philadelphia.
Pillmanize
The act of "breaking" an opponent's ankle, arm, or neck by placing it between the seat and headrest of a steel chair and then stepping or jumping on the chair or striking it with a second object. Named for Brian Pillman, who suffered a severe ankle injury (in kayfabe) when attacked in this manner by Stone Cold Steve Austin.
pinfall
Holding a wrestler's shoulders to the mat for a three count, to win a fall.
pipe bomb
A worked shoot promo where the wrestler giving the promo appears to break kayfabe and touches on real-life topics that are considered taboo, such as backstage politics or issues which are not typically addressed in storylines due to bad publicity. This was a term first used by CM Punk.
plant
A wrestler, stagehand, or paid actor who poses as a fan, usually seated in the front row of an event. Plants are often victimized or attacked by heel wrestlers in order to gain heat, or are used to participate in matches or storylines after being "randomly selected" from the crowd. Notable examples of plants were the WWE debut of Santino Marella, who won the Intercontinental Championship after being picked out of the crowd, or at WrestleMania 34 when Braun Strowman picked a 10-year-old boy named Nicholas (the son of referee John Cone) out of the crowd to be his tag team partner. (They would defeat Cesaro and Sheamus to win the Raw Tag Team Championship).
poaching
The act of luring away key talent from one company to another, usually with offers of higher pay. It is sometimes done deliberately to weaken a company by taking away their top draws. Poaching is typically done by larger companies. A more extreme form of poaching, wherein multiple wrestlers from a company are lured away, is referred to as raiding.
policeman
police woman

A wrestler, often a respected or feared shooter or street fighter, responsible for enforcing the promoter's will against recalcitrant wrestlers by performing unscripted or painful moves within a match, punishing or intimidating them for defying the management. In today's industry it is largely outdated because such tactics are illegal if they can be proven. Typically, it is only still used by dirt sheets and outside commentators who believe one wrestler is deliberately placed in matches against more dangerous opponents and injured deliberately after disagreements with management. While allegations of this sort persist, including being made by wrestlers themselves, few have been proven. Also describes a wrestler who keeps order in the locker room by threats of physical force.
pop
A cheer or positive reaction from the crowd.
popcorn match
Originally described a post-intermission match viewed as not important enough to keep fans from trips to the concession stands. Now describes a more lighthearted match designed to provide relief of dramatic tension.
potato
A strike to the head which makes real contact. A wrestler who endures one or more potatoes is likely to potato the perpetrator back, which is known as a receipt.
potato-sacking

A wrestler will make themselves dead weight, to prevent their opponent from lifting them up for a move. Though usually planned in a match, it can also be deliberately done by a wrestler who does not want to be lifted for a move, which can make the move harder to be properly executed and can cause a higher risk of injury to either one of the wrestlers.
powdering
The act of forcefully exiting the ring.
pre-show

A free television program aired prior to a pay-per-view event (usually carried via outlets such as television provider barker channels, live streaming on a promotion's website or social media platforms, or on a promotion's normal television outlet). It functions similarly to pre-game shows in televised sports, containing previews and analysis of the pay-per-view's matches, and recaps of the storylines that led up to the event. They may also include one or more preliminary undercard matches.
program
A series of matches in which the same wrestlers face each other, usually due to the two being scripted in a feud.
promo

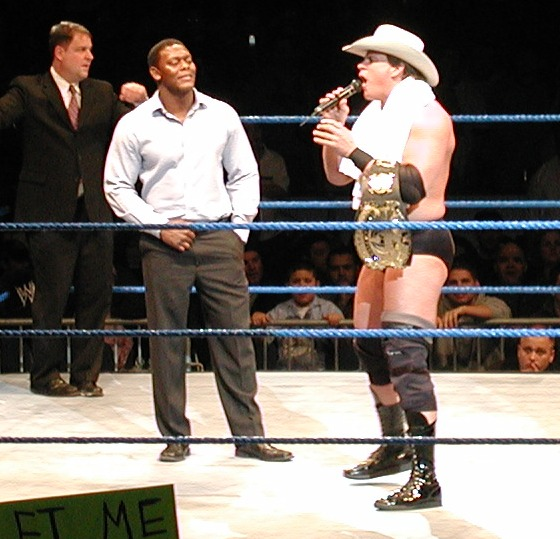
John "Bradshaw" Layfield (right) cutting a promo

An in-character interview or monologue. Often includes either an in-ring or backstage interview or some other type of skit by wrestlers and other performers to advance a storyline or feud. The act of performing a promo is referred to as "cutting", as in "cutting a promo". When the promo is aimed at a specific opponent (which can be an individual, tag team, stable, or faction), it is said to be cut "on" the target. A promo is an essential part of any wrestling show and is named as such as it is meant to "promote" an upcoming show or a future segment on the current show.
protected
An aspect of the business which is consciously presented in a way that will make it look as strong and credible as possible. Wrestlers can be protected by booking them in a way which emphasizes their strengths and hides their weaknesses as a performer, while a move can be protected by having opponents sell strongly and rarely kick out.
pull apart
A brawl so vicious that the combatants need to be pulled apart by others.
pure wrestling
See technical wrestling.
puroresu
In the strict sense, a style of Japanese professional wrestling popularized by promotions like All Japan Pro Wrestling and New Japan Pro Wrestling. Also broadly used to refer to all Japanese professional wrestling. The term can be transliterated as "pro-wres".
push
The worked rising of a wrestler's status in the eyes of the fans. Compare burial
put over
The act of one wrestler helping to boost the status of another, most often by losing a match or by selling their opponent as a credible threat.

== R ==
rasslin'

Originally, along with "grunt-and-groan", used by the mainstream media when presenting a derisive story on professional wrestling, which often stereotyped the participants and audience. Now refers to a style of wrestling popular in the Mid-South region of Tennessee, Mississippi, and Arkansas (primary city is Memphis, Tennessee), which emphasizes kayfabe and stiffness, generally with fewer squash matches and longer feuds, henceforth Memphis Style (since it is different from the Carolinas (Jim Crockett) or Georgia styles.
receipt
A term for returning a particularly stiff move back to a wrestler. This is usually done when one wrestler is being legitimately hit by his/her opponent's blows, and the wrestler being hit will send a legitimate move or hit back to the opponent as a wordless reminder to not hit so hard. Can also be used to refer to other aspects of the wrestling presentation, such as going into business for him/herself in a promo.
ref bump
A scenario where the referee of the match takes a bump and is removed from the match due to being (in kayfabe) knocked out, temporarily or permanently. This usually occurs to allow a storyline to progress (such as a run-in by a third party or turn by a second).
rematch clause

When a champion loses their title to another, this may be invoked as a storyline plot device to procure a title rematch in the near future (often the next pay-per-view event) in order to continue a feud. In recent years, this clause has often been explicitly ignored in storylines.
repackage
To give a wrestler a new gimmick.
rest hold

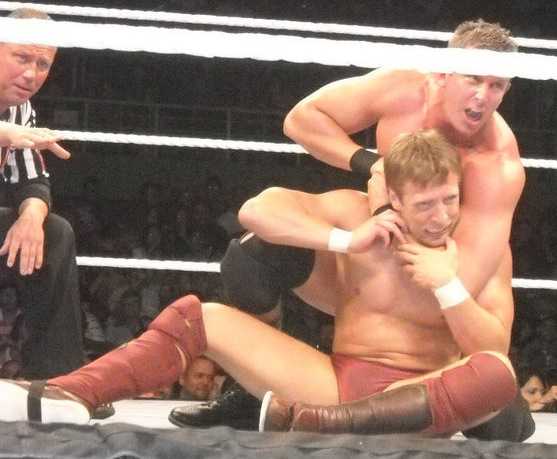
Ted DiBiase Jr. performing a rest hold on Daniel Bryan

A loose hold applied during a match, during which wrestlers catch their breath or plan the next series of spots together.
rib
A practical joke played by or on a wrestler.
ring general
An experienced wrestler who knows how to work a match to its full potential.
ring psychology
The process of wrestling a match in such a way that the crowd becomes emotionally involved. Performing an engaging match requires acting skills and a good grasp of dramatic timing. The tenets of "good psychology" can vary greatly between different regions & time periods due to changes in the audience's culture & expectations, so it is frequently a hot-button discussion topic.
ring rat
Similar to a groupie, one who frequents wrestling events to pursue sex with wrestlers.
ring rust
A detriment to wrestling ability resulting from lack of practice during a hiatus.
Road Warrior Pop
A loud roar of approval that a wrestler receives from the fans when making their entrance to the ring, in reference to popular tag team the Road Warriors, also known as Legion of Doom.
rope break
A break of the pin count or submission when a wrestler has his hands or feet on the rope or under the rope.
rub
Helping a less popular wrestler get over by associating them with a more prominent or popular wrestler. An example of this being when The Hurricane won against The Rock during a time in which The Rock was one of the highest ranking wrestlers, while The Hurricane was a mid-carder.
rubber match
An exchange of a win and a loss between two wrestlers feuding with each other at two to three different major wrestling shows.
rulebreaker
A wrestler whom Pro Wrestling Illustrated referred to a heel as in its early years of circulation.
run-in

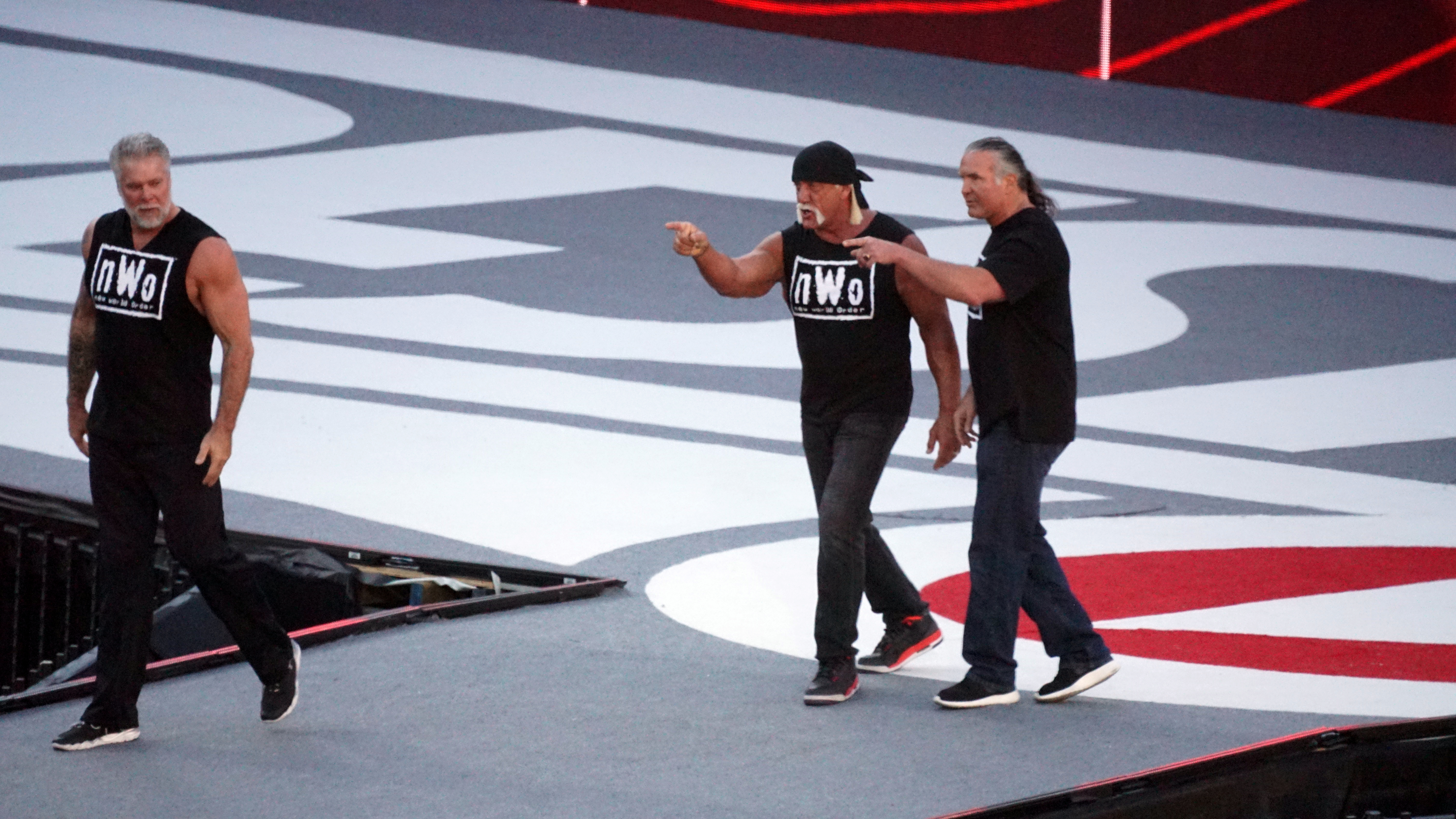
The nWo performing a run-in during WrestleMania 31

The unexpected entry of a new wrestler(s) or returning wrestler in a match already in progress. Run-ins are usually made by heels, typically to further a feud with a face. This is usually done with a beat down. Sometimes a face will do a run-in to protect another face from a heel who is cheating or overly punishing the weaker opponent, often beginning a feud.
rushed finish

A match finish which occurs sooner (and often differently) than planned. It is used when a wrestler is legitimately injured and cannot continue as planned, when the match is approaching its time limit (or a television segment is running long), or after a botch significantly changes the plot of the match. The term "audible" is also used, referring to the finish being known to happen upon verbal instruction from outside the ring.

== S ==
sandbag

To sabotage a throw by letting one's body go limp instead of cooperating, which makes the throw much harder, if not impossible, to execute. This move is typically done deliberately to make the attacker appear weak or unskilled, but can also be the result of a botch. Sandbagging can be dangerous, as many moves require specific actions by the target to lower the risk of injury.
schmoz/schmozz
A match that ends in chaos rather than in a decisive finish, usually due to a number of wrestlers not involved in the match running in and preventing a clean finish, often designed to end a match or angle.
school
A facility where professional wrestlers are trained, such as Dory Funk Jr's Funking Conservatory, Larry Sharpe's Monster Factory, the WCW Power Plant, or the WWE Performance Center.
scientific wrestler
1. Alternative term for a technician.
2. Term used by Pro Wrestling Illustrated and its sister publications to refer to a babyface as in their early years of circulation, when most heels worked in a brawling rather than technical style. Later replaced with "fan favorite" as technical heels (and brawling babyfaces) became more commonplace.
screwjob
An unfair and controversial finish, often involving cheating or outside interference. A worked screwjob is part of the story and is used to generate heat or sympathy while allowing a popular babyface to lose without losing credibility. A shoot screwjob occurs when the finish is changed without informing the losing wrestler. Two famous instances of this were the manner in which The Fabulous Moolah took the WWF Women's Championship from Wendi Richter in October 1985 and the Montreal Screwjob at the 1997 Survivor Series, when Shawn Michaels won the WWF Championship from Bret Hart after Vince McMahon ordered referee Earl Hebner to ring the bell.

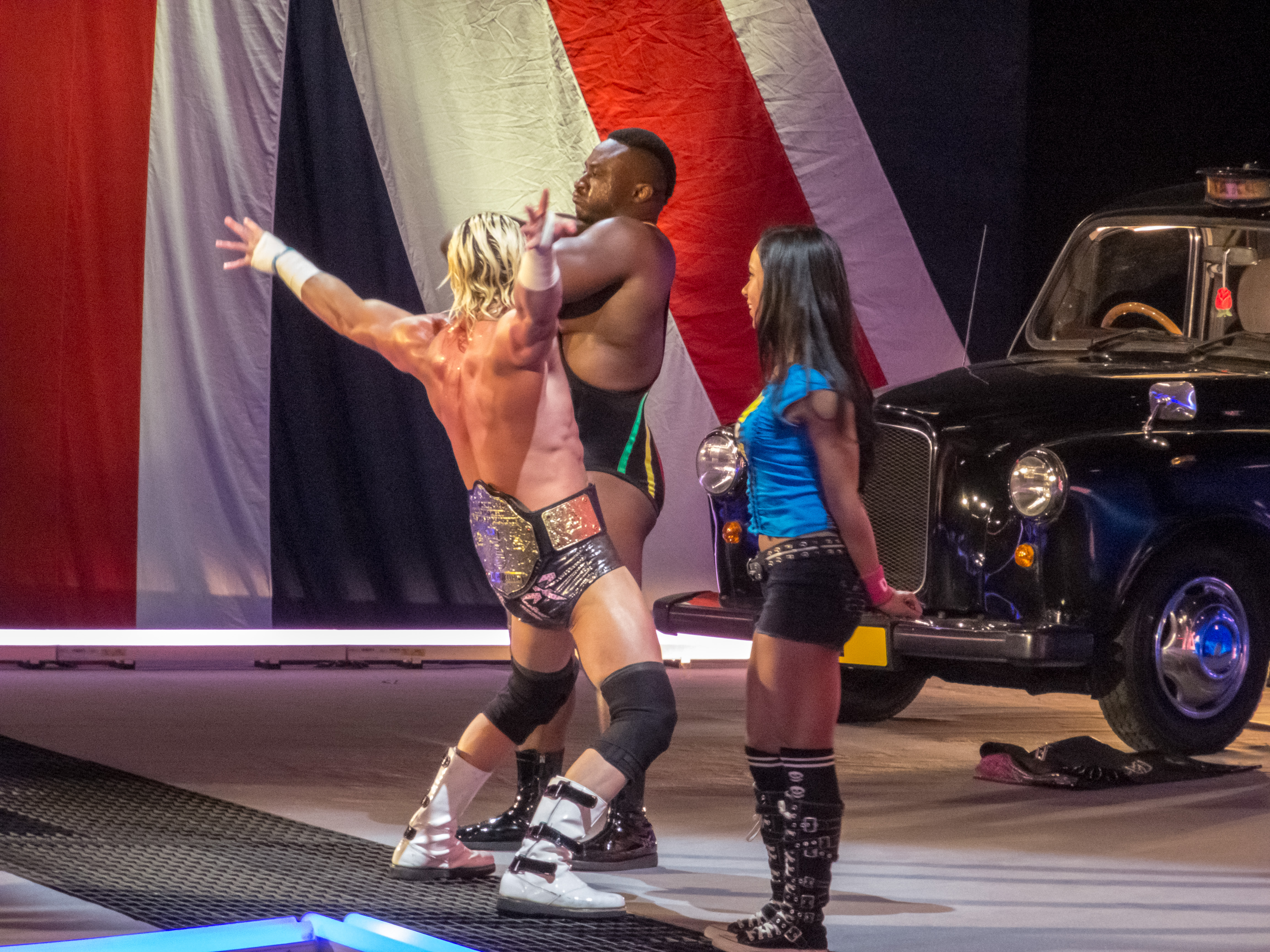
Dolph Ziggler (with title belt) accompanied by a valet (AJ Lee) and an enforcer (Big E Langston) as seconds.

second
A person accompanying, or "seconding", a wrestler to a match. Typically a manager, valet, enforcer, tag team partner or stablemate, the second is typically listed on the card alongside the wrestler they are supporting. In old school European wrestling, seconds with towels and water service each side as in boxing. They are considered neutral regardless of which corner they serve.
sell
To react to something in a way which makes it appear believable and legitimate to the audience. Typically refers to the physical action by a wrestler of making an opponent's moves look impactful, but it can be used to refer to any aspect of the worked presentation, notably including commentator reactions. Compare no-sell and over-sell.
shine
The initial stage of a standard wrestling match formula, in which the face dominates with their offence and makes the heel appear inferior in skill. Followed by the cutoff.
shitcan
To forcefully throw a wrestler from inside the ring to the floor outside through the ropes.
shoot
When a wrestler or personality deliberately goes off-script, either by making candid comments or remarks during an interview, breaking kayfabe, or legitimately attacking an opponent.
stooge
Territory term for a member of the locker-room who uses other wrestlers' trust in them to listen in on gossip and act as an informant for the office.
shoot style
A style of professional wrestling that originates in Japan. Shoot style wrestling employs stiff strikes, realistic submission holds, and occasionally a round system or other specific rules and ways to win in an attempt to give professional wrestling a legitimate sports-like feel. Satoru Sayama and Akira Maeda in the UWF and Nobuhiko Takada in the UWFi popularized the style.
signature move
A move a wrestler regularly performs, for which the wrestler is well known. Also, a term used for a special move done before their finisher.
slow burn
A storyline that develops over a long period. An example of this is Batista turning on Triple H in 2005 before WrestleMania 21.
smark
Short for "smart mark". Someone who has inside knowledge of the wrestling business, but is not speaking from their own personal experience with the business and has typically obtained that knowledge through dirt sheets. Often used as a term of derision for know-it-all fans.
smart
Having inside knowledge of the wrestling business. Originally used to refer to those who were aware of the existence of kayfabe and the scripted nature of professional wrestling. The act of teaching someone inside knowledge of the wrestling business is referred to as "smartening up" someone.
snug
To apply real pressure to a hold, either to make it appear more realistic to the audience, or to exact supremacy or revenge over an opponent. Compare stiff.
sports entertainment
The term WWE uses to describe both its own product and professional wrestling as a whole. It was first used by the promotion in the 1980s and is intended to acknowledge wrestling's roots in competitive sport and dramatic theater.
spot
Any planned action or series of actions in a match. Variations include the highspot, comeback spot, hope spot, and take-home spot. Compare missed spot.
spotfest
A match which consists mainly or entirely of pre-planned spots, normally with little flow and no logical transitions between moves and with little or no storytelling. Often used as a derisory term for matches which are seen to prioritize high-impact stunts over ring psychology.
spotmonkey
Derogatory term used to denote a wrestler who is believed to rely heavily on highspots in order to mask a lack of basic wrestling ability.
spot show
A term, dating from the territory era, referring to a wrestling show held in a town that does not regularly hold such events.
squared circle
The wrestling ring.
squash
An extremely one-sided match. Sometimes called a Tomato can match. Squashes generally feature star wrestlers or wrestlers receiving a push quickly and easily defeating jobbers, usually to help get a gimmick or moveset over.
stable

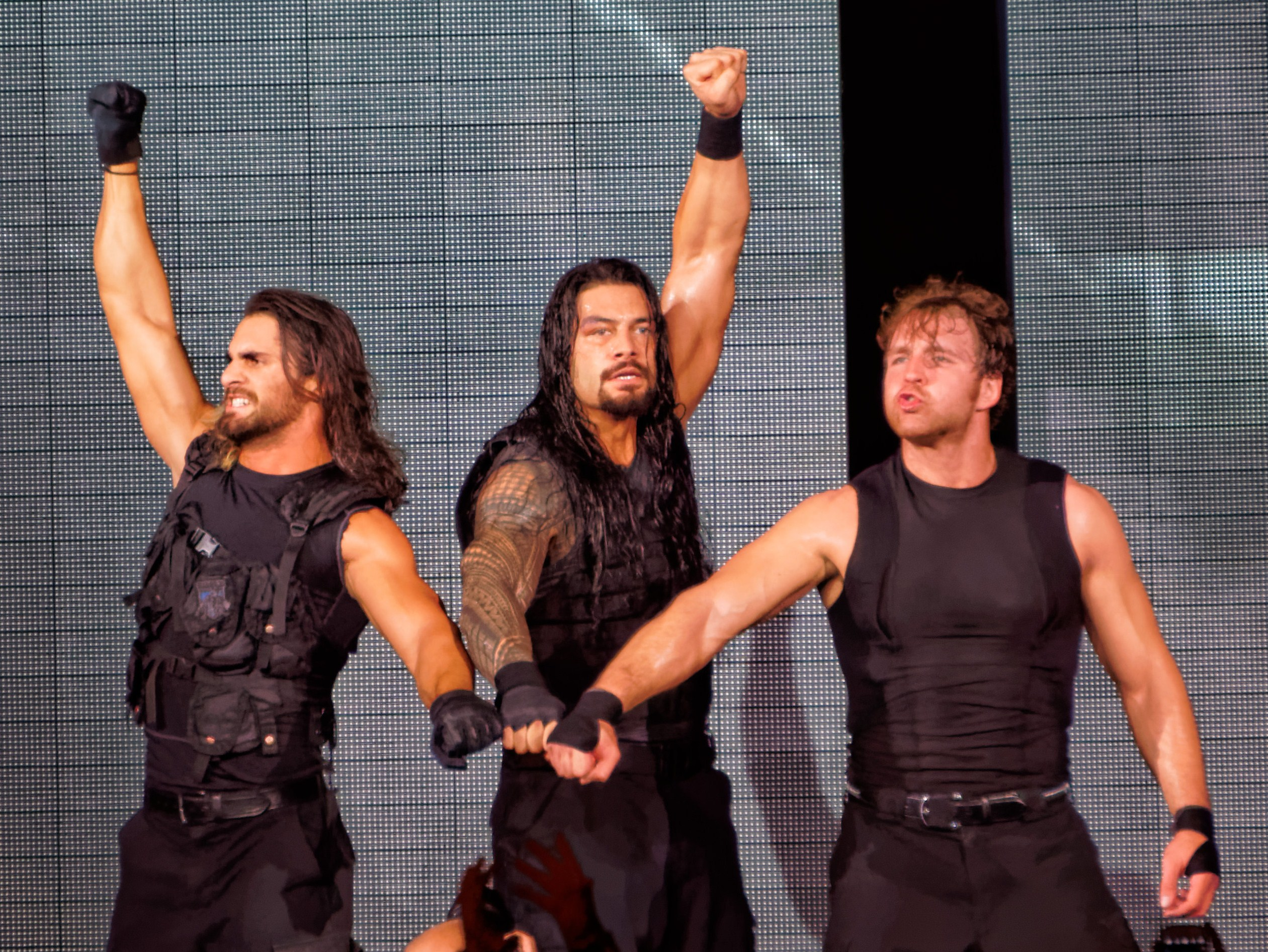
Stables can vary in size and form, from three-man units like The Shield (pictured) who feature similar outfits, to large groups with varying membership such as The Heenan Family.

A team of three or more wrestlers, usually heels, who generally share common motives, allies and adversaries within a storyline (or through multiple storylines) and are often presented as having the same or very similar gimmicks. Stables sometimes have several members partake in more separate activities, such as Owen Hart and the British Bulldog having their own tag team while also being part of the larger Hart Foundation. This is also rather common in Japanese promotions, where large stables (such as Chaos and Bullet Club) will also have various teams and sub-groups within them. A stable differs from a faction in that a stable consists of wrestlers who share a common leader, for example as a manager or valet, who directs the wrestlers and speaks for them.
stick
A microphone ("the stick"), used to deliver a promo.
stiff
Using excessive force when executing a move, deliberately or accidentally, thus causing the opponent increased legitimate pain. An example of stiffing was Ultimate Warrior, who was known for stiffing wrestlers and being unsafe to work with.
Sting money
A term from the 1990s used to refer to a lucrative contract, such as the one held by Sting in World Championship Wrestling.
strap
A championship belt.
stretching
The act of causing physical harm to prospective professional wrestlers, usually by the means of submission holds. In the kayfabe period, this served to protect the wrestling business from accusations of "being fake", to instill humility in newer members of the locker room, and it helped to weed out those who could not take punishment. A professional wrestling trainer notable for "stretching" his recruits was Stu Hart, in the infamous Hart Dungeon. Other wrestlers in various territories who were used to test potential newcomers were Danny Hodge, Bob Roop, and "Dr. Death" Steve Williams.
strike
1. Any contact made by one wrestler to their opponent (e.g., punches, kicks, chops, etc.).
2. A violation of WWE's wellness policy, with three strikes in an 18-month period resulting in a wrestler being released from the promotion.
strong style
A Japanese-inspired professional wrestling style that is worked, yet aims to deliver realistic performances, through stiff martial arts strikes and worked shoots.
super finisher
A move rarely used by a wrestler, but one that almost always ends a match. Some notable examples include Randy Orton's Punt Kick and Kenta Kobashi's Burning Hammer. Kenny Omega's One Winged Angel is also an example of a very protected finisher with his often tag-team partner Kota Ibushi being the only person known to have kicked-out of the move.
Superstar
WWE's term for wrestlers on their roster.
swerve
A sudden change in the direction of a storyline to surprise the fans. Often, it involves one wrestler turning on an ally in order to join a supposed mutual enemy. Swerves frequently start feuds between the former allies. This also refers to when a booker leads fans to believe that something is going to happen (or someone could appear) at a show, before doing something entirely different.

== T ==
tease
To indicate a turn. A face teases a heel turn if they start exhibiting heel behaviors and a heel indicates a face turn if they start exhibiting face behaviors or fall victim to the misdeeds of a more nefarious heel.
technical wrestling
A style of wrestling focused more on holds, takedowns, submissions, and grappling.
technician
A wrestler who employs or masters so called technical wrestling style. Bret Hart is a commonly cited example of a great technical wrestler.
territory
A geographic area with its own wrestling product, management, and insular kayfabe. the "territory era" refers to the system that the wrestling industry widely operated by up until WWF's national expansion in the mid-1980s, in which regions were treated independently from one another under the auspices of different promotions. Sometimes used coyly in more modern times to refer to a transition between different companies.
Titan Towers
A nickname for WWE's former corporate head office in Stamford, Connecticut.
TitanTron

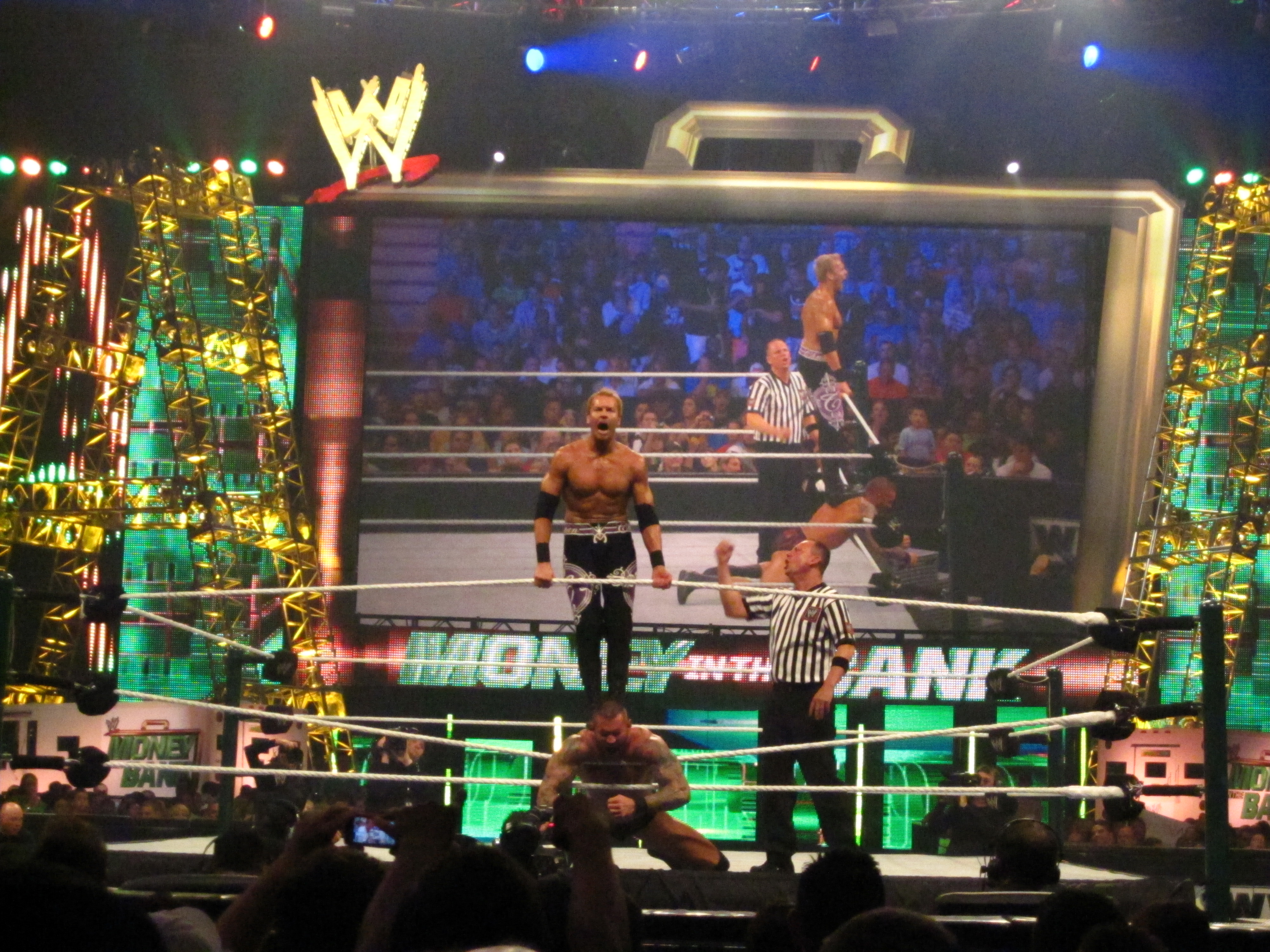
The TitanTron (background) at Money in the Bank in July 2011

A video screen above the entrance stage area, used for showing entrance videos, backstage segments, promos, and the match-in-progress for audience members seated too far back from the ring. A play on the name of Sony's JumboTron and Titan Sports, the then-parent company of the World Wrestling Federation (WWF), the TitanTron was introduced as part of WWF's Raw set in the late-1990s. The concept has since been adapted by other major promotions, such as World Championship Wrestling, which used the TurnerTron (which was sometimes called NitroVision).
trainer
An individual who trains someone as a professional wrestler, generally a former or current wrestler themselves.
transitional champion
A short-reigning champion who serves to move the title indirectly from one wrestler to a third. They are usually used when the title is to be moved between two faces, to avoid requiring them to wrestle each other (to avoid burying one, to save the match up for a bigger show, or, more rarely, when the wrestlers refuse to work with each other).
turn
A switch in alignment of a wrestler's character. Turns involve a wrestler going from face to heel or vice versa. There are two types of turns, the hard turn (which occurs quickly and acts as a surprise device) and the soft turn (a gradual shift in character). Transitioning from a face into a heel is called a 'heel turn' and the opposite is called a 'face turn'.
tweener
A morally ambiguous wrestler who is neither a face nor heel (an in-betweener), also sometimes describes a heel who is usually cheered or a face who is usually jeered, especially when two faces or two heels face each other. See also antihero.
twin switch
Popularised by Dave and Earl Hebner and later by The Bella Twins, it involves the assigned competitor in a match covertly swapping places with their identical twin sibling, typically out of sight of the referee and spectators. A common variation is the "under-the-ring switch," whereby the competing twin slides underneath the ring apron. The unassigned twin then emerges, which causes confusion among all involved, but eventually acts like it's the same assigned contestant. This switch is usually short-lived and ends when it is revealed that both twins have participated in the match.

== U ==
Unified
The state of two or more championships when merged by one champion.

== V ==
vacant
The state of a championship not held by any wrestlers. Often occurs due to the current champion suffering a legitimate injury, illness, or suspension preventing them from defending the title for an extended period, them being a free agent or leaving a promotion, a controversial or indeterminate finish to a match, by a decision made by an authority figure, or as part of a planned storyline to facilitate a new champion or program. Often times in the event of a vacancy a match or tournament is held to determine a new champion, or an authority figure awards the belt to another wrestler.
valet
A person, usually female, who accompanies a performer, usually male, to the ring. Usually serves to titillate or agitate the crowd, to interfere in the match, or serve as eye candy for mature viewers. The latter purpose began to emerge in the late 1990's and became highly prevalent in major promotions from the early 2000's to the mid 2010's.
vanilla midget
A derogatory term created by Kevin Nash to describe wrestlers who are good in-ring workers, but believed to be too small and generic/bland to ever succeed on a large stage.
vignette
Any piece of video footage featuring characters or events which is shown to the audience for the purposes of entertainment or edification. Usually meant to introduce a debuting character, to get a wrestler over before their TV wrestling debut or to signify an impending return.
visual fall
A pinfall that the referee does not see, but the crowd does. It is usually followed by a late kick-out when the referee eventually sees the pinfall and starts counting. It is used to heighten the drama of a match by showing that the pinning wrestler had done enough to win by pinfall.

== W ==
work
1. (noun): Anything planned to happen, or a "rationalized lie". The opposite of shoot.
2. (verb): To methodically attack a single body part over the course of a match or an entire angle, setting up an appropriate finisher.
3. (verb): To deceive or manipulate an audience in order to elicit a desired response.
worked shoot
The phenomenon of a wrestler seemingly going "off script", often revealing elements of out-of-universe reality, but actually doing so as a fully planned part of the show. A notable example of a worked shoot is CM Punk's pipebomb promo on the June 27, 2011, episode of Monday Night Raw.
worker
1. Another term for professional wrestler. Often used in the context of describing in-ring skill level (e.g., "He is a good/bad worker"), or when contrasting a wrestler primarily known for their in-ring abilities with others better known for their size or personality (e.g., "He is the worker of the group").
2. Alternatively, used to further delineate in-ring ability itself by referring to someone's aptitude at working as opposed to simply wrestling. i.e. The art of manipulating crowds, performing convincing-looking offence harmlessly, "getting the most out of the least", etc.. Essentially an evaluation of one's grasp of ring psychology, as opposed to athletic acumen or knowledge of holds & moves. (e.g., "He's not much of a wrestler, but is one hell of a worker").
workrate
The in-ring performance level a wrestler puts into their matches, judged by a combination of skill and effort. A wrestler considered talented in the ring has a "high workrate".
wrestler's court
A term used often to describe kangaroo courts held backstage with a congregation of wrestlers; this is often used to settle backstage disputes and transgressions between performers and (sometimes) staff such as writers. In WWE, The Undertaker is known as being the "judge, jury, and executioner" and JBL the "prosecuting attorney" of wrestler's court during their full-time tenures in the company. Punishments for those found "guilty" often included the purchase of the night's alcohol or rental cars.
write off

To book an angle and/or match so as to explain in kayfabe a wrestler's upcoming (and usually inconvenient) absence, usually in the form of being "injured".

== X ==
X division
A high-flying, high-risk, fast-paced style of professional wrestling which was originated in Total Nonstop Action Wrestling (TNA). Rather than emphasizing the fact that most wrestlers who perform this style are under 220 lb (100 kg) by calling it a cruiserweight division, they decided to emphasize the high-risk nature of the moves that these wrestlers perform, removing all restraints placed on its wrestlers, and allowing them to perform almost stunt-like wrestling moves.
X signal
A signal used by referees during a match to indicate that a wrestler is unable to continue and may need medical attention. The referee will cross their arms and, if necessary, point to the injured wrestler. Since many fans are aware of the significance of the signal, and with referees often now having direct communication with producers backstage, it is now sometimes used in kayfabe fashion, to sell a storyline injury.
X-Pac heat
When fans jeer at a wrestler because they dislike the wrestler personally as opposed to the character he or she plays in the ring. Named after Sean Waltman, known as X-Pac, who was believed to have "overstayed his welcome" by some fans, and so was jeered regardless of whether he was a face or heel character. Compare go away heat.

== Y ==
yarder
An amateur, usually untrained, performer who practices wrestling as a hobby in low-budget settings (like a backyard) rather than in a professional ring.
young boy

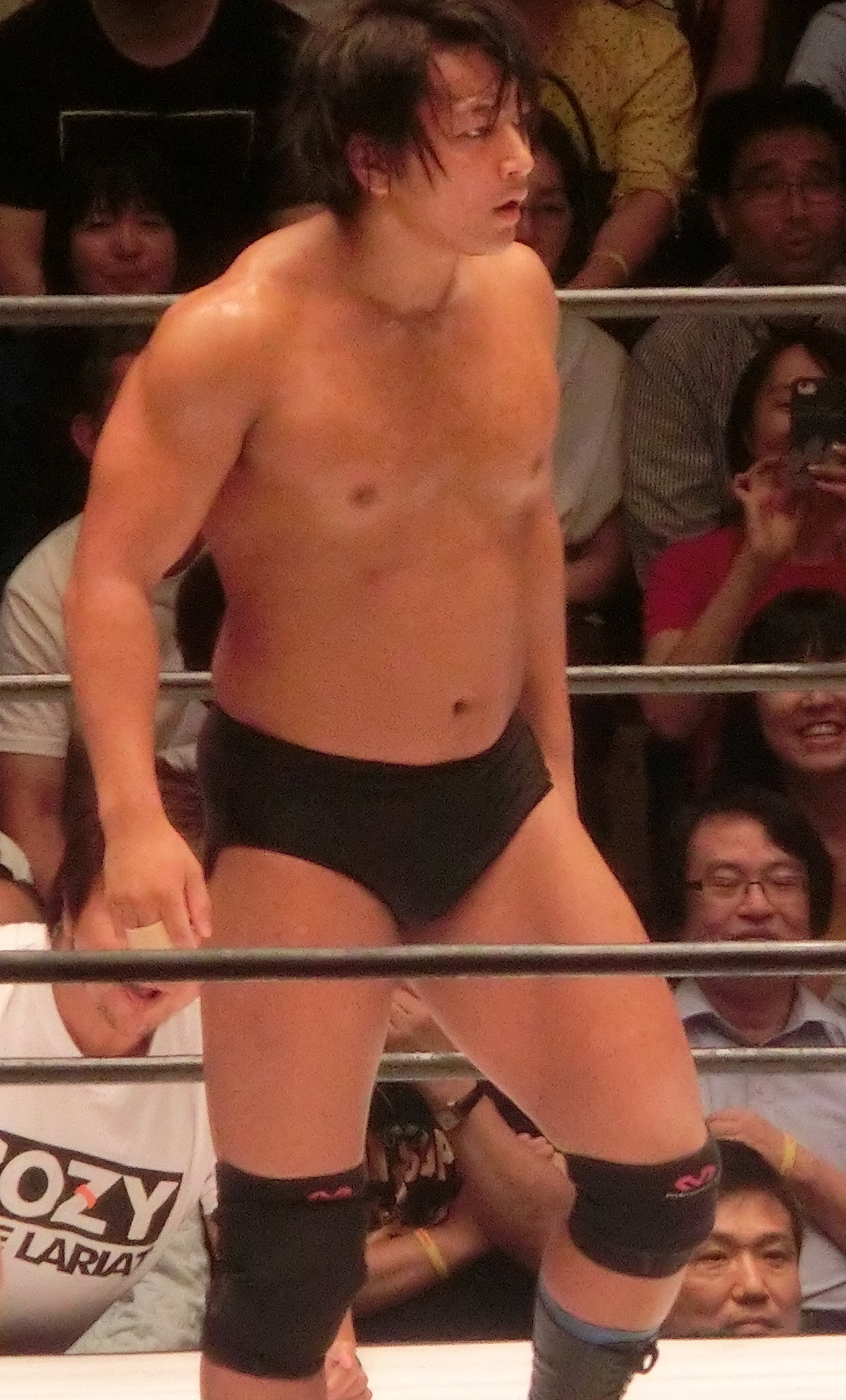
Shota Umino began his career as a young lion in New Japan Pro-Wrestling.

A rookie, particularly in Japanese professional wrestling. The term "young lion" is used for the trainees from the New Japan Pro-Wrestling dojo; although they usually perform at NJPW shows, typically on the lower card, they are also assigned other tasks such as security around the ring.

== Z ==
zabada
A fictional move that a foreign heel would claim to know to build intrigue in his matches. Fell out of use by the 1960s.
