= Harley Race Wrestling Arena =

Professional wrestling arena in Troy, Missouri

- Interactive map of Harley Race Wrestling Arena
- Location: 198 Cherry Blossom Way, Troy, Missouri 63379; United States
- Coordinates: 38.966468°N 90.965956°W
- Owner: World League Wrestling

Construction
- Opened: 2014

Tenant
- World League Wrestling (2014–present)

Website
- https://www.harleyrace.com/

The Harley Race Wrestling Arena is an arena located in Troy, Missouri and is primarily used for professional wrestling. The arena is currently home to Harley Race's Wrestling Academy and the World League Wrestling (WLW) professional wrestling promotion.

== History ==
In 1999, Harley Race founded World Legion Wrestling, (WLW), an independent professional wrestling promotion that integrates current and past students of the Harley Race Wrestling Academy. At first, their weekly television program aired on the America One Television Network, and added their show to the weekly line-up of a different wrestling promotion every night. After they lost their television contract, they changed their name to World League Wrestling, and continued promoting in the Missouri area. The academy was originally located in Eldon, Missouri, however, in 2014, WLW and Harley Race's Wrestling Academy relocated to the Harley Race Wrestling Arena, a purpose-built venue which would become the permanent home base for the promotion. Since 2014, the arena has been home to television tapings for the promotion's syndicated weekly television show along with other major events once per month.

On August 11, 2019, after the passing of Harley Race, the arena held a memorial service which was open to the public to attend.
