= World League Wrestling =

American professional wrestling promotion

- Current logo introduced in 2024
- Acronym: WLW
- Founded: 1999
- Headquarters: Troy, Missouri
- Founder(s): Harley Race; David Marquez
- Owner: Leland Race
- Formerly: World Legion Wrestling
- Website: www.harleyrace.com/worldleaguewrestling.html/

World League Wrestling (WLW), also known as NWA World League Wrestling, is a Troy, Missouri-based professional wrestling promotion affiliated with Harley Race's Wrestling Academy school. It was established in 1999 by former World Heavyweight Champion Harley Race. The promotion is part of the National Wrestling Alliance (NWA)'s territory system and holds shows once a month at the Harley Race Wrestling Arena in Troy, Missouri.

== History ==
=== Harley Race's Wrestling Academy ===
The Harley Race Wrestling Academy was operated by Harley Race. It provides training programs for those looking to enter the professional wrestling industry. The objective of the program is to "Teach safe wrestling technique, draw on Harley Race's experience and to give students tools to succeed in professional wrestling". Programs include both courses to become a professional wrestler, which requires anywhere between 300–500 hours of training, and professional wrestling referee training, which entails 60 hours of training. It is now called "Attack the Mat" Wrestling school and is operated by Leland Race.

The school has two wrestling rings and weight room. The school is attended mostly by men, but occasionally women join as well.

The school initially put on local wrestling events that raised money for local charities in Missouri. The wrestling school later began a running partnership with Pro Wrestling Noah that includes many of the program's talent touring with the Japanese-based wrestling promotion. YouTube celebrity OutlawDipper has stated in his previous videos that he attended this wrestling school and lived in Eldon, Missouri.

=== World League Wrestling ===
Logo of World League Wrestling used from 1999 to 2024

In 1999, Race began World Legion Wrestling, (WLW), an independent professional wrestling promotion that integrates current and past students of the Harley Race Wrestling Academy. At first they did television for the America One Television Network, and added their show to the weekly line-up of a different wrestling promotion every night at 11:00 p.m. eastern time. After they lost their TV, they changed their name to World League Wrestling, and continued promoting in the Missouri area. World League Wrestling is based out of Troy, Missouri, and puts on approximately 11 shows a year. The slogan for the company is Shut up and wrestle, which expresses its theme of more old-school wrestling and less "showboating". The promotion is family-style professional wrestling entertainment that excludes nudity and swearing. The shows also sometimes features guest wrestlers. The academy was located in Eldon, Missouri before moving to Troy, Missouri in early 2014. It has returned on tv on stations like KMIZ in Columbia Missouri and NUDU tv in Houston Texas.

On November 2, 2024, National Wrestling Alliance (NWA) announced World League Wrestling as part of NWA's territory, while also serving as NWA's developmental system.

On May 27, 2026, World League Wrestling announced thath they would be airing their weekly television program on KPLR-TV, the same station which aired Wrestling at the Chase.

== Current champions ==
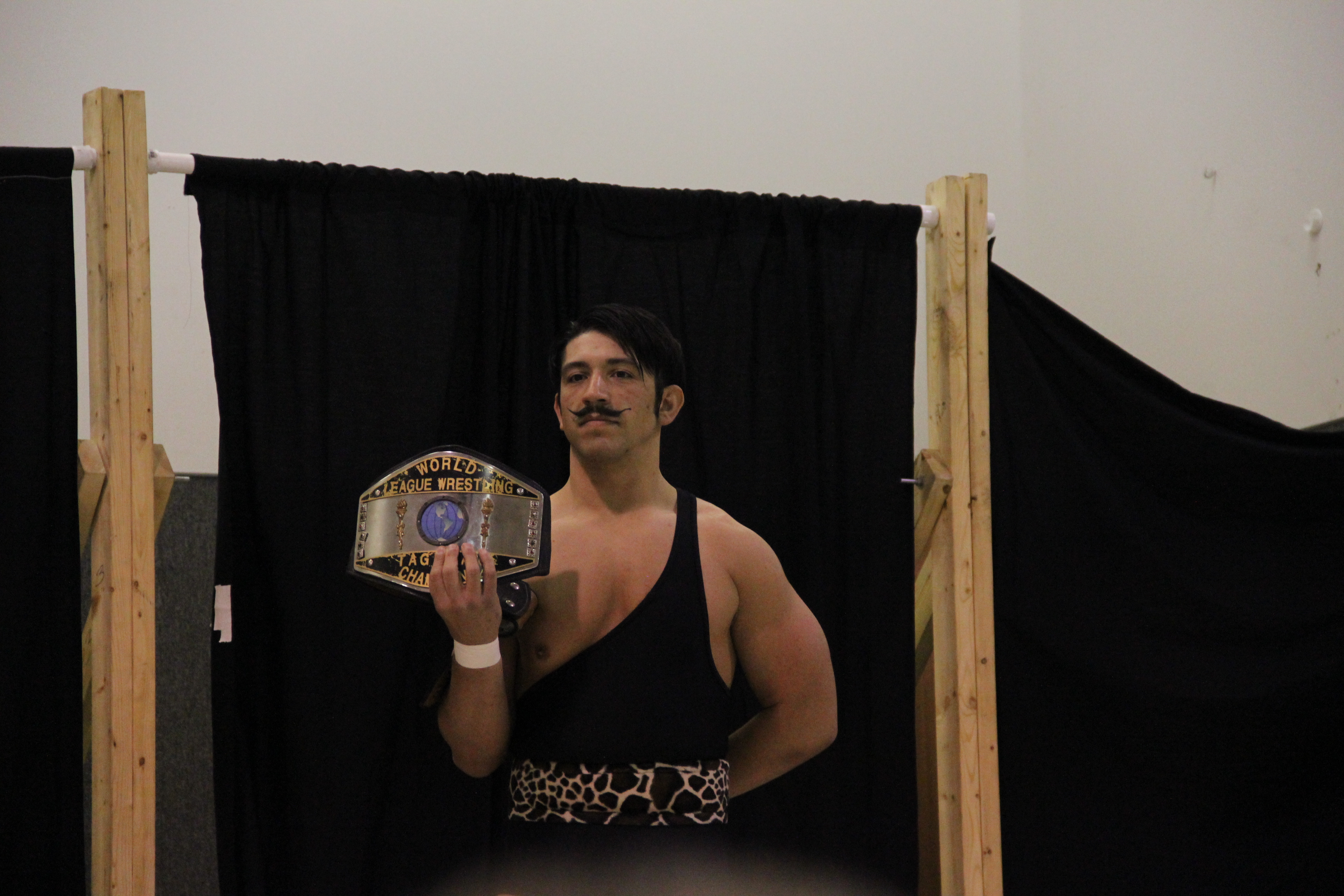
Ryan Drago in 2013 with the WLW Tag Team belt.

Championship	Champion(s)	Date Won
NWA WLW Heavyweight Championship	Carson Drake	June 7, 2025
NWA WLW Tag Team Championship	Blazin' Guns (Austin Mulitalo and Blade Lennox)	February 22, 2025
NWA WLW Ladies Championship	Skyler Sparks	November 2, 2024
NWA WLW Junior Heavyweight Championship	Chris Danger	November 8, 2026
