= WWE Hall of Fame (2016) =

WWE Hall of Fame induction ceremony

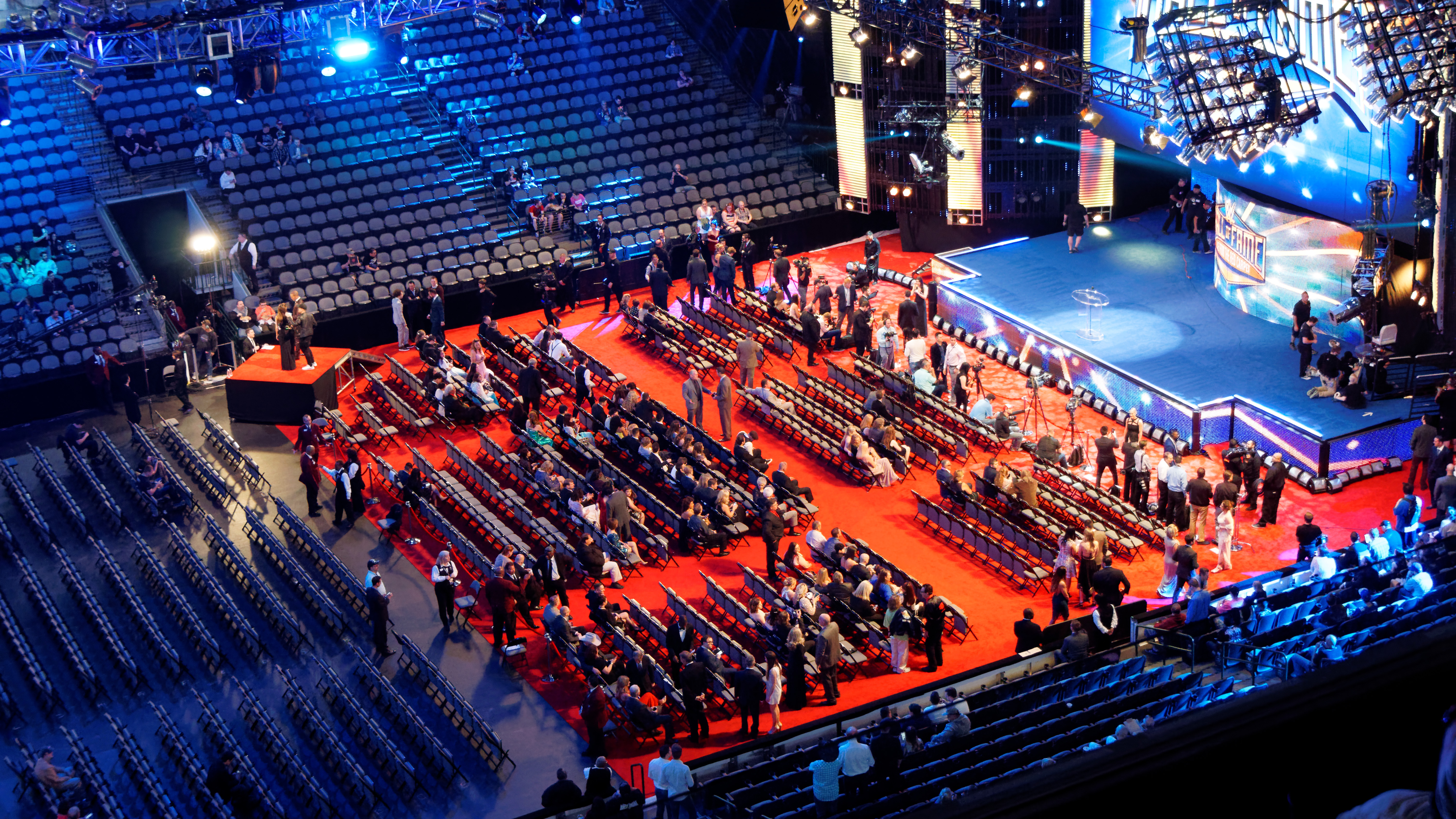
- The 2016 WWE Hall of Fame set
- Promotion: WWE
- Date: April 2, 2016
- City: Dallas, Texas
- Venue: American Airlines Center

WWE Hall of Fame chronology
← Previous; 2015	Next → 2017

WWE Hall of Fame (2016) was the event which featured the introduction of the 17th class to the WWE Hall of Fame. The event was produced by WWE on April 2, 2016, from the American Airlines Center in Dallas, Texas. The event took place the same weekend as WrestleMania 32. The event aired live on the WWE Network, and was hosted by Jerry Lawler. A condensed one-hour version of the ceremony aired the following Thursday on USA Network, after SmackDown.

== Event ==
Due to the launch of the WWE Network shortly before WrestleMania XXX, this event featured the third ever "Red Carpet" event as a one-hour pre-show prior to the start of the event. The pre-show was hosted by Michael Cole and Maria Menounos.

The Godfather was inducted by his long-term friend whom he often traveled the road with, the members of The Acolytes Protection Agency, John "Bradshaw" Layfield and Ron Simmons.

Stan Hansen was inducted by his overseas partner and rival Vader.

Jacqueline was inducted by The Dudley Boyz (Bubba Ray Dudley and D-Von Dudley).

In 2016, WWE introduced a new category for the Hall of Fame called the "Legacy" wing. Inductees under this new category feature wrestlers from the early years of professional wrestling, primarily during the early part of the 20th century. All inductees in 2016 are inducted posthumously and were recognized with a video package at the ceremony. Those inducted in the 2016 legacy category were Mildred Burke, Frank Gotch, George Hackenschmidt, Ed "Strangler" Lewis, Pat O'Connor, Lou Thesz and "Sailor" Art Thomas.

The Fabulous Freebirds were the group inductee into the Hall of Fame. Representing them were Michael Hayes, Terry Gordy (represented by his son, Ray Gordy), Buddy Roberts (represented by his son Buddy Roberts Jr.), Jimmy Garvin. The Freebirds were inducted by The New Day members Big E, Kofi Kingston, and Xavier Woods. Following their induction Hayes sang their song Badstreet U.S.A.

Big Boss Man was inducted by Slick. Due to his death in 2004, his induction was accepted by his wife Angela and his daughters Lacy and Megan.

Snoop Dogg was inducted by John Cena. Snoop Dogg spoke about what it was like growing up a fan of professional wrestling, and gave what an honor it is to see his cousin Sasha Banks now wrestling for WWE.

Following The Ultimate Warrior's death in April 2014, WWE introduced the Warrior Award, in 2015, for those who have "exhibited unwavering strength and perseverance, and who lives life with the courage and compassion that embodies the indomitable spirit of the Ultimate Warrior." Joan Lunden became the second recipient of The Warrior Award. The Ultimate Warrior's wife Dana inducted Lunden and spoke of her recent return to the public eye and openly discussing her breast cancer diagnosis in addition to becoming a spokeswoman for Susan G. Komen.

Sting was the final inductee and was inducted by Ric Flair. Flair went on to ramble much throughout his speech, focusing on himself rather than talk about Sting. Sting spoke about what a long journey it was to come to WWE, and how proud he was to finally be in WWE. Sting then announced that he wanted to retire in WWE and used the opportunity to officially announce his retirement. Despite this, Sting later debuted in rival promotion All Elite Wrestling (AEW) in late 2020, coming out of retirement, and competed in his first match in over five years at AEW's Revolution pay-per-view on March 7, 2021.

== Inductees ==
=== Individual ===
- Class headliners appear in **boldface**

Image	Ring name (Birth Name)	Inducted by	WWE recognized accolades
	**Sting** (Steve Borden)	Ric Flair	Six-time WCW World Heavyweight Champion; Two-time WCW International World Heavyweight Champion; Two-time NWA World Heavyweight Champion; Two-time WCW United States Heavyweight Champion; Three-time WCW World Tag Team Champion
	The Godfather (Charles Wright)	The Acolytes Protection Agency (John "Bradshaw" Layfield and Ron Simmons)	One-time WWF Intercontinental Champion; One-time WWF Tag Team Champion
	Big Boss Man (Ray Traylor Jr.)	Slick	Posthumous inductee: represented by his widow Angela and his daughters Lacy and Megan; Four-time WWF Hardcore Champion; One-time WWF Tag Team Champion
	Jacqueline (Jacqueline Moore)	The Dudley Boyz (Bubba Ray Dudley and D-Von Dudley)	Two-time WWF Women's Champion and the first African American WWF Women's Champion; One-time WWE Cruiserweight Champion (the only woman to win the title in WWE); The first African American woman to be inducted One-time UWF Women's World Champion; 14-time USWA Women's Champion
	Stan Hansen (John Hansen II)	Vader	One-time AWA World Heavyweight Champion; One-time NWA United States Heavyweight Champion

=== Group ===
Image	Group	Inducted by	WWE recognized accolades
	The Fabulous Freebirds	The New Day (Big E, Kofi Kingston, and Xavier Woods)	Six-time WCCW World Six-Man Tag Team Champions; Two-time WCW World Tag Team Champions; Two-time WCW United States Tag Team Champions; One-time WCW World Six-Man Tag Team Champions; Credited for creating the "Freebird Rule"
Michael Hayes (Michael Seitz) – One-time NWA United States Heavyweight Champion. Terry Gordy – Posthumous inductee: represented by his son Ray Gordy. One time NWA Americas Heavyweight Champion, one-time WCW World Tag Team Champion, one-time NWA World Tag Team Champion. Two-time Triple Crown Heavyweight Champion and seven-time World Tag Team Champion in All Japan Pro Wrestling. Buddy Roberts (Dale Hey) – Posthumous inductee: represented by his son Buddy Roberts Jr. One-time NWA Texas Heavyweight Champion, one-time WCCW Television Champion. Jimmy Garvin (James Williams) – Four-time NWA American Heavyweight Champion, one-time AWA World Tag Team Champion

=== Celebrity ===
Image	Recipient (Birth name)	Occupation	Inducted by	Appearances
	Snoop Dogg (Calvin Broadus Jr.)	Rapper	John Cena	Master of Ceremonies for the Playboy BunnyMania Lumberjill match at WrestleMania XXIV and accompanied Sasha Banks to the ring for her match at WrestleMania 32. Raw guest host in 2009 and guest star in 2015

=== Warrior Award ===
Image	Recipient (Birth name)	Presented By	Notes
	Joan Lunden (Joan Blunden)	Dana Warrior	Long-time former co-host of Good Morning America. Returned to the public eye in recent years for openly discussing her breast cancer diagnosis. Spokeswoman for Susan G. Komen for the Cure

=== Legacy ===
Image	Ring name (Birth name)	WWE recognized accolades
	Mildred Burke	One-time and first NWA World Women's Champion for almost twenty years from 1930 to 1950; Two-time Women's World Champion
	Frank Gotch	One-time World Heavyweight Wrestling Champion; Three-time American Heavyweight Champion
	George Hackenschmidt (Georg Hackenschmidt)	One-time European Greco-Roman Heavyweight Champion and first ever World Heavyweight Wrestling Champion
	Ed "Strangler" Lewis (Robert Friedrich)	Four-time World Heavyweight Champion; One-time holder of the Boston version of the AWA World Heavyweight Championship; One-time NWA Florida Heavyweight Champion
	Pat O'Connor	One-time NWA World Heavyweight Champion; Three-time NWA Central States United States Heavyweight Champion; One-time (and inaugural) AWA World Heavyweight Champion; One-time AWA World Tag Team Champion
	Lou Thesz (Aloysius Thesz)	One-time holder of the Boston version of the AWA World Heavyweight Championship; Two-time World Heavyweight Wrestling Champion; Three-time NWA World Heavyweight Champion
	"Sailor" Art Thomas	Billed by WWE as "one of sports-entertainment's first African-American stars", a frequent challenger for the NWA World Heavyweight Championship
