= Shawn Stasiak =

Canadian-American professional wrestler (born 1970)

Personal information
- Born: Shawn Emile Stipich; July 21, 1970 (age 56) Hayward, California, U.S.
- Education: Boise State University (BA); Parker University (DC)
- Family: Stan Stasiak (father)

Professional wrestling career
- Ring name(s): Meat; Shawn Stasiak; Planet Stasiak
- Billed height: 6 ft 4 in (193 cm)
- Billed weight: 250 lb (113 kg)
- Billed from: Hayward, California (as Meat) "Planet Stasiak" (as Shawn Stasiak)
- Trained by: Dory Funk Jr. Tom Prichard; WCW Power Plant; Paul Orndorff
- Debut: 1996
- Retired: 2010

Shawn Emile Stipich (born July 21, 1970) is an American retired professional wrestler. He is best known for his appearances with the professional wrestling promotions the World Wrestling Federation/World Wrestling Entertainment and World Championship Wrestling in the late 1990s and early 2000s under the ring names Shawn Stasiak and Meat. Championships held by Stasiak over the course of his career include the WCW World Tag Team Championship and WWF Hardcore Championship. Stasiak is the son of former WWWF Champion Stan Stasiak.

== Early life ==
Though born in Hayward, California, much of the early years of Stasiak's life were spent on the road, traveling from territory to territory with his dad, before the family eventually returned to Canada and settled in Oakville, Ontario, near Toronto. He attended White Oaks Secondary School, where he wrestled in Ontario Federation of School Athletic Associations events. After graduating, he attended Boise State University, where he graduated with a Bachelor of Arts in communications. During his studies, Stipich made it to second place in the Pacific-10 Conference in two consecutive years.

== Professional wrestling career ==
=== Early career (1996–1998) ===
Stipich trained as a professional wrestler under Dory Funk Jr. at Funking Conservatory, debuting in 1996 under the ring name "Shawn Stasiak" for the Vancouver-based independent promotion Pacific Coast Championship Wrestling.

=== World Wrestling Federation (1998–1999) ===
In 1996, Stipich sent a tape consisting of vignettes to the World Wrestling Federation, with one of the segments seeing him dressed up as a Halloween character named Fobia and instructing kids on how to trick-or-treat safely. The character's origin story was based on a nest of spiders that lived under his bed. After reviewing the tape, the WWF gave him a tryout match in October 1997.

Stipich was signed to a developmental deal in January 1998, and he began training with Tom Prichard in the Memphis, Tennessee-based Power Pro Wrestling, where he stayed until he was called up to the WWF in 1999. While with PowerPro, one of the angles he was involved in revolved around Jerry Lawler and his real life wife, Stacy "The Kat" Carter. Stasiak first won the services of Stacy for two weeks by beating Jerry Lawler in a match. He then claims that they have started a relationship, and he introduces Stacy to his "sister" (storyline). The next week, he introduces Stacy to his "mother", Mae Young. This begins a series of different matches between Stasiak, Lawler, Mae Young, and Stacy.

He made his WWF debut on the April 18, 1999 episode of Sunday Night Heat as Meat, attacking Tiger Ali Singh. He soon became the storyline "boy-toy" of the Pretty Mean Sisters (Terri Runnels, Jacqueline, and Ryan Shamrock), although Shamrock left the company a few months later. Meat picked up many victories for a few months over the likes of Droz, Brian Christopher, and The Blue Meanie. However, he would soon be relegated to that of a jobber, with the on-air explanation for this was that he would tire himself out before matches by sexually pleasuring PMS. This led to Jacqueline leaving Meat and Terri by themselves.

The character only lasted a few months before he split from Terri after Terri saw Meat kissing Marianna, Terri's nemesis, on the Titantron. This led to her and Chaz attacking Meat. In the next couple of weeks, Stipich dropped the Meat name and began to compete under his Shawn Stasiak name. At Survivor Series, Stasiak was defeated by the debuting Kurt Angle.

Stasiak was later suspended in December 1999 after he recorded a heated conversation between Davey Boy Smith and Steve Blackman without their permission. Although Stasiak stated that this was done as a joke, he was fired regardless.

=== World Championship Wrestling (2000–2001) ===
After WWF, Stasiak was signed by World Championship Wrestling in early 2000. After training in the company's Power Plant wrestling school with Paul Orndorff, he made his WCW debut on the April 10, 2000 episode of Nitro by attacking Curt Hennig. He later joined the New Blood and began feuding with Hennig. He was soon given nicknames such as "The Perfect One" and later "Perfect" Shawn Stasiak, the latter of which was a parody of Hennig's "Mr. Perfect" character. Stasiak picked up two victories over Hennig, one of which was Stasiak's WCW pay-per-view debut on May 7, 2000 at Slamboree. Hennig soon became impressed with Stasiak and briefly coached him before Hennig's WCW contract expired in June 2000.

In late-May, Stasiak formed the tag team called the Perfect Event with Chuck Palumbo, and they soon won the World Tag Team Championship after defeating KroniK (Brian Adams and Bryan Clark). After winning the title, they began feuding with KroniK over the title. In August, the Perfect Event helped form The Natural Born Thrillers alongside Mike Sanders, Sean O'Haire, Mark Jindrak, Johnny the Bull and Reno, while they were briefly "coached" by Kevin Nash. Stasiak and Palumbo would later win the World Tag Team Title two more times before splitting in early January 2001 when Stasiak and Palumbo won a tag team battle royal with O'Haire and Jindrak. Sanders declared both teams victorious and that one member from each team would start teaming together and get a tag team title shot against The Insiders (Diamond Dallas Page and Kevin Nash).

Palumbo began teaming with O'Haire and they defeated the Insiders and became the World Tag Team Champions while Stasiak and Jindrak began teaming together. In February 2001, the Natural Born Thrillers broke up when Stasiak and Jindrak became jealous of Palumbo and O'Haire. The two teams faced off at SuperBrawl Revenge on February 18, 2001, for the World Tag Team Title, but Palumbo and O'Haire retained.

In March 2001, Stasiak acquired the services of Miss Hancock as his valet, gaining the nickname "The Mecca of Manhood" in the process. He was also, in storyline, hinted as the alleged father of Hancock's baby, which later turned out to be a stack of 8x10 cameras in a stroller. As a heel, Stasiak used the cameras to take pictures of himself before throwing the pictures to fans as a way to show off his physique. While with Miss Hancock, he also started a brief feud with Bam Bam Bigelow. The feud culminated on the last episode of Nitro on March 26, 2001, as Stasiak defeated Bigelow in a tattoo match. Following this, WCW was purchased by the World Wrestling Federation and most of the talent contracts, including Stasiak's, were picked up.

=== Return to WWF/E (2001–2002) ===
Stasiak returned to the WWF in July 2001 as part of The Alliance after WCW was bought by the WWF. Stasiak won at InVasion where he, Kanyon, and Hugh Morrus defeated the Big Show, Billy Gunn, and Albert. Throughout August, he was given the gimmick of being clumsy while trying to impress the Alliance's leader, Stone Cold Steve Austin. Every time he tried attacking major WWF stars such as The Rock or Kurt Angle, he would run into a wall, statue, milk truck, or just completely miss and trip over his boots. In late August, Stasiak was also briefly paired with Stacy Keibler again, but she stopped being his valet in late September to manage the Dudley Boyz. He was injured soon after and was out of action until late October.

On November 18 at Survivor Series, Stasiak, in storyline, lost his job along with all of the Alliance members when Team WWF defeated Team Alliance. The Alliance members still worked house shows and dark matches for a while, however, until being ready to be called up to the main active roster. However, Stasiak was injured in late November and required surgery on his knee to remove his damaged bursa sac. He was later cleared to wrestle on January 1, 2002. In February 2002, Stasiak was sent to the Heartland Wrestling Association for training and to work off ring rust.

Stasiak was later called up to the Raw brand in late-March 2002 and had his return televised match on the April 7, 2002, edition of Sunday Night Heat, defeating Tommy Dreamer and the following week on Sunday Night Heat Stasiak was defeated by Goldust.

Stasiak made his return on the April 15, 2002 episode of Raw with a new character that saw him claim that he was from Planet Stasiak, heard voices in his head, talked to himself with rhymes, and acted comically insane. On this same night, Stasiak was defeated by Big Show. Stasiak traded the Hardcore Championship several times with the likes of Steven Richards, Justin Credible, Bradshaw, and Tommy Dreamer until he requested his early release on September 27, 2002, to pursue other business ventures.

=== Independent Circuit (2007, 2010) ===
In 2007, Stasiak came out of retirement for the Texas-based independent promotion Professional Championship Wrestling wrestling three matches. On February 20, 2010, Stasiak wrestled his last match teaming with Rodney Mack as they lost to Prince Ali Farhat and Bash at Universal Championship Wrestling in Ardmore, Oklahoma.

== Chiropractic career ==
After his release, Stipich retired from wrestling and became a chiropractor. In 2007, he received a certificate in manipulation under anesthesia from the Academy of Physical and Manual Medicine in New York. Since 2008, he has been a member of the Advanced Comprehensive Medical team, based out of Texas, working as a chiropractor. Additionally, Stipich works as a personal trainer and motivational speaker. Stipich uses the Fobia character he created while in college during his talks with children.

== Other media ==
Stasiak appears in the video game WWF WrestleMania 2000 as Meat and WWE SmackDown! Shut Your Mouth as Shawn Stasiak.

== Personal life ==
Stipich is the son of former WWWF Champion Stan Stasiak. During his early childhood, Stipich travelled with his father as he wrestled in various territories, and met the likes of André the Giant and Jesse "The Body" Ventura during this time.

== Championships and accomplishments ==
=== Amateur wrestling ===
- Espoir World Cup
  - Winner (1990)
- National Collegiate Athletic Association
  - Ranked in the Top Twelve in Division I (1996)
- Ontario Federation of School Athletic Associations
  - Provincial Champion (1990)
- Pacific-10 Conference
  - Runner-up (1994, 1995)

=== Professional wrestling ===
- Pro Wrestling Illustrated
  - PWI ranked him No. 117 of the best 500 singles wrestlers in the PWI 500 in 2002
- World Championship Wrestling
  - WCW World Tag Team Championship (3 times) – with Chuck Palumbo
- World Wrestling Federation/World Wrestling Entertainment
  - WWF/E Hardcore Championship (15 times)
