= Team Taz =

Professional wrestling stable

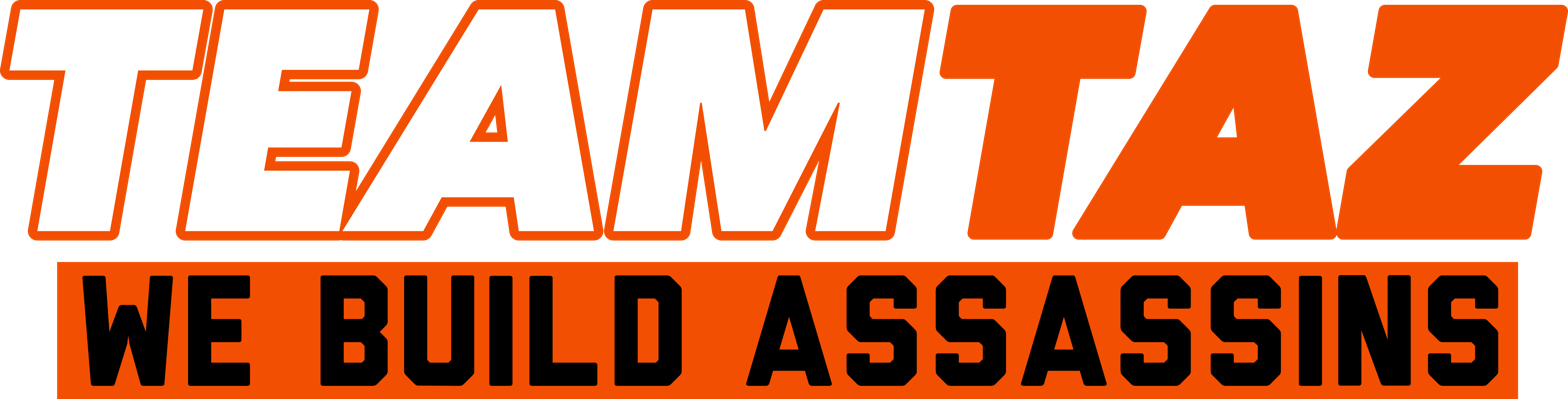
- Team Taz logo

Stable
- Members: See below
- Name(s): Team Taz; Team FTW
- Debut: July 23, 2020
- Disbanded: August 3, 2022
- Years active: 2020–2022

Team Taz, alternately called Team FTW, was an American professional wrestling stable signed to All Elite Wrestling (AEW). They were named after Taz, the leader and manager of the group.

== History ==
On the July 21, 2020 episode of AEW Dark, Ricky Starks aligned himself with Brian Cage, who was accompanied by Taz, by attacking Darby Allin. They officially formed a team which was known as "Team Taz". Team Taz started to feud with Allin and Cody Rhodes. On the November 18 episode of Dynamite, Allin and Rhodes were being attacked by Team Taz, when Will Hobbs came to the ring with a chair and it looked like Hobbs was about to attack Team Taz. However, Hobbs attacked Rhodes and aligned himself with Team Taz. On the November 26 episode of Dynamite, Will Hobbs' name was changed to Powerhouse Hobbs. On the December 16 episode of Dynamite, Hook (Taz's real life son Tyler Senerchia) was introduced as the newest member of Team Taz after it had been revealed Hook had been training to be a wrestler with Rhodes. On the same episode, Team Taz also started to feud with Sting, who came out to aid Rhodes and Allin. On the December 24 episode of Dynamite, Team Taz confronted Sting and were about to attack him, then the lights went off and Allin appeared in the ring along with Sting. On the Brodie Lee Celebration of Life episode of Dynamite on December 30, Starks, Hobbs, and Cage lost their match to Rhodes, Orange Cassidy and Preston "10" Vance. When the match was over, Team Taz attacked Cody, Cassidy, and Vance. Then lights went off and Allin looked at Team Taz, the lights again went off for the second time but this time Sting appeared with Allin.

A month later on the January 21, 2021 episode of Dynamite, it was announced that Ricky Starks and Brian Cage would face Darby Allin and Sting in a street fight at Revolution. At the event, Team Taz lost to Sting and Darby. 10 days later at St. Patrick's Day Slam, Team Taz came out and confronted Sting and Allin, only for Cage to take a microphone from Taz. He teased a face turn by saying that he respected Sting and that Sting was still "The Icon", much to the dismay of Team Taz. Over the next few months, tension was teased in the group between Ricky Starks and Brian Cage. During this, Powerhouse Hobbs also started a feud with the debuting Christian Cage after the group attempted to recruit Cage. On the April 21 episode of Dynamite, Starks failed to beat the number one ranked wrestler in AEW, "Hangman" Adam Page. During the match, Starks suffered a neck fracture after a botched reversal to a German suplex. Afterwards, the rest of Team Taz attacked Page. Also in the same night, Hobbs lost to Christian Cage. The following week, Brian Cage defeated Adam Page. On July 14 at Night 1 of Fyter Fest, Cage lost the FTW World Championship to Ricky Starks after being hit in the head with the title by Hobbs, effectively being kicked out of Team Taz.

On November 24, Dante Martin joined the group after Taz offered him a spot. However, on December 8, Martin eliminated Ricky Starks from the Dynamite Diamond Dozen Battle Royal which effectively removed Martin from the group. It was revealed that Dante joined the group as part of a scheme he created with Lio Rush, his tag team partner at the time.

Throughout the first half of 2022, Starks and Hobbs would continue to team together and chase the AEW World Tag Team Championship, while Hook would break out as a singles wrestler and eventually turn face. On the July 20 episode of Dynamite, Starks issued an open challenger for the FTW Championship, which was answered by Danhausen. At Fight for the Fallen on July 27, Starks issued an open challenge immediately after defeating Danhausen, which was answered by Hook, who defeated Starks for the title. After a post-match promo by Starks, Powerhouse Hobbs attacked him, turning Starks face, and leaving the future of the group in doubt. The following week on the August 3 episode of Dynamite, Taz announced that he was officially disbanding Team Taz.

== Members ==
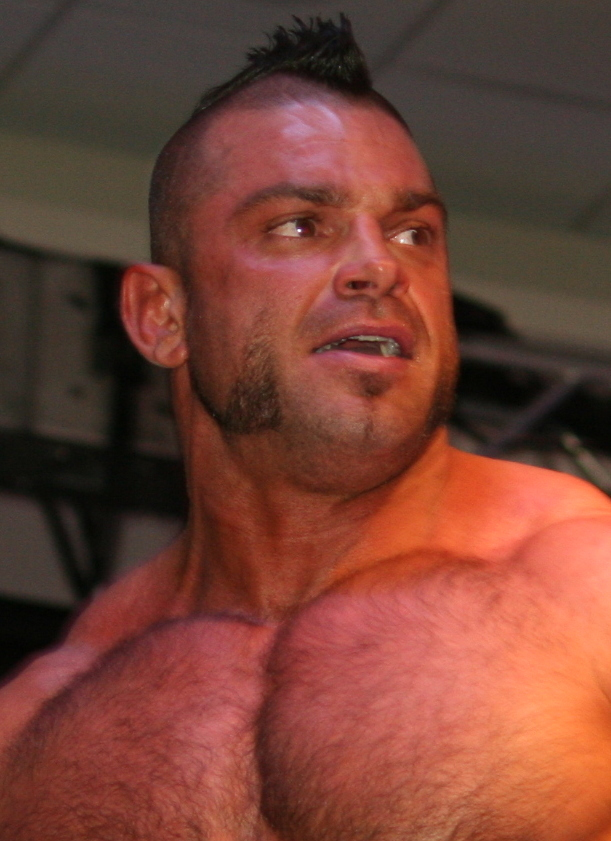
Brian Cage

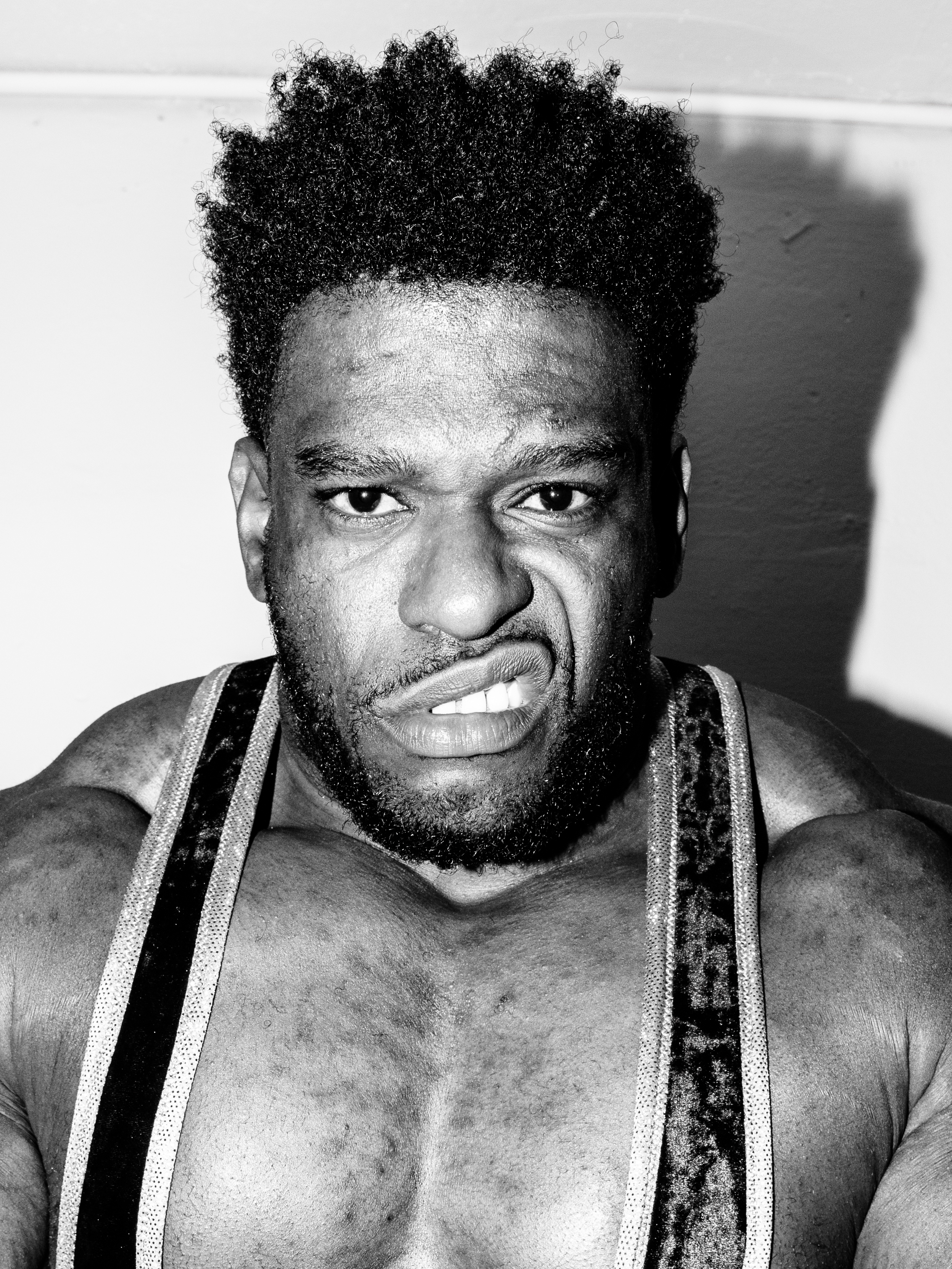
Powerhouse Hobbs

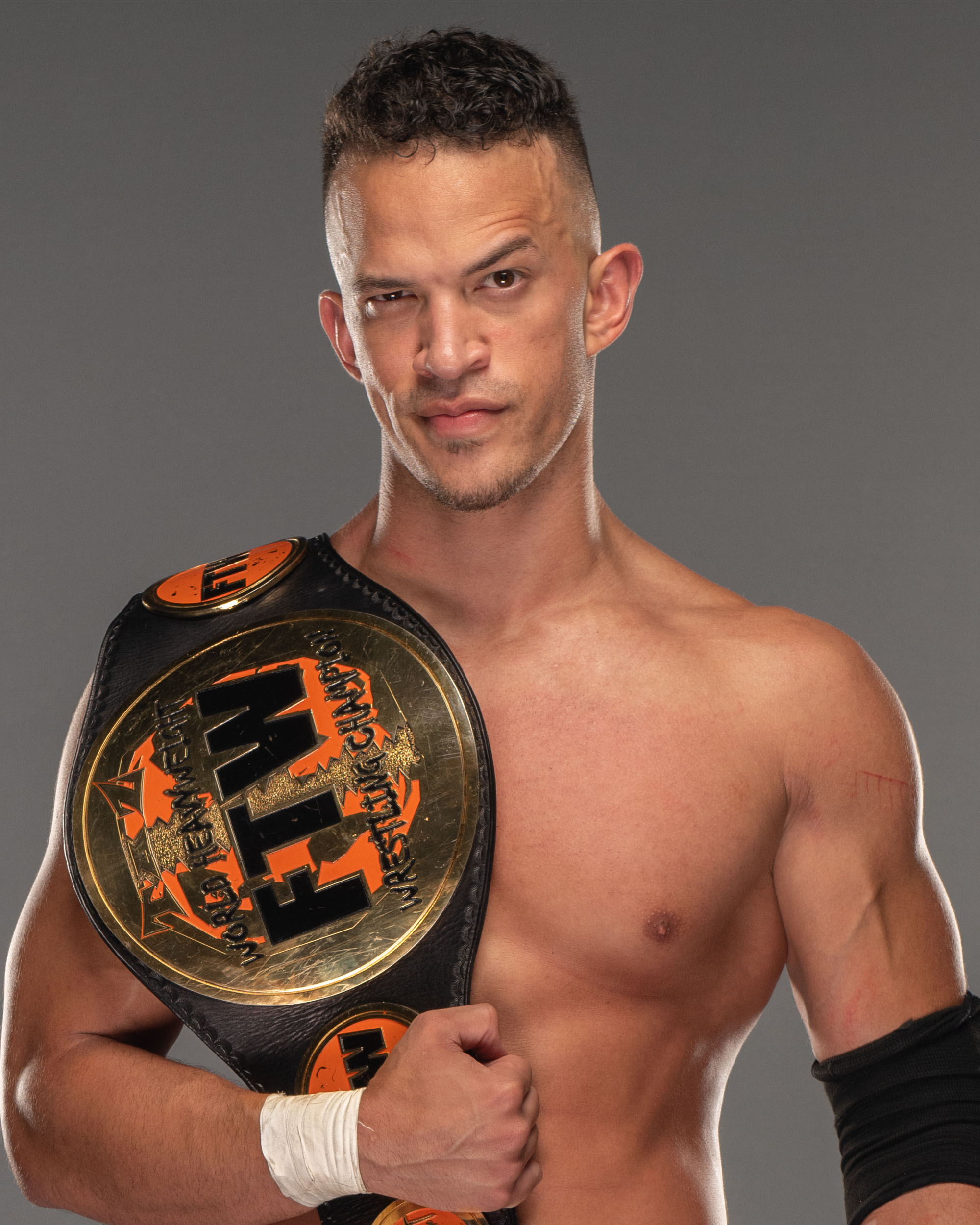
Ricky Starks

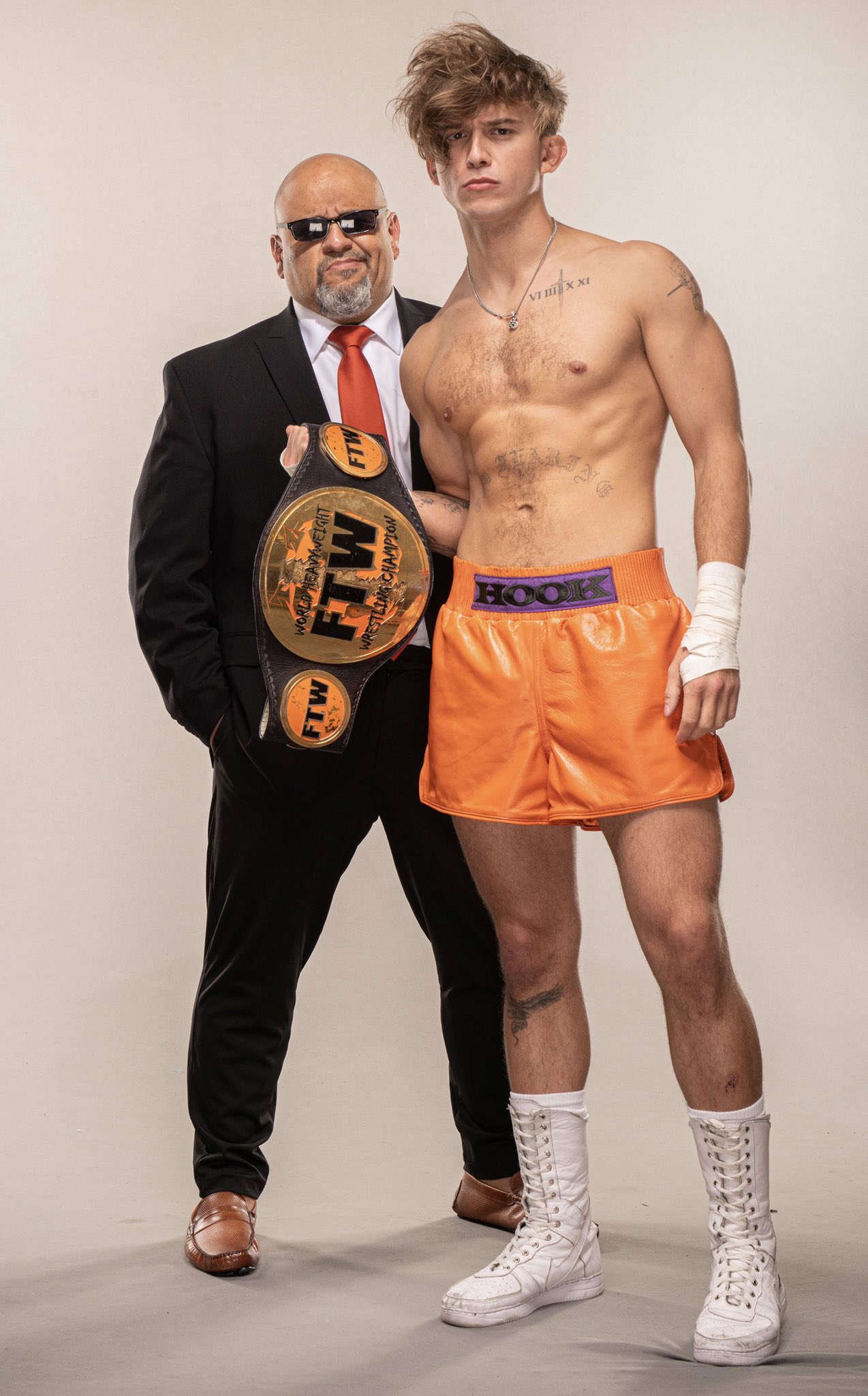
Taz alongside Hook

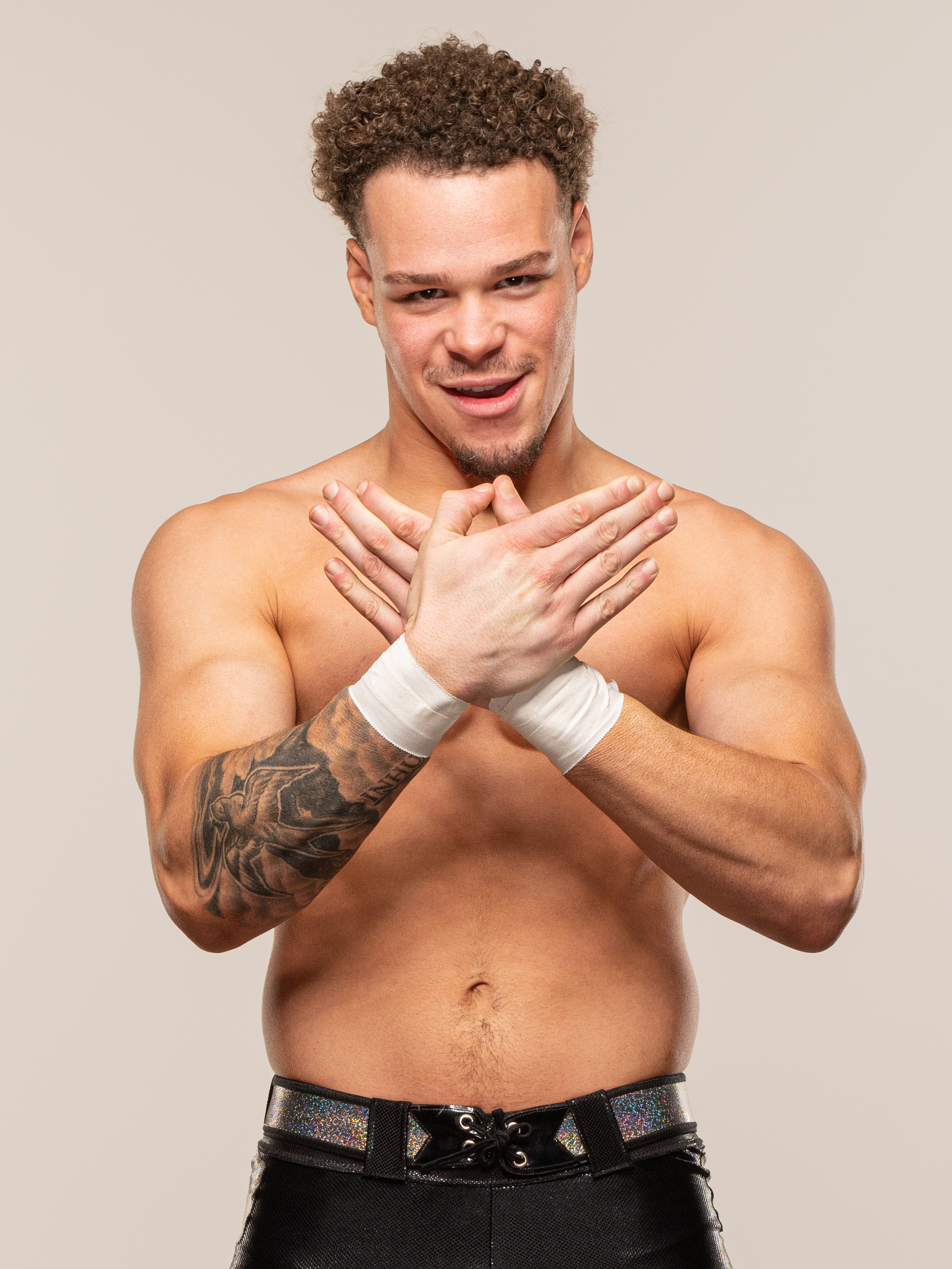
Dante Martin

Member		Joined	Left
Taz	L*	July 23, 2020	August 3, 2022
Brian Cage	*	July 23, 2020	July 14, 2021
Ricky Starks	*	July 23, 2020	August 3, 2022
Powerhouse Hobbs		November 19, 2020	July 27, 2022
Hook		December 16, 2020	August 3, 2022
Dante Martin		November 24, 2021	December 8, 2021

== Championships and accomplishments ==
- All Elite Wrestling
  - FTW Championship (3 times) – Cage (1), Starks (1), Hook (1)
  - Casino Ladder Match (2020) – Cage
- Wrestling Observer Newsletter
  - Best Non-Wrestler (2020) – Taz
