= AEW Revolution (2021) =

All Elite Wrestling pay-per-view event

Revolution
- Promotional poster featuring various AEW wrestlers
- Promotion: All Elite Wrestling
- Date: March 7, 2021
- City: Jacksonville, Florida; Atlanta, Georgia (Note: The tag team Street Fight pitting Darby Allin and Sting against Team Taz (Brian Cage and Ricky Starks) was pre-taped at a warehouse in Atlanta, Georgia; the exact location and tape date are unknown.)
- Venue: Daily's Place
- Attendance: 1,300
- Buy rate: 135,000

Pay-per-view chronology
← Previous; Full Gear	Next → Double or Nothing

Revolution chronology
← Previous; 2020	Next → 2022

The 2021 Revolution was the second annual Revolution professional wrestling pay-per-view (PPV) event produced by All Elite Wrestling (AEW). It was broadcast on March 7, 2021. While the majority of the event aired live from Daily's Place in Jacksonville, Florida, the tag team Street Fight, which was produced as a cinematic match, was pre-recorded at an undisclosed location in Atlanta, Georgia. It was AEW's first PPV event held on a Sunday, as all of their previous PPVs were held on Saturdays. The event aired through traditional PPV outlets, as well as on B/R Live in North America and FITE TV internationally.

Nine matches were contested at the event, including one on The Buy In pre-show. In the main event, Kenny Omega defeated Jon Moxley in an Exploding Barbed Wire Deathmatch to retain the AEW World Championship. In the penultimate match, Darby Allin and Sting defeated Team Taz (Brian Cage and Ricky Starks) in a Street Fight, in what was both Sting's AEW in-ring debut and first match since competing at WWE's Night of Champions event in September 2015, coming out of retirement. In other prominent matches, The Young Bucks (Matt Jackson and Nick Jackson) defeated The Inner Circle (Chris Jericho and MJF) to retain the AEW World Tag Team Championship in the opening bout, and Hikaru Shida defeated Ryo Mizunami to retain the AEW Women's World Championship The event was also notable for the surprise appearances of Maki Itoh, Ethan Page, and Christian Cage, the latter two making their AEW debut.

Tickets for the event sold out in just minutes. The event drew an attendance of over 1,300 people, AEW's largest attended show during the COVID-19 pandemic up to that point, and continued the promotion's plans to begin admitting more spectators to events, as All Out drew 750 and Full Gear drew 1,000 fans. It had an estimated 125,000 buys and grossed more than $6 million in sales, making it the highest grossing non-WWE wrestling PPV since 1999.

== Production ==
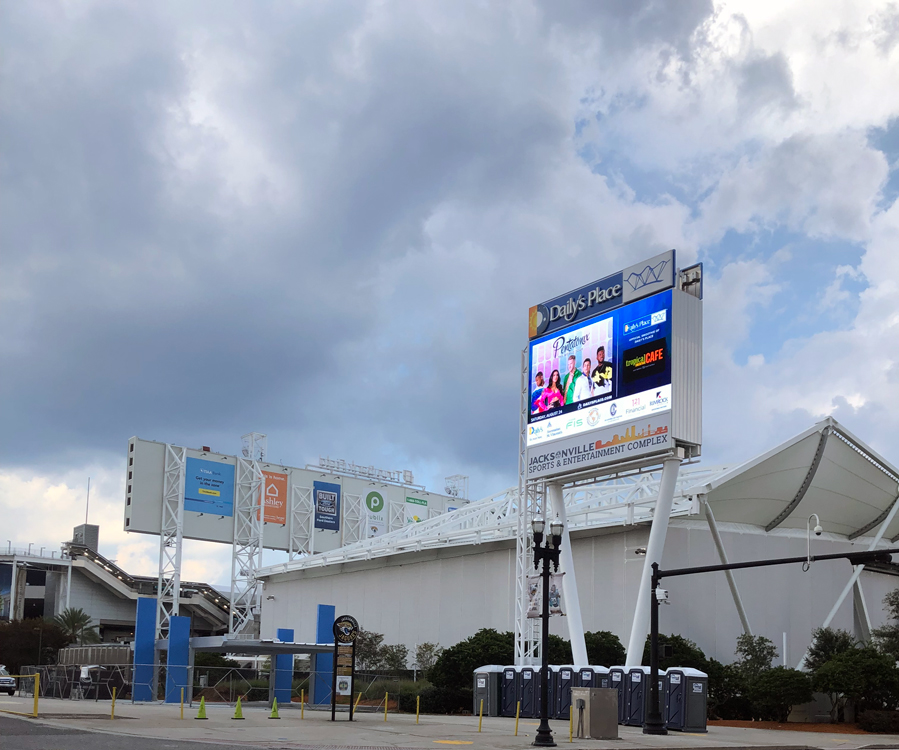
Due to the COVID-19 pandemic, the majority of the event was held at Daily's Place in Jacksonville, Florida.

=== Background ===
On February 29, 2020, the American professional wrestling promotion All Elite Wrestling (AEW) held a pay-per-view (PPV) event titled Revolution. Later that year at Full Gear, AEW announced that Revolution would return to PPV on February 27, 2021, thus establishing Revolution as an annual pay-per-view for the promotion. Due to the ongoing COVID-19 pandemic, the event was held at the promotion's home venue of Daily's Place in Jacksonville, Florida. It is considered as being one of AEW's "Big Four" PPVs, which includes Double or Nothing, All Out, and Full Gear, their four biggest domestic shows produced quarterly.

Due to unwanted conflicts with the Canelo Alvarez vs. Avni Yildirim bout in Miami Gardens, Florida on the originally scheduled date of February 27, AEW rescheduled Revolution for Sunday, March 7. The promotion had considered moving the event to Saturday, March 6, but that date fell through as UFC 259 was scheduled for that same night, and AEW did not want to also air their PPV against the Ultimate Fighting Championship (UFC) event. This in turn made it AEW's first pay-per-view to take place on a Sunday.

AEW partnered with Cinemark Theatres to air Revolution in select movie theatres. On March 3, immediately following Dynamite, TNT aired a one-hour television special called Countdown to Revolution. The special averaged 347,000 viewers and drew a 0.12 in the 18–49 key demographic.

=== Storylines ===
Revolution comprised nine professional wrestling matches, including one on The Buy In pre-show. The matches involved different wrestlers from pre-existing scripted feuds and storylines. Storylines were produced on AEW's weekly television program, Dynamite, the supplementary online streaming show, Dark, and The Young Bucks' YouTube series Being The Elite.

At Winter Is Coming on December 2, 2020, Kenny Omega won the AEW World Championship from Jon Moxley with assistance from his close friend and Impact Wrestling's vice president, Don Callis. Over the next few weeks, Omega would make appearances on Impact! and reunite with his former Bullet Club stablemates, close friends, and Impact World Tag Team Champions The Good Brothers (Doc Gallows and Karl Anderson), who would also make appearances on Dynamite to attack Moxley. On the February 17 episode, Moxley was again attacked by The Good Brothers and Omega, with Omega announcing that Moxley would receive his rematch at Revolution in an Exploding Barbed Wire Deathmatch.

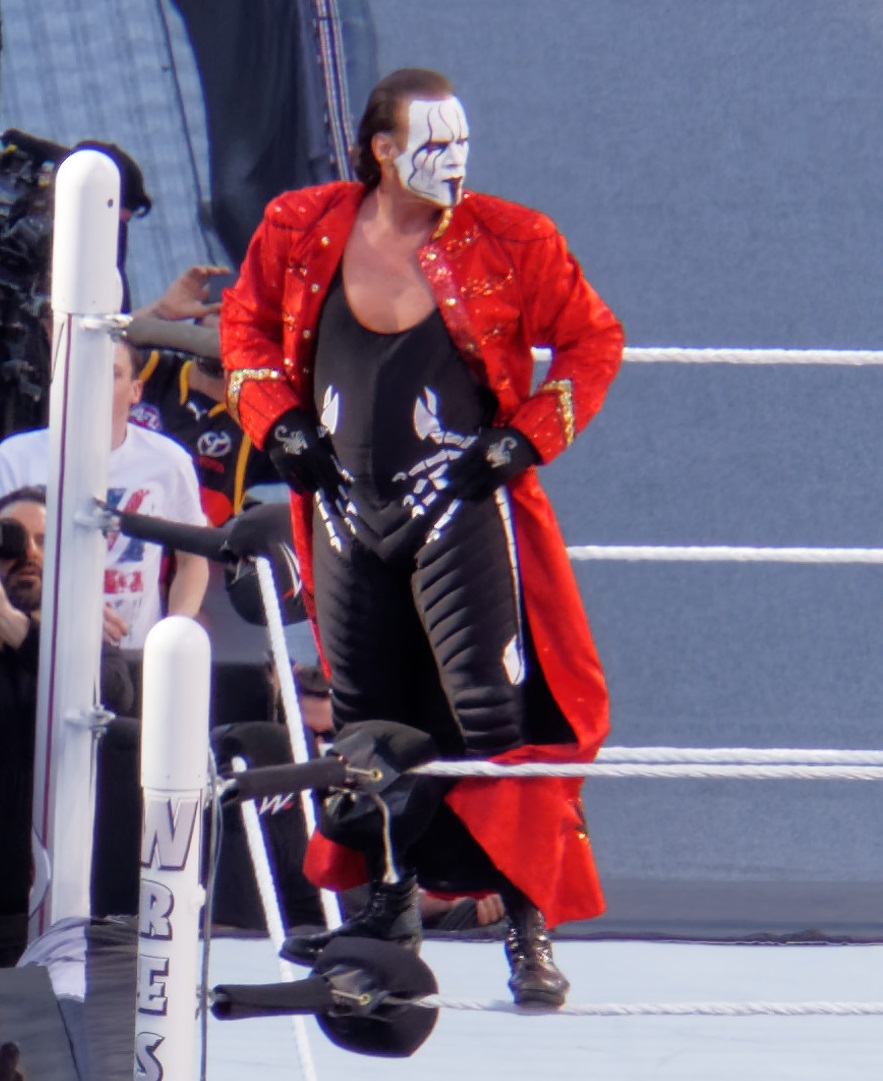
At Revolution, Sting came out of retirement and had his first match in over five years, which was also his first match in AEW

Also at Winter Is Coming, Sting made his AEW debut, saving Cody Rhodes, Dustin Rhodes, and AEW TNT Champion Darby Allin from a beatdown by Team Taz (Brian Cage, Ricky Starks, and Powerhouse Hobbs). On the January 20, 2021 episode of Dynamite, the stable's manager, Taz, stated that he wanted to take the fight to the streets, and issued a challenge to Allin and Sting. The next day, it was announced that Allin and Sting would face Team Taz (Cage and Starks) in a Street Fight at Revolution, marking Sting's first match in AEW and his first match in over five years following his retirement in 2016.

On the January 20 episode of Dynamite, a tag team battle royal was announced for Beach Break, with the winners getting an AEW World Tag Team Championship match against The Young Bucks (Matt Jackson and Nick Jackson) at Revolution; The Young Bucks also participated and had they won, they could have chosen their opponents. Chris Jericho last eliminated Dante Martin of Top Flight to win the battle royal, earning himself and Inner Circle stablemate MJF a tag title match at Revolution.

Also on the January 20 episode of Dynamite, AEW announced a 16-woman, single-elimination tournament to determine the #1 Contender for the AEW Women's World Championship, with the winner receiving a title shot at Revolution. On the March 3 episode of Dynamite, Ryo Mizunami defeated Nyla Rose to win the tournament.

On the February 17 episode of Dynamite, a six-man ladder match was announced for Revolution, where the winner receives a future match for the TNT Championship. Cody Rhodes, Scorpio Sky, and Penta El Zero Miedo were announced as the first three participants; they were the first three wrestlers to agree to terms for the Face of the Revolution Ladder match. Lance Archer defeated Rey Fenix on the February 24 episode of Dynamite, and Max Caster defeated Preston Vance on the March 3 episode of Dynamite to qualify, while the sixth participant was announced to be revealed at Revolution.

After being kicked out of The Elite, "Hangman" Adam Page would find himself being courted by The Dark Order to join their ranks, which he refused each time. At the same time, Page was also being scouted by "Big Money" Matt Hardy. On the February 10 episode of Dynamite, Hardy bought out a bar to celebrate their tag team win one week prior and coaxed a seemingly drunken Page into signing a contract to become his manager, with Hardy taking 30% of Page's earnings. The next week on Dynamite, Page revealed he had actually swapped the contract which Hardy unknowingly signed for a "Big Money" match at Revolution; if Hardy loses, Page gets 100% of Hardy's 2021 first-quarter earnings. Hardy then told Page if he claims to be an "honorable man" that he should also put his earnings on the line, to which Page agreed.

On February 26, a men's tag team variation of AEW's Casino Battle Royale was scheduled for Revolution, called the Casino Tag Team Royale. The order of entrants was based on a lottery. Two tag teams would start the match, and every 90 seconds, a new team would enter. Individual eliminations would occur when a wrestler had gone over the top rope and both feet hit the floor; a team was eliminated when both members of the team had been ruled out of the match. The match would end when one wrestler or team was left. The winning tag team earned a future AEW World Tag Team Championship match. A total of 15 teams were confirmed for the match.

On February 24, AEW announced the signing of Paul Wight, formerly known as Big Show in WWE. Wight made his debut on the March 3 episode of Dynamite in an interview with Schiavone, in which he said he had a "big scoop" that at Revolution, AEW would sign "a Hall of Fame worthy talent that is a huge surprise and a huge asset."

== Event ==
Other on-screen personnel
Role	Name
Commentators	Jim Ross (PPV)
Commentators	Excalibur (Pre-show and PPV)
Commentators	Tony Schiavone (Pre-show and PPV)
Commentators	Taz (Street Fight)
Commentators	Don Callis (Omega vs. Moxley)
Spanish commentators	Alex Abrahantes
Spanish commentators	Dasha Gonzalez
Spanish commentators	Willie Urbina
French commentators	Alain Mistrangélo
French commentators	Norbert Feuillan
German commentators	Günter Zapf
German commentators	Mike Ritter
Ring announcer	Justin Roberts
Referees	Aubrey Edwards
Referees	Bryce Remsburg
Referees	Frank Gastineau
Referees	Mike Posey
Referees	Paul Turner
Referees	Rick Knox
Interviewer	Alex Marvez

=== The Buy-In ===
One match was contested on The Buy-In pre-show, which saw Dr. Britt Baker, D.M.D. (accompanied by Rebel) and Maki Itoh take on Riho and Thunder Rosa in a tag team match. Rebel was originally scheduled to team with Baker, however was injured and replaced by Itoh making a surprise appearance. After Rebel hit Rosa with a crutch, Baker pinned her to win the match. It was Itoh's domestic AEW debut, having participated in the Warabi Regional for the AEW Women's World Championship Eliminator Tournament.

=== Preliminary matches ===
In the opening match, The Young Bucks (Matt Jackson and Nick Jackson) defended the AEW World Tag Team Championship against The Inner Circle (Chris Jericho and MJF) (accompanied by Wardlow). In the end, The Young Bucks performed a Meltzer Driver on Jericho to win the match and retain the championship.

The next match was a Casino Tag Team Royale to determine the next challengers for the AEW World Tag Team Championship. Rey Fénix (who represented the team of Death Triangle) lastly eliminated Jungle Boy (who represented Jurassic Express) to win the match.

Next, Hikaru Shida defended the AEW Women's World Championship against Ryo Mizunami. Shida won the match after performing a "Corkscrew Knee". After the match, Shida and Mizunami were attacked by Nyla Rose, Britt Baker, and Maki Itoh, before Thunder Rosa came out to make the save.

In the following match, Miro and Kip Sabian (accompanied by Penelope Ford) took on Best Friends (Chuck Taylor and Orange Cassidy) in a tag team match. In the climax, Miro forced Taylor to submit to the "Game Over" to win.

After this, Adam Page wrestled Matt Hardy in a Big Money Match, where the winner of the match would receive the loser's 2021 first-quarter earnings. After receiving assistance from The Dark Order, Page performed the "Buckshot Lariat" on Hardy to win the match. After the match, Page celebrated and drank beer with members of The Dark Order.

The next match was the Face of the Revolution Ladder Match, with the winner receiving a match for the AEW TNT Championship on the next episode of Dynamite. The participants of the match were Cody Rhodes, Penta El Zero Miedo, Lance Archer, Scorpio Sky, Max Caster, and surprise entrant Ethan Page, making his AEW debut. Sky won the match after grabbing the giant brass ring that hung above the ring.

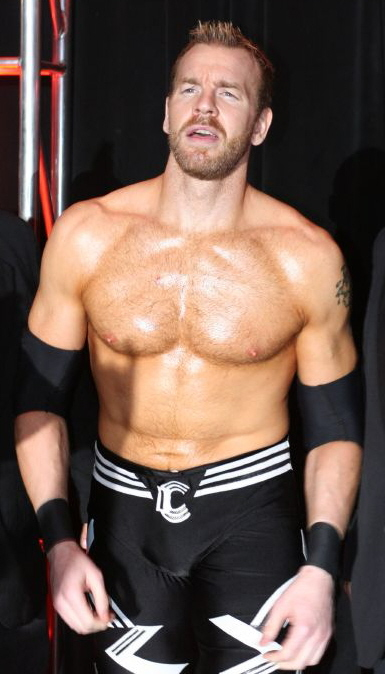
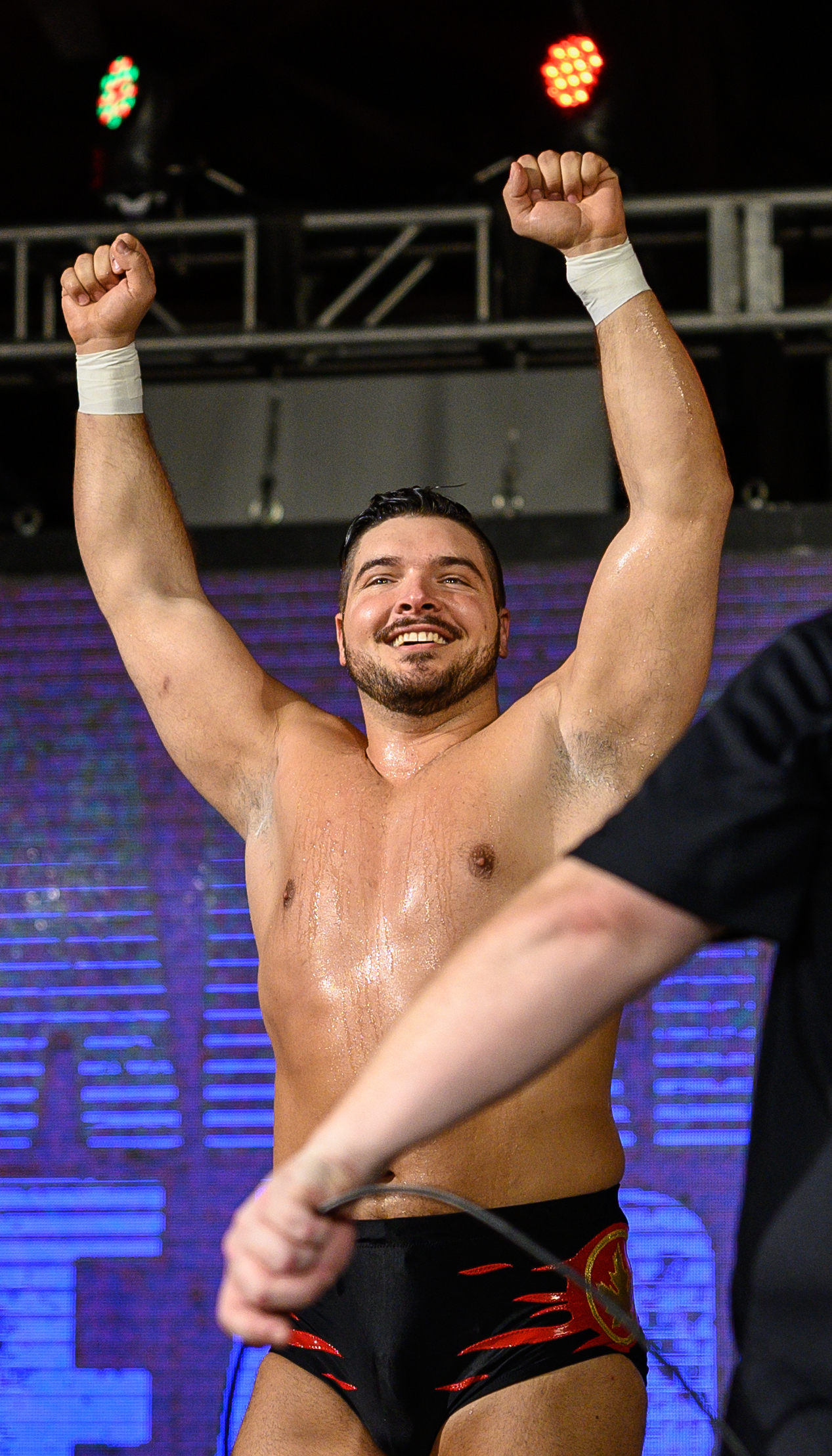
Two wrestlers made their AEW debut at Revolution: Christian Cage (left) and Ethan Page (right)

After this, Christian Cage was unveiled as the "Hall of Fame worthy talent" teased by Paul Wight on the previous episode of Dynamite. Cage walked to the ring and signed a contract before leaving, also debuting the catchphrase "Out. Work. Everyone."

In the penultimate match, Sting and Darby Allin took on Team Taz (Brian Cage and Ricky Starks) in a Street Fight, which was produced as a cinematic match. It took place at an undisclosed location in Atlanta, Georgia. The two teams fought inside a warehouse where a ring was set up. After battling throughout the warehouse, using various items at their disposal, Allin performed a Coffin Drop on Cage from the second floor through wooden planks, which fell through to the floor below. Sting and Starks fought back into the ring where Sting won the match for his team after performing the "Scorpion Death Drop" on Starks.

=== Main event ===
In the main event, Kenny Omega defended the AEW World Championship against Jon Moxley in an Exploding Barbed Wire Deathmatch. In this particular match, three of the four sides of the ring ropes were replaced with barbed wire, which would explode if a wrestler made contact with them, and if the match did not conclude within 30 minutes, the ring would explode and whoever was left standing would be the winner. In the end, Omega received help from his allies Don Callis and The Good Brothers (Doc Gallows and Karl Anderson) in beating up Moxley and handcuffing him. Omega then won the match after performing a "One-Winged Angel" on Moxley onto a steel chair. After the match, Omega, Gallows, and Anderson continued to beat down Moxley until the one-minute timer began counting down for the ring to explode. The three departed but before the ring could explode, Eddie Kingston ran down to try and save Moxley. Kingston was not able to unhandcuff Moxley and covered Moxley to protect him from the lackluster explosion. Medical personnel tended to both wrestlers as the show went off the air.

== Reception ==
Revolution was generally well received by fans and critics who watched the show, with the exception of the event’s main event and ending, which was critically panned. Brent Brookhouse of CBSSports.com described Revolution as a show "filled with good in-ring action and fun surprises" which "largely lived up to expectations", praising the AEW Tag Team and Women's World Championship matches, as well as giving the highest grade of the event to the street fight, saying that "your mileage may vary on cinematic matches, but this allowed everyone involved to showcase their best qualities while also hiding the obvious limitations of Sting at 61 years old." He liked the main event, but added in closing, "the ending completely tainted everything that came before, ending what had been a very enjoyable show on a terrible note." Justin Barrasso of Sports Illustrated liked the AEW Women's World Championship match, the street fight, and the main event. He described Shida–Mizunami as a match "which was a hard-hitting, physical presentation of pro wrestling that enhanced the meaning of the Women’s Championship", and praised the efforts of Moxley and Omega's match, liking the "display of physicality and storytelling by Moxley and Omega" and hopes "the lack of an explosion does not overshadow the death match."

There was negative criticism towards the aftermath of the Exploding Barbed Wire Deathmatch, in which the ring was set to detonate after a 30-minute timer expired, with Eddie Kingston and Jon Moxley still inside, but ended in a visually weak-looking explosion that "didn't come anywhere near" the wrestlers, leading to what critics felt was an underwhelming payoff. Fans at the venue also booed at the finish. After the show went off the air, Moxley responded to the live crowd, saying: "Kenny Omega may be a tough son of a bitch, but he can't make an exploding ring worth a shit!" During the post-show media scrum, AEW President and CEO Tony Khan said: "I think we're all lucky that the bomb going off at the end didn’t really hurt anybody... Kenny's big master plan -- he built a dud. Who would have thought when he drew the big plan with crayons that maybe the bomb might not fail to take both guys out." He then responded to fans' criticism by saying, "but at the end, I don't know what people really wanted unless you wanted us to actually explode the guys at the end, there's only so much you can do. So without actually blowing the ring and blowing both guys up, I think the basic explanation is Kenny’s ring was set to explode and his plan as a heel who built this thing with a hammer and nails as we saw, the final bomb just didn't go off."

Tickets for the event sold out in just minutes. Over 1,300 people were present at Daily's Place, which is over 25% capacity, but under 30%, which made it AEW's largest attended event during the pandemic up to that point. In pay-per-view buys, the event did well, generating more than US$6 million in revenue. The number of purchases through B/R Live were up more than 50% than the previous Full Gear PPV in November 2020, with international PPV buys being up 20–40%. With linear PPV buys included, the event had an estimated 125,000 buys, exceeding Double or Nothing 2020's 120,000 buys, which was the company's best. As a result, Revolution 2021 was the highest grossing non-WWE wrestling PPV since 1999.

== Aftermath ==
On the following episode of Dynamite, Kenny Omega interrupted Christian Cage before he was about to interviewed, and explained that he had purposely planned for the ring to not explode in order to embarrass Jon Moxley. This led to a brawl between Omega, Eddie Kingston, Moxley and The Good Brothers, before Cage came to ring and also became involved in an altercation with Omega.

Jon Moxley and Eddie Kingston cut a promo with references to life in New York-area Sing Sing and Riker's Island prisons, and numerous references to AEW broadcast partner WarnerMedia characters, with Kingston calling Omega The Joker from Batman (DC Comics), and Moxley responded that Impact Wrestling (an AEW partner at the time) paid for the bomb, then asking Omega, "Let me ask you a question, when that bomb came in the mail, did it come in a box with big bold letters that said ACME on it?" with the reference to Road Runner and Wile E. Coyote (Looney Tunes), where Wile E. Coyote's tricks to take down the Road Runner coming from the Acme Corporation.

Also on the following episode of Dynamite, The Inner Circle held a "war council" meeting, where it was revealed that MJF had been secretly plotting against Jericho and had formed his own faction with Wardlow, Shawn Spears and FTR (Dax Harwood and Cash Wheeler), who then attacked all the members of the Inner Circle.

Additionally on the following episode of Dynamite, Scorpio Sky, who had won the Face of the Revolution Ladder Match, received his TNT Championship against Darby Allin, which Allin won.

== Results ==
No.	Results	Stipulations	Times
1^{P}	Dr. Britt Baker, D.M.D. and Maki Itoh (with Rebel) defeated Riho and Thunder Rosa	Tag team match	14:50
2	The Young Bucks (Matt Jackson and Nick Jackson) (c) defeated The Inner Circle (Chris Jericho and MJF) (with Wardlow)	Tag team match for the AEW World Tag Team Championship	17:50
3	Rey Fénix (representing Death Triangle) won by last eliminating Jungle Boy (representing Jurassic Express)	Casino Tag Team Royale for a future AEW World Tag Team Championship match	26:45
4	Hikaru Shida (c) defeated Ryo Mizunami	Singles match for the AEW Women's World Championship	15:10
5	Kip Sabian and Miro (with Penelope Ford) defeated Best Friends (Chuck Taylor and Orange Cassidy) by submission	Tag team match	7:50
6	"Hangman" Adam Page defeated Matt Hardy	Big Money Match; Winner received the loser's 2021 first-quarter earnings.	14:40
7	Scorpio Sky defeated Cody Rhodes (with Arn Anderson), Ethan Page, Lance Archer (with Jake Roberts), Max Caster and Penta El Zero Miedo	Face of the Revolution ladder match for a future AEW TNT Championship match	23:15
8	Darby Allin and Sting defeated Team Taz (Brian Cage and Ricky Starks) (with Hook and Powerhouse Hobbs)	Street Fight	13:40
9	Kenny Omega (c) (with Don Callis) defeated Jon Moxley	Exploding Barbed Wire Deathmatch for the AEW World Championship	25:15
(c) / – the champion(s) heading into the match; P / – the match was broadcast on the pre-show

=== AEW Women's World Championship Eliminator Tournament ===
The tournament used a regional format with the Jacksonville Regional at Daily's Place, while the Warabi Regional was held at Ice Ribbon Dojo in Warabi, Saitama, Japan.

Round of 16 (United States) February 10 (Dynamite) (Japan) February 15 (YouTube) (United States) February 17 (Dynamite) (United States) February 22 (YouTube)	Quarterfinals (Japan) February 22 (YouTube) (United States) February 24 (Dynamite) (United States) February 28 (Bleacher Report)
Leyla Hirsch	9:02
Thunder Rosa	Pin
Thunder Rosa	Pin
Riho	11:33
Serena Deeb	14:50
Riho	Pin
(United States) Jacksonville Regional
Tay Conti	8:45
Nyla Rose	Pin
Nyla Rose	Pin
Dr. Britt Baker, D.M.D.	13:25
Dr. Britt Baker, D.M.D.	Sub
Madi Wrenkowski (Note: Tournament alternate Madi Wrenkowski replaced Anna Jay due to a dislocated shoulder injury.)	5:15
Yuka Sakazaki	Pin
Mei Suruga	10:10
Yuka Sakazaki	Pin
Emi Sakura	13:45
Veny	Pin
Emi Sakura	12:30
(Japan) Warabi Regional
Maki Itoh	Sub
Ryo Mizunami	11:15
Ryo Mizunami	Count
Aja Kong	14:40
Aja Kong	Pin
Rin Kadokura	7:00

Semifinals (Japan) February 28 (Bleacher Report) (United States) March 1 (YouTube)
Thunder Rosa	13:40
Nyla Rose	Pin
Yuka Sakazaki	14:20
Ryo Mizunami	Pin

Final; March 3 (Dynamite)
Nyla Rose	12:50
Ryo Mizunami	Pin

=== Casino Tag Team Royale entrances and eliminations ===
Two tag teams started the match. Every 90 seconds, a new team entered. A team was eliminated when both competitors of the team were thrown over the top rope and both feet hit the floor. The match continued until there was only one competitor or team remaining.

Draw	Team	Entrants	Order	Eliminated by	Eliminations
1	The Natural Nightmares	Dustin Rhodes	16	The Butcher, The Blade, The Bunny, and Luchasaurus	0
1	The Natural Nightmares	Q. T. Marshall	7	Himself	3
2	The Dark Order	Alan "5" Angels	1	Q. T. Marshall	0
2	The Dark Order	Preston "10" Vance	15	The Blade	0
3	The Inner Circle	Santana	12	Jungle Boy	2
3	The Inner Circle	Ortiz	9	Jungle Boy	2
4	The Sydal Brothers	Matt Sydal	3	Santana and Ortiz	0
4	The Sydal Brothers	Mike Sydal	2	Santana and Ortiz	0
5	The Dark Order	Evil Uno	13	Marko Stunt	0
5	The Dark Order	Stu Grayson	8	Bear Country	0
6	Gunn Club	Austin Gunn	5	Q. T. Marshall	1
6	Gunn Club	Colten Gunn	6	Q. T. Marshall	1
7	The Pretty Picture	"Pretty" Peter Avalon	4	Gunn Club	0
7	The Pretty Picture	Cezar Bononi	10	Luchasaurus	0
8	Varsity Blonds	Brian Pillman Jr.	14	The Butcher	0
8	Varsity Blonds	Griff Garrison	11	Luchasaurus	0
9	Bear Country	Bear Boulder	18	The Butcher	2
9	Bear Country	Bear Bronson	19	The Butcher	2
10	Jurassic Express	Jungle Boy	29	Rey Fenix	4
10	Jurassic Express	Luchasaurus	17	Bear Country	3
11	The Butcher and The Blade	The Butcher	23	Daniels and Kazarian	4
11	The Butcher and The Blade	The Blade	20	Pac and Fenix	1
12	Private Party	Isiah Kassidy	22	Reynolds and Silver	0
12	Private Party	Marq Quen	21	Pac and Fenix	0
13	SoCal Uncensored	Christopher Daniels	24	Rey Fenix	1
13	SoCal Uncensored	Frankie Kazarian	26	Pac	1
14	Death Triangle (Team Winners)	Pac	28	Jungle Boy	3
14	Death Triangle (Team Winners)	Rey Fenix	-	Individual Winner	5
15	The Dark Order	Alex Reynolds	25	Jungle Boy	1
15	The Dark Order	John Silver	27	Rey Fenix	1

== See also ==
- 2021 in professional wrestling
- List of All Elite Wrestling pay-per-view events
