= Alicia Webb =

American professional wrestling valet (born 1979)

Personal information
- Born: Alicia Nicole Webb; May 4, 1979 (age 47) Houston, Texas, U.S.

Professional wrestling career
- Ring name(s): Aleesha; Alicia Webb; Ryan Shamrock; Symphony
- Billed height: 5 ft 6 in (168 cm)
- Billed weight: 105 lb (48 kg)
- Billed from: Sacramento, California
- Debut: January 11, 1999
- Retired: 2013

Alicia Nicole Webb (born May 4, 1979) is an American retired professional wrestling valet and occasional professional wrestler. She is best known for her appearances with the World Wrestling Federation (WWF) in 1999 under the ring name Ryan Shamrock and in World Championship Wrestling in 1999 to 2000 under the ring name Symphony.

== Professional wrestling career ==
=== World Wrestling Federation (1999) ===
Webb was hired by the World Wrestling Federation to make a one night appearance initially as a model. On January 11, 1999, Alicia debuted on Raw as "Ryan Shamrock", the kayfabe younger sister of Ken Shamrock. Val Venis flirted with her at ringside before his match, which led to Ken Shamrock running out and viciously attacking Venis, warning him to stay away from her. After giving Venis a beating, Billy Gunn appeared at the ring and flirtatiously mooned Ryan. Ken then went after Gunn, challenging him to an Intercontinental Championship match at the Royal Rumble.

On January 25, Ryan was officially introduced to the viewers by Val Venis. It was revealed that she had starred with Venis in the fictional pornographic film Shaving Ryan's Privates. On February 13, Ken Shamrock viciously attacked Val Venis and the WWF referees during an interview. At St. Valentine's Day Massacre, Ryan slapped Ken across the face, which caused him to lose his match to Venis later on. On February 15, Ryan helped Venis win his match after she was accidentally knocked off the apron only to be dumped by Venis following. That same night backstage, Billy Gunn tried consoling Ryan only to be attacked from behind by Ken. On March 1, Ryan came down to the ring during a match involving Venis, Shamrock and Goldust and was kissed by Goldust afterwards.

On March 8, Ryan managed Goldust in a match against Ken. At WrestleMania XV, Ryan and The Blue Meanie were in Goldust's corner for the Fatal Four Way match for the WWF Intercontinental Championship, which Road Dogg retained. On the April 5 episode of Raw, The Undertaker and his disciples decided to sacrifice Ryan as a way of sending a message to Stephanie McMahon and Vince McMahon. The next week on April 12, Ryan was found by Mankind in the boiler room. Later in the night, The Undertaker revealed to Ken that Ryan was in the boiler room. As Ken found Ryan, who was being consoled by Mankind, they were attacked by the Ministry of Darkness and The Undertaker grabbed her by the hair and called her "a little slut".

Having disappeared from the WWF for over a month, Ryan returned on the May 16, episode WWF Heat, distracting Droz during a tag team match, causing a loss against The Brood. Ryan then joined the Pretty Mean Sisters (PMS) stable with Terri Runnels and Jacqueline. She was depicted as a heel alongside Terri Runnels and Jacqueline Moore. On an episode of Raw, GTV revealed footage of the Pretty Mean Sisters in the locker room wearing towels. After being with PMS for three months, Webb departed the WWF that summer.

Webb later claimed that the WWF stopped booking her because she refused to sign a five-year contract with the company, citing her young age and because she felt the deal was too one-sided in the WWF's favor. Other accusations were that Joanie Laurer (Chyna) disliked her and would often mess with her possessions in the locker room. There were plans apparently by Vince McMahon and WWF head writer Vince Russo to do an incest angle between Webb and her storyline brother Ken Shamrock, whom she was dating in real life at the time, which Shamrock refused.

=== World Championship Wrestling (1999–2000) ===
In late 1999, Webb was contacted by former WWF head writer Vince Russo, who was now head booker of World Championship Wrestling (WCW), about joining the organization. She made her debut on a November 1999 episode of Monday Nitro as "Symphony", the valet of The Maestro. She was depicted as being "very nice" and also grew flowers and roses. On December 23, 1999, Symphony, Madusa and Spice were in a promo with Evan Karagias to show how women "act". On February 21, 2000, Symphony turned down a date from Buff Bagwell. After managing the Maestro for five months, the Maestro was released from WCW. In August 2000, Webb was also released from WCW.

=== Post WWE career (1999–2013) ===
Webb made her debut for the National Wrestling Alliance as Ryan Shamrock, competing in an Evening Gown match against Bobcat on October 30, 1999. She then wrestled on the Independent circuit against wrestlers such as Nicole Bass, Kara Slice, and Taylor Matheny as well as managing Ken Shamrock.

Webb made her debut for NWA Total Nonstop Action (TNA) as "Aleesha". Following this, Webb began to appear as a talent scout, appearing on the ramp and accepting money from various different wrestlers. The storyline did not go anywhere and Webb left the promotion shortly thereafter. In May 2007, Webb began working with the Mexican promotion Asistencia, Asesoría y Administración de Espectáculos (AAA) while managing X-Pac, whom she dated at the time. While managing X-Pac, Webb became part of La Legión Extranjera until sometime in 2009. On August 17, 2013, Webb managed Daivari in a match where he lost to Matt Hardy, who was managed by Reby Sky.
