= Jacqueline Moore =

American professional wrestler (born 1964)

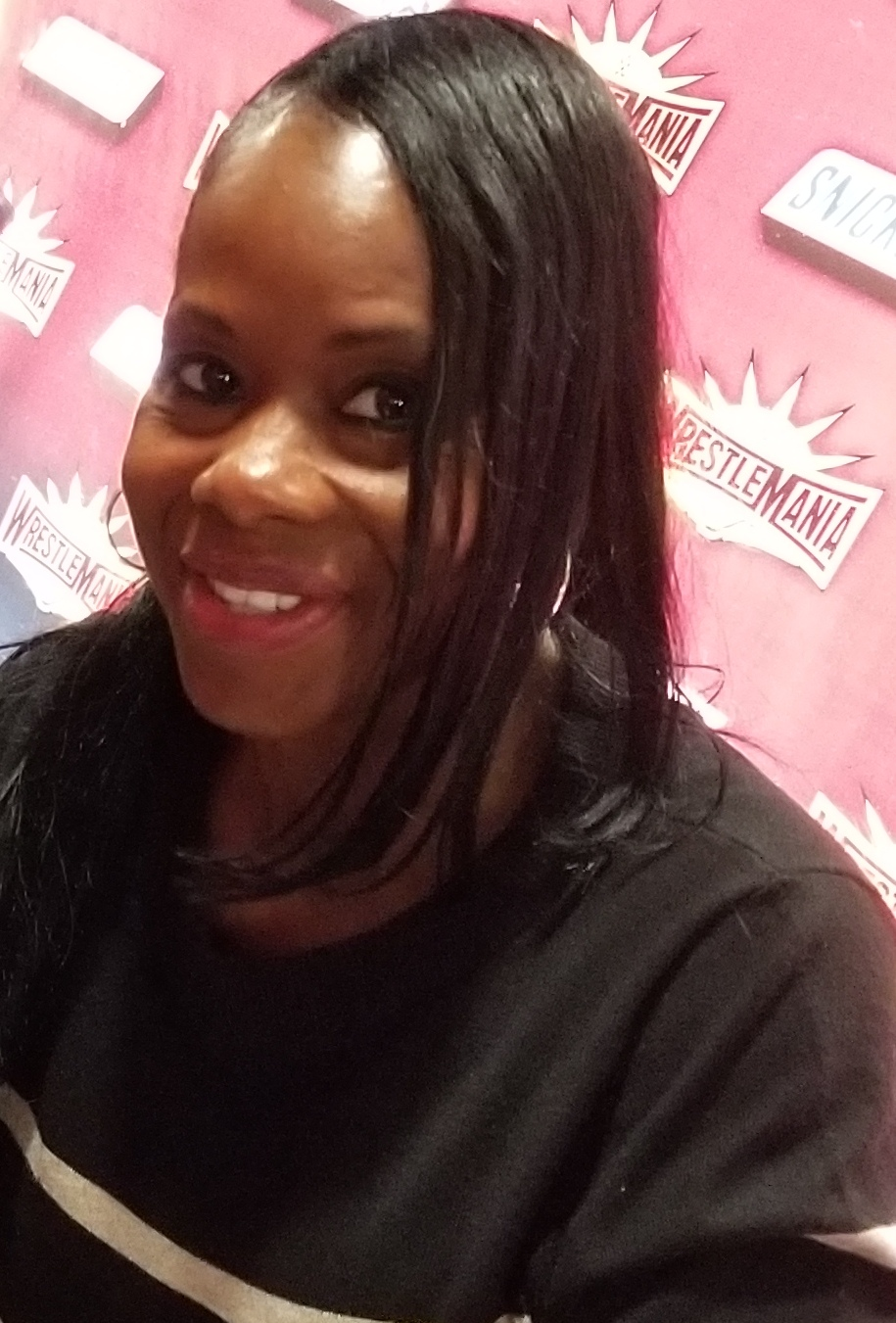
- Moore in 2019

Personal information
- Born: Jacqueline DeLois Moore; January 6, 1964 (age 62) Dallas, Texas, U.S.

Professional wrestling career
- Ring name(s): Jackie Moore; Jacqueline; Jacqueline Moore; Jackie; Jacquelyn Moore; Miss Jacqueline/Ms. Jacqueline; Miss Tennessee; Ms. Texas; Sgt. Rock; Queen Moishe; Wynonna; Sweet Georgia Brown
- Billed height: 5 ft 3 in (1.60 m)
- Billed weight: 119 lb (54 kg)
- Billed from: Dallas, Texas; Memphis, Tennessee
- Trained by: Skandor Akbar
- Debut: 1988

Signature
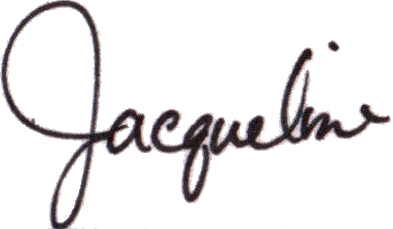

Jacqueline DeLois Moore (born January 6, 1964) is an American professional wrestler and professional wrestling manager. She is currently signed to WWE under a legends contract. Moore also worked for World Championship Wrestling in 1997–98 and later Total Nonstop Action Wrestling as a wrestler, manager, and road agent.

She began her career in World Class Championship Wrestling, but was well known in the United States Wrestling Association, where she was a fourteen-time USWA Women's Champion. She later moved to World Championship Wrestling, where she briefly served as Kevin Sullivan's valet and then the manager of Harlem Heat. In 1998, she joined the World Wrestling Federation (WWF, later World Wrestling Entertainment). She began managing Marc Mero and had her first rivalry with Sable, which culminated in the re-establishment of the WWF Women's Championship, which Moore held twice during her time with the WWF. In 1999, she formed an all-female alliance with Terri Runnels and Ryan Shamrock called the Pretty Mean Sisters. In the early 2000s, Moore worked as both a referee and trainer for the WWF, and she also held the WWE Cruiserweight Championship, which was a title predominantly held by men. She was the third woman to accomplish the feat, but the only woman to do so under the WWE banner (following Madusa and Daffney in WCW). In 2004, she joined TNA, where she worked mostly as a manager and occasional wrestler.

On April 2, 2016, Moore was inducted into the WWE Hall of Fame.

== Professional wrestling career ==
=== Early career (1988–1991) ===
Moore began her wrestling training at a local gym after meeting professional wrestling manager Skandor Akbar. She was the only female in Akbar's professional wrestling school in Dallas. She made her in-ring debut for World Class Championship Wrestling in 1988, under the name "Sweet Georgia Brown. As Sweet Georgia Brown, Moore had wrestled in Japan for Frontier Martial-Arts Wrestling, wrestling the likes of Megumi Kudo and Combat Toyoda. She also competed in all-women's promotions Ladies Professional Wrestling Association and Women's Pro Wrestling.

=== United States Wrestling Association (1991–1996) ===
Moore later moved on to the United States Wrestling Association in Memphis, where she was known as Miss Texas. She made her debut as a Heel Valet to Eric Embry and Tom Prichard as part of team Texas during the Texas vs Tennessee feud. She was later involved in a feud with the Dirty White Girl Kim Anthony and was involved in a Mudpit Match and a Hair vs Hair match which Anthony won and in the latter Moore had her hair shaved off. She was the first ever USWA Women's Champion, winning the newly created title in a tournament on March 2, 1992. Between March 1992 and August 1996, Moore held the title a total of eight times, swapping it with Lauren Davenport, Luna Vachon, and Debbie Combs. In 1993, Moore became the first female to be included in the Pro Wrestling Illustrated 500, detailing the top 500 professional wrestlers in the world. In 1995, Moore became involved in a feud with the valet of Reggie B. Fine and Don Bass, Sweet Georgia Brown. Brown was jealous of Texas after the USWA aired a music video of Moore, and they were involved in several catfights. Later in 1995, Moore feuded with Uptown Karen, the lover of Downtown Bruno. During the feud, Moore formed an alliance with former foe Sweet Georgia Brown. The Miss Texas/Uptown Karen feud culminated in a Hair vs. Hair match which was won by Texas. She also competed in Herb Abrams's Universal Wrestling Federation, winning the promotion's women's title in 1994. In late 1993, she appeared in a Jeff Jarrett promo for the WWF where Jarrett would be criticizing a young man's singing voice.

=== World Wrestling Federation (1993–1994) ===
Through the WWF's partnership with the USWA Jacqueline was scheduled to debut in the WWF under the name Wynonna as a manager for Jeff Jarrett. Jackie filmed vignettes, but she left the WWF before debuting, due to an injury. She also appeared in the February 1994 edition of the then WWF Magazine.

=== Smoky Mountain Wrestling (1995) ===
Moore joined Smoky Mountain Wrestling in October 1995 under the name Sgt. Rock and joined Jim Cornette's Militia, which included Tommy Rich, Robert Gibson, Terry Gordy, and The Punisher. However, her stint in SMW didn't last, as the company folded at the end of November.

=== World Championship Wrestling (1997–1998) ===
Moore began submitting pictures of herself to the Atlanta, Georgia-based World Championship Wrestling (WCW) and was eventually contacted by WCW employee J. J. Dillon, who offered her a contract. Jacqueline debuted in WCW as the manager of Kevin Sullivan, and she helped Sullivan by body slamming his opponents. She aided Sullivan in his feud with Chris Benoit and feuded with Sullivan's ex-wife, Woman. Her alliance with Sullivan came to an end at Bash at the Beach 1997, when she smashed a wooden chair over Sullivan's head causing him to lose a Loser Must Retire bout to Chris Benoit. At Road Wild on August 9, Jacqueline became the manager of Harlem Heat. She later engaged in a brief feud with Disco Inferno, whom she defeated at Halloween Havoc on October 26.

=== World Wrestling Federation/Entertainment (1998–2004) ===
==== Women's Champion (1998–2000) ====
Moore rejoined the World Wrestling Federation (WWF) in mid-1998, debuting on the June 1 episode of Raw as the new on-screen girlfriend of Marc Mero, to later began a feud with the estranged wife of Mero, Sable. Sable defeated Moore in a bikini contest on July 26, 1998, at Fully Loaded: In Your House after Sable removed her halter top to reveal a painted on bikini top. WWF Chairman Vince McMahon, however, disqualified Sable for not wearing a traditional bikini, and Moore was declared the winner. Moore and Mero were defeated by Sable and Edge on August 30 at SummerSlam. On the September 14, 1998, episode of Raw, she would also wrestle Sable in a controversial evening gown match which saw one of her breasts exposed.

In September with the revived WWF Women's Championship on the line (the Women's Championship had been abandoned in December 1995), Moore defeated Sable to become the new champion, and the first African-American Women's Champion. Two months later at Survivor Series, Sable defeated Moore to become the new champion.

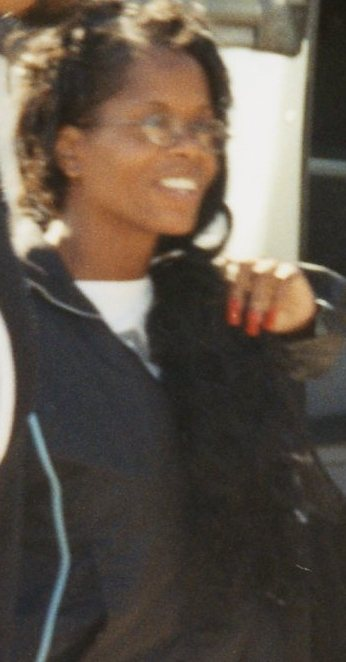
Moore in c. 1999

Moore and Mero separated on the November 22 episode of Sunday Night Heat, and the jilted Moore formed a new alliance of women known as the Pretty Mean Sisters (PMS) with Terri Runnels, who was separated from her husband, Goldust. During a match between Mero and Goldust on the November 23 episode of Raw, Jacqueline and Terri entered the ring and low-blowed both men.

They originally formed an alliance with D'Lo Brown and Mark Henry, accompanying them to the ring for a match against Val Venis and The Godfather in December at Rock Bottom: In Your House. In January, Terri claimed to have suffered a miscarriage after she was knocked off of the ring apron by Brown. The guilty Brown became a servant to PMS, who forced him to wrestle his friend, Mark Henry. The deception lasted until February 1, when the ringside doctor told Brown that Terri had not been pregnant. PMS then feuded with Brown by costing him matches and attacking his new manager, Ivory. Jacqueline returned to the women's division in March, and on the April 12 episode of Raw, she, Ivory, Tori, and Sable took part in a four-way match for the Women's Championship. The match was declared a no-contest after Sable's bodyguard Nicole Bass stormed the ring and chokeslammed the three challengers.

In May, however, the women had switched their allegiance to a wrestler named Meat. That same month, the stable expanded once more to incorporate Ryan Shamrock, who had been spurned by the womanizing Val Venis. As part of the storyline, the three women used Meat for his body as a "love slave", forcing him to have sex with them and wear wrestling tights that resembled a pair of tight underwear. After Shamrock left the WWF, Terri and Jacqueline continued to assist Meat in his matches. However, tension began to grow between the two women as Terri, in storyline, exhausted Meat with hours of sex before his matches and then berated her fatigued lover when he lacked the energy to win matches and Moore finally end the alliance by July.

On the February 1, 2000, episode of SmackDown, Jacqueline won the WWF Women's Championship for a second time after defeating Harvey Wippleman (who had won the belt from Miss Kitty while in drag and calling himself "Hervina") in a Lumberjill Snowbunny match, a match that took place in a snow filled pool surrounded by female wrestlers whose purpose was to keep The Kat and Hervina from leaving the pool. She successfully defended her title against Luna Vachon, with whom she started a brief feud, however in March, she lost the title to Stephanie McMahon, following extensive interference from D-Generation X. In June she competed in the first-ever women's battle royal on Smackdown, to determine a #1 contender to Stephanie's title, but failed to win.

==== Various storylines (2000–2004) ====
Throughout August and September, Moore had a series of matches against then-Women's Champion Lita, which included a Hardcore match, as well as against Dean Malenko for the WWF Light Heavyweight Championship, in which she was unsuccessful. In January 2001 during a match against Lita, both women attacked Right to Censor member Ivory, who was on commentary that night criticizing the women's division. Later on that year, Jacqueline starred in the first season of the WWF's reality show Tough Enough as a trainer alongside Al Snow, Tazz and Tori.

In late 2001, she took part in the Six Pack Challenge for the vacant WWF Women's Championship on November 18 at Survivor Series, which was won by Trish Stratus. Several weeks later, Moore challenged Stratus for the title at Vengeance. Stratus won the match after surprising Moore with a backslide pin.

In 2002, Moore became a referee, with her debut match being a Women's Championship bout between Jazz and Trish Stratus at the Royal Rumble. In late 2002, she and Stratus began a feud with Victoria, leading to a Triple Threat match at Armageddon, in which Victoria retained the title. In 2003, the return of Jazz culminated in a Four-Way match for Jazz's title at Judgment Day on May 18, 2003, which Jazz won.

Moore seldom appeared throughout late 2003 and early 2004. On the May 6, 2004, episode of SmackDown!, WWE Cruiserweight Champion Chavo Guerrero issued an open challenge for anyone to face him for his title, and Moore defeated him to win the Cruiserweight Championship. She lost the championship back to Guerrero at Judgment Day in a match where his arm was tied behind his back. The company released Moore in June 2004 when the creative team could not come up with any storylines for her character.

=== Independent circuit (2005–2006) ===
In June 2005, she had a match with the Independent Association of Wrestling (IAW) against Vanessa Harding. On June 25, she defeated Harding and Crystal Carmichael to win the IAW Women's Championship. In March 2006, she also competed in Mexico.

=== Total Nonstop Action Wrestling (2004-2013) ===
==== First appearances (2004) ====
Moore debuted in Total Nonstop Action Wrestling as a babyface at the Victory Road pay-per-view on November 7, 2004, losing a singles match to the villainous Trinity. She made a second appearance with TNA on December 5 at Turning Point, where she refereed a tag team match between Pat Kenney and Johnny B. Badd against Johnny Swinger and Glenn Gilberti.

==== Beer Money, Inc. (2007–2009) ====
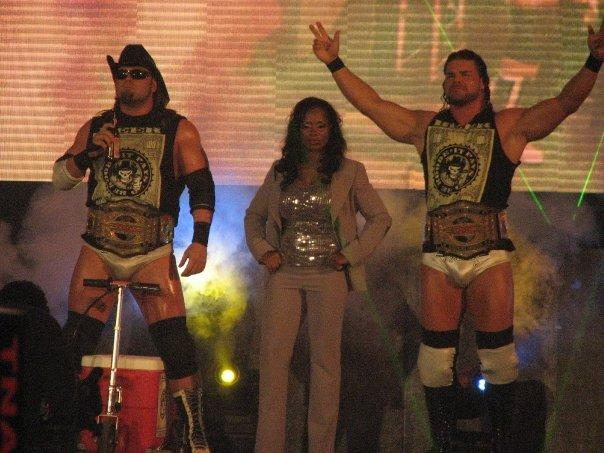
Moore along Beer Money, Inc. (James Storm and Robert Roode) during an TNA live show in 2008

She returned to TNA as a villainess at Final Resolution on January 14, 2007, joining forces with James Storm by attacking his manager, Gail Kim. on the February 15 episode of Impact Wrestling, Moore lost to Gail Kim in an Arm Wrestling Match. Storm and Moore teamed up to defeat Kim and Petey Williams at both Against All Odds and Destination X. Moore, however, was defeated by Kim at Lockdown in TNA's first women's steel cage match. Later, during a Street Fight with Kim on the May 3 episode of Impact!, Moore's two front teeth were knocked out of her mouth after a spot where she had a trash can placed over her head and beaten with a broom stick. Moore, who would lose the match, went on later that night with Beer Money, Inc to film a promo. on the July 5 episode of Impact Wrestling, Moore lost a 3-way Knockouts match to Gail Kim also involving Ms. Brooks. On the September 27 episode of Impact Wrestling, Moore lost a fatal five-way match which was won by Roxxi Laveaux also involving Kim, Brooks and Christy Hemme. On the October 4 episode of Impact Wrestling, Moore lost to Gail Kim. At Bound for Glory, Moore competed in the Gauntlet for the Gold match to crown the first TNA Women's Knockout Champion which was won by Gail Kim. on the December 13 episode of Impact Wrestling, Moore and Traci Brooks lost to Angelina Love and Velvet Sky. On the December 20 episode of Impact Wrestling, Moore competed in a Santa's Workshop Knockouts Street Fight which was won by Awesome Kong. On the December 27 of Impact Wrestling, Moore, Roxxi and ODB lost to The Beautiful People and Gail Kim. Throughout early and mid-2008, she continued to participate in women's matches, but failed to obtain the TNA Knockouts Championship she also manage James Strom throughout 2008 as well. On the February 21 episode of Impact Wrestling, Moore and Roxxi Leveaux defeated Gail Kim and ODB. At Lockdown, Moore competed in a Queen of the Cage match which was won by Roxxi Laveaux. She then managed Beer Money, Inc. (Storm and Robert Roode), before being removed from television to work as a backstage agent. On the May 8 episode of Impact Wrestling, Moore competed in an Immunity on a Pole match which was won by Gail Kim. at Sacrifice, Moore competed in a 10-woman TNA Knockouts Makeover Battle Royal which was won by Gail KIm. At Bound for Glory IV, Moore tried to help Beer Money win the Monster's Ball match after Jacqueline interrupted a pin attempt by Homicide on Storm, with Steve McMichael spanking her in retaliation. On June 19, 2009, she returned to in-ring action, defeating Rhaka Khan at a house show in Grand Rapids, Michigan. On the July 17 episode of Impact Wrestling, Moore participated in a #1 Contenders Knockout Gauntlet match which was won by Velvet Sky. On the August 7 episode of Impact Wrestling, Moore lost to Roxxi Laveaux in a Bimbo Brawl. On the September 25 episode of Impact Wrestling, Moore and Beer Money defeated LAX and Hector Guerrero. On June 19 at a house show, Moore defeated Rhaka Khan in her last match of that run with TNA. On July 12, 2009, TNA parted ways with Moore.

==== Alliance with ODB (2011) ====
On June 13, 2011, Moore returned to TNA as ODB's new tag team partner at the tapings for the June 16 episode of Impact Wrestling, with the two promising to clean up the Knockouts division. Both of them were billed as not being under contract with TNA. The following week Jackie and ODB defeated Velvet Sky and Ms. Tessmacher in a tag team match. On June 28 at the tapings of the July 7 episode of Impact Wrestling, Sky defeated both Jackie and ODB in a two-on-one handicap match, forcing both of them out of TNA as per stipulation of the match. However, Jacqueline, along with ODB, returned to Impact Wrestling on July 21, once again attacking Velvet Sky prior to her match with Mickie James for the TNA Women's Knockout Championship. They would eventually be attacked by the returning Traci Brooks, before being escorted out of the arena by police officers. On the August 18 edition of Impact Wrestling, Jacqueline and ODB changed their attitudes, abandoning their villainous antics, in order to first get contracts with the promotion. After several weeks of working as babyfaces, Jacqueline and ODB were signed to contracts by the new head of the Knockouts division, Karen Jarrett, on the August 25 episode of Impact Wrestling, and later teamed with Velvet Sky to defeat Angelina Love, Sarita and Rosita. However, Jacqueline would not make any more appearances, before announcing on November 28 that her TNA contract had expired.

==== Final appearances (2013) ====
Jacqueline returned to TNA on March 17, 2013, at one of their One Night Only pay-per-views, Knockouts Knockdown (which aired on September 6, 2013). Jacqueline began turning heel by trash-talking her opponent, Taryn Terrell, while defeating her to advance to the Gauntlet Battle Royal, where Jacqueline cemented her heel turn by attacking former partner ODB, who later eliminated Jacqueline. Two days later, the villainous Jacqueline faced off against ODB at Hardcore Justice 2 (which aired on July 5, 2013), in a Hardcore match, coming out on the losing end.

=== WWE Hall of Fame and sporadic appearances (2016, 2018, 2024) ===
On March 14, 2016, it was announced that Moore would be inducted into the WWE Hall of Fame class of 2016. At the ceremony on April 2, she was inducted by The Dudley Boyz, and became the first black woman to be inducted. The next night at WrestleMania 32, she appeared while she was introduced as part of the 2016 Hall of Fame class.

On the January 22, 2018, episode of Raw, Jacqueline was honored being "one of the greatest female superstars in the history of WWE" and made a special appearance as part of the 25th anniversary of Raw along with fellow wrestlers and former co-workers; The Bella Twins, Maryse, Kelly Kelly, Lilian Garcia, Torrie Wilson, Michelle McCool, Terri Runnels, Maria Kanellis, and fellow Hall of Famer Trish Stratus. On January 28 at the Royal Rumble, Jacqueline made a surprise entrance at number 21 during the first women's Royal Rumble match, in which she was eliminated by Nia Jax.

Jacqueline appeared at SummerSlam (2024) as a part of the WWE Legends Suite alongside other legends including Diamond Dallas Page and Kevin Nash. On September 6, 2024, it was revealed Jacqueline had signed a legends contract, making her an ambassador for WWE.

== Legacy ==
"She [Moore] was one of those pioneers that really helped the WWE evolve as far as women are concerned".
—Natalya Neidhart during Moore's WWE Hall of Fame promotional video in 2016

Moore is cited as inspiration for several women, such as: Bayley, Bianca Belair, Jade Cargill, Jazz, Naomi, Nicole Savoy, Nyla Rose, Sasha Banks and Trish Adora. Trish Stratus claimed that Moore helped her in the beginning of her wrestling career. She said: "I will always appreciate her patience and her professionalism while showing me the ropes. I learned a lot from her and took away a ton that I used in my wrestling career moving forward". Alicia Fox stated that Moore "recreated what a champion looks like and helped opened the door for women of all colors, sizes and shapes". Jim Ross named Moore as an "MVP that rarely gets talked about".

Some sources consider Moore one of the toughest women's wrestlers to perform in WWE.

== Other media ==
After leaving WWE, Moore began taking acting classes to prepare for a role in an action movie set in Los Angeles during the 1970s.

Jacqueline made her video game debut in the PlayStation version of WCW Nitro. She would later appear in nine WWE video games, which include WWF Attitude, WWF WrestleMania 2000, WWF SmackDown! 2: Know Your Role, WWF No Mercy, WWE WrestleMania X8, WWE Raw 2, WWE 2K17 (as DLC), WWE 2K18 and WWE 2K19.

== Personal life ==
Moore grew up in Dallas, Texas. As a young fan of professional wrestling, Moore stated that the Von Erichs were her favorite wrestlers. She has a third degree black belt in taekwondo and also has experience in kickboxing and boxing.

In mid-2001, Moore, along with Tazz, Al Snow, and Tori, became a trainer on the MTV reality TV series Tough Enough. It was her first time training other wrestlers. On the show, she helped train future WWE wrestlers Nidia and Maven. In 2002, Moore competed on a special WWF superstar edition of Fear Factor, coming in second place to Matt Hardy.

== Championships and accomplishments ==
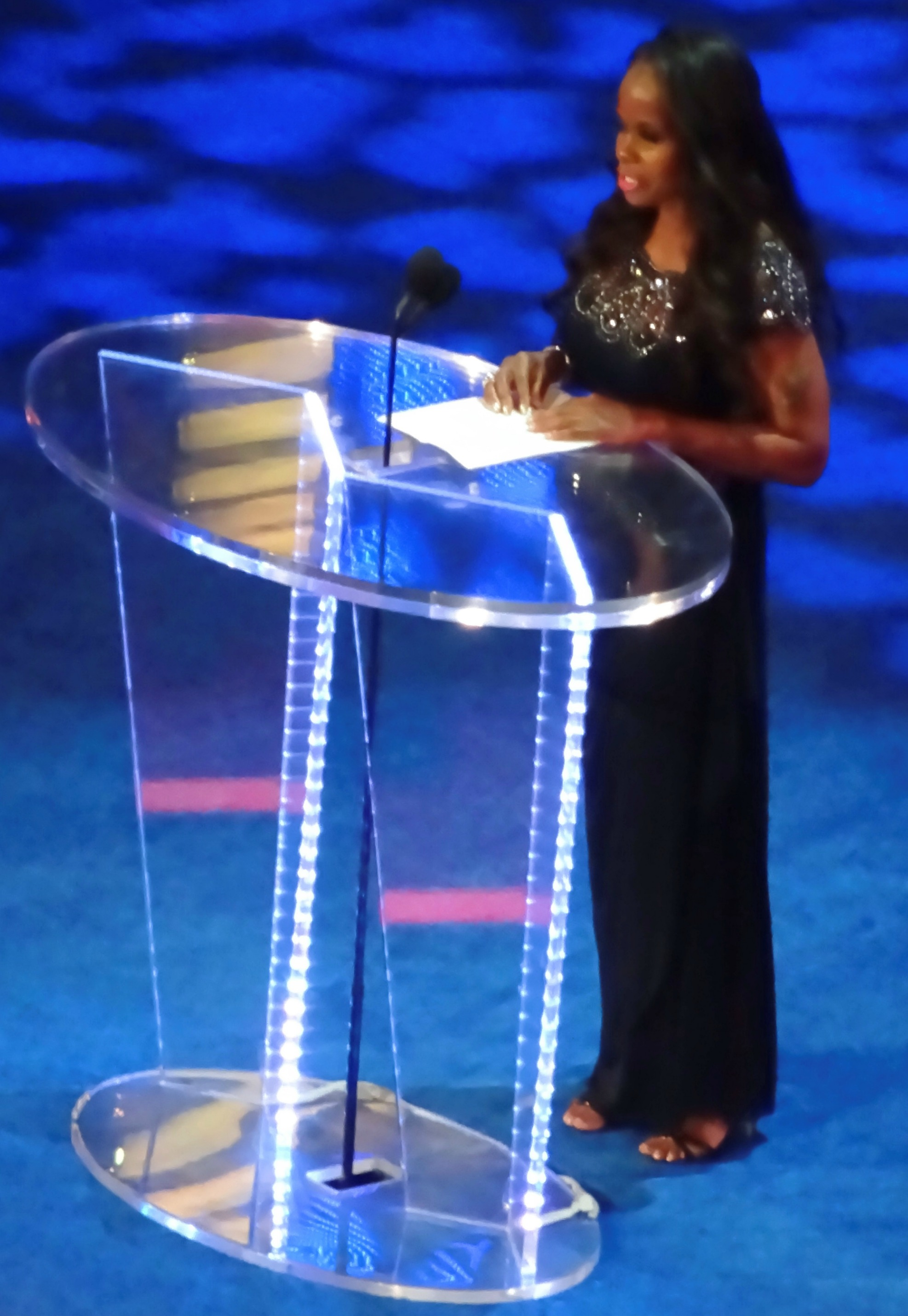
Moore during her speech of induction at the WWE Hall of Fame in April 2016

- Cauliflower Alley Club
  - Women's Wrestling Award (2022)
- Independent Association of Wrestling
  - IAW Women's Championship (1 time)
- Pro Wrestling Illustrated
  - Ranked No. 249 of the top 500 wrestlers in the PWI 500 in 1993
  - Ranked No. 17 of the top 50 female wrestlers in the PWI Female 50 in 2008
- United States Wrestling Association
  - USWA Women's Championship (14 times)
  - USWA Women's Championship Tournament (1992)
- Universal Wrestling Federation
  - UWF Women's World Championship (1 time)
- Women's Wrestling Hall of Fame
  - Class of 2024
- World Wrestling Federation / Entertainment / WWE
  - WWF Women's Championship (2 times)
  - WWE Cruiserweight Championship (1 time)
  - WWE Hall of Fame (Class of 2016)
- World Wrestling Council
  - WWC Women's Championship (1 time)

== Luchas de Apuestas record ==
Winner (wager)	Loser (wager)	Location	Date	Notes
Dirty White Girl (hair)	Miss Texas (hair)	Memphis, Tennessee	August 12, 1991	(Note: Mixed tag team match with Miss Texas and Eric Embry vs. Dirty White Girl and Jeff Jarrett)
Miss Texas (hair)	Lauren Davenport (title)	Memphis, Tennessee	November 23, 1992	(Note: Miss Texas' hair vs. Davenport's USWA Women's Championship)
Miss Texas (hair)	Uptown Karen (hair)	Memphis, Tennessee	June 5, 1995	(Note: Non-title match)
