= Pretty Mean Sisters =

Professional wrestling stable

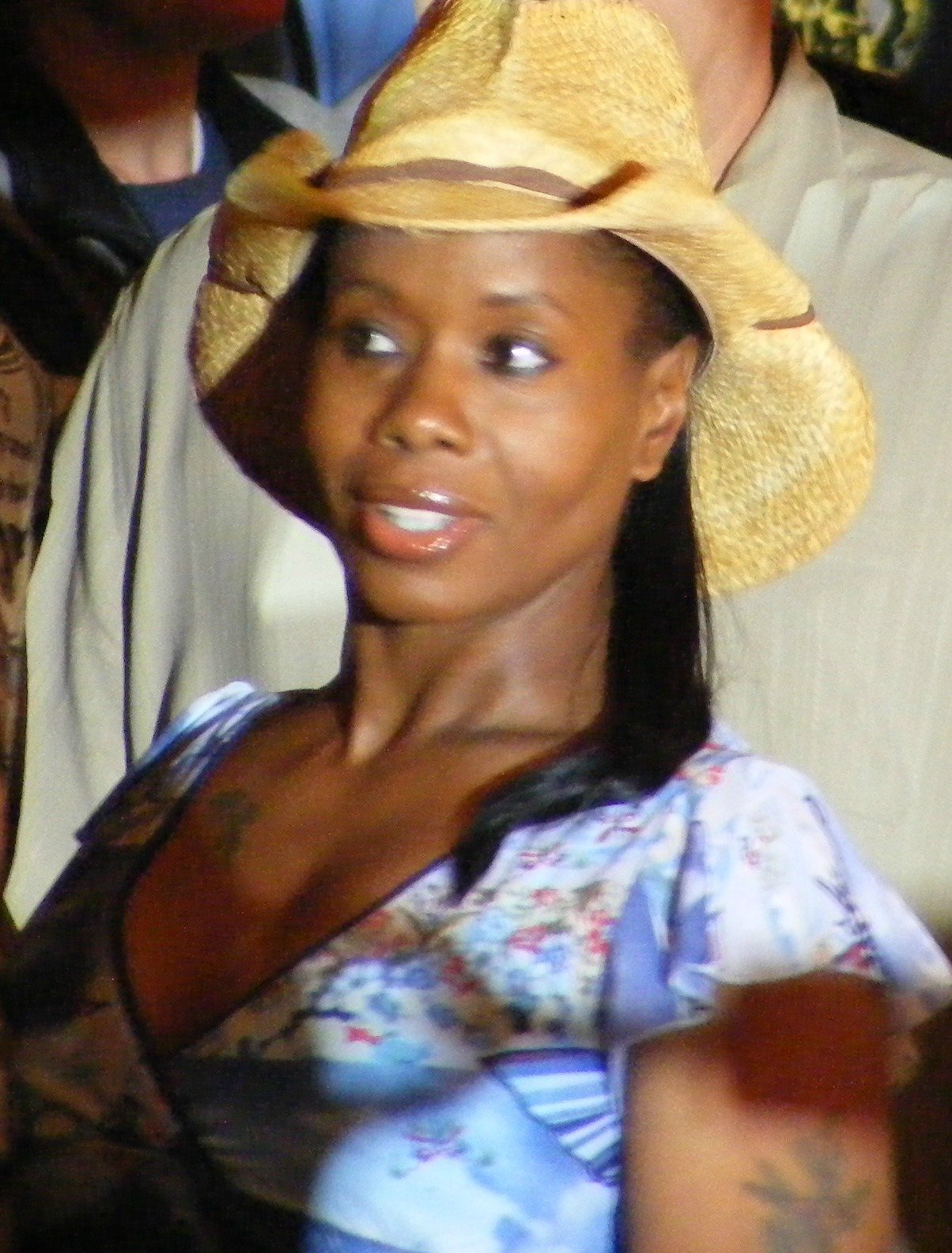
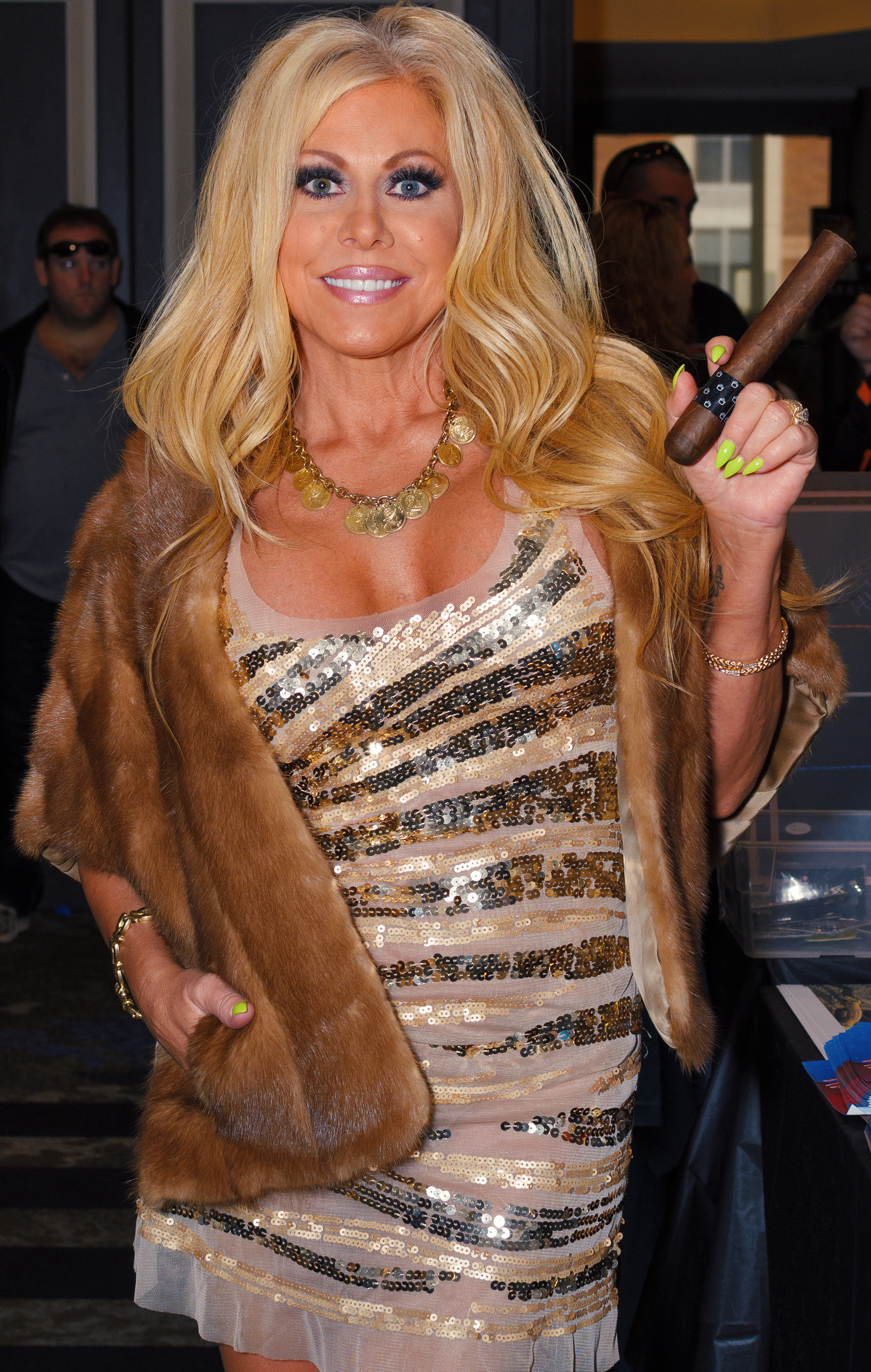
- The two main leaders of the stable Terri (right) Jacqueline (left)

Stable
- Members: Terri; Jacqueline; Ryan Shamrock; Meat
- Name(s): Pretty Mean Sisters; P.M.S.
- Debut: November 1998
- Years active: 1998–1999

Pretty Mean Sisters (P.M.S.) was a villainous female stable in the World Wrestling Federation in the late 1990s, consisting of Terri, Jacqueline, and Ryan Shamrock.

== History ==
=== Formation ===
Jacqueline and Marc Mero separated on the November 22 episode of Sunday Night Heat, and the jilted Jacqueline formed a new stable of women known as the Pretty Mean Sisters (a pun on "PMS") with Terri Runnels, who was separated from her husband, Goldust. During a match between Mero and Goldust on the November 23 episode of Raw, Jacqueline and Terri entered the ring and low-blowed both men.

Vince Russo was the creator of the storyline, which Terri Runnels originally fought him about doing.

=== Rivalries ===
Terri also claimed to be pregnant with new boyfriend, Val Venis's baby, but when he found out about the news, he dumped her. They later formed an alliance with D'Lo Brown and Mark Henry, accompanying them to the ring for a match against Venis and The Godfather in December at Rock Bottom: In Your House. In January, Terri claimed to have suffered a miscarriage after she was knocked off of the ring apron by Brown. The guilty Brown became a servant to PMS, who forced him to wrestle his friend, Mark Henry. The deception lasted until February 1, when the ringside doctor told Brown that Terri had not been pregnant. PMS then feuded with Brown by costing him matches and attacking his new manager, Ivory. Jacqueline returned to the women's division in March, and on the April 12 episode of Raw Is War, she, Ivory, Tori, and Sable took part in a four way match for the Women's Championship. The match was declared a no-contest after Sable's bodyguard Nicole Bass stormed the ring and chokeslammed the three challengers.

=== Addition of Meat ===
PMS gained a "love slave" named Meat (Shawn Stasiak), because he was "nothing more than a piece of meat", in May. In the same month, the stable expanded once more to incorporate Ryan Shamrock, who had been spurned by the womanizing Val Venis, but she left both the stable and the WWF in the following months. As a part of the storyline, the three women used Meat for his body, forcing him to have sex with them. Also, they would force him to do their bidding and wear wrestling tights that resembled a pair of tight underwear. After Shamrock left the WWF, Terri and Jacqueline continued to assist Meat in his matches. Tension began to grow between the two women as Terri, in storyline, exhausted Meat with hours of sex before his matches and then berated her fatigued lover when he lacked the energy to win matches. Jacqueline left the stable after Terri forced Meat to kiss her feet on the August 1 episode of Sunday Night Heat.
