= Debbie Combs =

American professional wrestler (born 1959)

Personal information
- Born: Deborah Szostecki; April 18, 1959 (age 67) Nashville, Tennessee, U.S.

Professional wrestling career
- Ring name(s): Darling Debbie; Debbie Dahl; Debbie Combs; Lady Satan; Princess Dee
- Trained by: Cora Combs
- Debut: 1975
- Retired: 2000

Deborah Szostecki (born April 18, 1959) is an American retired professional wrestler better known as Debbie Combs.

== Early life ==
Her mother, Cora Combs, was also a professional wrestler. Debbie Combs made her wrestling debut at Louisville Gardens for Angelo Poffo's International Championship Wrestling (ICW) at the age of 16 in a seven-women battle royal where she was the first eliminated. Combs dated Randy Savage for five years while they were both working for ICW.

== Career ==
=== Early Career (1975-1986) ===
Combs made her professional wrestling debut in 1975 at 16 years old in Cincinnati, Ohio. During the 1970s and early 1980s she worked for World Wrestling Association in Indianapolis. Worked in many territories during her career.

=== American Wrestling Association (1980, 1985, 1988) ===
She also competed in the American Wrestling Association (AWA) in 1980. Upon joining the promotion, Combs wrestled against Sherri Martel as a babyface in 1988, but later turned heel and became tag team partners with Madusa Miceli. The duo feuded with Heidi Lee Morgan and Brandi Mae.

=== World Wrestling Federation (1986-1987) ===
Combs worked for the World Wrestling Federation from 1986–1987, where she challenged for the WWF Women's Championship against The Fabulous Moolah and Sherri Martel.

=== National Wrestling Alliance (1986-1989) ===
She also worked in the National Wrestling Alliance (NWA) and is a former NWA World Women's Champion. She originally won the title by winning a battle royal in Honolulu, Hawaii in spring 1986. At some point, she was no longer recognized as the champion and defeated Penny Mitchell to become the champion again in Kansas City, Missouri on April 10, 1987. The Kansas City promotion withdrew from NWA in 1987 and closed in 1988. The NWA vacated Combs' title and awarded Misty Blue Simmes the reinstated NWA United States Women's Championship (a replacement of the prior NWA World Women's Championship held by Combs). Combs challenged Simmes to a title match at a Delta Tiger Lilies card in 1989, but Simmes was unable to accept due to an arm injury she had sustained.

=== Return to WWF (1994) ===
After leaving the promotion, she later returned to the WWF in 1994 to challenge Alundra Blayze. She wrestled Blayze once on an episode of Wrestling Challenge and was scheduled to face her at WrestleMania X, but was replaced by Leilani Kai.

=== Return to World Championship Wrestling (1996-1997) ===
Combs briefly competed in World Championship Wrestling (WCW) in 1996 during their brief attempt at a women's division. On the March 31, 1997 edition of WCW Monday Nitro, Combs lost to WCW Women's Champion Akira Hokuto.

=== Women's Pro Wrestling ===
In the early 1990s, she was also president and booker of Women's Pro Wrestling (WPW), an all-women's promotion that produced direct-to-video matches. Her organization featured "Awesome" Ondi Austin, Babyface Nellie, Bambi, Candi Devine, Denise Storm, Jackie Moore, Lady Justice, Lisa Starr, Malia Hosaka, Olympia Hartauer, Peggy Lee Leather, Penelope Paradise, Penny Mitchell, Sandy Partelow, Susan Green, and Velvet McIntyre.

=== After Wrestling ===
Since her retirement, Debbie Combs has worked as a booking processor with the Davidson County Sheriff's Office in Nashville, TN.

== Championships and accomplishments ==
- American Wrestling Federation
  - AWF Women's Championship (1 time)
- Cauliflower Alley Club
  - Other honoree (1992)
- International Wrestling Association
  - IWA Women's Championship (3 times)
- NWA Central States Wrestling
  - NWA World Women's Championship (1 time)
- Music City Wrestling
  - MCW Women's Championship (1 time)
- North American All-Star Wrestling
  - NAASW Women's Championship (1 time)
- Peach State Wrestling
  - NWA World Women's Championship (1 time)
- Professional Wrestling Hall of Fame and Museum
  - Class of 2020
- Southern States Wrestling
  - NWA World Women's Championship (1 time)
- St. Louis Wrestling Hall of Fame
  - Class of 2019
- Ultimate Championship Wrestling
  - UCW Women's Championship (1 time)
- United States Wrestling Association
  - USWA Women's Championship (2 times)
- World Wrestling Alliance
  - WWA Women's Championship (1 time)
- Other titles
  - AAWF Ladies' Championship (1 time)
  - SSWF Women's Championship (1 time)
  - WWWA Women's Championship (1 time)
