= Daivari =

Daivari (Persian: داوری), also spelled Davari, is a Persian surname. Notable people with the surname include:

- Ariya Daivari (born 1989), Iranian-American professional wrestler
- Shawn Daivari (born 1984), Iranian-American professional wrestler, brother of Ariya
