= USWA Women's Championship =

Professional wrestling women's championship

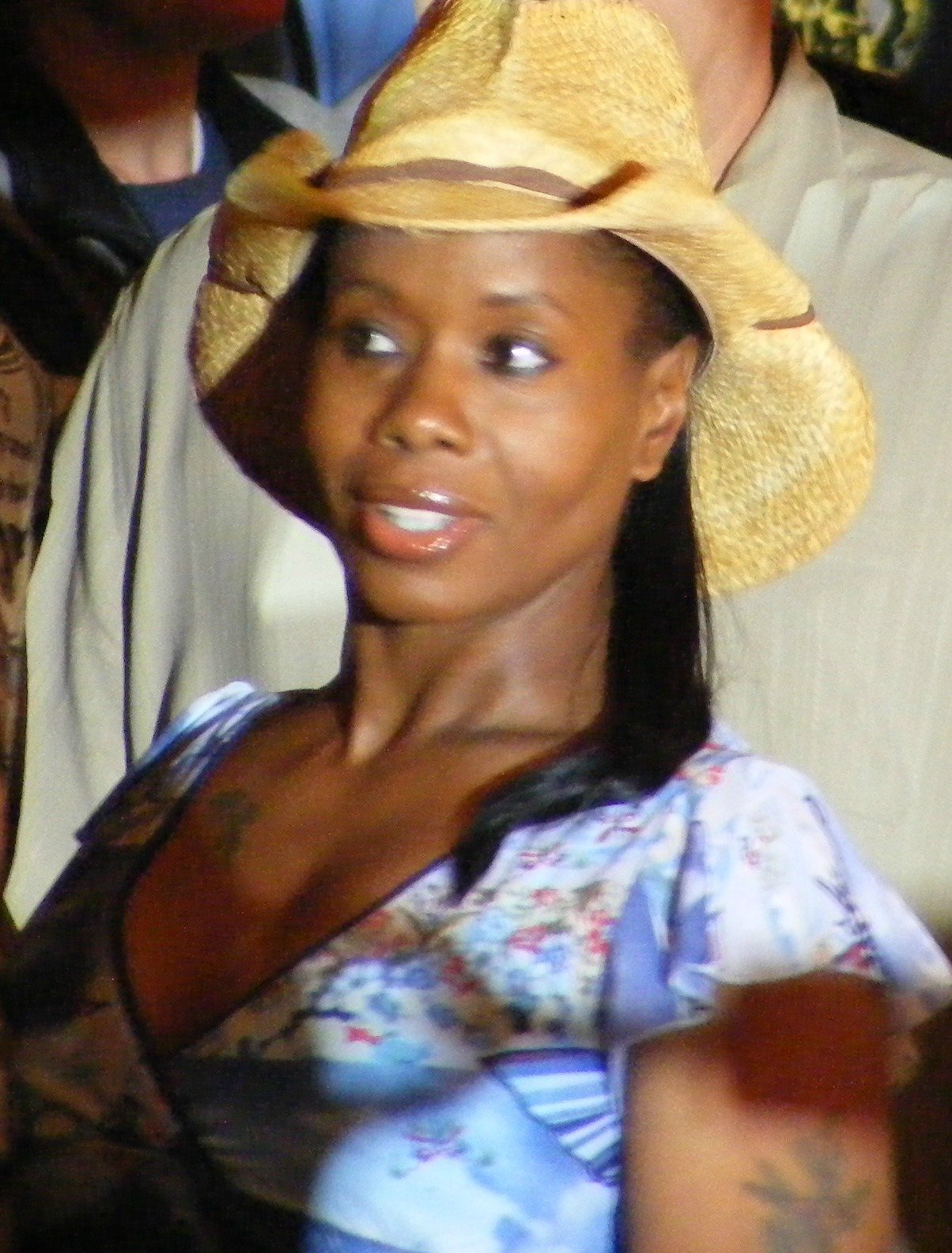
- Miss Texas, 14-time champion

Details
- Promotion: United States Wrestling Association
- Date established: March 2, 1992
- Date retired: November 1997
Statistics
- First champion: Miss Texas
- Final champion: Tasha Simone
- Most reigns: Miss Texas (14 reigns)
- Longest reign: Debbie Combs (233 days)
- Shortest reign: Tasha Simone (1 second)

The USWA Women's Championship was a women's professional wrestling title in the American professional wrestling promotion, the United States Wrestling Association.

== Title history ==
Key
No.	Overall reign number
Reign	Reign number for the specific champion
Days	Number of days held

No.	Champion	Championship change			Reign statistics		Notes	Ref.
No.	Champion	Date	Event	Location	Reign	Days	Notes	Ref.
1	Miss Texas	March 2, 1992	USWA show	Memphis, TN	1	42	Defeated Dirty White Girl in a tournament final to become the first champion.	
2	Lauren Davenport	April 13, 1992	USWA show	Memphis, TN	1	7		
3	Dirty White Girl	April 20, 1992	USWA show	Memphis, TN	1	7		
4	Lauren Davenport	April 27, 1992	USWA show	Memphis, TN	2	119		
5	Miss Texas	August 24, 1992	USWA show	Memphis, TN	2	28		
6	Moondog Fifi	September 21, 1992	USWA show	Memphis, TN	1	26		
7	Miss Texas	October 17, 1992	USWA show	Memphis, TN	3	16		
8	Lauren Davenport	November 2, 1992	USWA show	Memphis, TN	3	21		
9	Miss Texas	November 23, 1992	USWA show	Memphis, TN	4	14		
10	Leslie Belanger	December 7, 1992	USWA show	Memphis, TN	1	54		
11	Miss Texas	January 30, 1993	USWA show	Nashville, TN	5	58	On April 19 Sensational Sherri defeated Miss Texas for the title; however, the decision was later reversed and the title was returned to Miss Texas.	
12	Lauren Davenport	March 29, 1993	USWA show	Memphis, TN	4	5		
13	Miss Texas	April 3, 1993	USWA show	Memphis, TN	6	121		
14	Luna Vachon	August 2, 1993	USWA show	Memphis, TN	1	21		
15	Miss Texas	August 23, 1993	USWA show	Memphis, TN	7	63		
16	Sweet Georgia Brown	October 25, 1993	USWA show	Memphis, TN	1	63		
17	Lauren Davenport	December 27, 1993	USWA show	Memphis, TN	5	103		
18	Debbie Combs	April 9, 1994	USWA show	Memphis, TN	1	104	Awarded the title When Davenport leaves USWA.	
19	Candi Devine	July 22, 1994	USWA show	Inez, KY	1	136	May not to have been a title match.	
20	Miss Texas	December 5, 1994	USWA show	Memphis, TN	8	35	Match is also for the UWF Women's title.	
21	Sweet Georgia Brown	January 9, 1995	USWA show	Memphis, TN	2	7		
22	Miss Texas	January 16, 1995	USWA show	Memphis, TN	9	63		
23	Sweet Georgia Brown	March 20, 1995	USWA show	Memphis, TN	3	7		
24	Miss Texas	March 27, 1995	USWA show	Memphis, TN	10	21		
25	Uptown Karen	April 17, 1995	USWA show	Memphis, TN	1	7		
26	Miss Texas	April 24, 1995	USWA show	Memphis, TN	11	218		
27	Tasha Simone	November 28, 1995	USWA show	Memphis, TN	1	22	The championship was reactivated and Simone announced as champion.	
28	Miss Texas	December 20, 1995	USWA show	Memphis, TN	12	21		
29	Lady Satan	January 10, 1996	USWA show	Memphis, TN	2	5	Debbie Combs was wearing a mask	
30	Miss Texas	January 15, 1996	USWA show	Memphis, TN	13	91		
31	Samantha	April 15, 1996	USWA show	Memphis, TN	1	130		
32	Miss Texas	August 23, 1996	USWA show	Memphis, TN	14	73		
33	Tasha Simone	November 4, 1996	USWA show	Memphis, TN	2	4		
—	Deactivated	November 11, 1996	—	—	—	—	The championship was retired when Simone left the promotion; USWA closed on September 15, 1997.	

== Combined reigns ==
Rank	Wrestler	No. of reigns	Combined days held
1	Miss Texas	14	864
2	Lauren Davenport	5	255
3	Candi Devine	1	136
4	Samantha	1	130
5	Debbie Combs/Lady Satan	2	109
6	Sweet Georgia Brown	3	77
7	Leslie Belanger	1	54
8	Moondog Fifi	1	26
9	Luna Vachon	1	27
10	Tasha Simone	2	23
11	Dirty White Girl	1	7
11	Uptown Karen	1	7

== See also ==
- United States Wrestling Association
