= Hana Kimura Memorial Show 3 =

2023 Japanese wrestling event

- Promotional poster featuring Hana Kimura
- Date: May 23, 2023
- City: Tokyo, Japan
- Venue: Korakuen Hall
- Attendance: 687
- Tagline: Pinx!

Hana Kimura Memorial Show chronology
← Previous; Hana Kimura Memorial Show 2	Next → Hana Kimura Memorial Show 4

The Hana Kimura Memorial Show 3 (木村花メモリアルマッチ『ピンクス』, Kimura Hana Memoriaru Matchi "Pinx!" 3) was the third Japanese professional wrestling memorial show and pay-per-view event promoted by Kyoko Kimura to commemorate the three-year anniversary of the death of her daughter Hana Kimura, who committed suicide on May 23, 2020. The event took place on May 23, 2023, at Korakuen Hall in Tokyo, Japan.

== Production ==
=== Background ===
On May 23, 2020, Hana Kimura committed suicide at age 22. Early that morning, Kimura posted self-harm images on Twitter and Instagram while sharing some of the hateful comments she received. In late 2020 and early 2021, the Tokyo Metropolitan Police arrested and charged multiple men for the cyberbullying that contributed to Hana's death.

=== Event ===
At the beginning of the event, Kyoko Kimura and Jungle Kyona addressed the crowd as the event kicked off.

The card started with the confrontation between one half of the Daily Sports Women's Tag Team Champions Miyuki Takase and one third of the Artist of Stardom Champions Saori Anou solded with the victory of the latter. Next up, Diana Queen Elizabeth Champion Jaguar Yokota won the traditional battle royal, bout which also featured notable opponents, both male and female such as the Pure-J Openweight Champion Hanako Nakamori, one half of the Sendai Girls Tag Team Champions Chihiro Hashimoto, one half of the BJW Tag Team Champions Fuminori Abe, and many others. In the third bout, Sakura Hirota cosplayed Hana Kimura, representing the latter's time in the Tokyo Cyber Squad stable, as she unsuccessfully faced NJPW's Minoru Suzuki in singles competition. In the fourth bout, Sonoko Kato and Ryo Mizunami defeated Ram Kaicho and Yuko Miyamoto, Kengo and Minoru Tanaka, and Mayumi Ozaki and Masato Hanahata in a four-way tag team match. After the match concluded, Shotaro Ashino stepped up in the ring and awarded Mizunami a pair of sunglasses as a trophy. Next up, Hana Kimura's former Tokyo Cyber Squad stablemates and Stardom roster members Death Yama-san, Konami and Rina fell short to Asuka, Syuri and Natsupoi in six-woman tag team action.

In the main event, Aja Kong and Sareee defeated Mika Iwata and Mio Momono. In the final moments of the show, a tribute video for Hana Kimura was aired, with various wrestlers such as Will Ospreay, Mercedes Moné, Kairi, Io Shirai, Cima, Zoe Lucas, Kris Wolf and many others paid tribute for Hana, reciting the word "Pinx".

== Results ==
No.	Results	Stipulations	Times
1	Saori Anou defeated Miyuki Takase	Singles match	9:55
2	Jaguar Yokota won by last eliminating Fuminori Abe (Note: The other participants were Super Delfin, Kaz Hayashi, Chihiro Hashimoto, Hanako Nakamori, Kyoko Inoue, Hagane Shinno, Tsutomu Oosugi, Menso-re Oyaji, Hibiscus Mii and Munenori Sawa.)	12-person battle royal	12:38
3	Minoru Suzuki defeated Kyuusei Hana Kimura	Singles match	9:39
4	Sonoko Kato and Ryo Mizunami defeated Ram Kaicho and Yuko Miyamoto, Kengo and Minoru Tanaka, and Mayumi Ozaki and Masao Hanabatake	Four-way tag team match	15:27
5	Asuka, Syuri and Natsupoi defeated Death Yama-san, Konami and Rina	Six-woman tag team match	13:09
6	Aja Kong and Sareee defeated Mika Iwata and Mio Momono	Tag team match	19:48
