= Hana Kimura Memorial Show 6 =

2026 Japanese wrestling event

- Promotional poster featuring Hana Kimura
- Date: May 23, 2026
- City: Tokyo, Japan
- Venue: Korakuen Hall
- Attendance: 487
- Tagline: Hanur

Hana Kimura Memorial Show chronology
← Previous; Hana Kimura Memorial Show 5	Next → —

The Hana Kimura Memorial Show 6 (木村花メモリアルマッチ『ハヌール』, Kimura Hana Memoriaru Matchi "Hanur" 6) was the sixth Japanese professional wrestling memorial show and pay-per-view event promoted by Kyoko Kimura to commemorate the five-year anniversary of the death of her daughter Hana Kimura, who committed suicide on May 23, 2020. The event took place on May 23, 2026, at Korakuen Hall in Tokyo, Japan. The event will air domestically on Triller TV.

== Production ==
=== Background ===
On May 23, 2020, Hana Kimura committed suicide at age 22. Early that morning, Kimura posted self-harm images on Twitter and Instagram while sharing some of the hateful comments she received. In late 2020 and early 2021, the Tokyo Metropolitan Police arrested and charged multiple men for the cyberbullying that contributed to Hana's death.

=== Event ===
The event started with the singles confrontation between Yuna and Zones, which ended with the victory of the latter. Next up, Fuminori Abe and Seigo Tachibana picked up a victory over Death Yama-san and Ram Kaicho in tag team competition. Next up, Hanako Nakamori defeated Yuko Miyamoto in singles competition. In the fourth bout, Unagi Sayaka defeated Sakura Hirota in another singles bout. Next up, Cherry, Maruko and Super Delfin outmatched Banana Senga, Hayate and Tsutomu Oosugi in a six-man tag team competition. In the semi-main event, Aja Kong, Shotaro Ashino and Shuji Kondo wrestled into a draw.

In the main event, Konami, Rina and Veny defeated Jungle Kyona, Mika Iwata and Mio Momono in six-woman tag team competition.

== Results ==
No.	Results	Stipulations	Times
1	Zones defeated Yuna by pinfall	Singles match	7:21
2	Fuminori Abe and Seigo Tachibana defeated Death Yama-san and Ram Kaicho by pinfall	Tag team match	9:11
3	Hanako Nakamori (with Kyoko Kimura) defeated Yuko Miyamoto (with Command Bolshoi) by pinfall	Singles match	7:14
4	Unagi Sayaka defeated Sakura Hirota by pinfall	Singles match	6:26
5	Cherry, Maruko and Super Delfin defeated Banana Senga, Hayate and Tsutomu Oosugi by pinfall	Six-man tag team match	11:08
6	Aja Kong vs. Shotaro Ashino vs. Shuji Kondo ended in a draw	Three-way match	6:53
7	H.A.T.E. (Konami and Rina) and Veny defeated Jungle Kyona, Mika Iwata and Mio Momono by pinfall	Six-woman tag team match	25:06
