= Hana Kimura Memorial Show 5 =

2024 Japanese wrestling event

- Promotional poster featuring Hana Kimura
- Date: May 23, 2025
- City: Tokyo, Japan
- Venue: Korakuen Hall
- Attendance: 545
- Tagline: Hanabi

Hana Kimura Memorial Show chronology
← Previous; Hana Kimura Memorial Show 4	Next → Hana Kimura Memorial Show 6

The Hana Kimura Memorial Show 5 (木村花メモリアルマッチ『花火』, Kimura Hana Memoriaru Matchi "Hanabi" 5) was the fifth Japanese professional wrestling memorial show and pay-per-view event promoted by Kyoko Kimura to commemorate the five-year anniversary of the death of her daughter Hana Kimura, who committed suicide on May 23, 2020. The event took place on May 23, 2025, at Korakuen Hall in Tokyo, Japan. The event aired domestically on Triller TV.

== Production ==
=== Background ===
On May 23, 2020, Hana Kimura committed suicide at age 22. Early that morning, Kimura posted self-harm images on Twitter and Instagram while sharing some of the hateful comments she received. In late 2020 and early 2021, the Tokyo Metropolitan Police arrested and charged multiple men for the cyberbullying that contributed to Hana's death.

=== Event ===
The event started with the singles confrontation between Yuna and Tae Honma, solded with the victory of the latter. Next up, Kaori Yoneyama who wrestled under the Death Yama-San gimmick from the Tokyo Cyber Squad era won the traditional Battle royal by last eliminating Shuji Ishikawa. Next up, the confrontation between Aja Kong and Seigo Tachibana which was originally scheduled to take place under only one singles match spread to three short bouts, each going up to one minute and a half from which Kong emerged victorious by hitting Tachibana spinning backfists for the pinfall. In the sixth bout, Jaguar Yokota defeated Menso-re Oyaji and Shin Sakura Hirota in three-way competition. Next up, Miyuki Takase and Mika Iwata wrestled the teams of Sareee and Natsupoi, and Dash Chisako and Hiroyo Matsumoto into a time-limit draw. In the semi main event, Konami and Minoru Suzuki picked up a victory over Chihiro Hashimoto and Shotaro Ashino in tag team competition.

In the main event, Veny defeated Rina in singles competition.

== Results ==
No.	Results	Stipulations	Times
1	Tae Honma defeated Yuna by submission	Singles match	6:55
2	Death Yama-San won by last eliminating Shuji Ishikawa (Note: Other participants in the match were: Ram Kaicho, Fuminori Abe, Munenori Sawa, Yuka Miyazaki, Banana Senga, Tsutomu Oosugi, Yuko Miyamoto, and Cherry.)	10-person Battle royal	17:00
3	Aja Kong defeated Seigo Tachibana by pinfall	Singles match	1:21
4	Aja Kong defeated Seigo Tachibana by pinfall	Singles match	0:37
5	Aja Kong defeated Seigo Tachibana by pinfall	Singles match	1:37
6	Jaguar Yokota defeated Menso-re Oyaji and Shin Sakura Hirota by pinfall	Three-way match	8:23
7	Red Energy (Miyuki Takase and Mika Iwata) vs. Sareee and Natsupoi vs. Reiwa Ultima Powers (Dash Chisako and Hiroyo Matsumoto) ended in a time-limit draw	Three-way tag team match	15:00
8	Konami and Minoru Suzuki defeated Chihiro Hashimoto and Shotaro Ashino by pinfall	Tag team match	18:40
9	Veny defeated Rina by pinfall	Singles match	17:48
