= Hana Kimura Memorial Show (2021) =

2021 Japanese wrestling event

- Promotional poster featuring Hana Kimura
- Date: May 23, 2021
- City: Tokyo, Japan
- Venue: Korakuen Hall
- Attendance: 714 (Note: The event was held with a limited audience due to the COVID-19 pandemic in Japan.)
- Tagline(s): Matane; See You Again

Hana Kimura Memorial Show chronology
← Previous; First	Next → Hana Kimura Memorial Show 2

The Hana Kimura Memorial Show (木村花メモリアルマッチ『またね』, Kimura Hana Memoriaru Matchi "Matane") was a Japanese professional wrestling memorial show and pay-per-view and the first event promoted by Kyoko Kimura to commemorate the one year anniversary of the death of her daughter Hana Kimura, who committed suicide on May 23, 2020. The event took place on May 23, 2021 at Korakuen Hall in Tokyo, Japan with a limited attendance due to the COVID-19 pandemic. Kagetsu and Hazuki, who both retired in 2019, made one-off in-ring returns at the event, participating in both the semi-main and main event matches.

The event was presented internationally as a live pay-per-view via the FITE TV service, with Ring of Honor's Ian Riccaboni, Sumie Sakai, and World Famous CB serving as the English commentary team during the broadcast.

== Background ==
On May 23, 2020, Hana Kimura committed suicide at age 22. Early that morning, Kimura posted self-harm images on Twitter and Instagram while sharing some of the hateful comments she received. In late 2020 and early 2021, the Tokyo Metropolitan Police arrested and charged multiple men for the cyberbullying that contributed to Hana's death.

In early 2021, Hana's mother Kyoko Kimura announced her intentions to run a memorial show in honor of her late daughter; the event was later scheduled for May 23. On May 7, FITE TV announced that they would be airing the event and that Super Delfin, Hub, Yuko Miyamoto, Munenori Sawa, Kaori Yoneyama, Cherry, Hanako Nakamori, Yuki Miyazaki, Asuka, Mio Momono, and Mika Iwata would be making appearances at the show.

== Event ==
The show began with a concert performed by Japanese performer Hiroko Yamamura – Yamamura was Hana Kimura's favourite DJ and also a former professional wrestler. Ilk Park performed a dance number soundtracked by Awaniko – Awaniko was the idol group that Hana used to be a member of. A video then played showcasing Hana's Ribera jacket entrances from her tenure in Wrestle-1.

Following the main event match, the wrestlers who participated on the card paid tribute to Hana. Hana's mother Kyoko Kimura stood in the ring with a portrait of her and was then joined by Hana's former teammates Asuka and Kagetsu. The three did the Tokyo Cyber Squad pose. This was followed by a fifteen-minute video package that recapped Hana's career from start to finish. The video was followed by a moment of silence and a ten-bell salute, during which the bell was rung by Jungle Kyona. The event concluded with a series of video tributes, notably tributes were sent in by Yoshihiro Tajiri, Keiji Mutoh, The Great Sasuke, WWE wrestlers Io Shirai, Kairi Sane, Meiko Satomura and Xia Brookside as well as All Elite Wrestling's Hikaru Shida and Kenny Omega. The final image of the broadcast was Kyoko saying "Matane" followed by "We love Hana, Hana loves everyone."

== Results ==
No.	Results	Stipulations	Times
1	Hub, Shisaou, and Eisa8 defeated Shota, Fuma and Mil Mongoose	Six-man tag team match	15:57
2	Ram Kaicho won by lastly eliminating Cima and Masato Tanaka (Note: Other battle royal participants included Super Delfin, Miyuki Takase, Mika Iwata, Dash Chisako, Shotaro Ashino, Fuminori Abe, Menso-re Oyaji, Seigo Tachibana, Hagane Shinnou, Yuko Miyamoto, Chihiro Hashimoto, Ram Kaicho, Cherry, Yuki Miyazaki, Hanako Nakamori, Moeka Haruhi, Banana Senga, Gabai Jichan, Lingerie Mutoh, Yusuke Kodama, Aiger, Andras Miyagi, Sakura Hirota, Jun Kasai, and Jinsei Shinzaki.)	28-person All-Star Battle Royal	30:05
3	Asuka, Syuri, Natsupoi, and Mio Momono defeated Oedo Tai (Kagetsu and Hazuki) and Tokyo Cyber Squad (Konami and Death Yama-san)	Eight-woman tag team match	15:54
4	Asuka defeated Kagetsu	Singles match	14:16
