= Hana Kimura Memorial Show 2 =

2022 Japanese wrestling event

- Promotional poster featuring Hana Kimura
- Date: May 23, 2022
- City: Tokyo, Japan
- Venue: Korakuen Hall
- Attendance: 666
- Tagline(s): Bagus; Great

Hana Kimura Memorial Show chronology
← Previous; Hana Kimura Memorial Show	Next → Hana Kimura Memorial Show 3

The Hana Kimura Memorial Show 2 (木村花メモリアルマッチ『またね』, Kimura Hana Memoriaru Matchi "Matane" 2) was the second Japanese professional wrestling memorial show and pay-per-view event promoted by Kyoko Kimura to commemorate the second anniversary of the death of her daughter Hana Kimura, who committed suicide on May 23, 2020. The event took place on May 23, 2022 at Korakuen Hall in Tokyo, Japan with a limited attendance due to the COVID-19 pandemic. The event was broadcast live by FITE TV.

== Background ==
On May 23, 2020, Hana Kimura committed suicide at age 22. Early that morning, Kimura posted self-harm images on Twitter and Instagram while sharing some of the hateful comments she received. In late 2020 and early 2021, the Tokyo Metropolitan Police arrested and charged multiple men for the cyberbullying that contributed to Hana's death.

In January 2022, it was reported that the second memorial show will materialize on further notice. The event was later scheduled for May 23, on the same date as the previous event from 2021. On May 14, 2022, Yu Ishino reached out via YouTube to announce that he will work as an ambassador at the event.

=== Event ===
The show featured former fellow wrestlers of Hana Kimura from World Wonder Ring Stardom such as the then-time World of Stardom Champion and God's Eye leader Syuri and former Tokyo Cyber Squad stablemate Jungle Kyona and Oedo Tai wrestler Rina who was accompanied ringside by Starlight Kid. Kairi, Shota and Ken Suzuki joined the commentary table for the night.

After winning the tag team battle royal, Chihiro Hashimoto and Mika Iwata were handed merchandise portraiting Hana Kimura by Ram Kaicho who won the 2021 battle royal. The show portraited the in-ring return of Jungle Kyona who was sidelined by injury for one and a half year who collided with Kyoko Kimura who came out of retirement for one more match in the honor of her daughter. The main event saw Syuri picking a win over Asuka. In the final moments of the show, a tribute video for Hana Kimura was aired, with various wrestlers such as Meiko Satomura, Kenny Omega, Riho, Nagisa Nozaki, Tajiri and many others paid tribute for Hana, reciting the word "Bagus" (great).

Sakura Hirota reprised her role of the previous 2021 show by dressing up as Hana Kimura in her red and black Oedo Tai ring gear during her series of matches.

== Results ==
No.	Results	Stipulations	Times
1	Kenoh defeated Menso-re Oyaji	Singles match	7:06
2	Sendai Girls (Chihiro Hashimoto and Mika Iwata) won by lastly eliminating Seigo Tachibana and Shotaro Ashino (Note: The other teams involved were Cherry and Masahiro Takanashi, Dash Chisako and Hiroyo Matsumoto, Fuminori Abe and Munenori Sawa, Hanako Nakamori and Tsubasa Kuragaki, Hub and King Shisar, Koji Kanemoto and Ryo Mizunami, Miyuki Takase and Super Delfin, Speed of Sounds (Banana Senga and Tsutomu Oosugi and Yuki Miyazaki and Yuko Miyamoto))	Tag team battle royal	27:16
3	Jungle Kyona defeated Kyoko Kimura	Exhibition match	11:23
4	Sakura Hirota defeated Kaori Yoneyama and Saori Anou	Two-on-one handicap match	6:25
5	Aja Kong defeated Sakura Hirota	Singles match	0:15
6	Aja Kong defeated Sakura Hirota	Singles match	4:52
7	Rina defeated Sakura Hirota	Singles match	7:32
8	Syuri defeated Asuka	Singles match	19:09
