= Hana Kimura Memorial Show 4 =

2024 Japanese wrestling event

- Promotional poster featuring Hana Kimura
- Date: May 23, 2024
- City: Tokyo, Japan
- Venue: Korakuen Hall
- Attendance: 632
- Tagline: Terimakasih

Hana Kimura Memorial Show chronology
← Previous; Hana Kimura Memorial Show 3	Next → Hana Kimura Memorial Show 5

The Hana Kimura Memorial Show 4 (木村花メモリアルマッチ『テリマカシ』, Kimura Hana Memoriaru Matchi "Terimakasih" 4) was the fourth Japanese professional wrestling memorial show and pay-per-view event promoted by Kyoko Kimura to commemorate the four-year anniversary of the death of her daughter Hana Kimura, who committed suicide on May 23, 2020. The event took place on May 23, 2024, at Korakuen Hall in Tokyo, Japan.

The event was announced on Kyoko Kimura's YouTube channel on April 13, 2024.

== Production ==
=== Background ===
On May 23, 2020, Hana Kimura committed suicide at age 22. Early that morning, Kimura posted self-harm images on Twitter and Instagram while sharing some of the hateful comments she received. In late 2020 and early 2021, the Tokyo Metropolitan Police arrested and charged multiple men for the cyberbullying that contributed to Hana's death.

=== Event ===
The event started with the singles confrontation between Sendai Girls' Pro Wrestling's Yuna and the time's Future of Stardom Champion Rina, solded with the victory of the latter. Next up, Sakura Hirota last eliminated Cherry to win the traditional battle royal. The third bout saw Aja Kong, Ram Kaicho and Jinsei Shinzaki picking up a victory over Super Delfin, Super Shisa and Menso-re Oyaji in six-person tag team competition. The fourth bout saw Yuko Miyamoto and Dash Chisako defeating Masato Tanaka and Ryo Mizunami in a Hardcore tag team match. The fifth match saw Mika Iwata, Chihiro Hashimoto and Miyuki Takase who represented Sendai Girls defeating Syuri, Konami and the time's Wonder of Stardom Champion Saori Anou who represented Stardom, and Kaori Yoneyama, Sareee and Mio Momono in a three-way six-woman tag team match.

In the main event, Dream Star Fighting Marigold's Utami Hayashishita defeated Pro Wrestling Wave's Veny in singles competition.

== Results ==
No.	Results	Stipulations	Times
1	Rina defeated Yuna	Singles match	9:49
2	Sakura Hirota won by last eliminating Cherry (Note: The match also involved Tatsuhito Senga, Tsutomu Oosugi, Fuminori Abe, Munenori Sawa,. Shotaro Ashino, Seigo Tachibana, Hanako Nakamori, Tsukasa Fujimoto and Yumiko Hotta.)	11-person battle royal	16:23
3	Aja Kong, Ram Kaicho and Jinsei Shinzaki defeated Super Delfin, Super Shisa and Menso-re Oyaji	Six-person tag team match	11:43
4	Yuko Miyamoto and Dash Chisako defeated Masato Tanaka and Ryo Mizunami	Hardcore tag team match	15:48
5	Mika Iwata, Chihiro Hashimoto and Miyuki Takase defeated God's Eye (Syuri and Konami) and Saori Anou, and Kaori Yoneyama, Sareee and Mio Momono	Three-way six-woman tag team match	10:38
6	Utami Hayashishita defeated Veny (Note: Hayashishita was originally scheduled to face Giulia, but the latter was pulled from the match due to a fractured arm injury.)	Singles match	16:31
