= Hana Kimura Memorial Show =

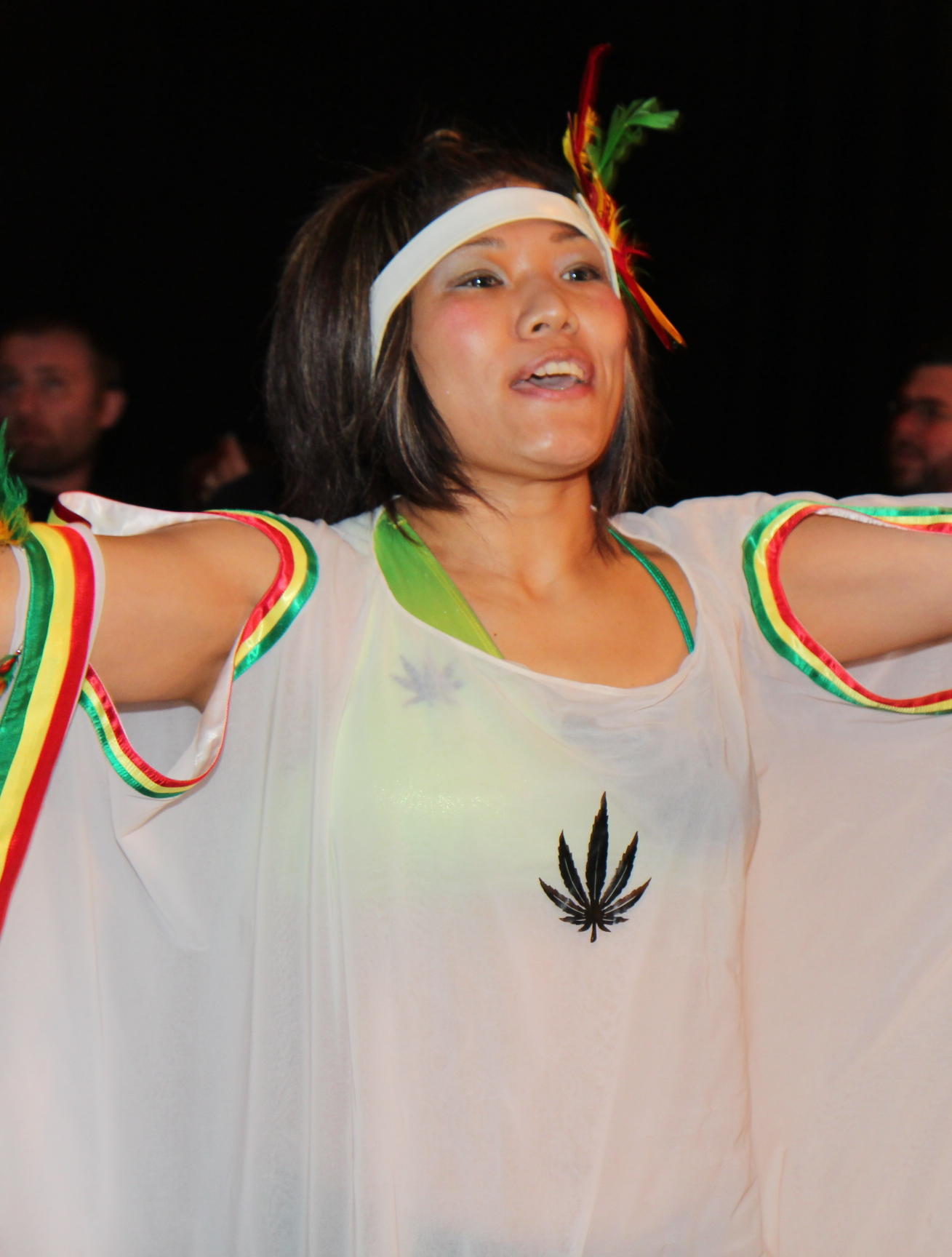
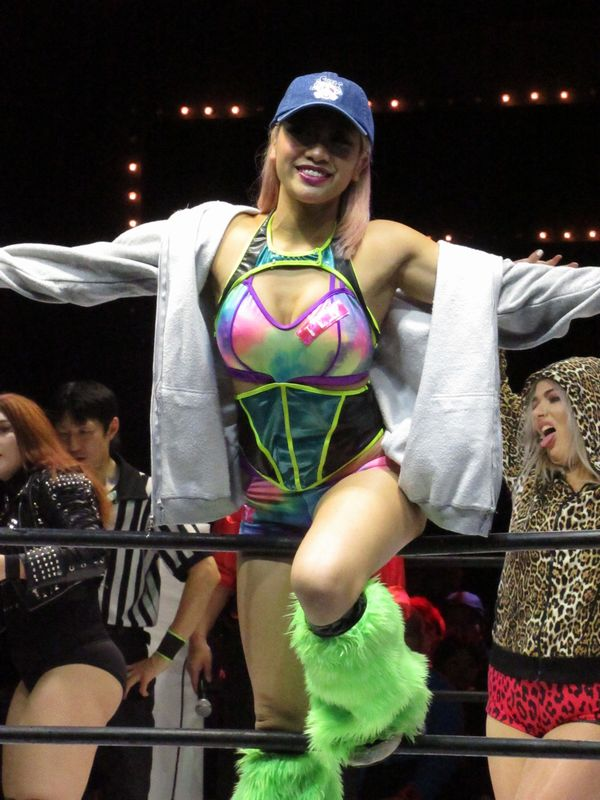
- The creator of the Hana Kimura Memorial Show Hana's mother Kyoko Kimura (left) and Hana Kimura (right).
- Created by: Kyoko Kimura
- First event: Hana Kimura Memorial Show (2021)

The Hana Kimura Memorial Show is an annual professional wrestling memorial show and pay-per-view event promoted by Kyoko Kimura to commemorate the anniversary of the death of her daughter Hana Kimura, who committed suicide on May 23, 2020. Since its inception in 2021, it has taken place on May 23, at Korakuen Hall in Tokyo, Japan. The annual event is broadcast live by FITE TV.

== Production ==
=== Background ===
On May 23, 2020, Hana Kimura committed suicide at age 22. Early that morning, Kimura posted self-harm images on Twitter and Instagram while sharing some of the hateful comments she received. In late 2020 and early 2021, the Tokyo Metropolitan Police arrested and charged multiple men for the cyberbullying that contributed to Hana's death.

The first event took place on May 23, 2021 at Korakuen Hall in Tokyo, Japan, where the annual event has been held since its inception. The second event took place on May 23, 2022, establishing the Hana Kimura Memorial Show as an annual event.

=== Further remembering Hana Kimura ===
Hana Kimura joined the Ring of Honor when she debuted against Sumie Sakai in the inaugural Women of Honor Championship tournament in 2018. She was also known for having a little more matches in the ROH Women of Honor division before her separation from the company.

The creator of the Hana Kimura memorial show is her mother Kyoko Kimura, who made her Ring of Honor debut in ROH in 2016 in a Six Women Tag Team Match with Veda Scott and Taeler Hendrix vs. Sumie Sakai, Mandy Leon, and Jenny Rose, in which Sumie Sakai pinned Taeler Hendrix via roll-up.

== Dates and venues ==
#	Event	Date	City	Attendance	Venue	Main Event	Ref
1	Hana Kimura Memorial Show	May 23, 2021	Tokyo, Japan	714	Korakuen Hall	Asuka vs. Kagetsu	
2	Hana Kimura Memorial Show 2	May 23, 2022	Tokyo, Japan	666	Korakuen Hall	Syuri vs. Asuka	
3	Hana Kimura Memorial Show 3	May 23, 2023	Tokyo, Japan	687	Korakuen Hall	Aja Kong and Sareee vs. Mika Iwata and Mio Momono	
4	Hana Kimura Memorial Show 4	May 23, 2024	Tokyo, Japan	632	Korakuen Hall	Utami Hayashishita vs. Veny	
5	Hana Kimura Memorial Show 5	May 23, 2025	Tokyo, Japan	545	Korakuen Hall	Rina vs. Veny	
6	Hana Kimura Memorial Show 6	May 23, 2026	Tokyo, Japan	TBA	Korakuen Hall	H.A.T.E. (Konami and Rina) and Veny vs. Jungle Kyona, Mika Iwata and Mio Momono	

== See also ==
- Thuy Trang
