= Terrace House: Tokyo 2019–2020 =

Japanese reality television series

- The initial cast of Terrace House: Tokyo 2019–2020.
- Genre: Reality
- Presented by: You, Reina Triendl, Yoshimi Tokui, Azusa Babazono, Ryota Yamasato, Shono Hayama
- Opening theme: Japan: "Graves" by Chvrches; International: "Divers in a Hurricane" by Eleventyseven
- Ending theme: Japan: "Chasing Cars" by Snow Patrol; International: "No Guarantees" by Sammy Isaac
- Country of origin: Japan
- Original language: Japanese

Production
- Production location: Japan
- Production company: Fuji Television

Original release
- Network: Fuji TV (Japan); Netflix (international)
- Release: May 14, 2019 – May 19, 2020

Related
- Terrace House: Opening New Doors

Terrace House: Tokyo 2019–2020 (Japanese: テラスハウス Tokyo 2019-2020, Hepburn: Terasu Hausu Tōkyō Nī Zero Ichi Kyū Nī Zero Nī Zero) is a Japanese reality television series and the fifth installment of the Terrace House franchise. It follows three men and three women as they temporarily live together in a house in the Setagaya ward of Tokyo, Japan. It premiered on Netflix Japan as a Netflix Original on May 14, 2019.

In April 2020, the production of the show was halted due to the COVID-19 pandemic in Japan. The show resumed airing episodes that were filmed prior to the suspension of production in May 2020, but the release of new episodes was again suspended following the suicide of cast member Hana Kimura on May 23, 2020.

Following Kimura's death, Fuji Television announced their decision to cancel the season on May 27, 2020, leaving the final two produced episodes of the show unaired. Netflix removed the season from its searchable database in Japan in mid-2020 and pulled all episodes featuring Kimura on August 10, 2020 in international markets.

== Cast ==
=== Main cast ===
No.	Name			Occupation	Birth date	Age*	Appearance	
No.	English	Japanese	Nickname	Occupation	Birth date	Age*	Eps	#
01	Kaori Watanabe	渡邉香織		Illustrator	June 25, 1990	28	01 - 20	20
02	Shohei Matsuzaki	松嵜翔平		Actor/Writer	October 9, 1993	25	01 - 18	18
03	Haruka Okuyama	奥山春花		Actress	March 24, 1995	24	01 - 25	25
04	Kenji Yoshihara	吉原健司	Kenny	Musician	June 2, 1987	31	01 - 14	14
05	Risako Tanabe	田辺莉咲子		Fitness trainer	January 14, 1998	21	01 - 14	14
06	Ruka Nishinoiri	西野入流佳		Part-timer	December 1, 1998	20	01 - 25	25
07	Emika Mizukoshi	水越愛華		University student	February 1, 1998	21	14 - 34	21
08	Giuseppe Durato	デュラト・ジュゼッペ	Peppe	Manga artist	December 24, 1992	27	14 - 26	13
09	Ryo Tawatari	田渡凌		Basketball player (Yokohama B-Corsairs)	June 29, 1993	26	18 - 32	15
10	Hana Kimura	木村花		Professional wrestler	September 3, 1997	21	20 - 42	23
11	Violetta Razdumina	ラズドゥミナ・ヴィオレッタ	Vivi	Aspiring actress	October 4, 1995	24	26 - 42	17
12	Kai Kobayashi	小林快		Comedian	August 15, 1994	25	26 - 39	14
13	John Kimverlu Tupas	トパス ジョンキンバルー	Tupas	Lily Franky's personal assistant	January 13, 1997	22	26 - 34	9
14	Toshiyuki Niino	新野俊幸	Shachō (社長, "Boss")	CEO of EXIT Inc.	October 21, 1989	30	33 - 42	10
15	Yume Hayashi	林ゆめ		Office worker/Gravure model	October 18, 1995	24	34 - 42	9
16	Shion Suzuki	鈴木志遠		University student	February 1, 1997	22	34 - 42	9
17	Reo Kanao	金尾玲生		Professional surfer/Entrepreneur	June 24, 1992	27	39 - 42	4
18	Monroe Ron	ロンモンロウ		Model/Singer	July 31, 1995	24	42 - 42	1

*Age when they first joined Terrace House.

=== Guest appearances ===
Name	Japanese	Cast member	Episode(s)
Yusuke Aizawa	鮎澤悠介	Aloha State	7, 9-10, 13-16
Avian Ku	エビアン・クー	Aloha State	15
Kaito Nakata	中田海斗	Opening New Doors	39
Masato Yukawa	湯川正人	Boys x Girls Next Door	39

== Episodes ==
No. in Season	No. in Part	Title	Netflix Japan Release Date	Fuji TV Air Date	Length (mins)
Part 1
1	1	"We're Back in Tokyo"	May 14, 2019	TBA	40
All the members enter the house and some initial relationships begin to form. Shohei seems to hit it off with Kaori and asks her out to drinks.
2	2	"Tempura Incident"	May 21, 2019	TBA	39
Haruka asks Kenji for a guitar lesson and they promise to hang out on the weekend. Some of the members discuss their dreams over drinks at home.
3	3	"Dreamed of Her"	May 28, 2019	TBA	37
Though Ruka and Risako go out for pancakes and a movie, Ruka isn't sure if it counts as a date. But when Ruka gets a fever, Risako takes care of him.
4	4	"I Want to Be a Hero"	June 4, 2019	TBA	42
After Haruka buys a guitar in Harajuku, Ruka gives her a ride back to the house. While playing cards together, Risako and Ruka make a wager.
5	5	"Reiwa!!"	June 18, 2019	TBA	45
The house rings in the Reiwa era. Ruka gives Risako a ride to parkour practice, Haruka enters a drag race, and Kaori and Kenji go out for burgers.
6	6	"The Grass is Greener on the Other Side"	June 25, 2019	TBA	57
Haruka and Ruka go on a date; over a steak dinner, she asks him what he thinks of Risako. It seems that romance is on everyone's mind.
7	7	"Woman to Treat and Woman to Split the Check"	July 2, 2019	TBA	45
The atmosphere gets a little strained as Haruka and Risako find it difficult to talk to one another. They know they're both interested in Kenji.
8	8	"Passive Boys"	July 9, 2019	TBA	48
The ladies of the house go to lunch together, where they agree that the guys' passivity is unsatisfying. That night, Risako tells Ruka and Shohei.
9	9	"Girlfight"	July 23, 2019	TBA	45
Both Risako and Haruka declare that they're interested in Kenji, which leads to a serious late-night argument. Later, Kenji hears about it all.
10	10	"The Boy That Gets Treated"	July 30, 2019	TBA	43
Haruka and Shohei attend a festival to hear Kenji and Terrace House alum Yusuke perform. The members prepare a surprise birthday party for Kenji.
11	11	"Broccoli Pasta, Carbonara-Style"	August 6, 2019	TBA	49
Kaori admits that she's losing confidence in her artistic abilities, but Kenji isn't very supportive. Ruka talks about his dreams, but he lacks focus.
12	12	"Always Chillin'"	August 13, 2019	TBA	46
The night of her birthday party, Kaori and Ruka talk for a long time. Kenji tells Shohei he's got feelings for Risako, and he's planning to tell her.
Part 2
13	1	"All Or Nothing"	August 27, 2019	TBA	48
The weather is stormy, but Kenji and Risako head out for a beach date and Kenji confesses his feelings. NBA star Rui Hachimura stops by the studio.
14	2	"Just A Moment, Please"	September 3, 2019	TBA	43
Kaori meets with a friend to talk about her art and her feelings for Shohei. The night of Kenji's farewell party, Risako makes a surprising decision.
15	3	"A Man's Worth Is Determined By His Job"	September 10, 2019	TBA	38
In an action acting class, Shohei and Haruka do pretty good in their fight scenes, but Ruka fails to shine. Two new members arrive in the house.
16	4	"Orange Flavor First Kiss"	September 17, 2019	TBA	44
Durato and Haruka have drinks on the roof one night and talk about his relationship history. The members use the house pool for the first time.
17	5	"This is Not a Place to Slack"	October 1, 2019	TBA	37
Peppe invites Emika to go to the beach after playing video games with Haruka. Ruka applies for a new job, then asks Emika out on a drive.
18	6	"Bros Before Hoes"	October 8, 2019	TBA	35
Emika and Peppe take their trip to Zushi beach. After a night swim, Shohei tells Ruka about a big decision before heading out the next morning.
19	7	"The Stray Sheep"	October 15, 2019	TBA	38
Emika and Ryo hit it off during their baseball outing, while Peppe and Haruka enjoy an afternoon playing Pokémon Go. Housecleaning is in the air.
20	8	"The Third Flower"	October 22, 2019	TBA	41
Kaori makes a shocking announcement, and an outgoing new house member smashes in and makes waves. The girls gossip about the boys.
21	9	"Too Shy Girl"	November 5, 2019	TBA	43
Change is in the air as the members bond with the new arrival. Energetic Hana is love-struck by Ryo, while Emika reveals she's hanging out with Ruka.
22	10	"Tip Off"	November 12, 2019	TBA	44
Peppe makes progress on his manga; Emika and Haruka discuss their insecurities. Hana gets jealous of Emika after they both cheer on Ryo at his game.
23	11	"Friendship Between Men and Women"	November 19, 2019	TBA	44
Tensions rise in the house when Haruka has her long-awaited date with Ryo. Emika worries about her future prospects both professionally and in love.
24	12	"Pink Rose"	November 26, 2019	TBA	40
After an intense encounter, Emika makes a stand. Peppe and Haruka go on their long-awaited date, but nerves and other priorities get in the way.
Part 3
25	1	"The Girls Can't Do It"	December 9, 2019	TBA	52
Athlete Yusuke Tamuara joins as a studio guest, and Haruka gives Peppe her answer. After Ruka makes a special dinner, he gives a speech in English.
26	2	"Internationalization at Once"	December 16, 2019	TBA	41
Friendships are never forgotten as Peppe takes his next step. The house takes on a more international feel as three new members arrive.
27	3	"I Can't Be Here"	December 24, 2019	TBA	38
Members new and old get to know each other. Hana gets serious when Ryo returns home with an injury, and the housemates throw a Halloween party.
28	4	"Starving for Affection"	December 31, 2019	TBA	47
Kai offers Hana some emotional support as Ryo and Vivi grow closer. Tupas reveals more about himself to his housemates.
29	5	"About Love"	January 14, 2020	TBA	50
Comedian Chiemi Blouson joins the studio. Kai works on his next routine, while Hana seeks advice from friends and the girls go on the offense for love.
30	6	"Not Guilty"	January 21, 2020	TBA	47
Tupas treats Emika to a movie and dinner, and the female members go to Kai's standup show. Awkward encounters ensue between Hana, Vivi and Ryo.
31	7	"Publicity Stunt"	January 28, 2020	TBA	40
Actor Eiichiro Funakoshi joins the studio. Hana reaches out to a sick Kai; Vivi dispenses some harsh advice and Ryo continues to send mixed signals.
32	8	"I Hate You"	February 4, 2020	TBA	40
The members go out for dinner together and Ryo shares some upsetting news. Later, he discusses his feelings honestly, and Vivi makes one last stand.
33	9	"Half Blue"	February 18, 2020	TBA	44
Emika tells Hana about her decision before her romantic date with Tupas. Kai and Hana bond, and attractive new tenant Toshiyuki joins the house.
34	10	"Case of The Bottle Beer Incident"	February 25, 2020	TBA	46
Tupas and Emika leave the house, and new members Yume and Shion arrive. Toshiyuki goes on offense to get closer with each of the female members.
35	11	"The Monster in the Hallway"	March 3, 2020	TBA	45
Vivi tries to make plans for Christmas with Ryo, but when it doesn't work out, Toshiyuki tests his prospects. The house gets into the holiday spirit.
36	12	"Angel"	March 10, 2020	TBA	48
Toshiyuki and Yume go on a passionate date, but Yume is hesitant about the next steps. Kai gets some advice and the members ring in the new year.
Part 4
37	1	"Another Terrace!!"	March 24, 2020	TBA	48
Hana, Kai, and Yume join Toshiyuki on a two-day, one-night trip to Kyoto to test the dating waters, but things don't go quite the way they planned.
38	2	"Case of The Costume Incident"	March 31, 2020	TBA	42
The girls get together to vent after the trip, and Vivi confronts Kai, who then has a rough show. Hana's wrestling clothes get ruined in the wash.
39	3	"Always Remembered"	April 7, 2020	TBA	46
Kai apologizes to Hana before his announcement. New member Reo, a pro surfer, eyes Vivi when he arrives, bringing a change of pace in the house.
40	4	"Never Forgive Luigi"	April 14, 2020	TBA	44
Vivi bonds with Reo and makes plans with Shion; Yume proposes a trip to Sapporo with Toshiyuki. The house gets spirited during the Setsubun holiday.
41	5	"Life-Threatening Date"	May 12, 2020	TBA	42
Toshiyuki's Hokkaido trip with Yume approaches, but her closeness with Reo sparks jealousy. Shion and Reo each spend more time with the female members.
42	6	"Woman Who Makes Everyone Dream"	May 19, 2020	TBA	43
Yume gives her answer to Toshiyuki. Hana's matches get cancelled due to COVID-19. Shion confides in Vivi who makes an announcement at a group dinner.

== Production ==
The 2019–2020 season was originally planned as an extended Terrace House edition with an extended run of episodes that would lead up to the Tokyo 2020 Summer Olympics. In the first episode, the panel spoke about the ambitions of this special season which would culminate around the same time as the global sporting event.

Comedian Yoshimi Tokui, a panel regular, took leave from the show in late 2019 after he was charged with not reporting income of over 100 million yen over a period of three years for his one-person company. He apologized, saying he missed the payments due to his "sloppiness and neglectfulness."

In April 2020, the production of the show was halted due to the COVID-19 pandemic in Japan, a decision that was announced shortly after the postponement of the Summer Olympics on March 30, 2020. The show resumed airing episodes that were filmed prior to the suspension of production in May 2020 with Ryota Yamasato hosting the commentary segments alone, before Reina Triendl joined him to co-host.

But the release of new episodes was again suspended following the suicide of cast member Hana Kimura on May 23, 2020. Following Kimura's death, Fuji Television announced their decision to cancel the season on May 27, 2020, leaving the final two produced episodes of the show (episodes 43 and 44) unaired.

== Death of Hana Kimura ==
On May 23, 2020, cast member Hana Kimura died by suicide while isolating at her own home during the COVID-19 pandemic.

Before her death, Kimura shared a picture of herself and her cat on Instagram with the words, "I love you, have a happy long life. Sorry." She also tweeted hours before her death: "Every day, I receive nearly 100 honest opinions and I cannot deny that I get hurt."

Several notes were discovered in her apartment, with one addressed to her mother. Kimura's death led to a widespread conversation about cyberbullying messages she faced from Terrace House viewers, a situation that escalated after the episode "Case of the Costume Incident," which included a scene where she was involved in a fight with cast member Kai Kobayashi over him accidentally washing her wrestling costume.

Hana Kimura's mother Kyoko Kimura claimed in weekly magazine Shūkan Bunshun that Hana was pressured by the staff to stage the fight with Kobayashi. In July 2020, she filed a complaint with the Broadcasting Ethics & Program Improvement Organization claiming the producers edited the program to misrepresent her daughter as violent. She said the program violated her daughter's personal and human rights and continued shooting even after her daughter hyperventilated following the dispute with Kobayashi.

Kobayashi also claimed in Shūkan Bunshun that he was asked by the staff to touch her breast.

In August 2020, Fuji Television released an internal report which outlined some of the circumstances surrounding Hana's experience on the show and her subsequent suicide. The producers noted in the report that Hana engaged in self-harm after the fight with Kobayashi. They said staff had met with her on a number of occasions where they suggested she stop using social media and seek professional care.

Hana's mother disputed the report's findings, saying she doubted the investigation was impartial, and that the TV network could have foreseen the cyber bullying because of their past experience with the popular show.

On August 10, Netflix removed episodes 20 to 42 from its streaming platform across all international markets. Episode 20 featured a brief introduction of Kimura before she entered the house, while on all subsequent episodes she was one of the housemates.

Kyoko Kimura announced in December 2021 that she will file a lawsuit against Fuji TV and a production company.

== Reception ==
A story arc involving Toshiyuki Niino and Yume Yoshida saw Tom Hanaway of The Japan Times write a piece criticizing the show and its commentary panel for not making "a bigger deal" about consent. In the episode "Angel," Niino is shown smearing lip balm on Yoshida's lips and then suddenly kissing her for the first time, without asking permission. On another date in the episode "Another Terrace!!," Yoshida had to decline Niino's physical advances "over a dozen times."

Hanaway generalized the studio commentators' reactions to these moments by saying they first sympathize with the woman, "before typically ending up at the outdated sentiment: She was asking for it." He noted that while several Western media outlets and online viewers criticized them over a similar situation in the previous season, the panel members had yet to face any backlash in Japan for their remarks - or lack thereof - on consent. He wrote that "The conversation on consent in Japan hasn't progressed as far as it has in some places abroad, but those places are precisely where the show is popular." In a YouTube video he made with Vivi where they discussed how the Terrace House program only shows short clips of their lives at the house and viewers then think they know them as a result, Niino briefly addressed foreign viewers who accused him of sexual assault based only on seeing the clips; "it's the person's decision whether it's a sexual assault or not. If the person says it is, then it is. But who are you to judge?"
