= VertVixen =

American professional wrestler

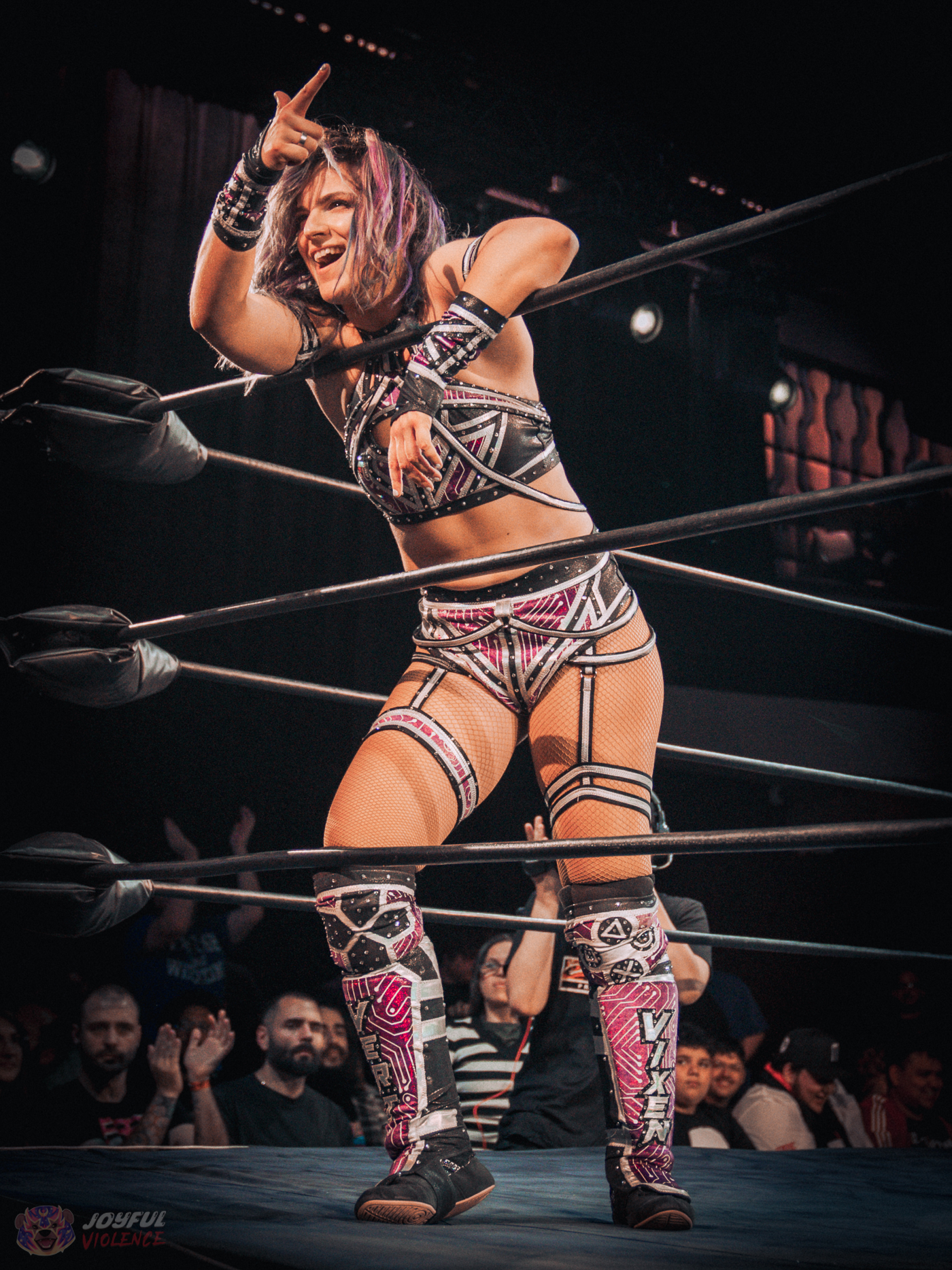
- VertVixen in May 2024

Personal information
- Born: Alicia Bellamy; 7 January 1990 (age 36) Lake Forest, California, U.S.

Professional wrestling career
- Ring name(s): VertVixen; Glitch The Gamer; Vert Vixen
- Billed height: 5 ft 9 in (175 cm)
- Billed from: Lake Forest, California, U.S.
- Trained by: Adam "Lil Evil" Caudillo; Dustin Rhodes
- Debut: 2019

Alicia Bellamy-Caudillo, better known by the ring name VertVixen, is an American professional wrestler currently signed to All Elite Wrestling where she also wrestles on its sister promotion Ring of Honor.

== Career ==
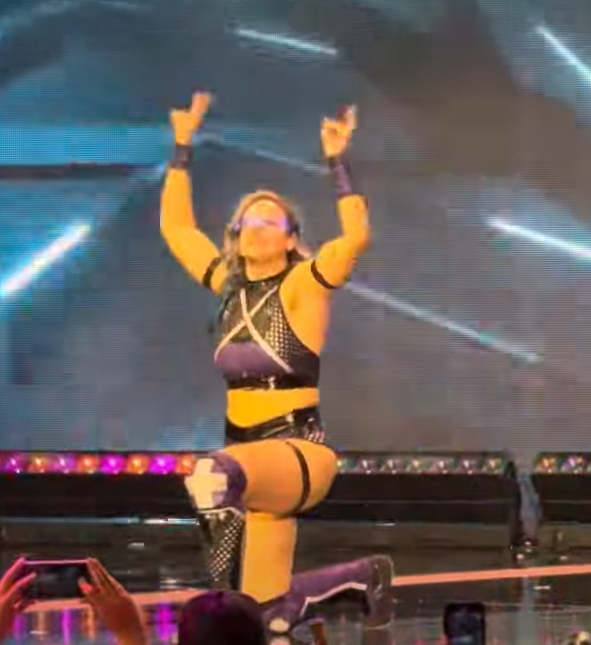
VertVixen at Final Battle 2023

VertVixen made her debut on the independent circuit in 2019. She made her All Elite Wrestling debut on 16 December 2020 in a loss to Red Velvet on AEW Dark. She continued to make AEW Dark and AEW Dark: Elevation appearances throughout 2021 before making her television debut on 12 December 2022 losing to Jade Cargill on AEW Rampage. On 30 September 2023 she made her AEW Collision debut, losing to Julia Hart.

In 2023 she began appearing on Ring of Honor, notably in a loss to Nyla Rose at Final Battle. In August 2026, it was reported that VertVixen had officially signed with AEW and ROH.

== Championships and accomplishments ==
- DEFY Wrestling
  - DEFY Women's Championship (1 time, inaugural)
- New Texas Pro Wrestling
  - New Texas Pro Women's Championship (1 time)
- Rhodes Wrestling Academy
  - RWA Women's Championship (1 time, current)
- Sabotage Wrestling
  - Sabotage Tag Team Championship (1 time) - with Lil Evil
- Spark Joshi Puroresu of America
  - Spark Joshi Pacific Championship (1 time)
- Pro Wrestling Illustrated
  - Ranked No. 39 of the top 250 singles women wrestlers in the PWI 500 in 2023
- Pro Wrestling Illustrated
  - Ranked No. 61 of the top 250 singles women wrestlers in the PWI 500 in 2024
