= Peppe (artist) =

Italian manga artist

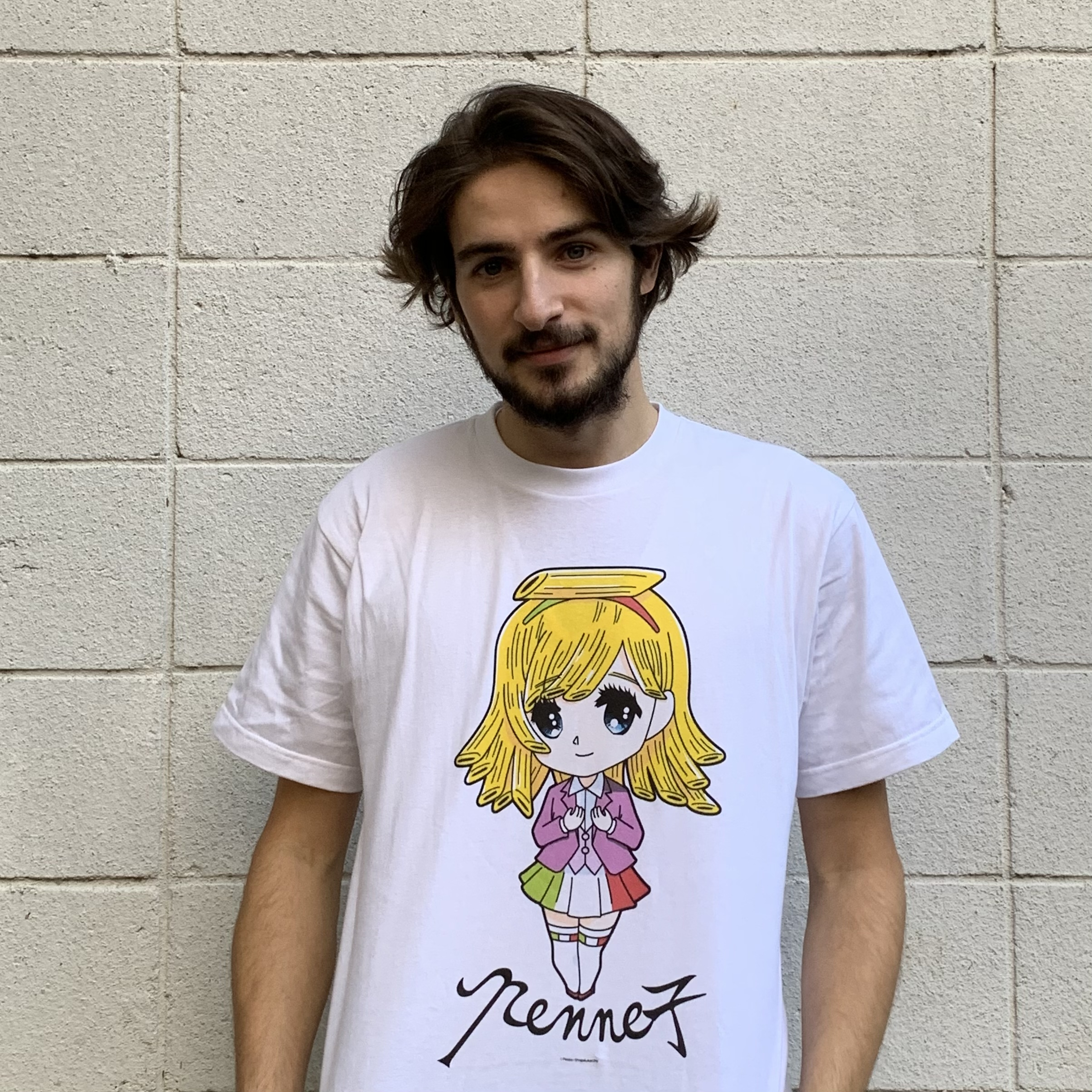
- Peppe in Tokyo
- Born: Giuseppe Durato; December 24, 1992 (age 33); Fossacesia, Italy
- Education: Ca' Foscari University of Venice
- Occupation: Manga artist
- Writing career
- Years active: 2019–present
- Subject: Seinen manga
- Notable work: Mingo
- Website: Official website

Giuseppe Durato (born December 24, 1992), better known by the pen name Peppe (Japanese: ペッペ), is an Italian manga artist living and working in Japan. His first manga series, Mingo, was serialized in Big Comic Spirits from 2019 to 2020. Peppe was a cast member of the reality television series Terrace House: Tokyo 2019–2020, which showed him in the period just prior to the launch of Mingo.

== Early life ==
Born in Fossacesia, Italy to parents who are both chefs, Peppe is the eldest of three siblings; he has one brother and one sister. Although he has been a fan of Japanese video games, particularly Pokémon, and anime such as Ranma ½, City Hunter and Dragon Ball since he was a child, he did not learn about manga until he was 16 years old. Planning to move to Japan, Peppe entered Ca' Foscari University of Venice focusing on Japanese Studies in order to fully understand the culture first. His favorite manga artist is Taiyō Matsumoto. Other artists he was influenced by include Tite Kubo, Takehiko Inoue and Kengo Hanazawa. Peppe is trilingual, able to speak Italian, English and Japanese.

== Career ==
After graduating, Peppe bought a one-way plane ticket and moved to Japan in January 2015 in order to become a manga artist. He initially worked at a restaurant in Ginza and gave private Italian lessons before starting work as a model. He explained that after only one hour in Shibuya he was scouted and started working as a model in order to pay the bills. Peppe was an assistant to manga artist Keiko Nishi. After completing a manga story he felt confident in, he called the editors of Big Comic Spirits and scheduled a meeting to discuss having them publish it. He submitted this work, Model Monogatari (モデル物語), to their June 2017 award contest and won an Effort Award that earned him ¥10,000 (roughly US$100). His manga Hatsukoi (初恋) won an August 2017 Encouragement Award. In March 2018, Model: Mingo ~ Itariajin ga Minna Moteru to Omou na yo (MODEL：ミンゴ～イタリア人がみんなモテルと思うなよ) won an Honorable Mention Award.

In September 2019, Peppe became a cast member of the Fuji TV and Netflix reality TV series Terrace House: Tokyo 2019–2020. He left the show the day after Mingo began publication, citing the forthcoming hectic work schedule of a weekly manga series. The artist included some of his housemates from the show in Mingo, including Ruka Nishinoiri in chapter one, and Hana Kimura following her death in May 2020. Chapter one also features an "Obake Inu" drawn by Kaori Watanabe, credited as foxco.

Peppe's first serial, Mingo: Non pensare che tutti gli italiani siano popolari con le ragazze!, began publication in the 46th issue of Shogakukan's weekly magazine Big Comic Spirits on October 12, 2019. It is a comedy based on the artist's own life and follows an Italian man named Mingo who travels to Tokyo to study Japanese. Mingo was a nickname given to Peppe in high school; since he wanted to be a manga artist, he was called "Manga", and this eventually evolved into "Mingo." To celebrate the release of the first tankōbon volume, an event was held at Aoyama Book Center on December 17, 2019. It included an interview with the artist, a slideshow of childhood photos, and an appearance by Peppe's fellow Terrace House castmate Ryo Tawatari. In April 2020, Mingo collaborated with Italian fashion brand Tod's. The 30th and final chapter was published on August 3, 2020, in issue 36/37, which also included an interview with Peppe. The fourth and final tankōbon volume was released on October 12, 2020.

Peppe portrayed the character Abele in the January 3, 2022, Fuji TV drama Sensuikan Cappellini-gō no Bōken. Based on his experience on the show, he created the two-page Sensuikan Cappellini-gō no Bōken Satsuei Taiken-ki (潜水艦カッペリーニ号の冒険 撮影体験記) for Big Comic Spirits's combined issue 4/5 of 2022.

== Works ==
- Mingo: Non pensare che tutti gli italiani siano popolari con le ragazze! (ミンゴ イタリア人がみんなモテると思うなよ, Mingo: Itariajin ga Minna Moteru to Omounayo; 'Mingo: Don't Think that All Italians Would Be Popular with the Girls!', 2019–2020)
- Endo (エンド; 2023–2025)
