= Terrace House: Opening New Doors =

- The initial cast of Terrace House: Opening New Doors.
- Genre: Reality
- Presented by: You, Reina Triendl, Yoshimi Tokui, Azusa Babazono, Ryota Yamasato, Shono Hayama
- Opening theme: "...Ready for It?" by Taylor Swift (Japan) "Trying" by Eleventyseven (International)
- Ending theme: "Chasing Cars" by Snow Patrol (Japan) ”Frozen” by Jerome Spence (International)
- Country of origin: Japan
- Original language: Japanese
- No. of seasons: 3 (6 parts)
- No. of episodes: 49

Production
- Production location: Japan
- Running time: 30 minutes
- Production company: Fuji Television

Original release
- Network: Fuji TV (Japan); Netflix (international)
- Release: December 19, 2017 – February 12, 2019

Related
- Terrace House: Aloha State; Terrace House: Tokyo 2019–2020

Terrace House: Opening New Doors (Japanese: テラスハウス オープニング ニュー ドアーズ, Hepburn: Terasu Hausu Ōpuningu Nyū Doāzu) is a Japanese reality television series in the Terrace House franchise set in Karuizawa of the Nagano prefecture in Japan. It premiered on Netflix Japan as a Netflix Original on December 19, 2017. It is a Netflix and Fuji Television co-production which is also broadcast on Fuji TV in Japan, first through Fuji on Demand (FOD) on January 16, 2018 and on-air broadcast on January 22, 2018.

== Cast ==
=== Main cast ===
№	Name			Occupation	Birth date	Age*	Appearance	
№	English	Japanese	Nickname	Occupation	Birth date	Age*	Eps	#
01	Ami Komuro	小室安未	Ami	university student / aspiring model	January 19, 1997	21	01 - 17	17
02	Yuudai Arai	新井雄大	Yuudai	aspiring chef	April 8, 1998	19	01 - 09	9
03	Mizuki Haruta	治田みずき	Miju	digital content editor / interpreter / online lingerie store owner	June 30, 1991	26	01 - 09	9
04	Takayuki Nakamura	中村貴之	Taka	professional snowboarder	May 25, 1986	31	01 - 34	34
05	Tsubasa Sato	佐藤つば冴	Tsu-chan / Captain Tsubasa	ice hockey player	September 28, 1993	25	01 - 21	21
06	Shion "Sean" Okamoto	岡本至恩	Shion	model	January 13, 1995	23	01 - 21	21
07	Shohei Uemura	上村翔平	Shohei	musician / vocalist	July 16, 1989	28	10 - 31	22
08	Seina Shimabukuro	島袋聖南	Seina	model	April 4, 1987	30	10 - 34	25
09	Mayu Koseta	小瀬田麻由	Mayu	gravure model	November 12, 1994	23	17 - 26	10
10	Yui Tanaka	田中優衣	Yui	university student	December 24, 1996	21	22 - 49	28
11	Noah Ishikura	石倉ノア	Noah	aspiring pilot	November 19, 1996	21	22 - 34	13
12	Aya Matarai	又来綾	Aya	university student	December 29, 1997	20	26 - 38	13
13	Shunsuke Ikezoe	池添俊亮	Shunsuke	aspiring hair & makeup artist	April 27, 1997	21	32 - 38	7
14	Kaito Nakata	中田海斗	Kaito	pro skateboarder	September 12, 1997	20	35 - 49	15
15	Maya Kisanuki	木佐貫まや	Maya	fashion student, model	August 16, 1998	19	35 - 49	15
16	Sota Kono	河野聡太	Sota	app developer	November 5, 1992	25	35 - 42	8
17	Aio Fukuda	福田愛大	Aio	former soccer player	December 18, 1994	23	38 - 49	12
18	Risako Tanigawa	谷川利沙子	Risako / Richako	print model	May 29, 1990	28	38 - 49	12
19	Masao Wada	和田理生	Masao	musician (Gesu no Kiwami Otome)	February 20, 1987	31	42 - 49	8

*Age when they first joined Terrace House.

=== Guest appearances ===
Name	Japanese	Cast member	Episode(s)
Hana Imai	今井華	Boys × Girls Next Door	Episode 14
Guy Sato	佐藤魁	Aloha State	Episode 39

== Episodes ==
Season	Episodes		Originally released	
Season	Episodes		First released	Last released
1	16	8	December 19, 2017	February 13, 2018
1	16	8	February 27, 2018	April 24, 2018
2	16	8	May 8, 2018	July 3, 2018
2	16	8	July 17, 2018	September 11, 2018
3	17	8	September 25, 2018	November 20, 2018
3	17	9	December 4, 2018	February 12, 2019

=== Season 1 (2017-18) ===
No. overall	No. in season	Title	Netflix Japan Release Date	Fuji TV Air Date	Length (mins)
Part 1
1	1	"Opening New Doors"	December 19, 2017	January 22, 2018	42
Six strangers gather in a house in Karuizawa. Aged 19 to 31, they've got one thing in common: they'll be living together in a beautiful house.
2	2	"A New Experience For Her"	December 26, 2017	January 29, 2018	34
As everyone settles in, Yuudai shows off his cooking skills. When four of the members go out to lunch, he seems to hit it off with one girl in particular.
3	3	"Captain Tsubasa"	January 2, 2018	February 5, 2018	32
In the midst of discussing their dreams for the future, Shion gives Ami some advice. Then the group visits the restaurant of Tsubasa's father.
4	4	"The Reason She Cried"	January 9, 2018	February 12, 2018	36
Yuudai wants to be independent, but he's struggling. Later, Ami starts crying when Yuudai asks her bluntly what she wants to do with her life.
5	5	"Cocky Kid"	January 23, 2018	February 19, 2018	40
Mizuki grows increasingly skeptical of Yuudai, who keeps buying things using his father's credit card. Tsubasa and Shion head to Kusatsu Onsen.
6	6	"First Snowfall"	January 30, 2018	February 26, 2018	42
Yuudai vows to make changes and finds a restaurant to work at, while Ami makes some career decisions. The two of them go on a date in Karuizawa.
7	7	"I Erased Him From My World"	February 6, 2018	March 12, 2018	42
Ami and Yuudai both dissect their date with the other members. Yuudai is taken aback by Ami's attitude towards him the next day.
8	8	"A Man with Different Values"	February 13, 2018	April 9, 2018	38
Mizuki spends the night in Tokyo with her old boyfriend. Shut out by Ami, Yuudai reconnects with an old girlfriend too, while Takayuki tries to help.
Part 2
9	1	"She's the MVP"	February 27, 2018	April 16, 2018	44
Tsubasa and Shion visit a temple for good luck before her team's big game. Meanwhile, Mizuki makes a decision, and Yuudai cooks for a house party.
10	2	"The Christmas Assassin"	March 6, 2018	April 23, 2018	37
Takayuki takes Ami to a breathtaking cafe, while Tsubasa's confidence takes a hit after hearing about Shion's ex. On Christmas, new members arrive.
11	3	"Best Actor in a Supporting Role"	March 13, 2018	April 30, 2018	37
Seina and Takayuki take a stroll in Kyu-Karuizawa. When Ami hears about it, she invites Takayuki snowboarding. Then Shion and Tsubasa go ice-skating.
12	4	"If Only You Were Five Years Younger"	March 20, 2018	May 7, 2018	40
When Ami and Takayuki go snowboarding, she tells him something very intriguing. Shion answers a question about Tsubasa, and then it's New Year's.
13	5	"She Asks Too Much For Love"	April 3, 2018	May 14, 2018	40
Some of the members go snowboarding, but Ami and Takayuki only have eyes for each other. Tsubasa goes to Tokyo to buy Shion a birthday present.
14	6	"The Birthday That Decided Their Fate"	April 10, 2018	May 21, 2018	36
The members throw a birthday party for Ami and Shion, and Takayuki surprises everyone by shaving his mustache. Tsubasa gives Shion his gift privately.
15	7	"The Mustache Tells the Story of Love"	April 17, 2018	May 28, 2018	39
Shohei and Ami go out together, but there isn't really a spark. In the face of Ami's cold attitude, Takayuki starts to regrow his mustache.
16	8	"Life is Just a Little Too Late"	April 24, 2018	June 4, 2018	38
Takayuki tells Seina and Shohei that he no longer has feelings for Ami, but Shohei's feelings for her have grown. Ami, meanwhile, makes a choice.

=== Season 2 (2018) ===
No. overall	No. in season	Title	Netflix Japan Release Date	Fuji TV Air Date	Length (mins)
Part 3
17	1	"Sinful Cleavage"	May 8, 2018	June 11, 2018	38
Just before Ami's schedule departure, Shohei meets her at the station for a surprise trip to the slopes -- and he's got a plan. A new member arrives.
18	2	"Flower Bouquet for My Valentine"	May 15, 2018	June 25, 2018	38
It's Valentine's Day, and Tsubasa is about to head to Nagoya for the national championship. Shion has something to tell her before she goes.
19	3	"The Second Attempt"	May 22, 2018	July 9, 2018	37
With the tournament over, Tsubasa has time to think about her next steps -- including her reply to Shion. Shohei heads into the recording studio.
20	4	"A Fairy on a Split Road"	May 29, 2018	July 16, 2018	35
Tsubasa gives Shion her answer. On a snowy day, Mayu and Takayuki talk about love, while Shohei and Seina continue spending time together.
21	5	"Tune-Up"	June 12, 2018	July 23, 2018	43
Seina returns from a trip to Korea looking somewhat different. Takayuki and Mayu go out to eat, and Tsubasa makes another decision.
22	6	"Virgin"	June 19, 2018	July 30, 2018	38
Two new members arrive: aspiring pilot Noah and Karuizawa native, Yui. Almost immediately, Noah and Mayu head out on a date.
23	7	"Meccha Me Too"	June 26, 2018	TBA	40
Takayuki takes Noah to the yakitori place. Mayu really likes Noah, and she gets nervous when he and Yui plan to spend time together.
24	8	"Kiss Out Of Nowhere"	July 3, 2018	TBA	36
Shohei takes Seina out on a birthday dinner. Awkwardness reigns when Mayu's time with Noah goes nowhere. Noah and Yui go on their planned outing.
Part 4
25	1	"The Fallen Angel"	July 17, 2018	TBA	41
Yui keeps trying to patch things up with Mayu. Shohei prepares for an album release show in Shibuya, then ask Yui for some local tips.
26	2	"Better Than You"	July 24, 2018	TBA	37
Mayu and Noah go on a hike, and when they get back, Mayu has an honest talk with Yui and makes a decision. A new member joins Terrace House.
27	3	"On the Night of Camp..."	July 31, 2018	TBA	40
New member Aya settles into the house, and the members make plans to go camping together. Seina responds surprisingly to Shohei's bold moves.
28	4	"Declaration of War"	August 7, 2018	TBA	36
Aya and Takayuki head out on a date together. Meanwhile, after a surprising conversation with Shohei, Noah hangs out with Yui once again.
29	5	"Confessing Love at the Chapel"	August 21, 2018	TBA	42
Yui talks to Shohei about Noah, and then tells Noah off the next day. Shohei makes plans to ask Seina to date him, and Aya asks Shohei for a favor.
30	6	"A Farce"	August 28, 2018	TBA	34
After hearing from Shohei, Noah asks Seina out on a date. During Takayuki's birthday party, Aya talks with him one on one.
31	7	"Rambling Rose"	September 4, 2018	TBA	43
Aya and Yui grow suspicious about Seina and Noah, and Yui tries to interrogate Seina about it. Shohei prepares an event for the other members.
32	8	"The Last Love"	September 11, 2018	October 23, 2018	34
Takayuki gives Aya a gift before he takes her skateboarding. Noah and Seina go on an extremely consequential date, and then a new member arrives.

=== Season 3 (2018-19) ===
No. overall	No. in season	Title	Netflix Japan Release Date	Fuji TV Air Date	Length (mins)
Part 5
33	1	"It's Someone Else"	September 25, 2018	TBA	32
Shun enters the bath with Noah. Who is worried? Takayuki is asked about his feelings for Aya. He confesses he does like someone. Who will it be?
34	2	"Bye Bye, Miss Terrace House"	October 2, 2018	TBA	31
On the morning of Seina and Noah's departure, Takayuki shares a decision with the other member, then travels to Tokyo. Some familiar faces return.
35	3	"Young Faces"	October 9, 2018	TBA	41
Three new members join the House: skateboarder Kaito, student Maya and company employee Sota. The next day, Yui and Kaito go grocery shopping.
36	4	"Take Shelter from the Rain"	October 16, 2018	TBA	41
Maya and Kaito go out to a soba shop to try the Karuizawa specialty. Yui and Kaito make plans to go to a skate park so she can learn to skateboard.
37	5	"First and Last Date"	October 30, 2018	TBA	36
Aya has a heart-to-heart about her future with Yui. After Sota and Shunsuke spend a day hanging out together, Shunsuke comes to a decision.
38	6	"The Goal-Getter and the Goalless"	November 6, 2018	TBA	36
Two new members arrive including a professional football player who is deemed a pretty good talker.
39	7	"Like a Spell of Autumn Rain"	November 13, 2018	TBA	36
Risako sets a date to go out with Sota and Aio. Aio goes to the gym. Aio finds Risako very appealing.
40	8	"A Man Who Can't be Described in Japanese"	November 20, 2018	TBA	39
Kaito and Yui head to Matsumoto to see Shohei in concert. Aio asks Risako out on another date, as does Sota, while Kaito and Maya go to an art exhibit.
Part 6
41	1	"Embarrassing Rejections"	December 4, 2018	TBA	39
Risako is invited to a "Picking Glasses" date. Sota invites Maya to a beer factory. But what are his real intentions?
42	2	"To Have Become Critical"	December 11, 2018	TBA	42
Sota tells everyone about his intention to graduate and leaves Karuizawa. The new member who comes to replace him is somewhat unexpected.
43	3	"Booger Boy and Snoring Boy"	December 18, 2018	TBA	44
Maya distances herself from the other female members. Yui and Risako discuss it. Risako becomes more and more attracted to Wada and is invited out on a date.
44	4	"Only the Apple Was Watching"	December 25, 2018	TBA	43
Wada is infatuated with Risako and tries to impress her with lunch. Kaito goes ice skating with Maya. That evening, snuggled under a blanket...
45	5	"Tattling"	January 8, 2019	TBA	43
One evening, Aio takes Yui to a bar and says he likes her... Risako continues to be absent from the House due to work. Maya and Yui become increasingly uncertain of Risako.
46	6	"No Longer a Virgin"	January 15, 2019	TBA	TBA
During a discussion about what Risako and Aio were doing, Yui and Maya make an accusation against Risako. But Wada comforts Risako's heartbroken feelings. One evening, Aio announces a shocking fact.
47	7	"Still a Virgin"	January 22, 2019	TBA	TBA
Risako confronts Yui about Aio's shocking confession. How does Yui reply the whole truth? Moreover Wada invites Risako to a live (event) and then...
48	8	"Walking Ritz-Carlton"	February 5, 2019	TBA	TBA
Wada shares his feelings with Risako. Risako has concerns and talks to one of Wada's band members, Kawatani... Kaito and Maya go on a date in Shonan. Their relationship continues to be somewhat vague and ambiguous...
49	9	"Departure Whistle"	February 12, 2019	TBA	TBA
Wada performs live for a Christmas event whilst Risako goes to Fukuoka. Where will the two meet afterwards...? Final episode. Cameo appearances of Shohei & Takayuki (3min39sec), Seina & Noah (5min7sec), Sota & Shun (6min40sec), and Tomio & Tsubasa & Shion (9min0sec).
