= Spark Joshi Pacific Championship =

Professional wrestling women's championship

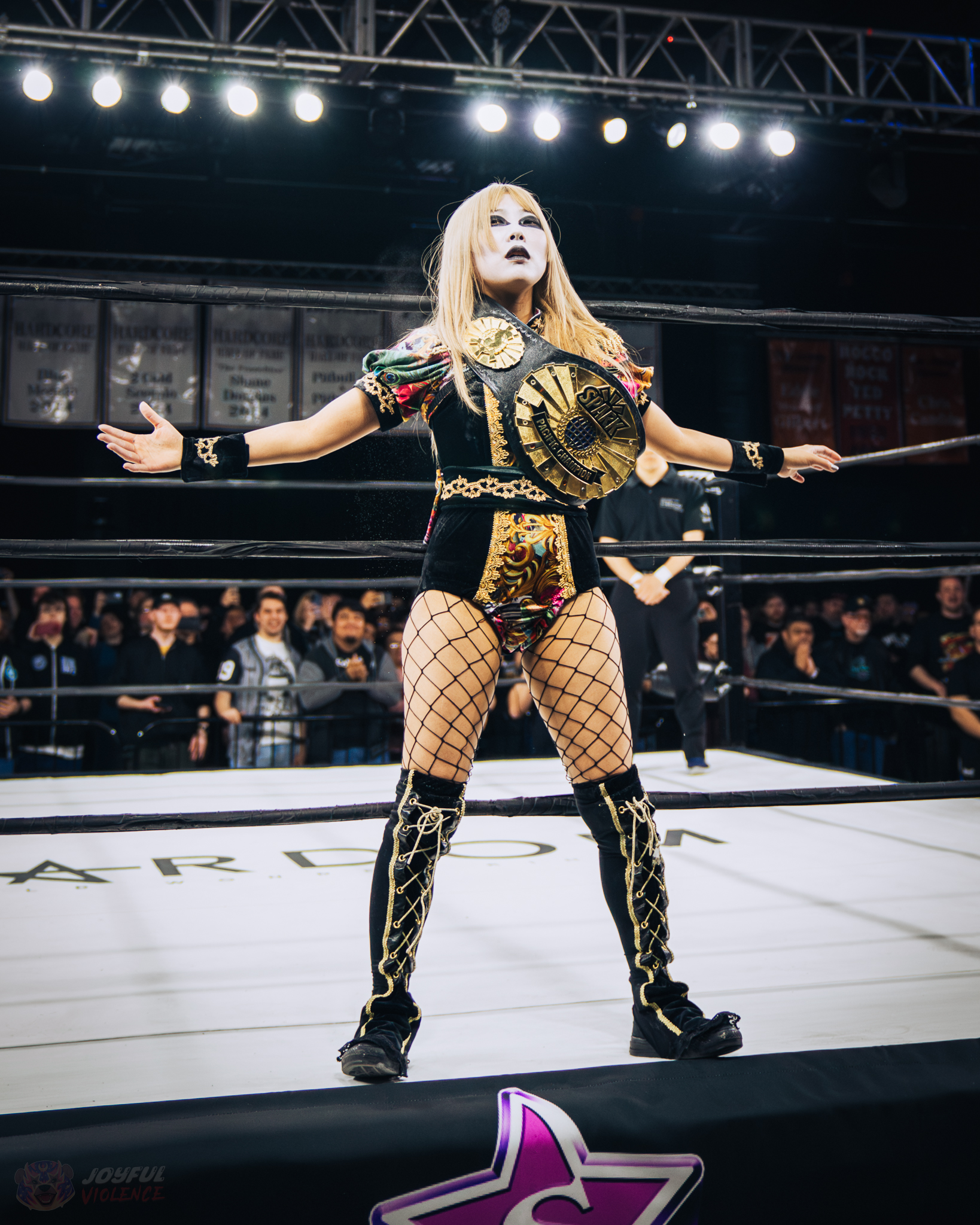
- Ram Kaicho with the current title design

Details
- Promotion: Spark Joshi Puroresu of America
- Date established: June 16, 2023
- Current champion: Kaia McKenna
- Date won: July 12, 2026
Statistics
- First champion: Ram Kaicho
- Most reigns: All titleholders (1 reign)
- Longest reign: Ram Kaicho (671 days)
- Shortest reign: VertVixen (73 days)
- Oldest champion: Kaia McKenna (36 years, 4 months and 21 days)
- Youngest champion: Airica Demia (20 years, 6 months and 17 days)

The Spark Joshi Pacific Championship is a women's professional wrestling championship owned by the Spark Joshi Puroresu of America promotion. The title, which in Spark Joshi's championship hierarchy is situated as the secondary title behind the Spark Joshi World Championship, was introduced on June 16, 2023, when Ram Kaicho became the inaugural champion by defeating Saki in a decision match.

== History ==
On June 16, 2023, during Spark Joshi's second event Ignite West, Ram Kaicho defeated Saki to become the inaugural champion. The first defense of the title was Kaicho's successful defense against Alex Garcia on October 11, during Spark Joshi's third event Rising Heat Wave.

== Reigns ==
As of September 28, 2026, there have been a total of four reigns shared between four different champions. The current titleholder is Kaia McKenna who defeated Airica Demia on July 12, 2026, at SPARK X PWM Nothing Else Matters.

Key
No.	Overall reign number
Reign	Reign number for the specific champion
Days	Number of days held
+	Current reign is changing daily

No.	Champion	Championship change			Reign statistics		Notes	Ref.
No.	Champion	Date	Event	Location	Reign	Days	Notes	Ref.
1	Ram Kaicho	June 16, 2023	Ignite West	West Covina, CA	1	671	Defeated Saki in a decision match to become the inaugural champion.	
2	VertVixen	April 17, 2025	Spark Joshi Lady Luck	Las Vegas, NV	1	73		
3	Airica Demia	June 29, 2025	Spark Ignite Texas	Baytown, TX	1	378	This was a three-way match also involving Miyu Yamashita.	
4	Kaia McKenna	July 12, 2026	SPARK X PWM Nothing Else Matters	Ridgefield Park, NJ	1	78+		
