= Anya Rune =

American professional wrestler (born 2004)

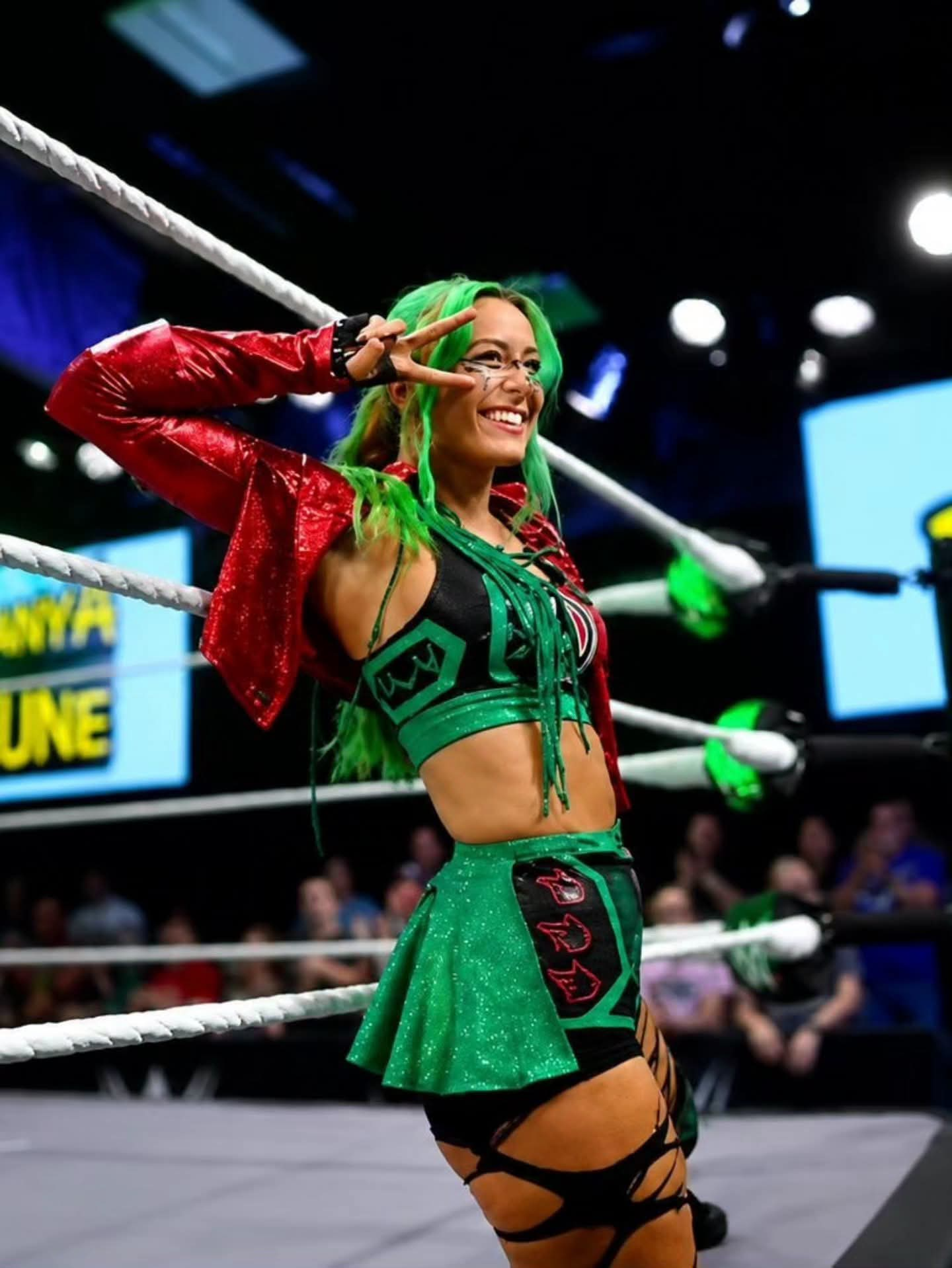
- Anya Rune in 2026

Personal information
- Born: Airica Zayas; December 12, 2004 (age 21) Gastonia, North Carolina, U.S.

Professional wrestling career
- Ring name(s): Airica-Demia; Airica; Anya Rune
- Billed height: 5 ft 7 in (170 cm)
- Billed from: Straight out of a Manga Panel
- Trained by: Ethan Case
- Debut: January 21, 2023

Airica Zayas (born December 12, 2004) is an American professional wrestler known for her time in WWE as a WWE ID prospect under the ring name Anya Rune.

== Early life ==
Zayas was born in Gastonia, North Carolina on December 12, 2004. She began training at the age of 14. In 2020, she started training at the then Palmetto Wrestling Academy (now rebranded to the "STAR LAB") in Lake Murray of Richland, South Carolina under head trainer Ethan Case. She was the first female to graduate from the school.

Zayas is a second generation wrestler.

== Professional wrestling career ==
Zayas made her in ring debut on January 21, 2023 for Pro Wrestling TURBO at TURBO Live At Brewery 85 - Hot Pursuit. She has also made appearances for promotions like Beyond Wrestling, Ring of Honor and Game Changer Wrestling.

On March 29, 2026, it was announced that Zayas had been signed to a WWE ID contract. She made her official debut for the Evolve brand on the April 8 episode of Evolve, where she was introduced under the ring name Anya Rune. On the same night she faced Sloane Jacobs, Gianna Capri and Veronica Haven in a fatal four-way qualifier match for the WWE Evolve Women's Championship which was won by Jacobs. On September 4, it was announced that Rune was released from WWE. On October 19, Zayas announced that she would be stepping away from professional wrestling due to her mental and physical health.

== Championships and accomplishments ==
- Viral Pro Wrestling
  - VPW Women's Championship (1 time)
- Maine Event Wrestling
  - MEW Women's Championship (1 time)
- Hooligan Championship Wrestling
  - HCW Women's World Championship (1 time)
- Spark Joshi Puroresu of America
  - Spark Joshi Pacific Championship (1 time)
- Love-Alive Charity
  - LAC Women's Championship (1 time, inaugural)
- Intergender Bonanza
  - IGB Super Championship (1 time)
