= Spark Joshi Puroresu of America =

American independent professional wrestling promotion

Spark Joshi Puroresu of America Entertainment LLC
- Acronym: SPARK Joshi
- Founded: April 24, 2023; 3 years ago
- Style: Women's professional wrestling (Joshi Puroresu)
- Headquarters: Santa Fe, New Mexico, United States
- Founder(s): C.B. Liffer (Note: Also known as "Chibi C.B."); Francis Jay
- Website: sparkjoshi.com

Spark Joshi Puroresu of America Entertainment LLC, operating as Spark Joshi Puroresu (styled SPARK Joshi), is an American independent women's professional wrestling promotion, founded on April 24, 2023, by filmmaker and Hollywood event director, C.B. Liffer, and producer, Francis Jay.

== History ==
On April 24, 2023, SPARK Joshi released an official press upon their first event "Ignite East" on June 11 in Newark, New Jersey, describing themselves as the "first organization based in the United States (based in Santa Fe, New Mexico) dedicated to importing the culture and creative approach of Japanese women's pro wrestling or joshi puroresu".

On June 11, SPARK Joshi held their first event Ignite East, where Miyu Yamashita became the inaugural Spark Joshi World Champion after defeating Rachael Ellering. On June 16, at Ignite West, Ram Kaicho defeated Saki to become the first Spark Joshi Pacific Champion. On October 14, at Rising Heat East, Saki became the first Spark Joshi Atlantic Champion after defeating Maya Yukihi.

In January 2024, SPARK Joshi established their own dojo in Orlando, Florida, assigning Sumie Sakai as the head trainer.

== Championships ==
Championship	Current champion(s)	Reign	Date won	Days held	Location	Notes
Spark Joshi World Championship	Hazuki	1	April 17, 2025	583+	Las Vegas, Nevada	Defeated Lena Kross at Spark Joshi Lady Luck to win the vacant title.
Spark Joshi Pacific Championship	Kaia McKenna	1	July 12, 2026	132+	Ridgefield, New Jersey	Defeated Airica Demia at SPARK X PWM Nothing Else Matters.
Spark Joshi Atlantic Championship	Saki	1	October 14, 2023	1,134+	Orlando, Florida	Defeated Maya Yukihi at Rising Heat East to become the inaugural champion.
