= Jungle Kyona =

Japanese professional wrestler

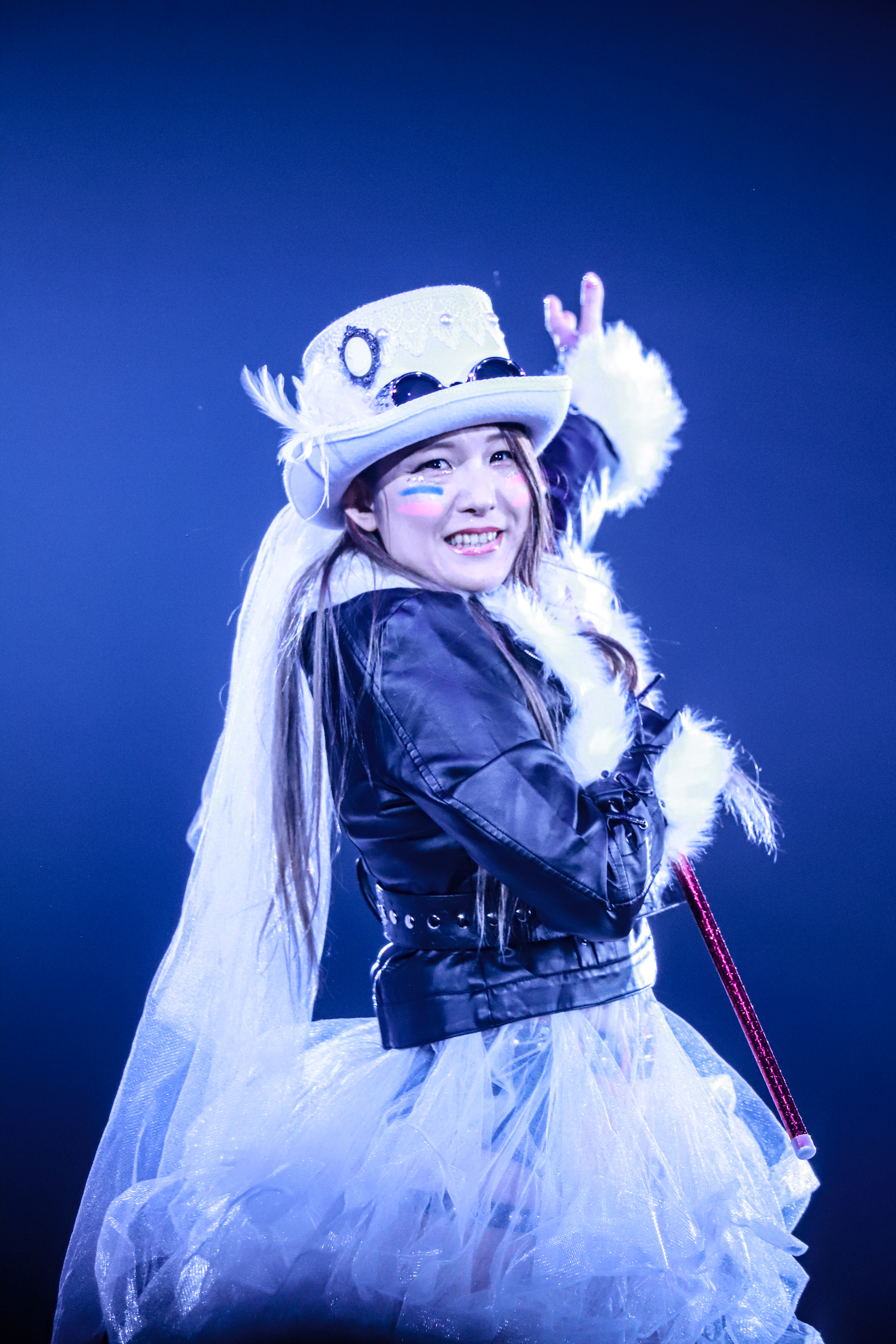
- Kyona in January 2023

Personal information
- Born: Kyona Yano; April 1, 1991 (age 35) Nagoya, Aichi, Japan

Professional wrestling career
- Ring name(s): Black Jungle Fairy; Jungle Kyona
- Billed height: 1.56 m (5 ft 1 in)
- Billed weight: 62 kg (137 lb)
- Trained by: Fuka
- Debut: November 15, 2015

Kyona Yano (矢野 享菜, Yano Kyōna; born April 4, 1991) better known by her ring name Jungle Kyona (ジャングル叫女, Janguru Kyōna), is a Japanese professional wrestler. She is best known for her time in the joshi puroresu promotion World Wonder Ring Stardom, where she was a former three-time Artist of Stardom Champion and Goddesses of Stardom Champion.

== Early life ==
Before becoming a professional wrestler, Yano worked in the Republic of Senegal on the Western Coast of Africa for two years.

== Professional wrestling career ==
=== World Wonder Ring Stardom (2015–2021) ===
==== Early career (2015–2017) ====
On November 15, 2015, Yano made her professional wrestling debut at World Wonder Ring Stardom under the ring name Jungle Kyona, where she defeated Momo Watanabe in her first match. In only a month after her debut, Kyona won the Rookie of Stardom Tournament. On December 23, at Stardom Year-End Climax, Kyona received her first title match where she teamed with Hiromi Mimura and Watanabe as they challenged the Hyper Destroyers (Evie, Hiroyo Matsumoto and Kellie Skater) for the Artist of Stardom Championship, but were unsuccessful.

Entering 2016, Kyona and Momo Watanabe teamed together under the name JKGReeeeN. On January 10, JKGReeeeN challenged Thunder Rock (Io Shirai and Mayu Iwatani) for the Goddesses of Stardom Championship, but were unsuccessful. JKGReeeeN continued to wrestle through 2016 and participated in the 2016 Goddesses of Stardom Tag League, in which they did not reach the finals. Shortly after the tournament, Watanabe turned on Kyona and joined Queen's Quest.

In 2017, Kyona began to pursue several championships. On January 29, Kyona unsuccessfully challenged Kay Lee Ray for the ICW Women's Championship. On February 23, Kyona challenged Kairi Hojo for the Wonder of Stardom Championship, but was unsuccessful. On March 3, Kyona won her first title in her hometown in Nagoya, where she teamed with Matsumoto to defeat Hojo and Yoko Bito to win the Goddesses of Stardom Championship.

==== Team Jungle and J.A.N. (2017–2019) ====
Shortly after winning the Goddesses of Stardom Championship, Kyona and Hiroyo Matsumoto formed a group named "Team Jungle", alongside Kaori Yoneyama and Natsuko Tora. On June 17, Kyona, along with Matsumoto and Yoneyama, defeated Queen's Quest (AZM, HZK and Shirai) to win the Artist of Stardom Championship. The trio held the title until August 13, where they lost the title to HZK, Shirai and Viper. On June 21, Kyona and Matsumoto lost the Goddesses of Stardom Championship to Oedo Tai (Hana Kimura and Kagetsu). Kyona teamed with Bito to participate in the Tag League and managed to win their way to the finals, where they lost to the team of Bea Priestley and Kelly Klein on November 5.

In 2018, Team Jungle started to lose their members, as Matsumoto left Stardom by March and Yoneyama had other commitments in multiple wrestling promotions outside of Stardom, Leaving Kyona and Tora the only members of the group. After not being picked by any unit in the annual draft, Kyona, along with Leo Onozaki, Ruaka, Tora and Yoneyama formed a unit named "J.A.N.", an acronym for Jungle Assault Nation. On May 27, Kyona, along with Tora and Yoneyama, defeated Oedo Tai (Hazuki, Kagetsu and Kimura) to win the vacated Artist of Stardom Championship. On June 17, Kyona main evented Korakuen Hall where she challenged her former tag team partner Watanabe for the Wonder of Stardom Championship, but was unsuccessful. On August 12, Kyona fought to a draw against the debuting Utami Hayashishita, which marked the beginning of a rivalry between the two. On September 30, while J.A.N. lost the Artist of Stardom Championship to Stars (Iwatani, Saki Kashima and Tam Nakano) on the afternoon show, Kyona and Tora defeated Iwatani and Kashima to win the Goddesses of Stardom Championship. At Mask Fiesta 2018 on October 28, 2018, Kyona, under the ring name Black Jungle Fairy, teamed up with Bear Dog and Night Bear in a loss to Dame de Panko, La Gatita and Mayuchica. On November 23, Kyona and Tora lost the Goddesses of Stardom Championship to Watanabe and Utami Hayashishita.

On January 14, 2019, Kyona received her first World of Stardom Championship match, when she challenged Kagetsu, but was unsuccessful. On April 14, at the second annual draft, all faction leaders battled in a five-way where the loser of the match must disband their own unit. Kyona lost to Iwatani, Kagetsu, Kimura and Watanabe, and therefore, J.A.N. was disbanded.

==== Tokyo Cyber Squad and hiatus (2019–2021) ====
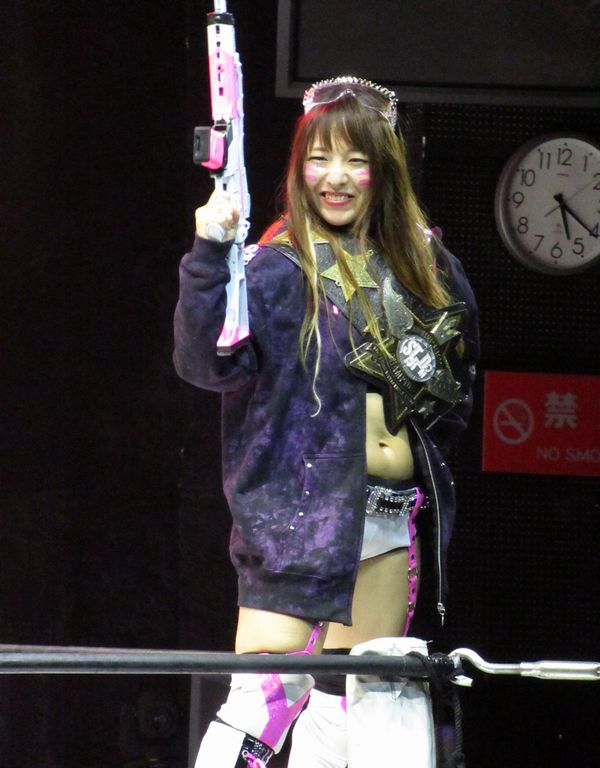
Kyona in 2019

At the 2019 Stardom Draft on April 14, 2019, Kyona was drafted to the International Army stable, later known as Tokyo Cyber Squad. On June 16, Kyona, along with Kimura and fellow Tokyo Cyber Squad member Konami, defeated Iwatani, Kashima and Nakano to win the Artist of Stardom Championship. On June 23, the trio lost the title back to Stars. On July 15, Konami and Kyona won the Goddesses of Stardom Championship, where they defeated Hayashishita and Watanabe.

On January 19, 2020, Konami and Kyona lost the Goddesses of Stardom Championship to Jamie Hayter and Priestley, ending their reign at 188 days with 3 successful title defenses. After Hayter and Priestley vacated the championship as they couldn't defend it due to the COVID-19 pandemic, Konami and Kyona challenged Hayashishita and Saya Kamitani on July 26 for the vacant title, but were unsuccessful. At Stardom Yokohama Cinderella 2020 on October 3, Konami and Kyona lost to Kashima and Tora when the losing team must disband, therefore, Tokyo Cyber Squad was disbanded, as Konami turned on Kyona during the match and joined Oedo Tai. The rest of the Tokyo Cyber Squad were drafted to Stars.

On October 7, Stardom announced that Kyona will be out of in-ring competition for extended period of time, due to multiple injuries. On September 30, 2021, Kyona left Stardom.

=== Independent circuit (2022–present) ===
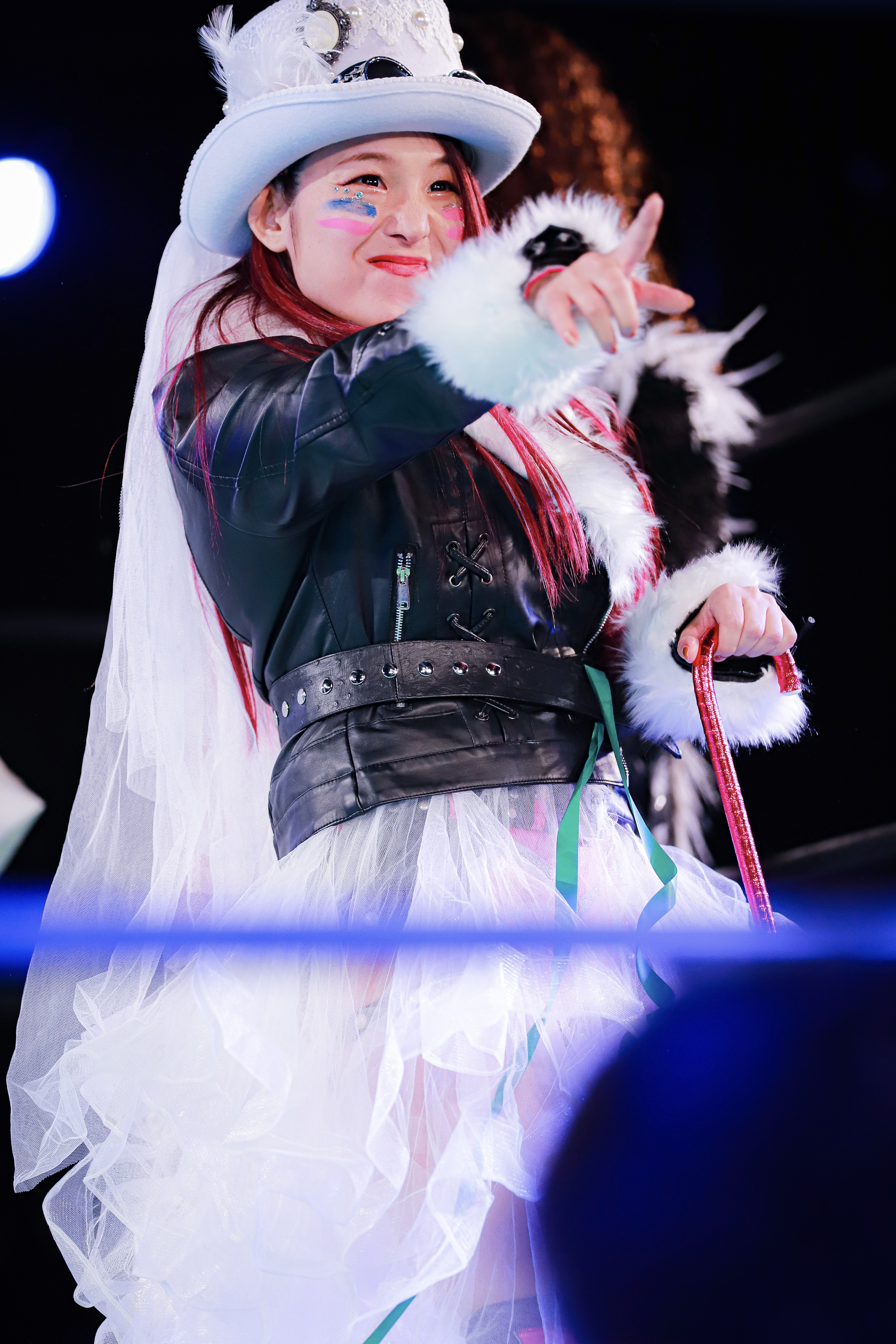
Yano in April 2023

After almost two years of in-ring absence due to injury, Kyona made her return at Hana Kimura Memorial Show 2 on May 23, 2022, where she defeated Kyoko Kimura in an exhibition match. She started an excursion in the United States independent scene and competed in All Elite Wrestling's AEW Dark #167 show from October 25, 2022, where she fell short to Riho. Kyona returned to Japan at the beginning of 2023, and competed in The Great Muta Final "Bye-Bye" on January 22, where she teamed up with Saori Anou and defeated Nomads (Sumire Natsu and Maya Yukihi). In February 2023, Kyona announced she would be taking a hiatus from wrestling due to a knee injury. On the April 5th 2025 Marigold show, she appeared to confront Nanae Takahashi letting her know that she will be facing her on April 26 in a 5 minutes match, making this her official comeback.

== Championships and accomplishments ==
- Pro Wrestling Illustrated
  - Ranked No. 64 of the top 100 female wrestlers in the PWI Female 100 in 2019
  - Ranked No. 31 of the top 50 tag teams in the PWI Tag Team 50 in 2020 with Konami
- World Wonder Ring Stardom
  - Artist of Stardom Championship (3 times) – with Hiroyo Matsumoto and Kaori Yoneyama (1), Natsuko Tora and Kaori Yoneyama (1), and Hana Kimura and Konami (1)
  - Goddesses of Stardom Championship (3 times) – with Hiroyo Matsumoto (1), Natsuko Tora (1) and Konami (1)
  - Stardom Rookie of the Year (2015)
  - 5★Star GP Award (2 times)
    - 5★Star GP Best Match Award (2018) vs. Kagetsu on September 8
    - 5★Star GP Best Match Award (2019) vs. Kagetsu on September 8
  - Stardom Year-End Award (1 time)
    - Best Tag Team Award (2019) with Konami
