= Ram Kaicho =

Japanese professional wrestler

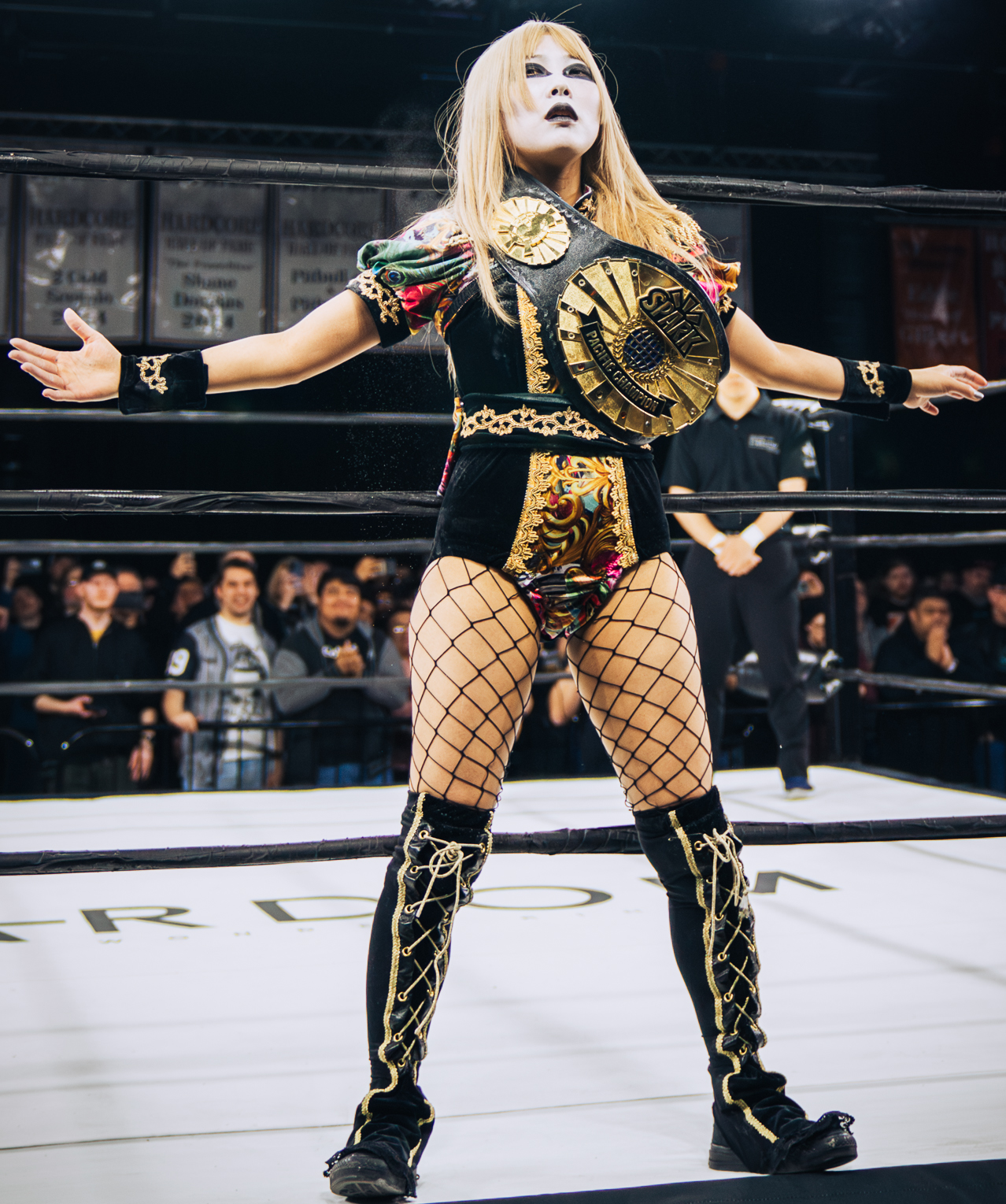
- Kaicho in April 2024

Personal information
- Born: April 14 Japan

Professional wrestling career
- Ring names: Atomic Banshee; Chairman Ramu; President Ramu; Ram Kaicho; Ram Kaichow
- Debut: 2005

Ram Kaicho (ラム会長, Ramu Kaichō; lit. "President Ram", often transcribed as Ram Kaichow) is a Japanese professional wrestler currently working as a freelancer and is best known for her tenure with the Japanese promotions Ice Ribbon and Wrestling of Darkness 666.

== Professional wrestling career ==
=== Independent circuit (2006–2009) ===
Ram debuted as a professional wrestler while being an elementary school pupil on February 18, 2006, at 666 1st Fan Appreciation Day: Welcome To 666, an event promoted by Wrestling of Darkness 666 where she teamed up with Kenji Sawaragi and Kyoko Kimura to defeat Minepyon, Naoshi Sano and Shinobu.

Since her debut, Ram was one of the youngest female wrestlers of Japan and her gimmick has been portraited as a demonic possessed kid who was fighting significantly older opponents. Debuting as a comedy wrestler and going under the nickname of "President Ram", Ram was often billed as the daughter of The Undertaker, using to perform the latter's infamous chokeslam against larger opponents. She was even able to win the Ironman Heavymetalweight Championship around the age of 12, making her one of the youngest recognized champions in Japanese professional wrestling.

Beside 666 Wrestling, Ram made sporadic appearances for other promotions in the Japanese independent scene. At The Eight Ice Ribbon, an event promoted by Ice Ribbon on November 6, 2006, she teamed up with Onryo to defeat Makoto and Masa Takanashi. Before taking a nearly ten-year hiatus from professional wrestling, Ram had her last match at New Ice Ribbon #111 on August 23, 2009, where she teamed up with Yuko Miyamoto to defeat Riho and Yuki Sato.

=== Wrestling of Darkness 666 (2019–present) ===
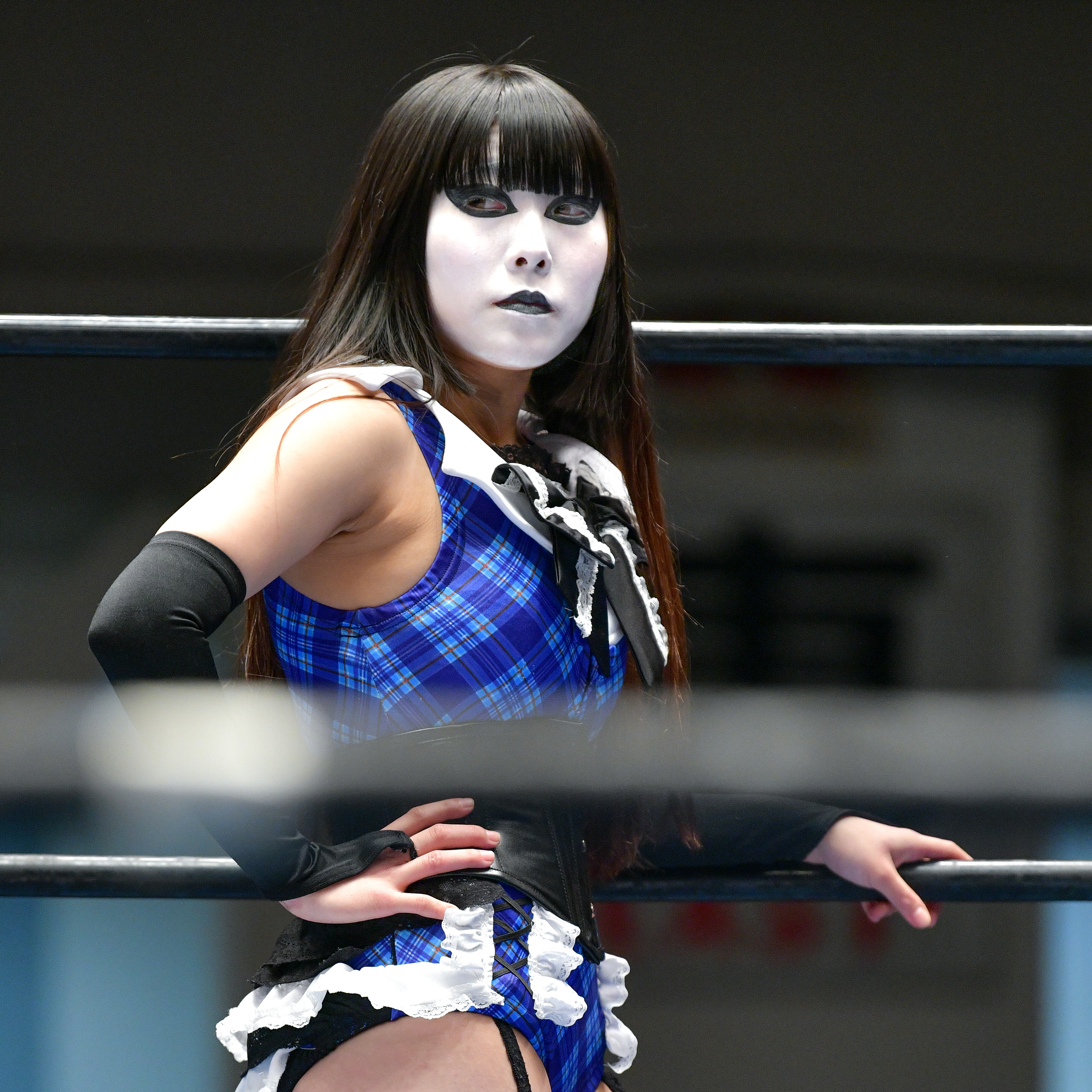
Kaicho in 2020

Ram made her return to professional wrestling on February 22, 2019, at the 666 vol. 88 show from Wrestling of Darkness 666 where she teamed up with Jun Kasai and Yasu Urano to defeat Naoshi Sano and the Sano Menhera Army in an eight-man tag team match.

=== Ice Ribbon (2019–present) ===
Ram made her return to Ice Ribbon at New Ice Ribbon #971 on July 15, 2019, where she teamed up with Akane Fujita to defeat Suzu Suzuki and Asahi in a tag team match. She quickly moved into the title picture, taking part in a tournament for the ICE Cross Infinity Championship, making it up to the quarter-finals on August 24, 2019, at New Ice Ribbon #986 where she fell short to Maya Yukihi. At New Ice Ribbon #1026 on February 24, 2020, Ram teamed up with Rina Yamashita to unsuccessfully challenge Tsukasa Fujimoto and Tsukushi Haruka for the International Ribbon Tag Team Championship. She is also known for competing in gauntlet matches such as the one from Tequila Saya's retirement show from December 31, 2019, at New Ice Ribbon #1013, a 44-person match also involving Syuri, Itsuki Aoki, Manami Toyota, Lingerie Muto, Cherry, Maika Ozaki, Ken Ohka, Hiragi Kurumi and many others. At New Ice Ribbon #977 on August 14, 2019, Ram teamed up with Giulia, Hamuko Hoshi, Hiragi Kurumi and Miyako Matsumoto to defeat Rina Yamashita, Suzu Suzuki, Thekla and Totoro Satsuki in a 5-on-4 handicap tag team match.

=== Independent circuit (2019–present) ===
As a freelancer, Ram is known for working with various promotions. At a house show promoted by Pro Wrestling Zero1 on December 6, 2020, she teamed up with Shinjiro Otani in a losing effort against Revengers (Masato Tanaka and Takuya Sugawara. At the Hana Kimura Memorial Show, an event produced by Kyoko Kimura on May 23, 2021, to commemorate one year from the death of her daughter Hana, Ram won a 28-person All-Star Battle Royal by lastly eliminating Cima and Masato Tanaka also involving notable opponents such as Shotaro Ashino, Fuminori Abe, Menso-re Oyaji and many others. At Wrestle Princess II, an event held by Tokyo Joshi Pro Wrestling (TJPW) on October 9, 2021, she teamed up with Pom Harajuku and Raku to defeat Haruna Neko, Kaya Toribami and Mahiro Kiryu. At Oz Academy All Out Attack on October 24, 2021, she teamed up with Kaori Yoneyama and Yuu in a losing effort to Ozaki-gun (Maya Yukihi, Saori Anou and Yumi Ohka). At Pro Wrestling Wave's Halloween Wave event on October 25, 2021, she teamed up with her 666 promotion teammate Onryo to defeat Sakura Hirota and Yuki Miyazaki.

=== World Wonder Ring Stardom (2022–present) ===
Kaicho made her first appearance in World Wonder Ring Stardom at Stardom New Blood 3 on July 8, 2022, where she defeated Waka Tsukiyama. She continued to make regular appearances in the New Blood events, continuing with New Blood 4 on August 26, 2022, where she teamed up with Rina to defeat Momoka Hanazono and Waka Tsukiyama. At Stardom New Blood 5 on October 19, 2022, Kaicho teamed up with Linda and Rina to defeat Cosmic Angels (Mina Shirakawa and Waka Tsukiyama) & Yuna Mizumori.

Kaicho is also known to have competed in other lower-carded pay-per-views promoted by Stardom such as the "Stardom in Showcase" events. She made her first appearance at Stardom in Showcase vol.2 on September 25, 2022, where she competed in a Falls Count Anywhere Four-Way Match in which she, alongside Mayu Iwatani and AZM defeated Maika. At Stardom in Showcase vol.3 on November 26, 2022, she competed in a soccer-themed four-way match resembling the events from the group stages of the 2022 FIFA World Cup won by Koguma and also involving AZM and Starlight Kid.

== Championships and accomplishments ==
- DDT Pro-Wrestling
  - Ironman Heavymetalweight Championship (1 time)
- Ice Ribbon
  - Triangle Ribbon Championship (2 times)
  - Ice Ribbon Year-End Award (2 times)
    - Best Enemy Award (2019, 2020)
- Pro Wrestling Illustrated
  - Ranked No. 214 of the top 250 female singles wrestlers in the PWI Women's 250 in 2023
- Spark Joshi Puroresu of America
  - Spark Joshi Pacific Championship (1 time, inaugural)
- Sukeban
  - Sukeban World Championship (1 time)
- Tama Pro
  - Tama Pro Tag Team Championship – with Tetsuhiro Kuroda (1 time)
