= Hana Kimura =

Japanese joshi puroresu wrestler (1997–2020)

Hana Kimura 木村花
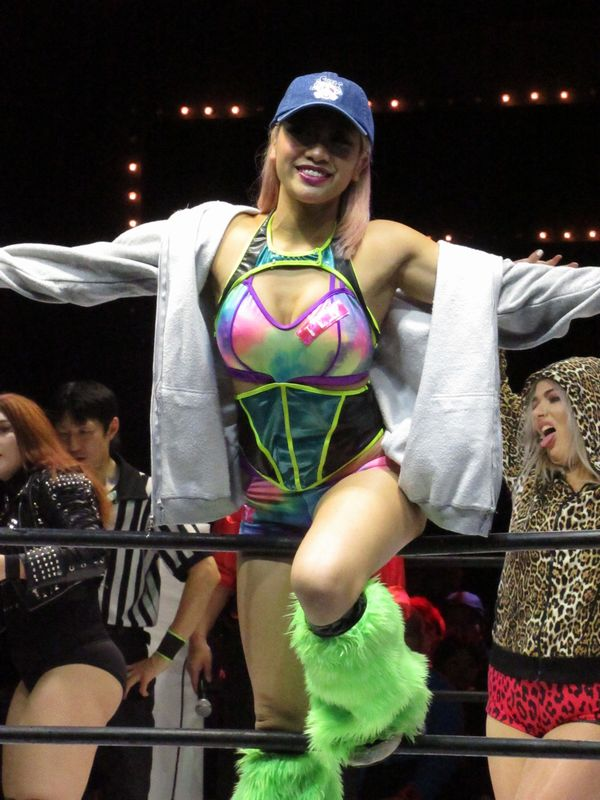
- Kimura in December 2019

Personal information
- Born: September 3, 1997 Yokohama, Japan
- Died: May 23, 2020 (aged 22) Tokyo, Japan
- Cause of death: Suicide by hydrogen sulfide inhalation
- Relative: Kyoko Kimura (mother)

Professional wrestling career
- Ring name(s): Hana Kimura; Hanita
- Billed height: 5 ft 5 in (165 cm)
- Billed weight: 128 lb (58 kg)
- Billed from: Yokohama, Japan
- Trained by: Akira Nogami
- Debut: 2016

Hana Kimura () (木村花, Kimura Hana; September 3, 1997 – May 23, 2020) was a Japanese professional wrestler. She worked for Japanese promotions such as World Wonder Ring Stardom and Wrestle-1, in addition to making appearances for foreign companies such as Ring of Honor, Pro-Wrestling: EVE, and some independent promotions in Mexico. She was a second-generation wrestler as the daughter of Kyoko Kimura.

Kimura was a cast member on the Fuji Television and Netflix reality television series Terrace House: Tokyo 2019–2020. Following a series of troubling tweets in which she addressed online bullying directed at her from Terrace House viewers, she died from suicide via hydrogen sulfide inhalation at her Tokyo apartment on May 23, 2020, at the age of 22.

== Early life ==
Kimura was born in Yokohama on September 3, 1997, the daughter of professional wrestler Kyoko Kimura. Before she was one year old, her parents separated. While the identity of her father is not publicly known, her mother has said that he is Indonesian, for which Kimura was sometimes referred to as Indonesian-Japanese. She was bullied as a child due to her hafu heritage.

== Professional wrestling career ==
=== Early career ===
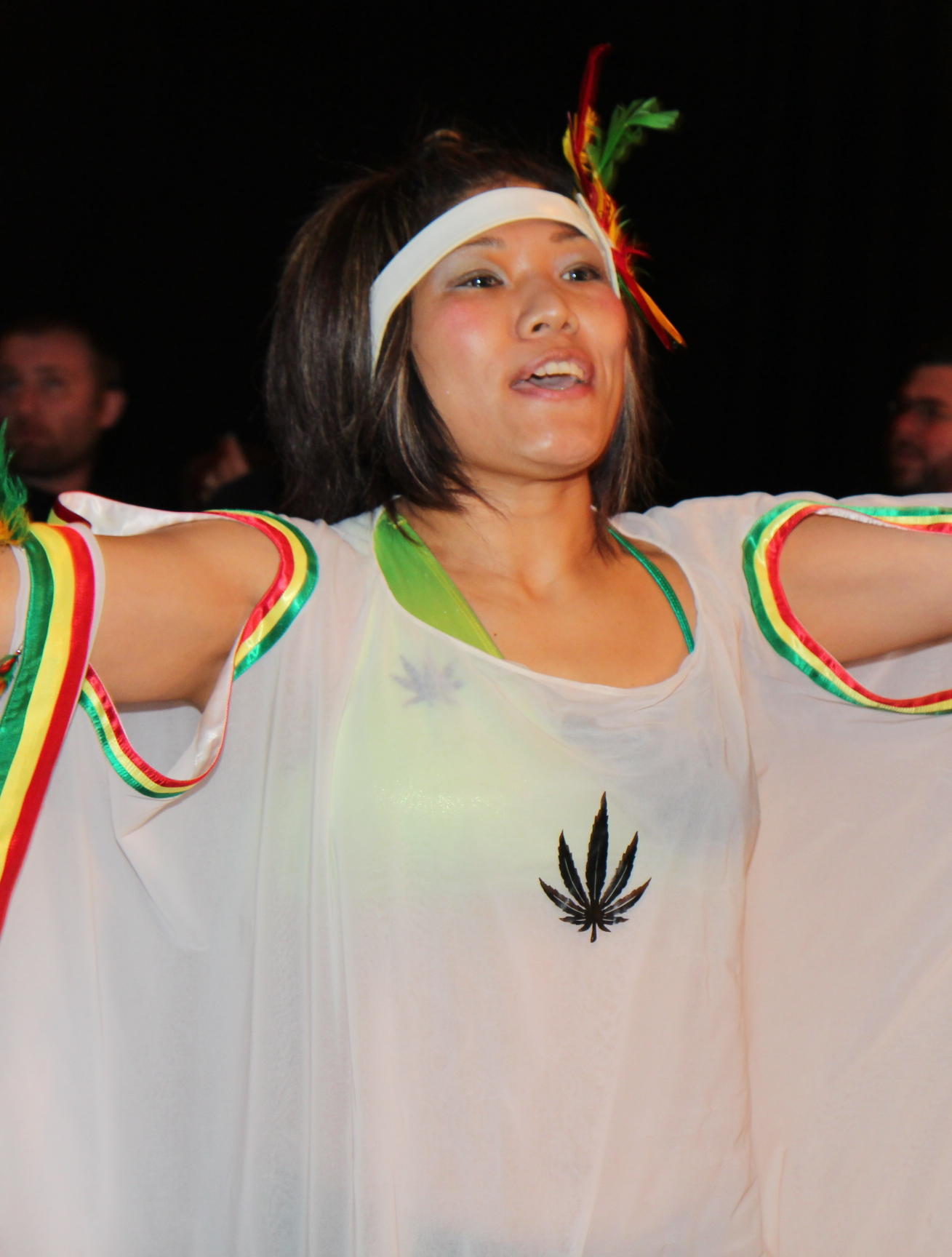
Hana was the daughter of professional wrestler Kyoko Kimura (pictured above).

Prior to her professional wrestling career, Kimura won the DDT Ironman Heavymetalweight Championship one time on August 21, 2005, at a live event in Tokyo, then lost the title to her mother Kyoko. In the 2010s, Kimura was trained by Akira Nogami at Wrestle-1's Professional Wrestling University.

=== Wrestle-1 (2016–2019) ===
After graduating the Wrestle-1 training academy, she debuted for promotion on March 30, 2016, against her classmate, Reika Saiki, in a losing effort. The pair wrestled against each other many times throughout 2016 in Wrestle-1.

On August 7, 2016, Kimura wrestled against her mother in a match. On September 18, 2016, Kimura captured her first title, the JWP Junior Championship, by defeating Yako Fujigasaki in a tournament final. She lost her JWP Junior Championship on December 28, 2016, to Yako Fujigasaki. On January 22, 2017, her mother retired. In Kyoko's retirement show, Kimura defeated her mother in a singles match and on the same show, the two teamed in a trios match in a winning effort.

During 2017, Kimura split her time between Wrestle-1, Sendai Girls' Pro Wrestling and Stardom while being a contracted performer for Wrestle-1. Kimura officially became a Wrestle-1 roster member on January 9, 2018. She made an international tour in early 2018, competing for Ring of Honor, Pro-Wrestling: EVE, and various promotions in Mexico.

On March 21, 2019, Kimura announced she was leaving Wrestle-1.

=== World Wonder Ring Stardom (2016–2020) ===
==== Oedo Tai (2016–2018) ====
On September 22, 2016, Kimura made her in-ring debut in World Wonder Ring Stardom by teaming up with Kagetsu and Kyoko Kimura to defeat JKGReeeeN and Mayu Iwatani. On October 2, 2016, Kimura teamed with her mother and Kagetsu to capture the Artist of Stardom Championship. Late in 2016, Kimura injured her wrist, which led to her going on a hiatus to recover.

Kimura eventually became a member of Stardom's heel stable, Oedo Tai. On June 21, 2017, at Stardom's Galaxy Stars 2017 event, Kimura teamed with her fellow Oedo Tai member, Kagetsu, to win the Goddesses of Stardom Championship by defeating Team Jungle (Hiroyo Matsumoto and Jungle Kyona). Kimura and Kagetsu held the titles for nearly a year, successfully defending against teams such as Jungle Kyona and HZK, Io Shirai and Viper, Jungle Kyona and Natsuko Tora, HZK and Momo Watanabe, Mayu Iwatani and Tam Nakano. The team was defeated by Mayu Iwatani and Saki Kashima in 2018.

During Kagetsu's final match in the 2018 5 Star Grand Prix on September 24, Kimura betrayed Oedo Tai by attacking Kagetsu with a chair, causing Kagetsu to lose and fail to reach the finals. Following the match, Kimura declared that she was no longer affiliated with Oedo Tai. At Mask Fiesta 2018 on October 28, Kimura, under the ring name Hanita, teamed up with La Maestra in a loss to Candy Skull and Marty Scurll.

==== Tokyo Cyber Squad (2019–2020) ====
She officially joined Stardom on March 25, 2019. On April 14, at the 2019 Stardom draft, Hana was named leader of the International Army faction, later known as Tokyo Cyber Squad. On May 16, Kimura, along with her stablemates Jungle Kyona and Konami won the Artist of Stardom Championship after defeating Mayu Iwatani, Saki Kashima, and Tam Nakano.

On January 4, 2020, Kimura, along with Giulia wrestled Mayu Iwatani and Arisa Hoshiki in a dark match at New Japan Pro-Wrestling's Wrestle Kingdom 14. It was the first women's match at the Tokyo Dome since 2002. Kimura had her final match on March 24 at Stardom's Cinderella Tournament 2020, wrestling Mayu Iwatani in the first round to a draw.

During her Stardom career, she won the Artist of Stardom Championship twice and the Goddesses of Stardom championship once, while also winning the 2019 5★Star GP tournament and Stardom Fighting Spirit Award.

=== Ring of Honor (2018–2019) ===
In 2018 Hana entered the inaugural Women of Honor Championship tournament in Ring of Honor (ROH) but she lost to Sumie Sakai in the first round. On April 6, Kimura, along with Stella Grey and Sumie Sakai wrestled Jenny Rose and Oedo Tai (Kagetsu and Hazuki) in a dark match at Ring of Honor and New Japan Pro-Wrestling's G1 Supercard.

== Appearance on Terrace House and other ventures ==
Kimura joined the reality television series Terrace House: Tokyo 2019–2020 in September 2019, appearing on the show until her death. One episode filmed in early January 2020 showed Kimura involved in a verbal conflict with her housemate, Kai Edward Kobayashi, for damaging her wrestling attire; after the episode aired in March 2020, her actions drew criticism, name calling, and racist cyberbullying from social media users, sending her into depression. The release of new Terrace House episodes was suspended as a result of Kimura's death, and Fuji TV later cancelled the season.

Before her death, Kimura was set to co-star with Ena Fujita in the music video for the musician's June 2020 single "Dead Stroke" and Lalo the Don's "Til The Break of Don", recorded before the COVID-19 pandemic and uploaded on YouTube on May 20, 2021.

== Death ==
Early in the morning of May 23, 2020, Kimura posted self-harm images on Twitter and Instagram while sharing some of the hateful comments she received. Later that day, she was found dead in her Tokyo apartment at the age of 22. Dave Meltzer revealed three days later that the cause of death was hydrogen sulfide inhalation. By December 2020, the death was ruled a suicide.

On December 15, 2020, police announced that they had arrested a man in his mid-20s for cyberbullying. The man, who resides in Osaka Prefecture, admitted to the allegations and was quoted by the police as saying he "couldn't forgive Kimura's attitude on the program". On March 30, 2021, the Tokyo Prosecutors Office indicted the man for online abuse directed at Kimura, but was not obliged to face trial under the indictment as is often the case for relatively minor offenses in Japan. He was issued a fine of ¥9,000 (equivalent to $80), which prompted concerns that the punishment was too light. Kimura's mother Kyoko Kimura filed a suit seeking more than $20,000 in damages from the man.

On April 5, 2021, Tokyo Metropolitan Police charged a second man in his late 30s for online abuse he sent to Kimura. They said the second man, from Fukui Prefecture, admitted to the allegations during voluntary questioning, with investigative sources quoting him as saying, "Many hateful messages had been posted, and I followed suit. I'm sorry." When asked why he did it, he said he was "simply joining in with what he saw others doing on her site".

On January 22, 2021, Kyoko filed a lawsuit with the Tokyo District Court seeking damages of around ¥2.94 million ($27,000) against a third man for causing emotional distress to her family. The third man, from Nagano Prefecture, reportedly posted hateful messages about Kimura's death in May 2020. On May 19, 2021, Japanese judge Momoko Ikehara ordered the third man to pay ¥1.29 million (US$12,000).

=== Legacy and tributes ===
On the day of Kimura's death, several professional wrestling companies such as New Japan Pro-Wrestling, National Wrestling Alliance, Ring of Honor, All Elite Wrestling, Impact Wrestling, among other companies sent their condolences. During AEW's Double or Nothing pay-per-view event, they paid tribute to Kimura and Shad Gaspard, who died that same week.

On the May 27, 2020 episode of WWE NXT, Io Shirai and commentator Mauro Ranallo paid tribute to Kimura. Shirai said, "Hana was one of the most talented female wrestlers in the world, and I was looking forward to watching her grow to see how far she could go. I will always remember her smile that would brighten up any room she walked into. It is so important that we all love and treat each other with respect." On the May 29 episode of WWE SmackDown, Sasha Banks wore a black armband that said "HANA" in white letters. On the June 2 episode of WWE Raw, Kairi Sane wrote a message on her umbrella that read "花ちゃん、ありがとう" ("Hana-chan, thank you"). At NXT TakeOver: In Your House on June 7, Dakota Kai sported pink hair that she confirmed was dyed as a tribute to Kimura. On June 21, World Wonder Ring Stardom had its first event during the COVID-19 pandemic; before the event, they paid tribute to Kimura with all the wrestlers at ringside for a traditional ten-bell salute. Kimura's fellow Terrace House cast member Peppe drew her in the third volume of his manga series Mingo, which was released on July 10. On the September 3 episode of AEW Dynamite, Kenny Omega wore a Hana Kimura shirt on what would have been her 23rd birthday. The shirt was released on Pro Wrestling Tees with all the proceeds going to Kimura's mother. At NJPW's Battle in the Valley on February 18, 2023, Mercedes Moné (formerly known as Sasha Banks) again paid homage to Kimura by wearing an outfit similar to what Kimura wore after leaving Oedo Tai.

In response to Kimura's online bullying, Japan's parliament passed a new "online insults" law in June 2022. Offenders convicted of online insults can be jailed for up to one year or fined ¥300,000 ($2,200).

==== Memorial shows ====
On March 31, 2021, Kyoko Kimura launched the anti-bullying non-profit organization Remember Hana. As a result, the annual Hana Kimura Memorial Show series commenced on May 23, 2021.

== Championships and accomplishments ==
- Dramatic Dream Team
  - Ironman Heavymetalweight Championship (1 time)
- JWP Joshi Puroresu
  - Princess of Pro-Wrestling Championship (1 time) (101 days)
  - JWP Junior Championship (1 time) (101 days)
  - JWP Junior Championship Tournament (2016)
  - Princess of Pro-Wrestling Tournament (2016)
- Pro Wrestling Illustrated
  - Ranked No. 60 of the top 100 female wrestlers in the PWI Women's 100 in 2018
- World Wonder Ring Stardom
  - Artist of Stardom Championship (2 times) – with Jungle Kyona and Konami (1) (38 days), Kagetsu and Kyoko Kimura (1) (97 days)
  - Goddesses of Stardom Championship (1 time) – with Kagetsu (347 days)
  - 5★Star GP (2019)
  - Stardom Year-End Award (2 times)
    - Best Tag Team Award (2017) with Kagetsu
    - Fighting Spirit Award (2019)

== See also ==
- List of premature professional wrestling deaths
