= Kyoko Kimura =

Japanese professional wrestler and mixed martial artist

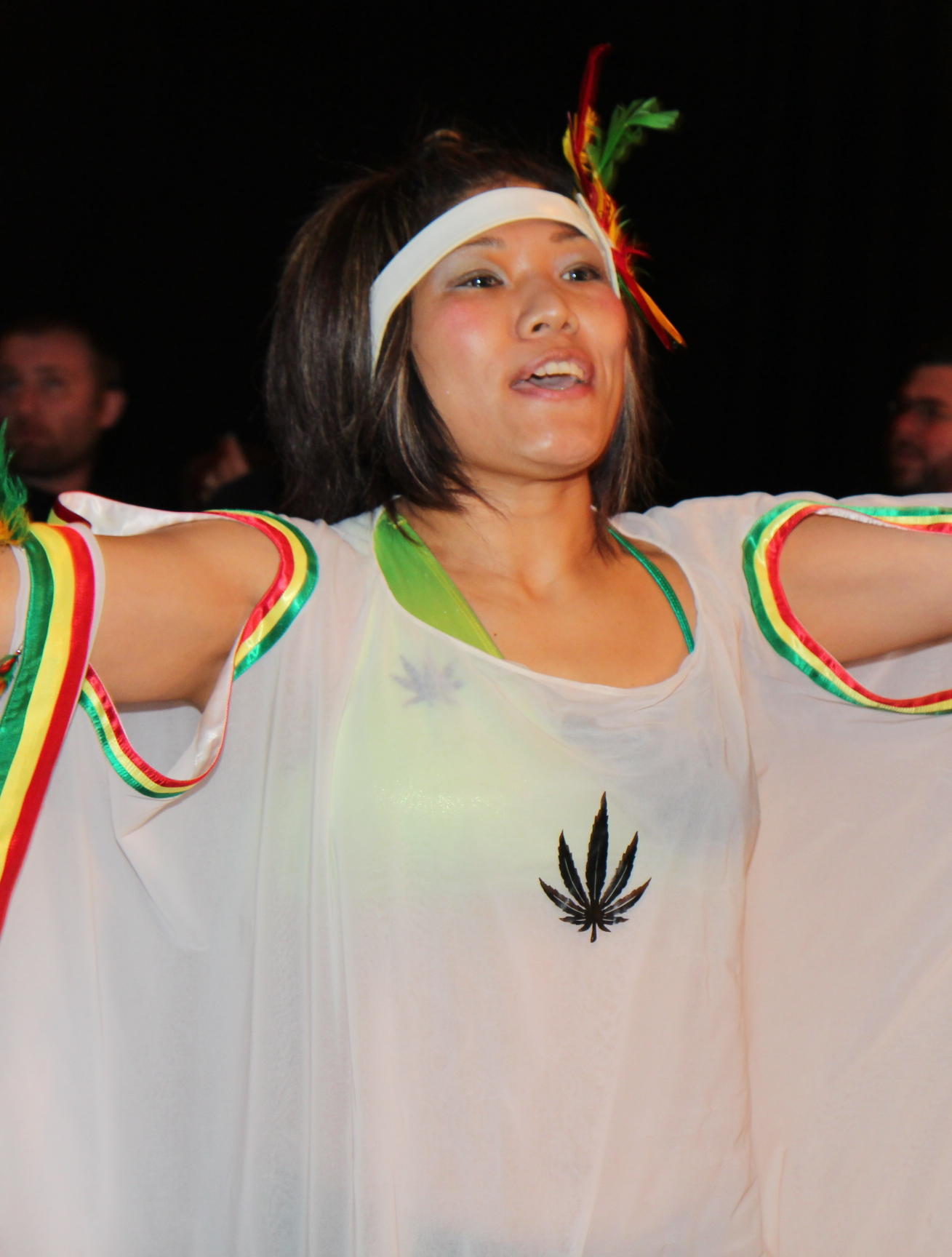
- Kimura in March 2015

Personal information
- Born: March 19, 1977 (age 49) Yokohama, Kanagawa, Japan
- Spouse: Isao Kobayashi (m. 2016)
- Children: Hana Kimura

Professional wrestling career
- Ring name(s): Caribbean Kim; Kyoko Kimura; Mask de Sun; Yanbaru Queen Na
- Billed height: 1.64 m (5 ft 4 1/2 in)
- Billed weight: 62 kg (137 lb)
- Debut: July 20, 2003
- Retired: January 22, 2017

Kyoko Kimura (Japanese: 木村 響子, Hepburn: Kimura Kyōko; born March 19, 1977) is a Japanese retired professional wrestler and mixed martial artist. Throughout her 14-year career, she competed in Big Japan Pro Wrestling, Ibuki, Ice Ribbon, JWP Joshi Puroresu, NEO Japan Ladies Pro-Wrestling and World Wonder Ring Stardom, among other promotions. She is best known for her Jamaican flag shirt and puffed afro that at one point stood at roughly one foot tall. She is known for wrestling in barbed wire deathmatches as well as her singles bouts. She retired from professional wrestling in January 2017.

== Professional wrestling career ==
=== Independent circuit (2003–2017) ===
Kimura started her professional wrestling career in the JWP Joshi Puroresu promotion, making her debut on July 20, 2003. She remained with the promotion in a small role for over two years, before quitting in late 2005 and becoming a freelancer. During the following years, Kimura made appearances for promotions such as Ibuki, Oz Academy, and Pro Wrestling Wave, while also making her debut in death matches.

Kimura's first major role in professional wrestling came in the NEO Japan Ladies Pro-Wrestling promotion, where, in 2008, she became the leader of the villainous Revolucion Amandla stable, which also included Tomoka Nakagawa and Atsuko Emoto, with whom Kimura held the NEO Tag Team Championship. In October 2009, Revolucion Amandla also made a tour of Mexico. Kimura remained a regular for NEO until the promotion folded in December 2010, with her stable being involved in major storyline rivalries with Las Cachorras Orientales (Etsuko Mita and Mima Shimoda) and Passion Red (Kana, Nanae Takahashi and Natsuki☆Taiyo).

On May 4, Kimura teamed with Command Bolshoi to defeat Rabbit Miu and Tsukushi for JWP Joshi Puroresu's vacant Daily Sports Women's Tag Team and JWP Tag Team Championships. On October 15, Kimura and Tomoka Nakagawa, the reformed Revolucion Amandla, won Pro Wrestling Wave's 2014 Dual Shock Wave tournament and the Wave Tag Team Championship.

=== World Wonder Ring Stardom (2012–2017) ===
In May 2012, Kimura began working regularly for the World Wonder Ring Stardom promotion, where she joined the villainous Kawasaki Katsushika Saikyou Densetsu Plus One stable. However, after losing a battle against Natsuki☆Taiyo for the leadership of the stable, Kimura quit the stable on August 5 and formed the new Kimura Monster-gun stable with Hailey Hatred. From August 19 to September 30, Kimura took part in the first ever 5★Star GP, making it to the finals, before losing to Yuzuki Aikawa. In September, Kimura also began working regularly for the Ice Ribbon promotion, culminating on her and Sayaka Obihiro winning the International Ribbon Tag Team and Reina World Tag Team Championships on December 19, 2012, the latter title owned by the Reina X World promotion. On January 14, 2013, Kimura received her first shot at Stardom's top title, the World of Stardom Championship, but was defeated by the defending champion, Nanae Takahashi. On March 17, Kimura and Hatred defeated Kawasaki Katsushika Saikyou Densetsu (Natsuki☆Taiyo and Yoshiko) to win the Goddesses of Stardom Championship. The following November, Kimura teamed with two other Monster-gun stablemates, Alpha Female and The Female Predator "Amazon", to win the Artist of Stardom Championship. During November, Kimura also teamed with Act Yasukawa to win the 2013 Goddesses of Stardom Tag League. On January 26, 2014, Kimura became the first two-time Goddesses of Stardom Champion, when she won title alongside Alpha Female. On January 18, 2015, Kimura formed a new version of Monster-gun, named Oedo Tai, with Act Yasukawa, Dragonita, Heidi Lovelace, Hudson Envy and Kris Wolf.

On April 11, 2015, Kimura made her American debut for Shimmer Women Athletes.

On August 7, 2016, Kimura defeated her daughter Hana in the first match between the two. Following the match, she announced she would be holding her retirement event on January 22, 2017. Kimura went on to win a championship with her daughter, when the two, along with Kagetsu, won the Artist of Stardom Championship on October 2, 2016. Kimura held her retirement event, entitled "Last Afro", on January 22, 2017, in Korakuen Hall. In what was advertised as her retirement match, Kimura teamed with her daughter Hana and husband Isao in a six-person tag team match, where they were defeated by Aja Kong, Meiko Satomura and Minoru Suzuki with Satomura pinning her for the win. Afterwards, Kimura wrestled one more bonus match against her daughter, refereed by her husband. Hana pinned Kyoko with a big boot to end her career.

== Personal life ==
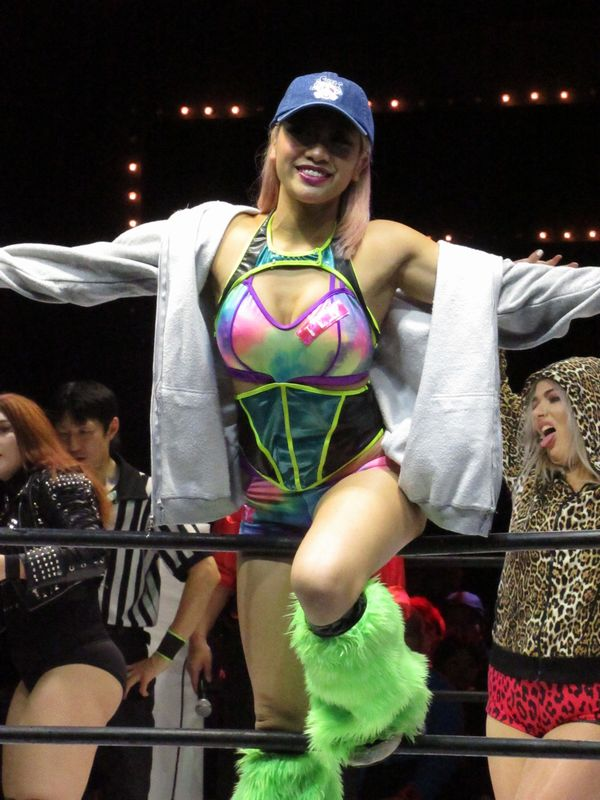
Kyoko's daughter Hana Kimura in 2019

In 2016, Kimura married professional wrestler and mixed martial artist Isao Kobayashi, better known simply as Isao. Her daughter Hana was also a professional wrestler until her death in 2020.

== Championships and accomplishments ==
- Dramatic Dream Team
  - Ironman Heavymetalweight Championship (1 time)
- Ice Ribbon
  - International Ribbon Tag Team Championship (1 time) – with Sayaka Obihiro
- JWP Joshi Puroresu
  - Daily Sports Women's Tag Team Championship (2 times) – with Command Bolshoi (1) and Hanako Nakamori (1)
  - JWP Openweight Championship (1 time)
  - JWP Tag Team Championship (2 times) – with Command Bolshoi (1) and Hanako Nakamori (1)
  - JWP Year End-Award (3 times)
    - Best Bout Award (2003) with Azumi Hyuga and Yuki Miyazaki vs. Command Bolshoi, Erika Watanabe and Kayoko Haruyama on August 16
    - Enemy Award (2014, 2016)
- NEO Japan Ladies Pro-Wrestling
  - NEO Tag Team Championship (2 times) – with Amazing Kong (1) and Atsuko Emoto (1)
- Pro Wrestling SUN
  - SUN Championship (1 time)
- Pro Wrestling Wave
  - Wave Tag Team Championship (1 time) – with Tomoka Nakagawa
  - 6-Person Tag Tournament (2013) – with Gami and Tomoka Nakagawa
  - Dual Shock Wave (2014) – with Tomoka Nakagawa
  - Catch the Wave Award (1 time)
    - Best Bout Award (2014) vs. Sakura Hirota on May 13
- Reina X World
  - Reina World Tag Team Championship (1 time) – with Sayaka Obihiro
- World Woman Pro-Wrestling Diana
  - WWWD World Championship (1 time)
- World Wonder Ring Stardom
  - Artist of Stardom Championship (2 times) – with Alpha Female and The Female Predator Amazon (1), and Hana Kimura and Kagetsu (1)
  - Goddesses of Stardom Championship (3 times) – with Hailey Hatred (1), Alpha Female (1), and Kagetsu (1)
  - Goddesses of Stardom Tag League (2013) – with Act Yasukawa
  - 5★Star GP Award (2 time)
    - 5★Star GP Finalist Award (2012)
    - 5★Star GP Fighting Spirit Award (2013)

== Mixed martial arts career ==
Kimura made her mixed martial arts debut against Megumi Yabushita at Pancrase Impressive Tour 11 on November 12, 2011. She won the fight by TKO (doctor stoppage) after Yabushita suffered an ankle injury in the first round.

Kimura next faced Mizuho Sato at Pancrase Progress Tour 1 on January 28, 2012. The match ended in a unanimous draw.

On April 1, 2012, Kimura faced South Korean Kim Sung Eun at Pancrase Progress Tour 4, winning the match via TKO in 61 seconds.

On May 20, 2012, Kimura suffered her first MMA loss when she was submitted by Rin Nakai at Pancrase Progress Tour 6.

== Mixed martial arts record ==
Professional record breakdown
4 matches	2 wins	1 loss
By knockout	2	0
By submission	0	1
Draws	1	

Res.	Record	Opponent	Method	Event	Date	Round	Time	Location	Notes
Loss	2-1-1	Rin Nakai	Submission (armbar)	Pancrase Progress Tour 6	May 20, 2012	1	4:32	Okinawa, Okinawa, Japan	
Win	2-0-1	Kim Sung Eun	TKO (punches)	Pancrase Progress Tour 4	April 1, 2012	1	1:01	Ariake, Tokyo, Japan	
Draw	1-0-1	Mizuho Sato	Draw (unanimous)	Pancrase Progress Tour 1	January 28, 2012	2	5:00	Ariake, Tokyo, Japan	
Win	1-0-0	Megumi Yabushita	TKO (doctor stoppage)	Pancrase: Impressive Tour 11	November 12, 2011	1	5:00	Kabukicho, Tokyo, Japan	
