= Lena Kross =

Australian professional wrestler

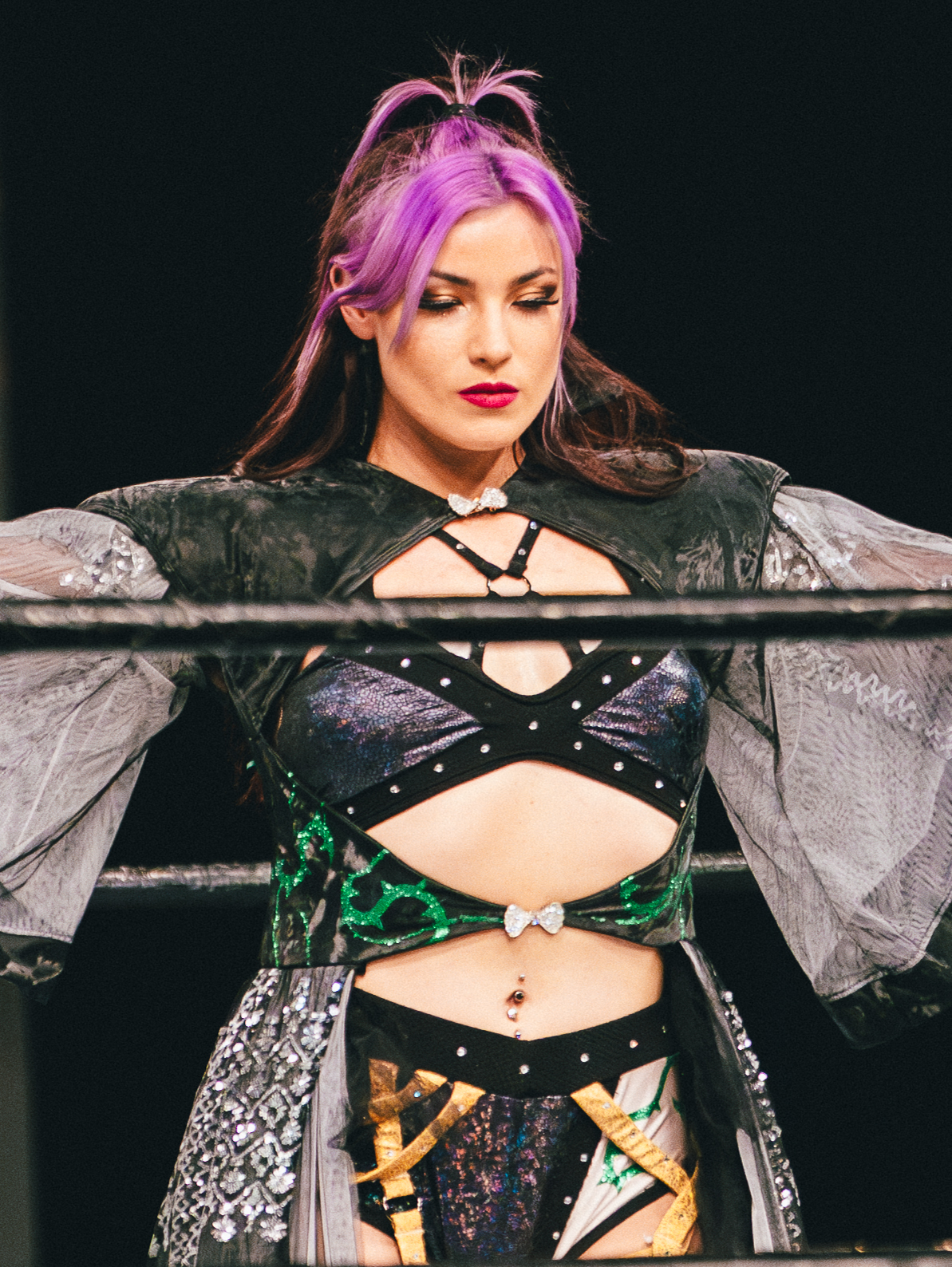
- Kross in April 2025

Personal information
- Born: 1 April 1995 (age 31) Perth, Australia

Professional wrestling career
- Ring name: Lena Kross
- Billed height: 183 cm (6 ft 0 in)
- Debut: 27 May 2017

Lena Kross (born 1 April 1995) is an Australian professional wrestler. As of February 2026, she is signed to All Elite Wrestling (AEW), where she is a former one-time AEW Women's World Tag Team Champion with Megan Bayne as Divine Dominion. She is best known for her tenures with various promotions from the Australian independent scene such as World Series Wrestling (WSW) and from Japan such as Sendai Girls' Pro Wrestling.

== Professional wrestling career ==
=== Independent circuit (2017–present) ===
Kross made her professional wrestling debut at NHPW Global Conflict, an event promoted by New Horizon Pro Wrestling (NHPW) on 27 May 2017, where she teamed up with FaceBrooke and unsuccessfully competed in a four-way tag team match won by King Shahil and Tyra Russamee, and also involving Michael Morleone and Michael Spencer. She competed in the promotion as a regular wrestler between 2017 and 2021, and is a former one-time NHPW Art Of Fighting and one-time Warrior Rising Champion.

Kross competed in several of Progress Wrestling's Chapter series of events. She made her first appearance at Chapter 169: The Devil On My Shoulder on 28 July 2024, where she unsuccessfully challenged Rhio for the Progress World Women's Championship. Chapter 170: Wrestling Never Sleeps on 26 August 2024, Kross teamed up with Debbie Keitel and Nina Samuels in a losing effort against Kanji and The Experience (LA Taylor and Skye Smitson).

At HOG Believe In The Glory, an event promoted by House of Glory on 9 October 2024, Kross unsuccessfully challenged Megan Bayne for the HOG Women's Championship.

At Spark Joshi Lady Luck on 17 April 2025, Kross fell short to Hazuki for the vacant Spark Joshi World Championship.

In the 2025 edition of Game Changer Wrestling's Joey Janela's Spring Break, Kross competed in the traditional Clusterfuck Battle Royal. the bout also involved various notable opponents such as Joey Janela, 2 Tuff Tony, The Warlord, Juventud Guerrera, Paul London and others, but was won by Brodie Lee Jr.

At DPW 4th Anniversary, an event promoted by Deadlock Pro-Wrestling on 12 December 2025, Kross unsuccessfully challenged Mei Suruga for the vacant DPW Women's Worlds Championship.

=== Japan (2022–present) ===
Kross began competing in the Japanese independent scene in 2023. Her first match took place on the second night of the AJPW Giant Series 2023, an event promoted by All Japan Pro Wrestling where she teamed up with Diamond Egoist (Aoi and Michiko Miyagi) in a losing effort against Chihiro Hashimoto, Millie McKenzie and Yurika Oka. She then competed at DDT Yubun 100th Anniversary, an event promoted by DDT Pro-Wrestling on 12 September 2023, where she teamed up with Oka in a losing effort against Hashimoto and McKenzie in tag team competition.

In Japan, Kross has mainly wrestled in Sendai Girls' Pro Wrestling. At Sendai Girls Big Show In Niigata on 9 November 2024, Kross teamed up with Veny and defeated Team 200 kg (Chihiro Hashimoto and Yuu) to win the Sendai Girls Tag Team Championship. They dropped the titles two months later at Sendai Girls Big Show In Sendai on 8 December, to Bob Bob Momo Banana (Mio Momono and Yurika Oka).

=== All Elite Wrestling (2025–present) ===
Kross made her All Elite Wrestling (AEW) debut on the 31 July 2025 episode of AEW Collision, where she was defeated by Kris Statlander.

At Grand Slam Australia on 14 February 2026, Kross returned to AEW as a signed talent, attacking the reigning AEW Women's World Tag Team Champions Babes of Wrath (Harley Cameron and Willow Nightingale), and aligning with MegaBad (Megan Bayne and Penelope Ford). After Ford got injured, Kross and Bayne became known as Divine Dominion. At Revolution on 15 March 2026, Kross unsuccessfully challenged Nightingale for the AEW TBS Championship, but Divine Dominion defeated Babes of Wrath to win the AEW Women's World Tag Team Championship that same night. Divine Dominion would then defeat the Babes of Wrath in a rematch to retain the titles on the 27 March episode of Collision. On 12 April on the Zero Hour pre-show of Dynasty, Divine Dominion successfully defended their titles against Hyan and Maya World. On 30 August at All In, Divine Dominion lost their titles to The Brawling Birds (Jamie Hayter and Alex Windsor), ending their reign at 168 days. On November 4, Divine Dominion competed in a six-on-six Blood and Guts match at the namesake event, where their team was defeated.

== Championships and accomplishments ==
- All Elite Wrestling
  - AEW Women's World Tag Team Championship (1 time) – with Megan Bayne
- Pro Wrestling Illustrated
  - Ranked No. 92 of the top 250 female singles wrestlers in the PWI Women's 250 in 2023
- Sendai Girls' Pro Wrestling
  - Sendai Girls Tag Team Championship (1 time) – with Veny
- World Series Wrestling
  - WSW Women's Championship (1 time)
