= Millie McKenzie =

English professional wrestler (born 2000)

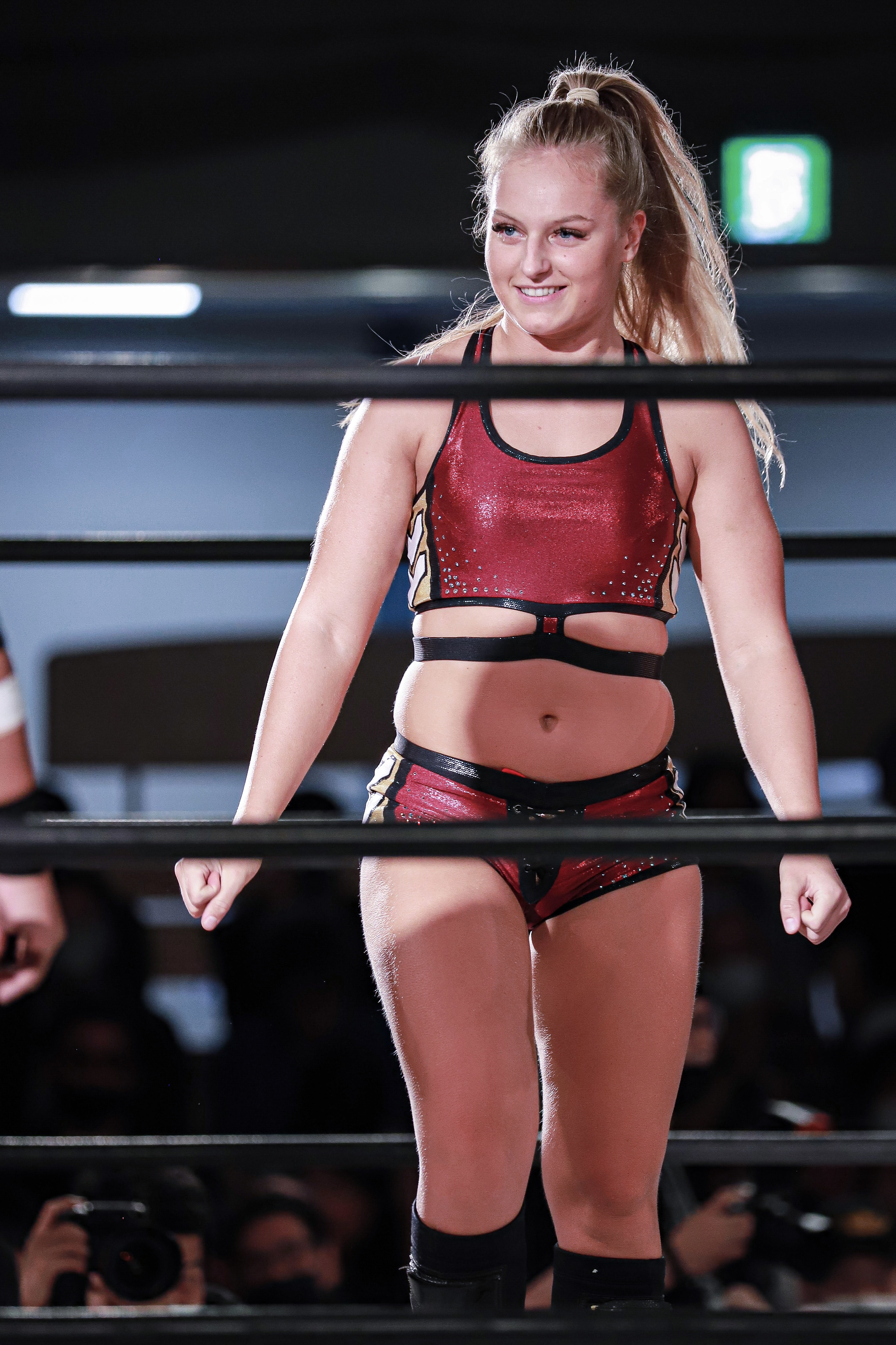
- McKenzie in July 2023

Personal information
- Born: Millie Mai McKenzie; 17 June 2000 (age 26) Coventry, England

Professional wrestling career
- Ring names: Emilia McKenzie; Millie Marks; Millie McKenzie
- Billed height: 1.68 m (5 ft 6 in)
- Billed weight: 58 kg (128 lb)
- Trained by: Martin Zaki; Pete Dunne; Travis Banks
- Debut: 17 October 2016

Millie Mai McKenzie (born 17 June 2000) is an English professional wrestler. She is known for her time in WWE, where she performed on the NXT UK brand under the ring name Emilia McKenzie. She has also wrestled for Progress Wrestling, Revolution Pro Wrestling, and Sendai Girls' Pro Wrestling.

== Early life ==
Millie Mai McKenzie was born in Coventry on 17 June 2000.

== Professional wrestling career ==
=== Progress Wrestling (2017–2019) ===
McKenzie was trained by Martin Zaki, Pete Dunne, and Travis Banks. She made her debut for Progress Wrestling on 10 October 2017 in Progress Women's Title #1 Contendership Tournament First, being defeated by Sierra Loxton, and that same night losing in the second round to Jinny. At Chapter 60: Unboxing Live! 2 - Unbox Harder, McKenzie defeated Candyfloss, Chakara, Charlie Morgan, Charli Evans and Sierra Loxton.

=== Revolution Pro Wrestling (2018) ===
On 6 January 2018, McKenzie made her debut for Revolution Pro Wrestling competed in the RPW British Women's Championship tournament. She defeated Charli Evans in the first round. The next day, McKenzie was eliminated by Jinny in the second round.

=== WWE (2018–2022) ===
McKenzie joined WWE's NXT UK branch and would enter a tournament for the inaugural NXT UK Women's Championship, where she was defeated by Jinny in the first round. On 9 June 2019, it was reported that she had rejected a WWE contract at the beginning of the year. On 16 February 2021, it was announced that McKenzie had signed a contract with WWE. On 8 April, under the ring name Emilia McKenzie, she teamed with Meiko Satomura to defeat Kay Lee Ray and Isla Dawn in her return match. On 18 August 2022, she was released from her WWE contract.

=== Sendai Girls' Pro Wrestling (2019–2023) ===
McKenzie made her debut for Sendai Girls' Pro Wrestling on 6 January 2019, defeating Ayame Sasamura to become the Sendai Girls Junior Champion. She became the Sendai Girls World Champion by beating VENY at Korakuen Hall in Tokyo on 16 July 2023, and lost it to Mika Iwata in Sendai on 18 September 2023.

== Personal life ==
McKenzie began a relationship with New Zealand wrestler Travis Banks, who was training her at the time, when she was 17 and he was 30. As part of the Speaking Out movement three years later, she accused him of using his position of trust and authority to manipulate her, put her through mental and emotional abuse, and harass her. She also accused him of doing the same to other trainees and released screenshots of her text message exchanges with him. Banks was soon released by both Progress and WWE. He later admitted to the relationship but called it consensual and said, "After seeing these comments, I can only repeat my apology. I am truly sorry for any pain caused by the relationship."

== Championships and accomplishments ==
- Championship Xtreme Wrestling
  - CXW Women's Championship (1 time, current)
- Coventry Pro Wrestling
  - CPW Lineal Women's Championship (1 time, current)
  - CPW Women's Championship (1 time, current)
- Defiant Wrestling
  - Defiant Women's Championship (1 time)
- Elevation Wrestling
  - Elevation Women's Championship (1 time)
- Fight Forever Wrestling
  - Fight Forever Women's World Championship (1 time)
- Full Force Wrestling
  - FFW Women's Championship (1 time, current)
- Ironfist Wrestling
  - Ironfist Women's Championship (1 time)
- Kamikaze Pro
  - Kamikaze Pro Tag Team Championship (1 time) - with Chief Deputy Dunne and Los Federales Santos Jr.
- Pro-Wrestling: EVE
  - Pro-Wrestling: EVE Tag Team Championship (1 time) – with Charli Evans
  - SHE-1 (2019)
- Pro Wrestling Illustrated
  - Ranked No. 52 of the top 100 female wrestlers in the PWI Women's 100 in 2020
- REACH Wrestling
  - REACH Women's Championship (1 time)
- RIPTIDE Wrestling
  - Brighton Spirit Tag Team Trophy (1 time) - with Charli Evans
- RISE Underground Pro Wrestling
  - Women's Wrestling Underground Championship (1 time, current)
- Sendai Girls' Pro Wrestling
  - Sendai Girls Tag Team Championship (1 time)
  - Sendai Girls Junior Championship (1 time)
  - Sendai Girls World Tag Team Championship (1 time) – with Charli Evans
  - First Triple Crown Champion
- The Wrestling Revolver
  - Revolver Tag Team Championship (1 time) – with Pete Dunne
- Tyris Wrestling
  - Tyris Absolute Championship (1 time)
- WrestlingKULT
  - Women of Kult Championship (1 time)
