= Meiko Satomura =

Japanese professional wrestler (born 1979)

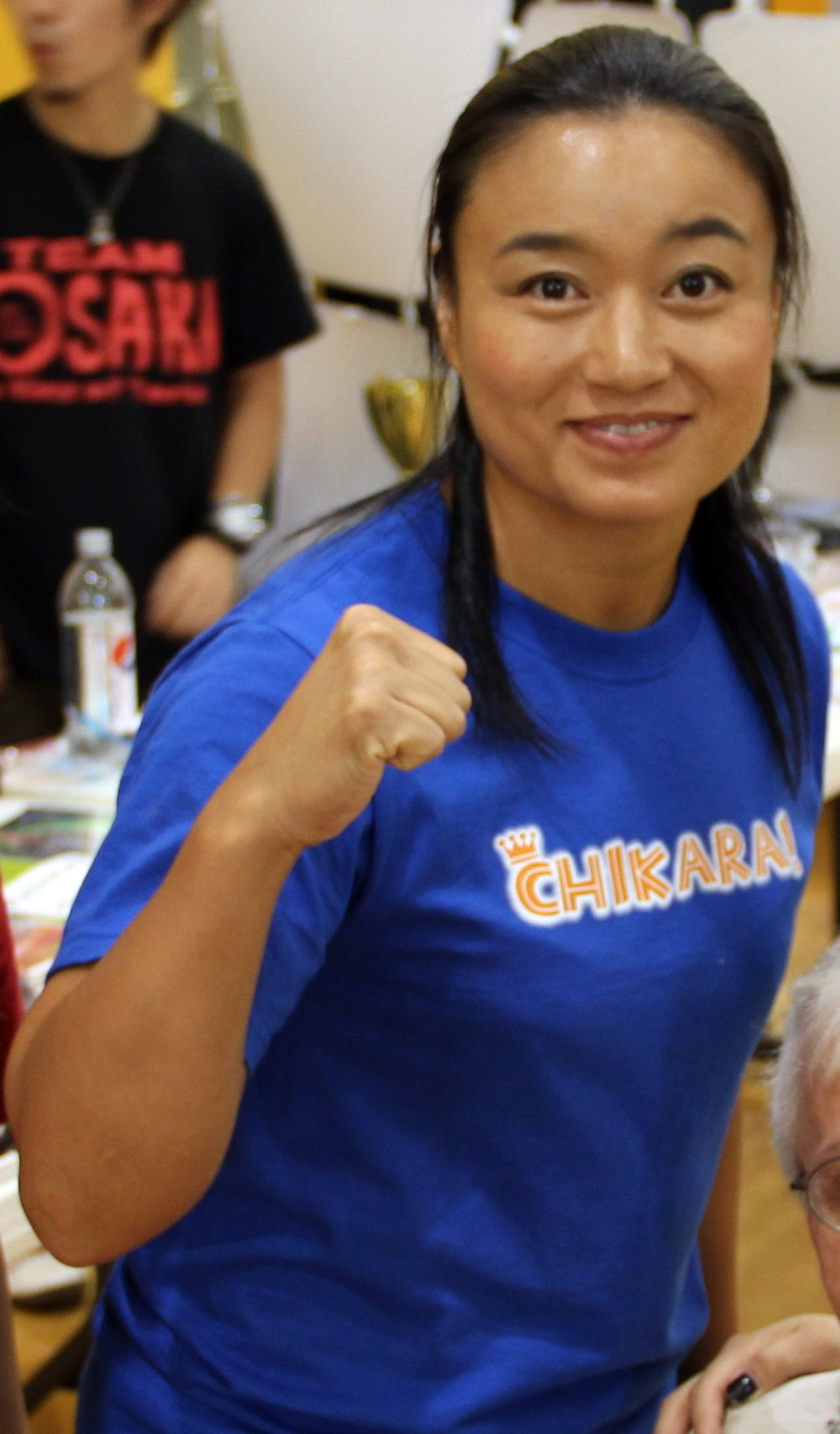
- Satomura in 2012

Personal information
- Born: November 17, 1979 (age 46) Niigata, Japan

Professional wrestling career
- Ring name: Meiko Satomura
- Billed height: 1.57 m (5 ft 2 in)
- Billed weight: 68 kg (150 lb)
- Billed from: Niigata, Japan
- Trained by: Chigusa Nagayo
- Debut: April 15, 1995
- Retired: April 29, 2025

Meiko Satomura (里村 明衣子, Satomura Meiko; born November 17, 1979) is a Japanese retired professional wrestler. She is known for her time in American promotion WWE and in Japanese promotion Sendai Girls' Pro Wrestling. She is the former two-time Sendai Girls World Champion and a former one-time NXT UK Women's Champion. Known in Japan as the "Yokozuna of the Women's Wrestling World" (女子プロレス界の横綱, Joshi puroresu-kai no yokozuna) and also known as the "Final Boss" of women's wrestling, she is characterized by her hard-hitting, traditionalist style of wrestling, having been trained by Chigusa Nagayo.

Satomura wrestled for 30 years in Japan and internationally, competing in promotions such as World Championship Wrestling (WCW), World Wonder Ring Stardom, and Chikara. She retired on April 29, 2025 in Korakuen Hall.

== Professional wrestling career ==
=== Gaea Japan (1995–2005) ===
Satomura made her professional wrestling debut for women's promotion Gaea Japan on April 15, 1995, defeating Sonoko Kato. On November 2, 1996, she and Kato defeated Sugar Sato and Chikayo Nagashima to become the inaugural AAAW Tag Team Champions. Satomura would go on to win that title on two more occasions, teaming with Ayako Hamada and Nagashima. She also won the AAAW Singles Championship twice, with her second reign ending at the hands of Aja Kong on April 3, 2005. Gaea Japan closed a week later on April 10, 2005, after staging its farewell show; in the main event, Satomura defeated her trainer Chigusa Nagayo.

=== World Championship Wrestling (1996–1997) ===
In 1996, Satomura started appearing for World Championship Wrestling (WCW) through Gaea Japan's working relationship with WCW which was attempting to establish a women's division. She participated in an eight-woman tournament for the inaugural WCW Women's World Championship; however, Satomura was eliminated in the first round by eventual winner Akira Hokuto. When WCW introduced a WCW Women's Cruiserweight Championship, a second title for the women, she entered that tournament; however, Satomura was knocked out in the first round by Toshie Uematsu, who went on to win the tournament. Satomura continued to make appearances for WCW until the business relationships between two promotions ended.

=== Sendai Girls' Pro Wrestling (2006–present) ===
Following Gaea Japan's closure, Satomura formed the women's promotion Sendai Girls' Pro Wrestling with Jinsei Shinzaki. On September 23, 2009, she participated in the Splash J and Running G tournament along with Kaoru and Tomoko Kuzumi. In the semi-final, Satomura's team defeated the Dynamite Kansai (Makie Numao and Yasuko Kuragaki), to advance to the final. In the final, they defeated the team of Hikari Fukuoka, Kanako Motoya and Sonoko Kato to win the Splash J and Running G tournament.

=== World Wonder Ring Stardom (2012–2018) ===
On July 26, 2015, Satomura became the World of Stardom Champion by defeating Kairi Hojo. On December 23, she lost the World of Stardom Championship to Io Shirai.

=== Chikara (2012, 2016–2017) ===
In May 2012, Satomura made her Chikara debut during the promotion's Aniversario. That same year, She returned to Chikara, participating in the group's premiere tournament, King of Trios. In 2016, Satomura, along with Cassandra Miyagi and Dash Chisako won the King of Trios tournament. The trio was announced for the 2017 edition of the tournament.

=== WWE (2018, 2020–2025) ===
==== Mae Young Classic (2018) ====
On July 27, 2018, WWE announced that Satomura will be competing in the second Mae Young Classic tournament. She defeated Killer Kelly, Mercedes Martinez, and Lacey Lane before being defeated in the semifinals by Toni Storm.

==== NXT UK (2020–2022) ====
On October 27, 2020, it was reported that Satomura had signed with WWE and would be an on-air talent and coach for NXT UK. On the January 28 episode of NXT UK, a video package aired hyping up Satomura's arrival to the brand. On the February 11 episode of NXT UK, She made her in-ring debut, where she defeated Isla Dawn in an opening match. Soon after, Satomura began a feud with NXT UK Women's Champion Kay Lee Ray, unsuccessfully challenging for the title on the March 3 episode of NXT UK; however, she won the title on the June 10 episode of NXT UK, became the first Japanese wrestler to hold the NXT UK Women's Championship, as well as in NXT UK overall. She had her first successful title defense against Amale on the July 15 episode of NXT UK. She would retain against Stevie Turner on the August 20 episode of NXT UK. She would successfully defend the championship against Blair Davenport on the January 6 episode of NXT UK and Isla Dawn on the March 24 episode of NXT UK.

==== NXT (2022–2023) ====
On the August 23, 2022, episode of NXT 2.0, Satomura made her first appearance on NXT, an American promotion, where she confronted the NXT Women's Champion Mandy Rose. The two agreed to an unification match for their titles at Worlds Collide, with Blair Davenport being added to the match. At the event, Rose won the match by pinning Davenport, ending Satomura's reign as NXT UK Women's Champion at 451 days (as recognized by WWE). On the February 14 episode of NXT, she made her return, teaming with the NXT Women's Champion Roxanne Perez defeating Katana Chance and Kayden Carter. After the match, Satomura challenged Perez to a championship match, which Perez accepted. The following week, the match was made official for NXT Roadblock, where Satomura would lose via roll-up. Satomura then congratulated Perez after the match, only for her (Perez) to collapse afterwards. This would be Satomura's last televised match in WWE before her retirement in 2025. She wrestled her final match with the company against Bayley for the WWE Women's Championship on July 27, 2024 which the WWE later uploaded on their official YouTube channel.

=== Retirement (2025) ===
On July 27, 2024, Satomura announced in a press conference that she would have her last match in the Spring, coinciding with her 30-year anniversary as an in-ring competitor. In November, it was announced that she would have her retirement bout on April 29. In February 2025, Satomura competed in her final bout in Europe, teaming with Rayne Leverkusen to defeat Nina Samuels and Millie McKenzie at Final Sting, an event jointly promoted by Sendai Girls' Pro Wrestling, ICHIBAN (UK), Progress Wrestling and HUSTLE Wrestling. At the April 29 event, which was entitled Satomura Meiko The Final, Satomura wrestled her scheduled final match, teaming with apprentice Manami to defeat Aja Kong and Chihiro Hashimoto. Immediately after the bout, an impromptu match took place, where Satomura teamed with Kong against Hashimoto, Mika Iwata, Senka Akatsuki, Takumi Iroha, and Yuna in a two-on-five handicap match, which finished in a five-minute time limit draw.

=== Post-retirement (2025–present) ===
Following her retirement, Satomura remained the representative director of Sendai Girls', which on January 30, 2026, the promotion joined United Japan Pro-Wrestling (UJPW). On February 17, Satomura became the first woman to be appointed as a director of UJPW.

== Other media ==
Satomura appeared in the 2000 documentary Gaea Girls made for the BBC by Kim Longinotto and Jano Williams. Satomura also attempted the Sponge Bridge course on Kinniku Banzuke.

== Championships and accomplishments ==
- Chikara
  - King of Trios (2016) – with Cassandra Miyagi and Dash Chisako
- DDT Pro-Wrestling
  - KO-D Openweight Championship (1 time)
  - KO-D 6-Man Tag Team Championship (1 time) – with Chihiro Hashimoto and Dash Chisako
- Fight Club: PRO
  - FCP Championship (1 time)
- Gaea Japan
  - AAAW Single Championship (2 times)
  - AAAW Junior Heavyweight Tag Team Championship / AAAW Tag Team Championship (3 times) – with Sonoko Kato (1), Ayako Hamada (1) and Chikayo Nagashima (1)
  - Hustling Cup (1996)
  - High Spurt 600 (1998, 2001)
  - Splash J and Running G (1995) – with Kaoru and Tomoko Kuzumi
- Progress Wrestling
  - Progress World Women's Championship (1 time)
- Pro Wrestling Illustrated
  - Ranked No. 22 of the top 150 female wrestlers in the PWI Women's 150 in 2022
- Sendai Girls' Pro Wrestling
  - Sendai Girls World Championship (2 times, inaugural)
  - Joshi Puroresu Dantai Taikou Flash Tournament (2011) – with Dash Chisako, Hiren, Kagetsu, Miyako Morino, Ryo Mizunami and Sendai Sachiko
- Tokyo Sports
  - Joshi Puroresu Grand Prize (2013)
- Westside Xtreme Wrestling
  - Femmes Fatales Tournament (2018)
- World Wonder Ring Stardom
  - World of Stardom Championship (1 time)
  - Stardom Year-End Award (1 time)
    - Best Match Award (2015) vs. Io Shirai on December 23
- WWE
  - NXT UK Women's Championship (1 time, final)
