= Sendai Girls World Championship =

Women's professional wrestling championship

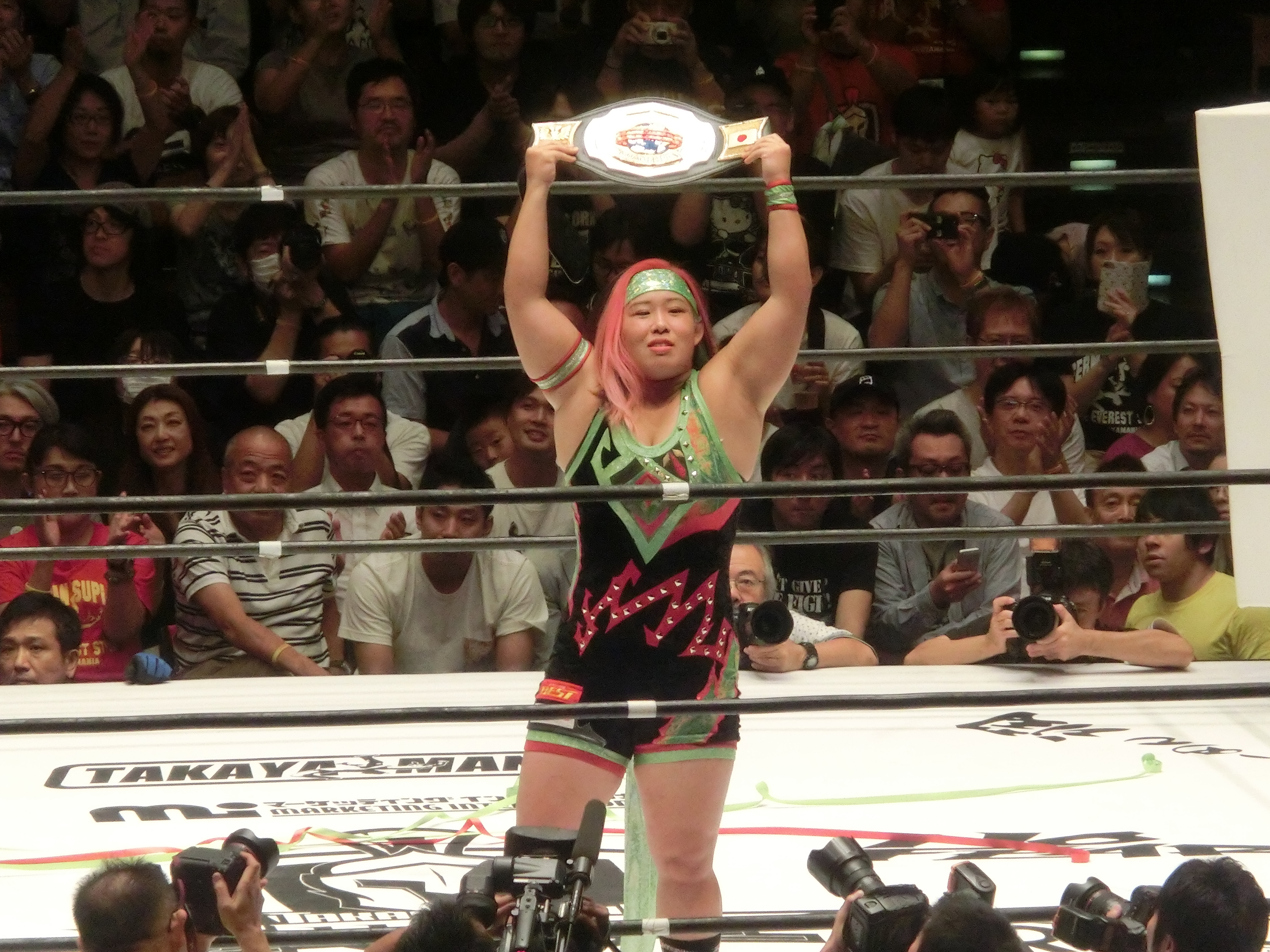
- Chihiro Hashimoto with the current belt design in August 2018

Details
- Promotion: Sendai Girls' Pro Wrestling
- Date established: September 17, 2011
- Current champion: Chihiro Hashimoto
- Date won: March 19, 2025
Statistics
- First champion: Meiko Satomura
- Most reigns: Chihiro Hashimoto (6 reigns)
- Longest reign: Chihiro Hashimoto (10th reign, 1,148 days)
- Shortest reign: Dash Chisako (21 days)
- Oldest champion: Aja Kong (46 years, 115 days)
- Youngest champion: Millie McKenzie (23 years, 29 days)
- Heaviest champion: Aja Kong (227 lb (103 kg))
- Lightest champion: Millie McKenzie (128 lb (58 kg))

The Sendai Girls World Championship (Japanese: センダイガールズワールドシングルチャンピオンシップ, Hepburn: Sendai Gāruzu Wārudo Shinguru Chanpionshippu) is a women's professional wrestling championship owned by the Sendai Girls' Pro Wrestling. The title, which is situated at the top of Sendai's championship hierarchy, was introduced on September 17, 2011, and the inaugural champion was crowned on October 11, 2015, when Meiko Satomura defeated Ayako Hamada.

== History ==
On September 17, 2015, Sendai Girls' announced the establishment of the Sendai Girls World Championship. On October 11, Meiko Satomura, the founder of Sendai Girls', became the inaugural champion after defeating Ayako Hamada. Satomura held the title for 371 days before losing it on October 16, 2016, to her former trainee, Chihiro Hashimoto. Hashimoto would later proceed to set a record of five reigns.

On May 13, 2018, The seventh champion Ayako Hamada was stripped from the title due to a drug related arrest. On June 24, Hashimoto won the vacant title by defeating Dash Chisako.

== Reigns ==
As of November 22, 2026, there have been a total of eighteenth reigns shared between eleven different champions and one vacancy. Meiko Satomura was the inaugural champion. Chihiro Hashimoto holds the record for most reigns at six. Hashimoto's fifth reign is the longest at 1,148 days, while Dash Chisako's reign is the shortest at 21 days. Aja Kong is the oldest champion at 46 years old, while Millie McKenzie is the youngest at 23 years old.

Chihiro Hashimoto is the current champion in her sixth reign. She won the title by defeating Meiko Satomura on March 19, 2025, in Tokyo, Japan.

Key
No.	Overall reign number
Reign	Reign number for the specific champion
Days	Number of days held
Defenses	Number of successful defenses
+	Current reign is changing daily

No.	Champion	Championship change			Reign statistics			Notes	Ref.
No.	Champion	Date	Event	Location	Reign	Days	Defenses	Notes	Ref.
1	Meiko Satomura	October 11, 2015	Joshi Puroresu Big Show in Sendai ~ Meiko Satomura 20th Anniversary Show	Sendai, Miyagi, Japan	1	371	3	Satomura defeated Ayako Hamada to become the inaugural champion.	
2	Chihiro Hashimoto	October 16, 2016	Sendai Girls 10th Anniversary Show ~ Women's Wrestling Big Show in Sendai 2016	Sendai, Miyagi, Japan	1	85	1		
3	Aja Kong	January 9, 2017	Sendai Girls	Tokyo, Japan	1	87	0		
4	Chihiro Hashimoto	April 6, 2017	Sendai Girls	Tokyo, Japan	2	65	0		
5	Hiroyo Matsumoto	June 10, 2017	Sendai Girls	Sapporo, Hokkaido, Japan	1	35	0		
6	Chihiro Hashimoto	July 15, 2017	Sendai Girls Women's Wrestling Big Show in Niigata 2017	Niigata, Japan	3	278	2		
7	Ayako Hamada	April 19, 2018	Sendai Girls	Tokyo, Japan	1	24	0		
—	Vacated	May 13, 2018	—	—	—	—	—	Ayako Hamada vacated the championship due to a drug related arrest.	
8	Chihiro Hashimoto	June 24, 2018	Michinoku Pro Jinsei Shinzaki 25th Anniversary Show	Sendai, Miyagi, Japan	4	349	5	Hashimoto defeated Dash Chisako to win the vacant championship.	
9	Sareee	June 8, 2019	Sendai Girls Women's Pro Wrestling Big Show in Niigata	Niigata, Japan	1	127	1	This was a title vs. title match in which Sareee also defended the World Woman Pro-Wrestling Diana World Championship.	
10	Chihiro Hashimoto	October 13, 2019	Sendai Girls Joshi Puroresu Big Show in Sendai	Sendai, Miyagi, Japan	5	1,148	5	At GAEAism Decade of a Quarter Century on June 13, Hashimoto defended the world title and the tag team titles by teaming up with Dash Chisako and Mika Iwata in a three-way winner-takes-all match also involving Mei Hoshizuki, Mio Momono and Rin Kadokura, where the vacant AAAW Championship and the AAAW Tag Team Championship were also on the line.	
11	Asuka	December 4, 2022	Sendai Girls Big Show in Osaka	Osaka, Japan	1	224	2		
12	Millie McKenzie	July 16, 2023	Sendai Girls	Tokyo, Japan	1	64	0		
13	Mika Iwata	September 18, 2023	Sendai Girls Big Show In Sendai	Sendai, Japan	1	301	1		
14	Saori Anou	July 15, 2024	Sendai Girls	Sendai, Japan	1	60	1	This was a winner takes all match in which Iwata's Wonder of Stardom Championship was also on the line.	
15	Mika Iwata	September 13, 2024	Sendai Girls	Sendai, Japan	2	65	2		
16	Dash Chisako	November 17, 2024	Sendai Girls	Tokyo, Japan	1	21	0		
17	Meiko Satomura	December 8, 2024	Sendai Girls Big Show In Sendai	Sendai, Japan	2	101	0		
18	Chihiro Hashimoto	March 19, 2025	Sendai Girls The Top Of Joshi Wrestling	Tokyo, Japan	6	613+	10		

== Combined reigns ==
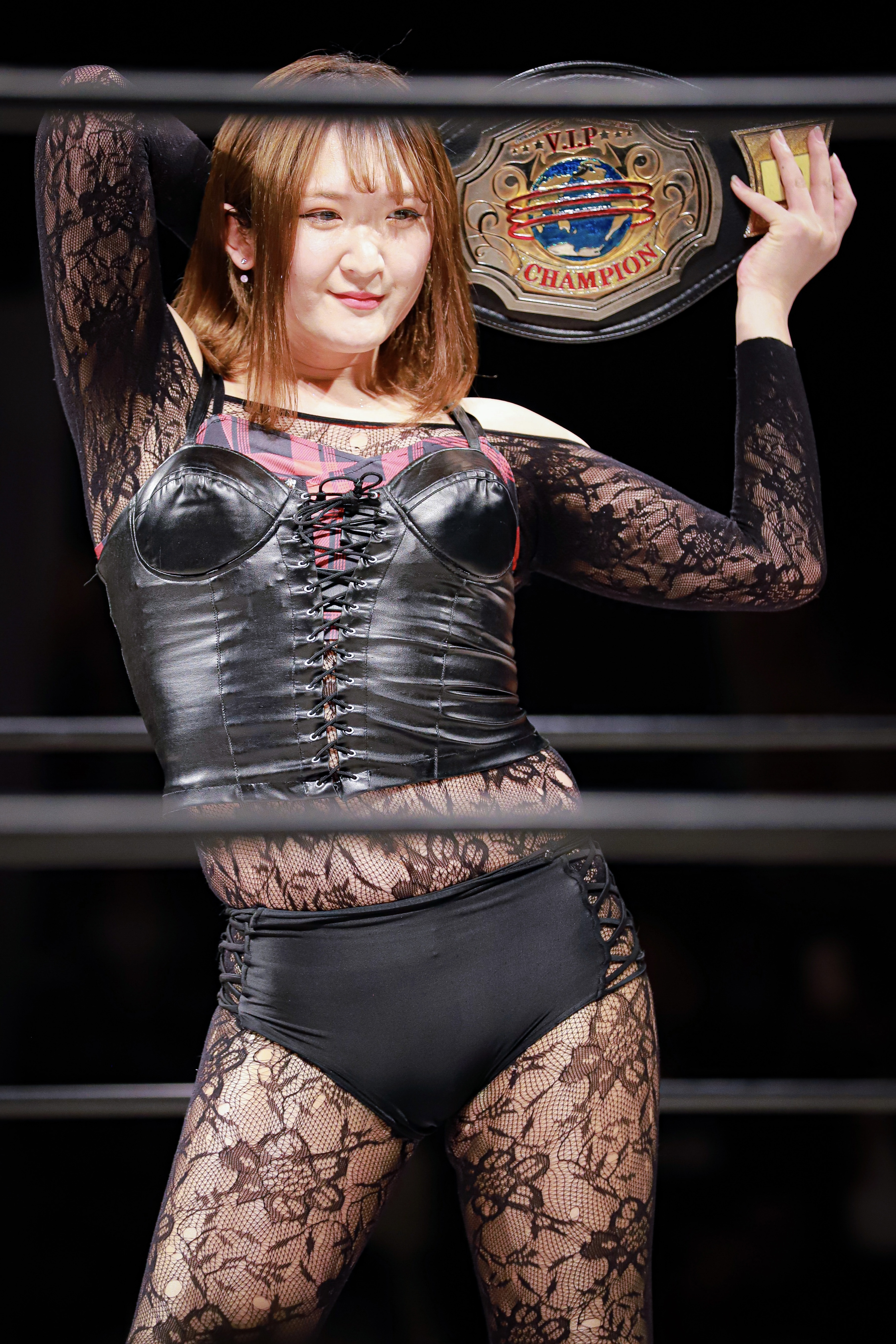
Former champion Asuka

As of November 22, 2026.

†	Indicates the current champion

Rank	Wrestler	No. of reigns	Combined defenses	Combined days
1	Chihiro Hashimoto †	6	23	2,538+
2	Meiko Satomura	2	3	472
3	Mika Iwata	2	3	364
4	Asuka	1	2	224
5	Sareee	1	1	127
6	Aja Kong	1	0	87
7	Millie McKenzie	1	0	64
8	Saori Anou	1	1	60
9	Hiroyo Matsumoto	1	0	35
10	Ayako Hamada	1	0	24
11	Dash Chisako	1	0	21
