= Sendai Girls Tag Team Championship =

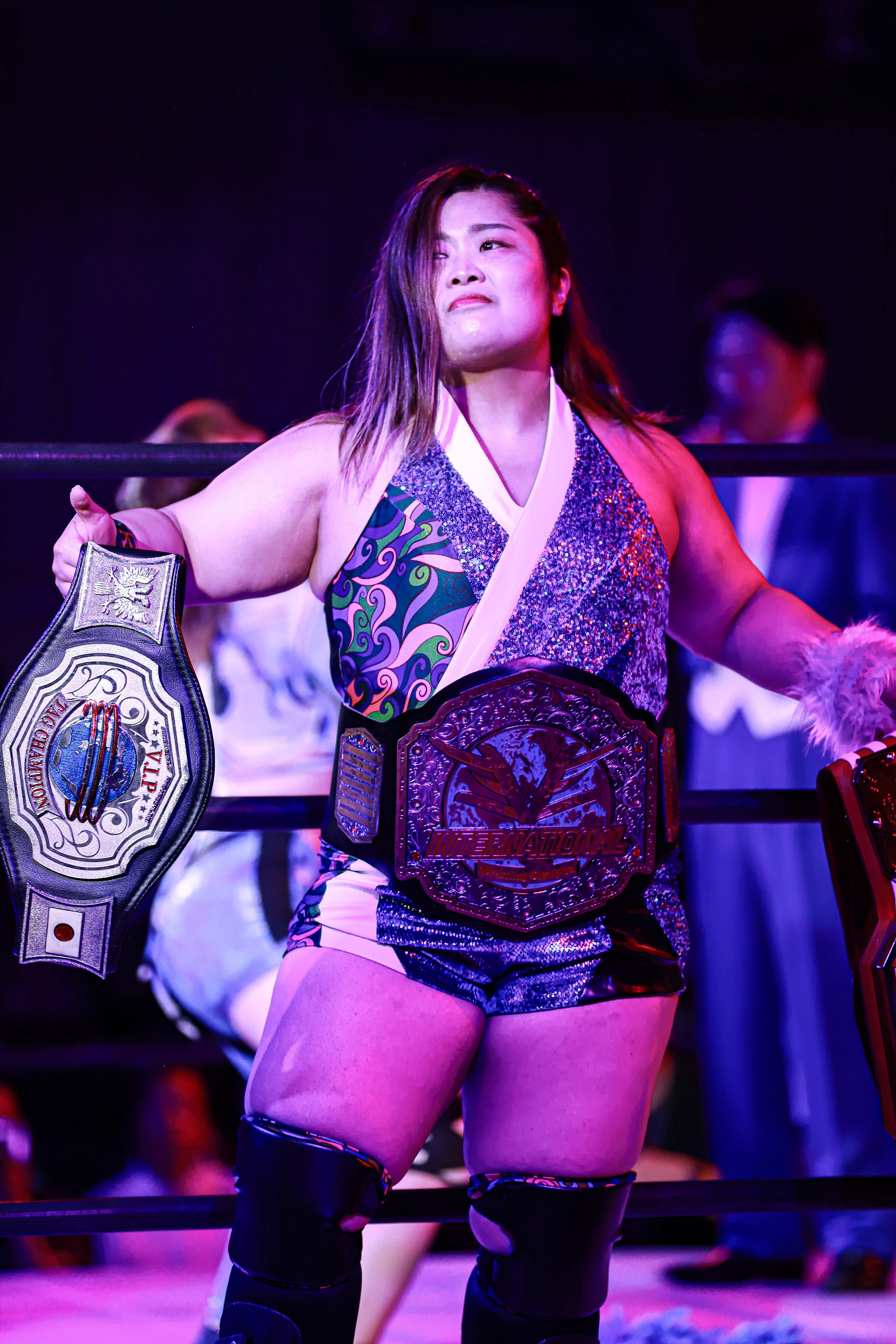
- Yuu holding one of the titles in her right hand

Details
- Promotion: Sendai Girls' Pro Wrestling
- Date established: September 17, 2011
- Current champions: Red Energy (Mika Iwata and Miyuki Takase)
- Date won: June 13, 2026
Statistics
- First champions: Dash Chisako and Sendai Sachiko
- Most reigns: As a team (5 reigns): Team 200kg (Chihiro Hashimoto and Yuu); As individual (7 reigns): Dash Chisako
- Longest reign: Hikaru Shida and Syuri (234 days)
- Shortest reign: Cassandra Miyagi and Dash Chisako (6 days)
- Oldest champion: Kaoru (47 years, 287 days)
- Youngest champion: Manami (17 years, 41 days)
- Heaviest champion: Chihiro Hashimoto and Yuu (411 lbs combined)
- Lightest champion: Hikaru Shida and Syuri (246 lbs combined)

The Sendai Girls Tag Team Championship is a professional wrestling world tag team championship owned by the Sendai Girls' Pro Wrestling. The title was introduced on September 17, 2011, and the inaugural champions were crowned on October 11, 2015, when the Jumboni Sisters (Dash Chisako and Sendai Sachiko) defeated Kyoko Kimura and Takumi Iroha.

Like most professional wrestling championships, the title is won as a result of a scripted match. There have been a total of twenty-seven reigns shared among sixteen teams consisting of twenty-two distinctive wrestlers and three vacancies. The current champions are Red Energy (Mika Iwata and Miyuki Takase) who are in their second reign as a team.

== Reigns ==
As of September 15, 2026, there have been a total of 27 reigns shared between 16 teams composed of 22 individual champions and three vacancies. The Jumboni Sisters (Dash Chisako and Sendai Sachiko) were the inaugural champions. Team 200 kg (Chihiro Hashimoto and Yuu) holds the record for most reigns at a team at three, while individually, Chisako has the most reigns at six. Reiwa Ultima Powers (Chisako and Hiroyo Matsumoto)'s reign is the longest at 357 days, while Cassandra Miyagi and Chisako's reign is the shortest at 6 days. Kaoru is the oldest champion at 47 years old, while Manami is the youngest at 17 years old.

Key
| No. | Overall reign number |
| Reign | Reign number for the specific team—reign numbers for the individuals are in parentheses, if different |
| Days | Number of days held |
| Defenses | Number of successful defenses |
| + | Current reign is changing daily |

| No. | Champion | Championship change | | | Reign statistics | | | Notes | Ref. |
| No. | Champion | Date | Event | Location | Reign | Days | Defenses | Notes | Ref. |
|---|---|---|---|---|---|---|---|---|---|
| 1 | Jumboni Sisters (Dash Chisako and Sendai Sachiko) | October 11, 2015 | Joshi Puroresu Big Show in Sendai ~ Meiko Satomura 20th Anniversary Show | Sendai, Miyagi, Japan | 1 | 98 | 1 | Defeated Kyoko Kimura and Takumi Iroha to become the inaugural champions. | |
| — | Vacated | January 17, 2016 | Sendai Girls Sendai Sachiko Retirement Final | Sendai, Miyagi, Japan | — | — | — | Dash Chisako and Sendai Sachiko relinquished their championship, as Sachiko decided to retire from professional wrestling. | |
| 2 | Dash Chisako and Kaoru | October 16, 2016 | Sendai Girls 10th Anniversary Show ~ Joshi Puroresu Big Show 2016 In Sendai | Sendai, Miyagi, Japan | 1 (2, 1) | 38 | 0 | Defeated Hikaru Shida and Syuri to win the vacant championship. | |
| 3 | Hikaru Shida and Syuri | November 23, 2016 | Senjo Night in Hakata | Fukuoka, Japan | 1 | 234 | 3 | | |
| 4 | Cassandra Miyagi and Dash Chisako | July 15, 2017 | Joshi Puroresu Big Show 2017 in Niigata | Niigata, Japan | 1 (1, 3) | 6 | 0 | | |
| — | Vacated | July 21, 2017 | Sendai Girls | Sendai, Miyagi, Japan | — | — | — | Cassandra Miyagi announced that she lost interest in the championship, therefore, the championship was vacated. | |
| 5 | Riot Crown (Dash Chisako and Kaoru) | September 24, 2017 | Joshi Puroresu Big Show 2017 in Sendai | Sendai, Miyagi, Japan | 2 (4, 2) | 168 | 2 | Defeated Strong Style Rush (Alex Lee and Mika Shirahime) to win the vacant championship. | |
| 6 | Cassandra Miyagi and Heidi Katrina | March 11, 2018 | Sendai Girls | Tokyo, Japan | 1 (2, 1) | 188 | 3 | | |
| 7 | Beauty Bear (Chihiro Hashimoto and Mika Iwata) | September 15, 2018 | Sendai Girls | Osaka, Japan | 1 | 254 | 0 | | |
| 8 | Medusa Complex (Charli Evans and Millie McKenzie) | May 27, 2019 | Sendai Girls | Sendai, Miyagi, Japan | 1 | 139 | 2 | | |
| 9 | Reiwa Ultima Powers (Dash Chisako and Hiroyo Matsumoto) | October 13, 2019 | Sendai Girls | Sendai, Miyagi, Japan | 1 (5, 1) | 357 | 1 | | |
| 10 | Team 200kg (Chihiro Hashimoto and Yuu) | October 4, 2020 | Keep Burning | Tokyo, Japan | 1 (2, 1) | 266 | 0 | At GAEAism Decade of a Quarter Century on June 13, Hashimoto defended the Sendai Girls World Championship and the tag team titles by teaming up with Dash Chisako and Mika Iwata in a three-way winner-takes-all match also involving Mei Hoshizuki, Mio Momono and Rin Kadokura, where the vacant AAAW Championship and AAAW Tag Team Championship were also on the line. | |
| 11 | Mio Momono and Rin Kadokura | June 27, 2021 | Big Show 2021 In Niigata | Niigata, Japan | 1 | 85 | 0 | | |
| 12 | Manami and Mika Iwata | September 20, 2021 | Sendai Girls Burning UP | Sendai, Japan | 1 (1, 2) | 31 | 0 | | |
| 13 | Andras Miyagi and Hibiki | October 21, 2021 | Sendai Girls Keep Burning 2021 | Sendai, Japan | 1 (3, 1) | 33 | 0 | Miyagi was previously known as Cassandra Miyagi. | |
| 14 | Team 200kg (Chihiro Hashimoto and Yuu) | November 23, 2021 | Sendai Girls | Sendai, Japan | 2 (3, 2) | 321 | 3 | | |
| 15 | Reiwa Ultima Powers (Dash Chisako and Hiroyo Matsumoto) | October 10, 2022 | Sendai Girls Keep Burning! | Tokyo, Japan | 2 (6, 2) | 74 | 1 | | |
| — | Vacated | December 23, 2022 | – | – | — | — | — | The championship was vacated due to undocumented reasons. | |
| 16 | Team 200kg (Chihiro Hashimoto and Yuu) | February 12, 2023 | Sendai Girls | Nagaoka, Japan | 3 (4, 3) | 373 | 6 | Defeated Manami and Ryo Mizunami to win the vacant titles. | |
| 17 | Reiwa Ultima Powers (Dash Chisako and Hiroyo Matsumoto) | February 20, 2024 | Sendai Girls | Sendai, Japan | 3 (7, 3) | 26 | 0 | | |
| 18 | Manami and Ryo Mizunami | March 17, 2024 | Sendai Girls | Tokyo, Japan | 1 (2, 1) | 120 | 2 | | |
| 19 | Bob Bob Momo Banana (Mio Momono and Yurika Oka) | July 15, 2024 | Sendai Girls | Tokyo, Japan | 1 (2, 1) | 74 | 0 | | |
| 20 | Team 200kg (Chihiro Hashimoto and Yuu) | September 27, 2024 | Sendai Girls | Tokyo, Japan | 4 (5, 4) | 43 | 1 | | |
| 21 | Lena Kross and Veny | November 9, 2024 | Sendai Girls Big Show In Niigata | Niigata, Japan | 1 (1, 1) | 29 | 1 | | |
| 22 | Bob Bob Momo Banana (Mio Momono and Yurika Oka) | December 8, 2024 | Sendai Girls Big Show In Sendai | Sendai, Japan | 2 (3, 2) | 63 | 1 | | |
| 23 | Red Energy (Mika Iwata and Miyuki Takase) | January 9, 2025 | Sendai Girls | Sendai, Japan | 1 (3, 1) | 160 | 2 | | |
| 24 | Team 200kg (Chihiro Hashimoto and Yuu) | July 19, 2025 | Sendai Girls | Tokyo, Japan | 5 (6, 5) | 160 | 4 | | |
| 25 | Bob Bob Momo Banana (Mio Momono and Yurika Oka) | December 26, 2025 | Sendai Girls | Sendai, Japan | 3 (4, 3) | 107 | 1 | | |
| 26 | Manami and Ryo Mizunami | April 12, 2026 | Sendai Girls | Tokyo, Japan | 2 (3, 2) | 91 | 1 | | |
| 27 | Red Energy (Mika Iwata and Miyuki Takase) | June 13, 2026 | Sendai Girls SENJO 20th Anniversary Tour In Sendai PIT ~ The Sky Is The Limit ~ | Sendai, Japan | 2 (4, 2) | 94+ | 1 | | |

== Combined reigns ==
As of September 15, 2026.

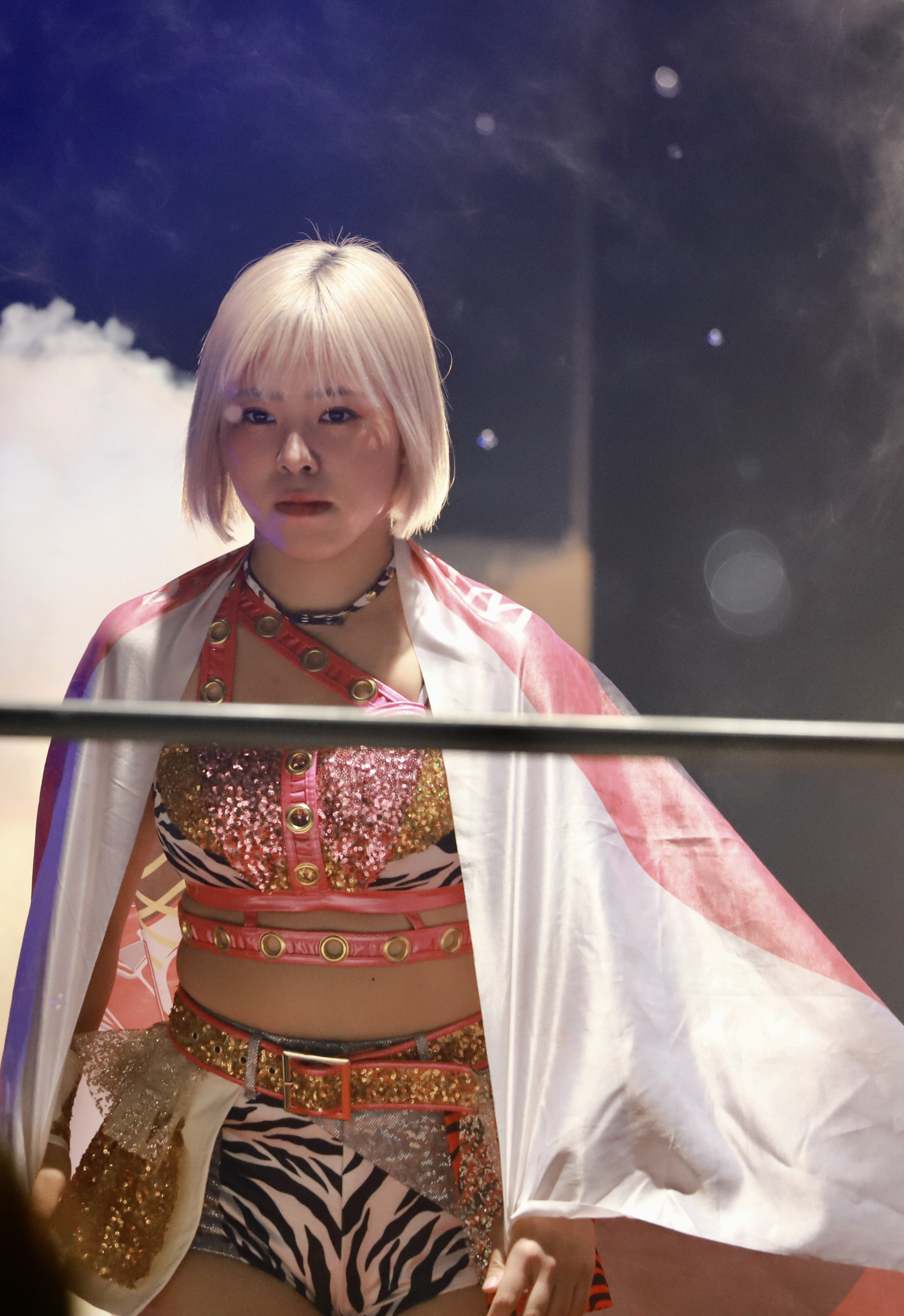
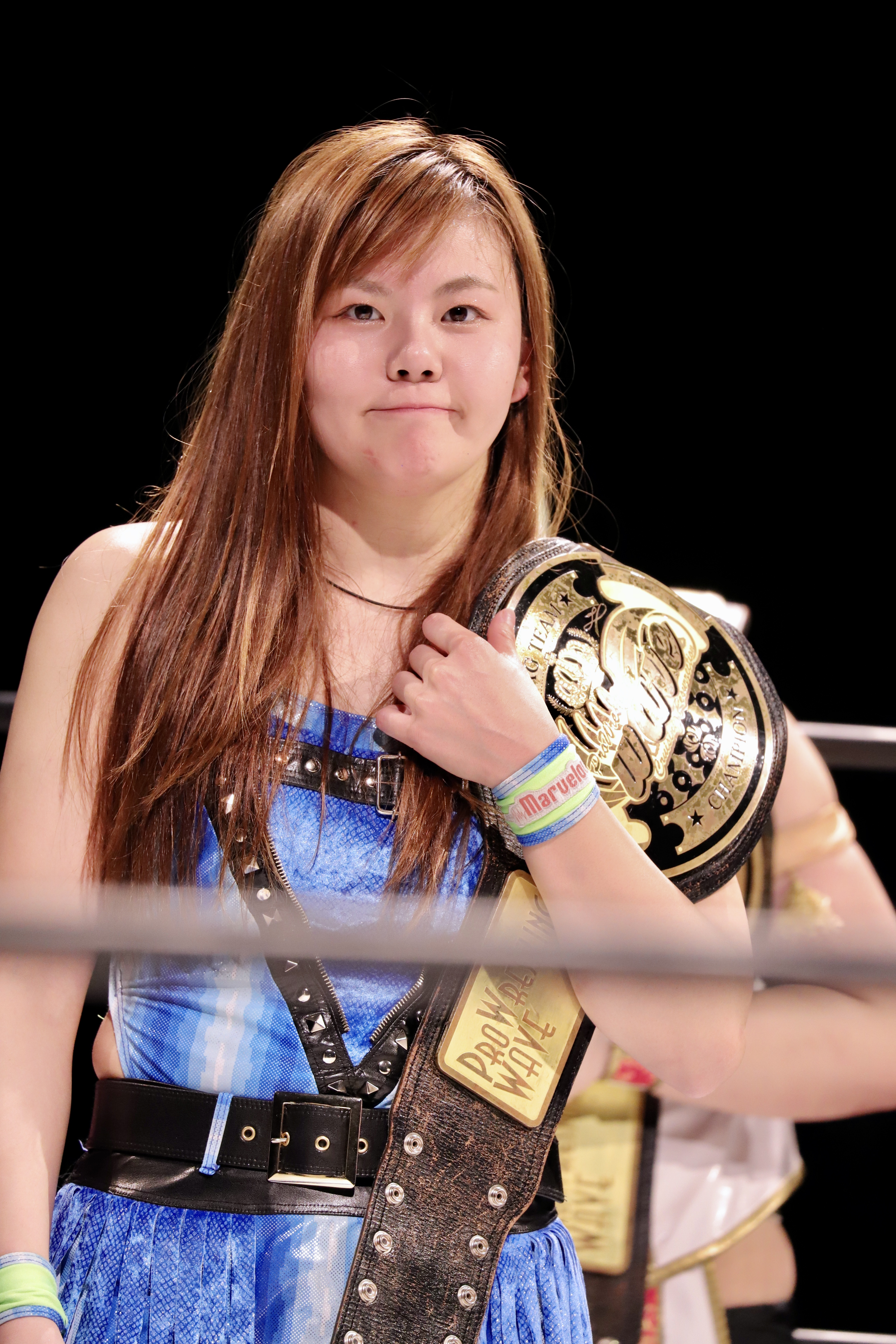
Former champions Mio Momono (left) and Rin Kadokura (right)

=== By team ===
| † | Indicates the current champion |

| Rank | Team | No. of reigns | Combined defenses | Combined days |
|---|---|---|---|---|
| 1 | Team 200kg (Chihiro Hashimoto and Yuu) | 5 | 14 | 1,163 |
| 2 | Reiwa Ultima Powers (Dash Chisako and Hiroyo Matsumoto) | 3 | 2 | 457 |
| 3 | Red Energy † (Mika Iwata and Miyuki Takase) | 2 | 3 | 254+ |
| 4 | Beauty Bear (Chihiro Hashimoto and Mika Iwata) | 1 | 0 | 254 |
| 5 | Bob Bob Momo Banana (Mio Momono and Yurika Oka) | 3 | 2 | 244 |
| 6 | Hikaru Shida and Syuri | 1 | 3 | 234 |
| 7 | Cassandra Miyagi and Heidi Katrina | 1 | 3 | 188 |
| 8 | Manami and Ryo Mizunami | 2 | 3 | 182 |
| 9 | Riot Crown (Dash Chisako and Kaoru) | 2 | 2 | 168 |
| 10 | Medusa Complex (Charli Evans and Millie McKenzie) | 1 | 2 | 139 |
| 11 | Jumboni Sisters (Dash Chisako and Sendai Sachiko) | 1 | 1 | 98 |
| 12 | Mio Momono and Rin Kadokura | 1 | 0 | 85 |
| 13 | Andras Miyagi and Hibiki | 1 | 0 | 33 |
| 14 | Manami and Mika Iwata | 1 | 0 | 31 |
| 15 | Lena Kross and Veny | 1 | 1 | 29 |
| 16 | Cassandra Miyagi and Dash Chisako | 1 | 0 | 6 |

=== By wrestler ===
| Rank | Wrestler | No. of reigns | Combined defenses | Combined days |
|---|---|---|---|---|
| 1 | Chihiro Hashimoto | 6 | 14 | 1,417 |
| 2 | Yuu | 5 | 14 | 1,163 |
| 3 | Dash Chisako | 7 | 5 | 767 |
| 4 | Mika Iwata † | 4 | 3 | 539+ |
| 5 | Hiroyo Matsumoto | 3 | 2 | 457 |
| 6 | Mio Momono | 4 | 2 | 329 |
| 7 | Miyuki Takase † | 2 | 3 | 254+ |
| 8 | Yurika Oka | 3 | 2 | 244 |
| 9 | Manami | 3 | 3 | 242 |
| 10 | Hikaru Shida | 1 | 3 | 234 |
| 10 | Syuri | 1 | 3 | 234 |
| 12 | Cassandra Miyagi/Michiko Miyagi | 3 | 3 | 227 |
| 13 | Kaoru | 2 | 2 | 206 |
| 14 | Heidi Katrina | 1 | 3 | 188 |
| 15 | Ryo Mizunami | 2 | 3 | 182 |
| 16 | Charli Evans | 1 | 2 | 139 |
| 16 | Millie McKenzie | 1 | 2 | 139 |
| 18 | Sendai Sachiko | 1 | 1 | 98 |
| 19 | Rin Kadokura | 1 | 0 | 85 |
| 20 | Hibiki | 1 | 0 | 33 |
| 21 | Lena Kross | 1 | 1 | 29 |
| 21 | Veny | 1 | 1 | 29 |
