= Mika Iwata =

Japanese professional wrestler

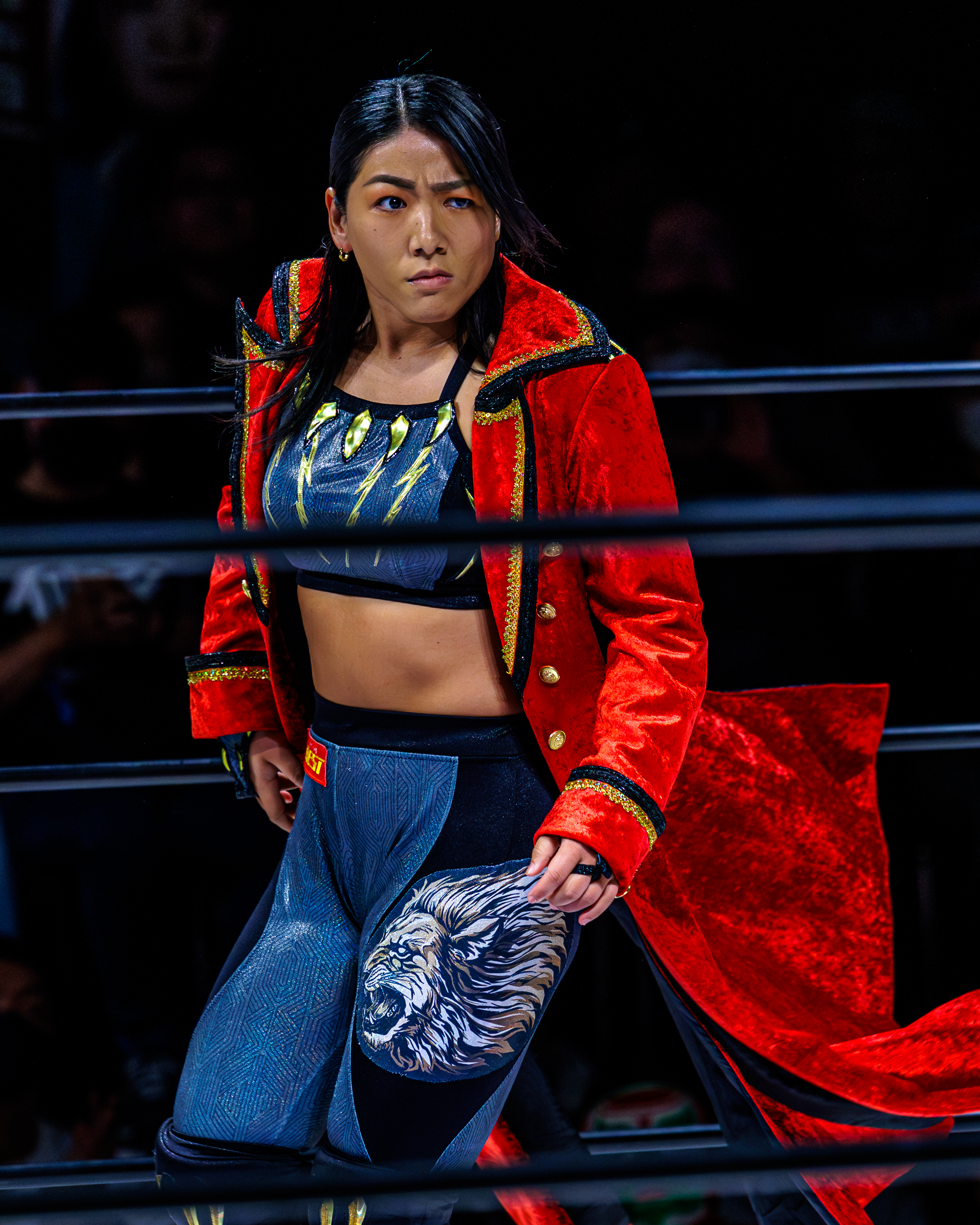
- Iwata in May 2026

Personal information
- Born: June 10, 1996 (age 30) Onga,Fukuoka, Japan

Professional wrestling career
- Ring name(s): Mika Shirahime; Mika Iwata
- Billed height: 160 cm (5 ft 3 in)
- Billed weight: 63 kg (139 lb)
- Trained by: Meiko Satomura
- Debut: 2015

Mika Iwata (岩田美香, Iwata Mika) is a Japanese professional wrestler currently working as a freelancer and is best known for her tenure with the Japanese promotions Sendai Girls' Pro Wrestling and Pro Wrestling Wave.

== Professional wrestling career ==
=== Independent circuit (2015-present) ===
As a freelancer, Iwata is known for competing in multiple promotions of the Japanese independent scene. At Seadlinnng Let's Go Now on May 18, 2016, she teamed up with Yuki Miyazaki in a losing effort against Yumiko Hotta and Cassandra Miyagi. At Pure-J Climax on December 17, 2017, she teamed up with Alex Lee as "Strong Style Rush" in a losing effort against Kazuki and Rydeen Hagane. At Oz Academy The Wizard Of OZ 2018 - Day 1 on January 7, Iwata teamed up with Meiko Satomura to defeat Aoi Kizuki and Tsubasa Kuragaki. At TJPW The Sparkling Girl Will Fly To Hakata, an event promoted by Tokyo Joshi Pro Wrestling on March 31, 2019, she teamed up with Hikari Noa in a losing effort against Aja Kong and Shoko Nakajima. At the Hana Kimura Memorial Show, an independent event produced by Kyoko Kimura to commemorate one year since the death of her daughter Hana Kimura on May 23, 2021, Iwata competed in a 28-person All-Star Battle Royal won by Ram Kaicho and also involving notable opponents such as Super Delfin, Cima, Masato Tanaka Banana Senga, Gabai Jichan, Lingerie Mutoh, Jun Kasai, Jinsei Shinzaki and many others.

Iwata often wrestled in men's promotions as joshi talent. At Wrestle-1's Tour 2018 W-Impact on February 14, 2018, she teamed up with Natsumi Maki in a losing effort against Hana Kimura and Saori Anou. At Jinsei Shinzaki 25th Anniversary Show, an event produced by Michinoku Pro Wrestling on June 24, 2018, Iwata teamed up with Manami and Meiko Satomura in a losing effort against Ami Sato, Cassandra Miyagi and Heidi Katrina. At a house show promoted by Big Japan Pro Wrestling on September 22, 2018, Iwata fell short to Cassandra Miyagi. At K-DOJO K-Up Impact In Blue Field ~ 2018 Winter, an event promoted by Kaientai Dojo on December 24, 2018, she teamed up with Chihiro Hashimoto as Beauty Bear to defeat Ayame Sasamura and Rina Shingaki.

=== Sendai Girls' Pro Wrestling (2015-present) ===
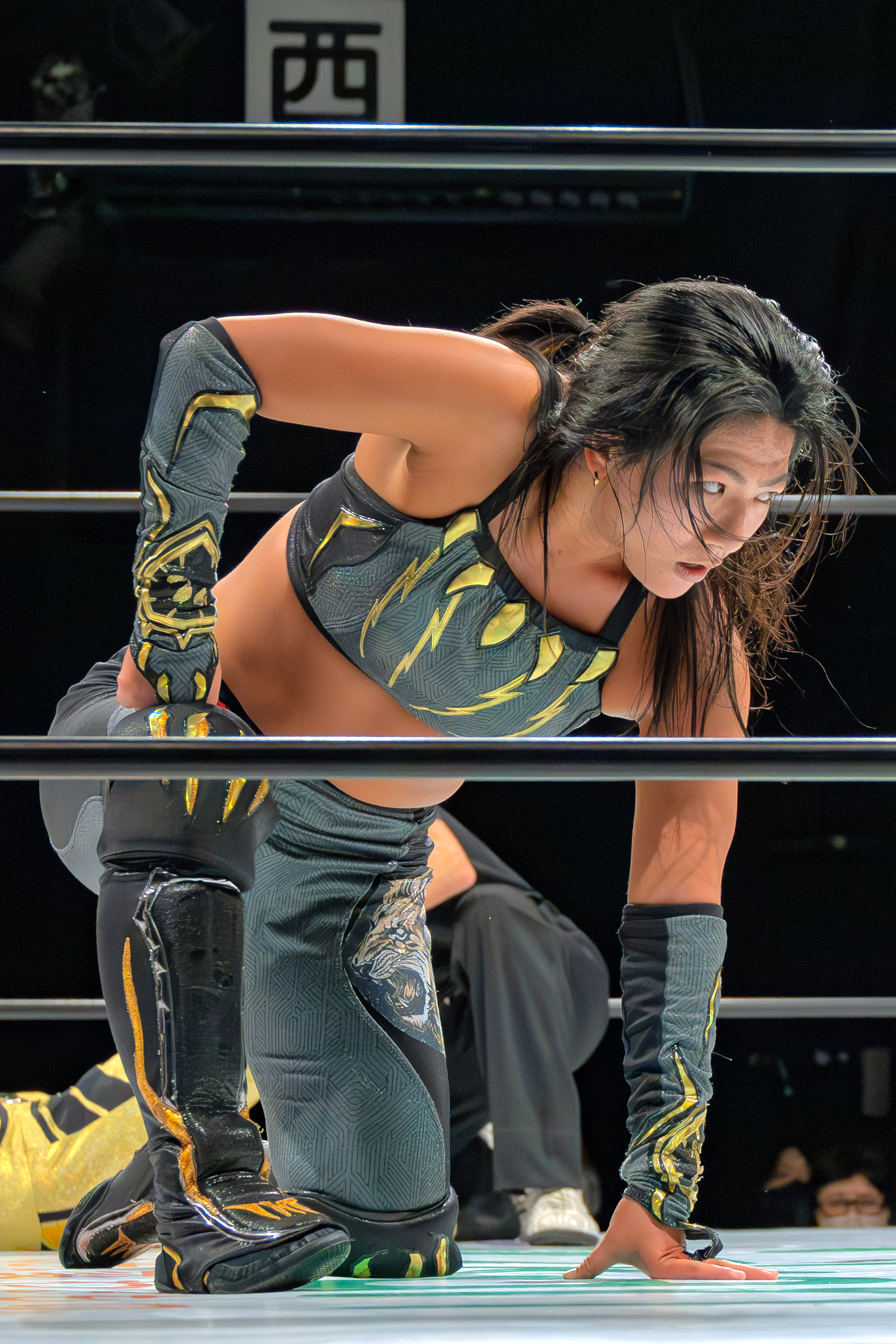
Iwata in December 2025

Iwata made her professional wrestling debut in Sendai Girls' Pro Wrestling, at Big Show In Niigata ~ Meiko Satomura 20th Anniversary Show on July 12, 2015, under the name of Mika Shirahime, where she fell short to Aja Kong. At Sendai Girls/Stardom Sendai Girls Vs. Stardom, an event produced in partnership with World Wonder Ring Stardom on November 12, 2015, Iwata teamed up with Cassandra Miyagi, Chihiro Hashimoto, Dash Chisako, Meiko Satomura and Sendai Sachiko as "Team Sendai Girls" in a losing effort against "Team Stardom" (Hiromi Mimura, Io Shirai, Kairi Hojo, Kris Wolf, Mayu Iwatani and Momo Watanabe) as a result of a 12-woman gauntlet tag team match. On June 13, 2021, at GAEAism Decade Of Quarter Century event, Hashimoto defended the Sendai Girls World Championship and the tag team titles by teaming up with Dash Chisako and Iwata in a three-way winner-takes-all match also involving Mei Hoshizuki, Mio Momono and Rin Kadokura, where the vacant AAAW Championship and the AAAW Tag Team Championship were also on the line. At JWP/Sendai Girls JWP Vs. Sendai Girls, an event produced in partnership with JWP Joshi Puroresu on March 26, 2017, Iwata teamed up with Chihiro Hashimoto and Dash Chisako in a losing effort against Hanako Nakamori, Leon and Manami Katsu in a six-man tag team match.

=== Pro Wrestling Wave (2017-2019) ===
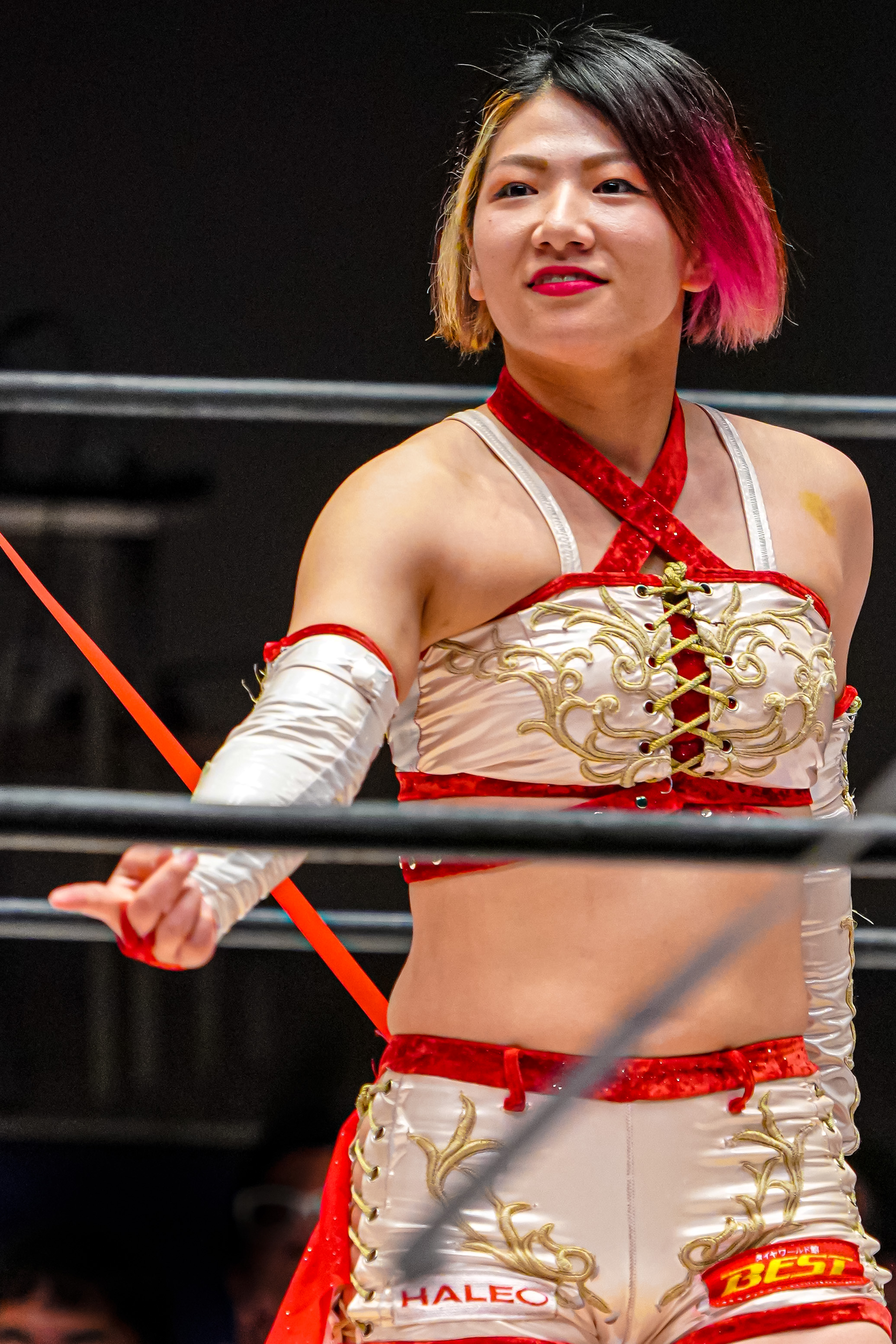
Iwata in May 2019

Iwata ia also known for her brief tenure with Pro Wrestling Wave. She competed in the promotion's signature events such as the Catch the Wave tournament, making her first appearance at the 2019 edition, placing herself in the "Technical Block" and scoring a total of two points after only going against Sakura Hirota before suffering a legitimate injury which made her ineligible to furtherly compete against Takumi Iroha and Rin Kadokura.

== Championships and accomplishments ==
- Pro Wrestling Illustrated
  - Ranked No. 38 of the top 250 female wrestlers in the PWI Women's 250 in 2024
- Sendai Girls' Pro Wrestling
  - Sendai Girls World Championship (2 times)
  - Sendai Girls Tag Team Championship (3 times) – with Chihiro Hashimoto (1), Manami (1) and Miyuki Takase (1)
- World Wonder Ring Stardom
  - Wonder of Stardom Championship (1 time)
