= Veny =

Japanese professional wrestler

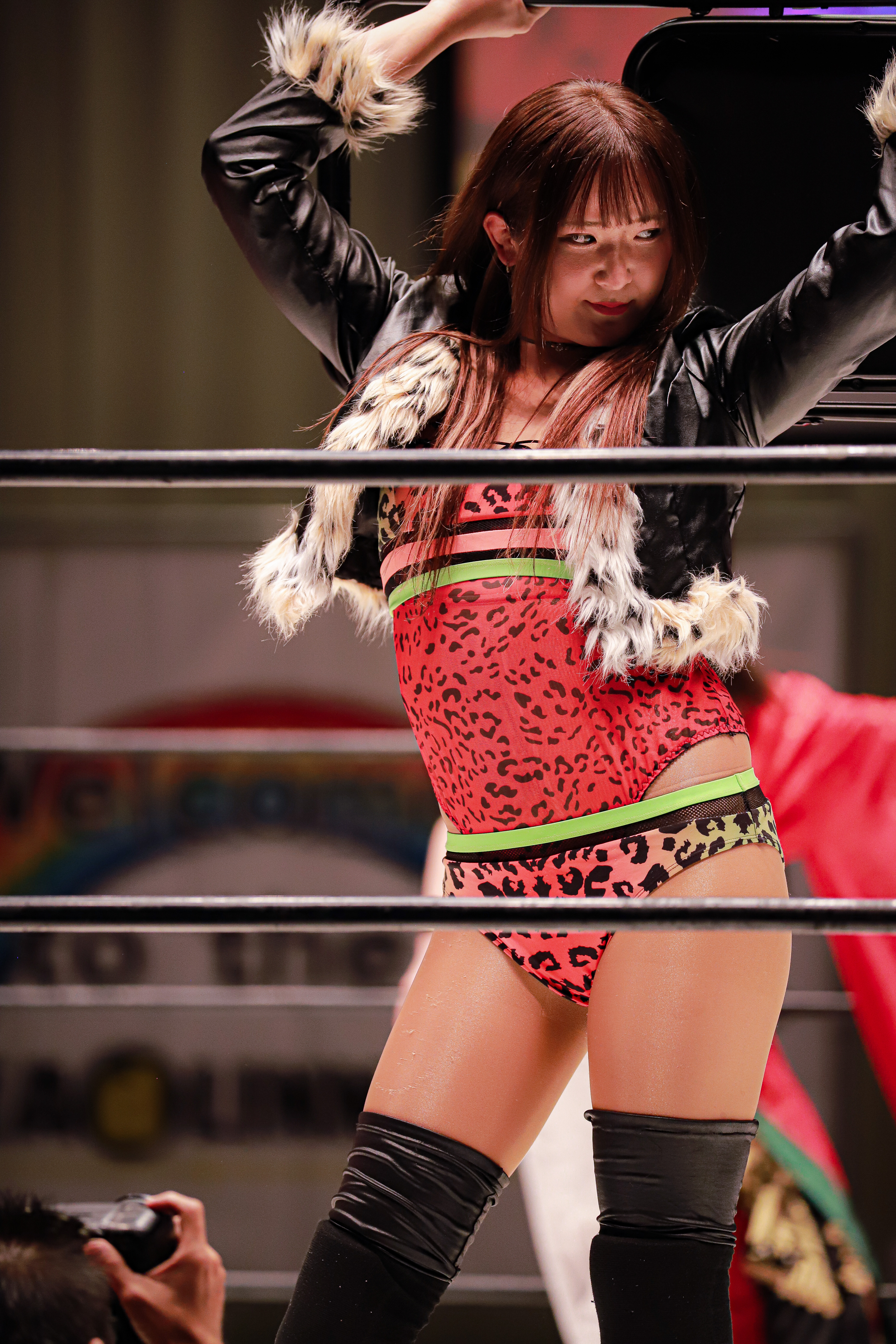
- Veny in August 2023

Personal information
- Born: October 27, 1998 (age 27) Yokohama, Japan

Professional wrestling career
- Ring names: Asuka; Tiger Queen; Venomous Veny; Veny
- Billed height: 1.75 m (5 ft 9 in)
- Billed weight: 67 kg (148 lb)
- Trained by: Ayako Hamada
- Debut: August 9, 2015

Veny (stylized in all caps, born October 27, 1998) is the ring-name of a Japanese professional wrestler currently working as a freelancer. She (Note: Veny prefers she/her pronouns over they/them, and any "genderless" moniker is usually a translation error.) is best known for being with other wrestling promotions such as Pro Wrestling Wave and Seadlinnng. She is the first known transgender wrestler from Japan, having made her debut in 2015. She was formerly known as Asuka (朱崇花).

== Professional wrestling career ==
=== Pro Wrestling Wave (2015–present) ===
Veny made her debut as a professional wrestler in Pro Wrestling Wave on August 9, 2015 in a losing effort to Yuu Yamagata. She participated in the Catch the Wave tournament in 2016, competing in the Mandarin Orange block against Dash Chisako, Yuki Miyazaki and Hibiscus Mii, finishing with two points. Veny competed at the Hana Kimura Produce HANA on August 7, 2016, where she teamed with Masato Inaba and Super Delfin to defeat Abdullah Kobayashi, Hayate and Kyoko Kimura in a six-person tag team match. Veny participated in the Catch The Wave 2018 Tournament, competing in the Crazy Block against Rina Yamashita, Nagisa Nozaki, Ryo Mizunami, Yumi Ohka and Miyuki Takase, finishing with a total of three points, and receiving a technique award due to competing while injured. Veny won the Wave Single Championship at Anivarsario Wave 2018 on August 19, where she defeated Takumi Iroha.

On July 17, 2023, Veny won the annual Catch the Wave tournament. She announced days later that she would be permanently changing her ring name to Veny.

=== Independent circuit (2015–present) ===
Veny participated in a 50-person gauntlet match at OZ Academy/Manami Toyota Produce Manami Toyota 30th Anniversary, Manami Toyota's retirement show produced by Oz Academy on November 3, 2017, where she was the 19th person to get eliminated. She participated at Zero1 Dream Series: Sozo no Jin, an event promoted by Pro Wrestling Zero1 on March 4, 2018, where she teamed up with Takuya Sugawara to unsuccessfully challenge Masamune and Sugi for the NWA International Lightweight Tag Team Championship. At Grow Together! 2021, an event promoted by Seadlinnng from March 17, Veny defeated Rina Yamashita to win the vacant Beyond the Sea Single Championship. At Zero1 20th Anniversary Series: Believe 'Z' Road from February 7, Veny unsuccessfully challenged El Lindaman for both Zero1 World Junior Heavyweight Championship and Zero1 International Junior Heavyweight Championship. Veny participated at Wrestle-1 Tour 2019 W-Impact, an event produced by Wrestle-1 on February 13, where she teamed up with Hana Kimura as FloÜrish to defeat Kaori Yoneyama and Miyuki Takase.

=== DDT Pro-Wrestling (2019–2020) ===
At Sweet Dreams 2019 on January 27, she won the Ironman Heavymetalweight Championship competing in a 8-man battle royal also involving Chinsuke Nakamura, Kazuki Hirata, Kazusada Higuchi, Keisuke Okuda, Kikutaro, Toru Owashi and Yuki Iino. At the Ganbare Pro-Wrestling event Cliffhanger 2021 on February 21, Veny teamed up with Hagane Shinno and Shinichiro Tominaga to defeat Dreams Haru True (Keisuke Ishii, Kouki Iwasaki and Harukaze) for the GWC 6-Man Tag Team Championship. At Heaven's Door 2020 on August 22, Veny defeated Hagane Shinno to win the Independent World Junior Heavyweight Championship.

=== All Elite Wrestling (2021) ===
On February 3, 2021, at Beach Break, she was announced as a participant in the AEW Women's World Championship Eliminator Tournament under the ring name Veny (stylized in all capital letters). She lost to Emi Sakura in the first round which aired on February 15. On February 28, 2021, she teamed up with Maki Itoh and Emi Sakura in a losing effort to Hikaru Shida, Mei Suruga and Rin Kadokura in a six-person tag team match.

=== Strong Style Pro-Wrestling (2021-2025) ===
On July 27, 2021, Veny would debut for Strong Style Pro-Wrestling with a Tiger Mask-inspired gimmick and mask, named Tiger Queen. Through 2023, Tiger Queen would team with Haruka Umesaki in the Strong Style Women's Tag Team Title Tournament, eventually losing in the finals to Jaguar Yokota and Megumi Yabushita on December 7. On March 13, 2025, after teaming with Nagisa Nozaki in a losing effort against Jaguar Yokota and AZM, Tiger Queen would unmask on her way backstage, officially retiring the character.

== Personal life ==
Veny is the first known transgender professional wrestler from Japan. She came out as gay to her father at the age of 16 and later dropped out of high school to pursue a professional wrestling career.

== Championships and accomplishments ==
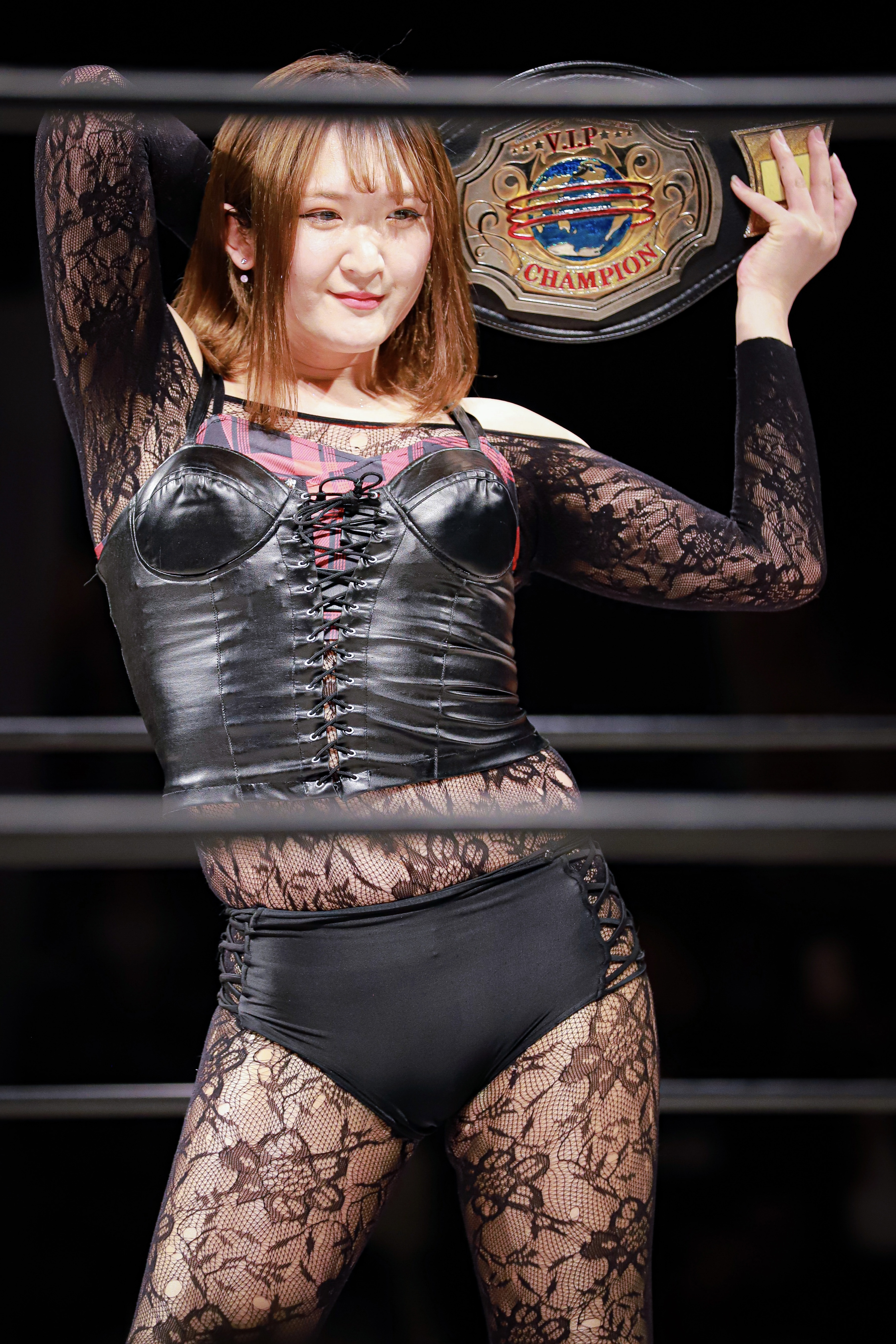
Veny holding the Sendai Girls World Championship belt

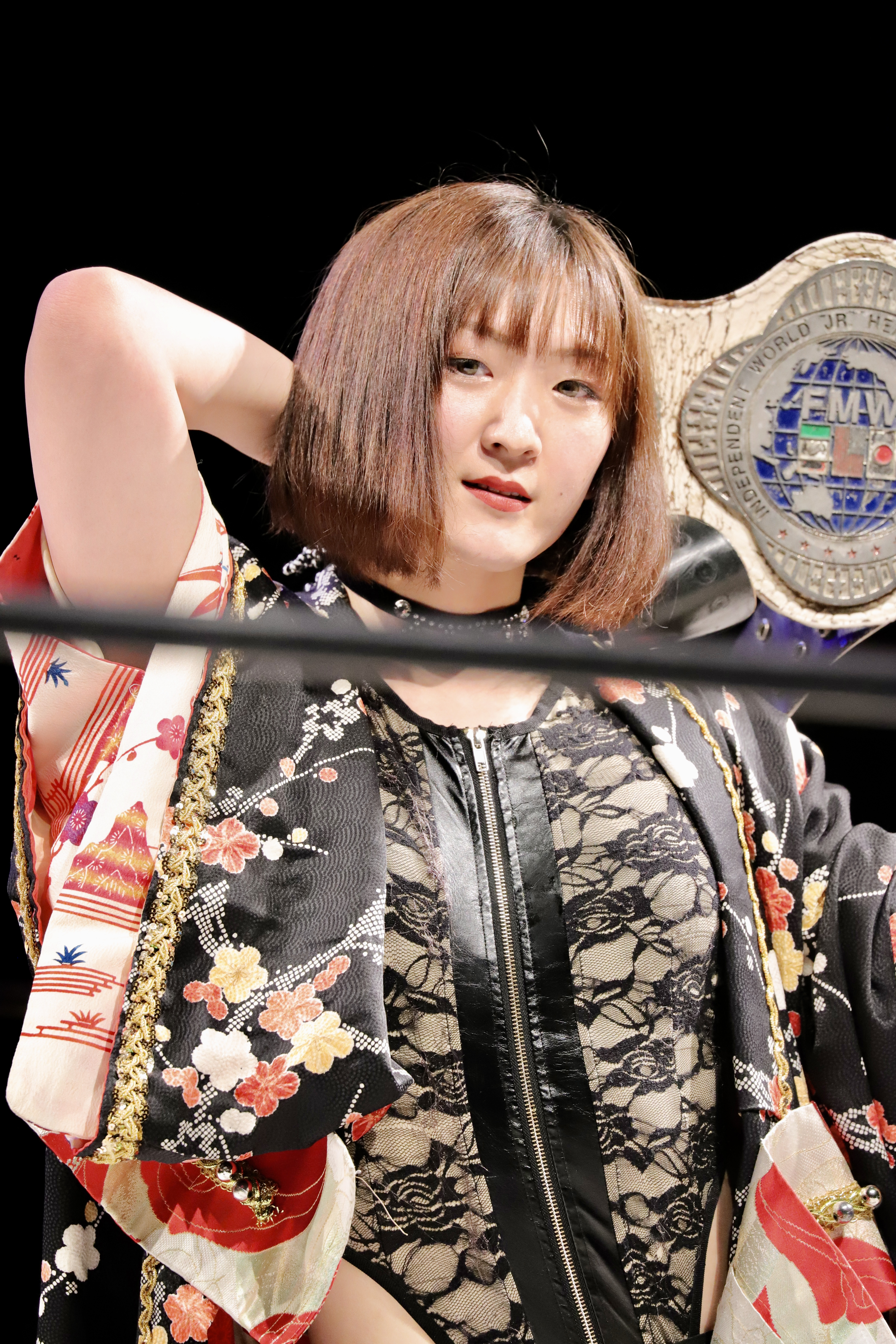
Veny holding the Independent World Junior Heavyweight Championship belt

- DDT Pro-Wrestling

- GWC 6-Man Tag Team Championship (1 time) – with Hagane Shinno and Shinichiro Tominaga
- Independent World Junior Heavyweight Championship (1 time)
- Ironman Heavymetalweight Championship (3 times)
- KO-D 10-Man Tag Team Championship (1 time) – with Danshoku Dino, Mizuki, Trans-Am★Hiroshi, and Yuki Iino
- KO-D Tag Team Championship (1 time) – with Mao

- Dream Pro wrestling
  - Dream Championship (1 time)
- Pro Wrestling Illustrated
  - Ranked No. 367 of the top 500 singles wrestlers in the PWI 500 in 2022
  - Ranked No. 50 of the top 250 female singles wrestlers in the PWI Women's 250 in 2023
  - Ranked No. 85 of the top 250 female singles wrestlers in the PWI Women's 250 in 2024
  - Ranked No. 173 of the top 250 female singles wrestlers in the PWI Women's 250 in 2025
- Pro Wrestling Wave
  - Wave Single Championship (2 times)
  - Catch the Wave (2023)
  - Catch the Wave Award (1 time)
    - Technique Award (2018)
- Pro Wrestling Zero1
  - Tenkaichi Junior (2025)
- Seadlinnng

- Beyond the Sea Single Championship (2 times)
- Beyond the Sea Tag Team Championship (2 times) – with Makoto

- Sendai Girls' Pro Wrestling

- Sendai Girls World Championship (1 time)
- Sendai Girls Tag Team Championship (1 time) – with Lena Kross

- World Woman Pro-Wrestling Diana

- WWWD World Championship (1 time)
