= Chihiro Hashimoto =

Japanese professional wrestler

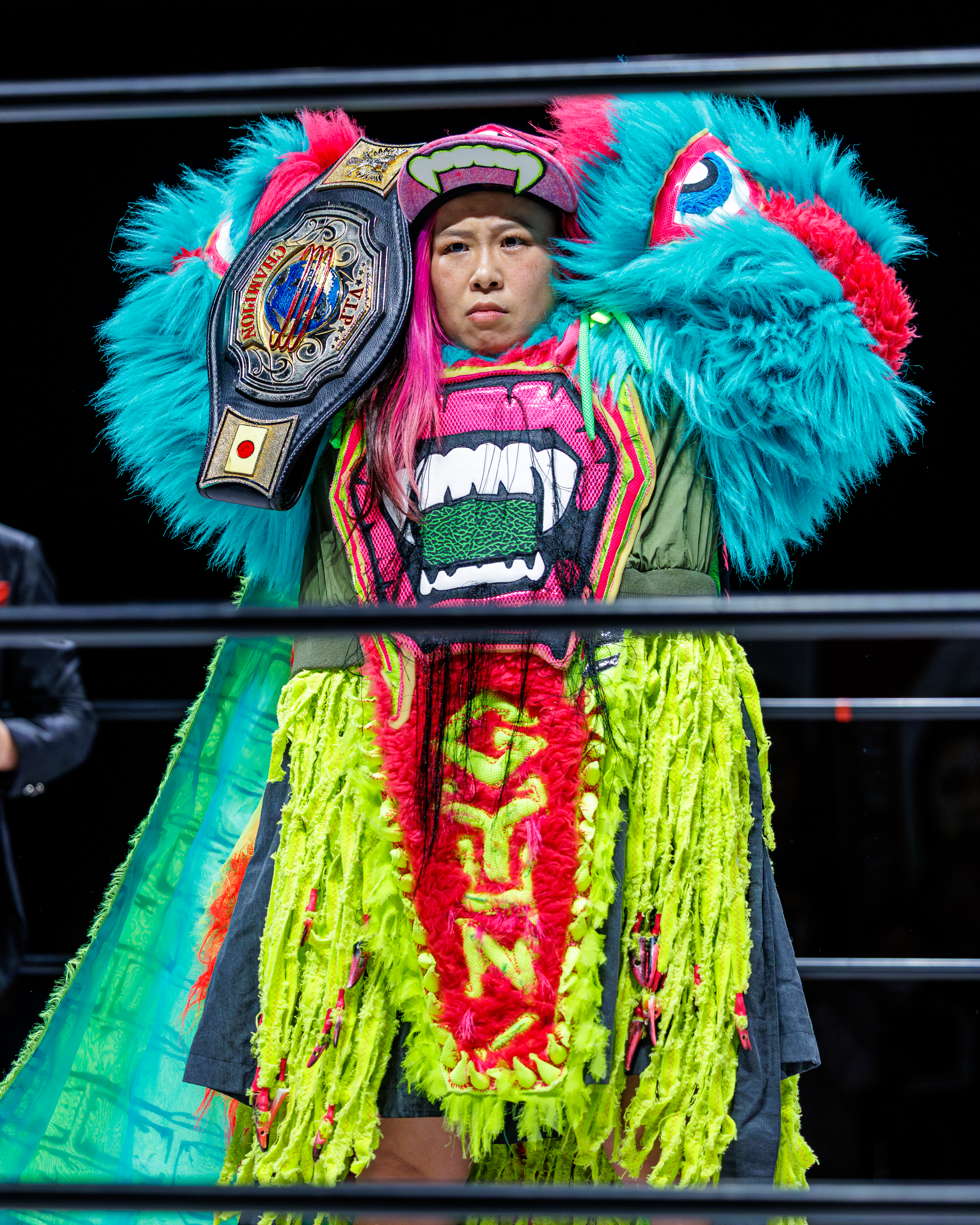
- Hashimoto in April 2026

Personal information
- Born: Chihiro Hashimoto (橋本千紘, Hashimoto Chihiro); July 1, 1992 (age 34) Sakai, Fukui, Japan
- Education: Nihon University

Professional wrestling career
- Ring name: Chihiro Hashimoto
- Billed height: 157 cm (5 ft 2 in)
- Billed weight: 70 kg (154 lb)
- Trained by: Meiko Satomura
- Debut: October 11, 2015

Chihiro Hashimoto (橋本 千紘, Hashimoto Chihiro; born July 1, 1992) is a Japanese professional wrestler currently signed to Sendai Girls' Pro Wrestling, where she is the current Sendai Girls World Champion in her sixth reign. Hashimoto was trained in the Sendai Girls' dojo under Meiko Satomura, and made her debut in October 2015. Since her debut, Hashimoto has gone on to hold the Sendai Girls World Championship five times, and was named the 2016 Rookie of the Year by Tokyo Sports, making her only the second female to win the award.

== Early life ==
Hashimoto initially took part in and passed a Sendai Girls tryout when she was 15 and still in junior high school, however, she was deemed too young and advised by president Jinsei Shinzaki to take part in either amateur wrestling or judo until she had at least finished high school. Hashimoto began competing in amateur wrestling immediately, and continued to do so in high school. She attended the Abe Gakuin High School in Tokyo, and won the Asian Junior Championship in her weight class when she was 18. That same year, she entered the All Japan Wrestling championships, placing third in her weight class. Hashimoto continued to pursue amateur wrestling into college, attending Nihon University where she placed third in the World Student Championship at the age of 20. She had hopes of competing in the 2016 Summer Olympics in Rio de Janeiro, but was unsuccessful in qualifying. She graduated from University in 2015, and after watching a match involving Meiko Satomura, decided to begin training as a wrestler once again. On June 11, she once again took and passed a tryout, and subsequently enrolled in the Sendai Girls dojo.

== Professional wrestling career ==
=== Sendai Girls' Pro Wrestling (2015–present) ===
Hashimoto was trained by Meiko Satomura and made her debut on October 11, 2015, at Sendai Girls' Pro Wrestling, teaming with Shinobu Kandori to defeat Manami Toyota and Mika Iwata. On January 9, 2016, she faced Aja Kong in a #1 contender's match for the Sendai Girls World Championship, a match she lost. On January 17, she teamed with Iwata to unsuccessfully challenge Dash Chisako and Sendai Sachiko for the Sendai Girls Tag Team Championship. On June 5, she made her debut in World Wonder Ring Stardom, defeating Jungle Kyona. On July 18, she competed in Aja Kong's 30th anniversary match, teaming with Hiroyo Matsumoto and Rina Yamashita in a loss to Aja Kong, Amazing Kong and Ayako Hamada. Throughout September and October 2016, she took part in Pro Wrestling Wave's 2016 Dual Shock Wave tournament along with Ryo Mizunami, making it to the final where they lost to Dynamite Kansai and Yamashita. On October 16, she defeated her mentor Meiko Satomura to become the Sendai Girls World Champion for the first time. She made one successful defence against Cassandra Miyagi before losing the title to Aja Kong on January 9, 2017. On March 9 she returned to Stardom to compete in Io Shirai's 10th Anniversary match, teaming with Mayu Iwatani in a loss to Shirai and Satomura. On April 6, 2017, she defeated Kong to become the Sendai Girls World Champion for the second time. She lost the title to Hiroyo Matsumoto on June 10, only to regain it on July 15. Hashimoto successfully defended the championship against Meiko Satomura and Cassandra Miyagi, before losing it to Ayako Hamada on April 19, 2018. Shortly after Hashimoto dropped the championship to Hamada, Hamada was stripped of the title after her arrest on drug charges. On June 24, 2018, Hashimoto won the title again, making her a four time champion.

== Personal life ==
Outside of professional wrestling, Hashimoto enjoys photography.

== Championships and accomplishments ==
- All Japan Pro Wrestling
  - AJPW TV Six-Man Tag Team Championship (1 time) – with Shuji Ishikawa and Yuu
- DDT Pro-Wrestling
  - KO-D 6-Man Tag Team Championship (1 time) – with Dash Chisako and Meiko Satomura
- Marvelous That's Women Pro Wrestling
  - AAAW Tag Team Championship (1 time) – with Yuu
- Pro Wrestling Illustrated
  - Ranked No. 37 of the top 100 female wrestlers in the PWI Female 100 in 2018
  - Ranked No. 138 of the top 150 women's wrestlers in the PWI Women's 150 in 2021
  - Ranked No. 47 of the top 250 women's wrestlers in the PWI Women's 250 in 2024
- Sendai Girls' Pro Wrestling
  - Sendai Girls Tag Team Championship (6 times) – with Mika Iwata (1) and Yuu (5)
  - Sendai Girls World Championship (6 times, current)
- Tokyo Sports
  - Rookie of the Year (2016)
- Westside Xtreme Wrestling
  - wXw Women's Championship (1 time, current)
  - wXw Femmes Fatales (2026)
