= Michiko Miyagi =

Japanese professional wrestler

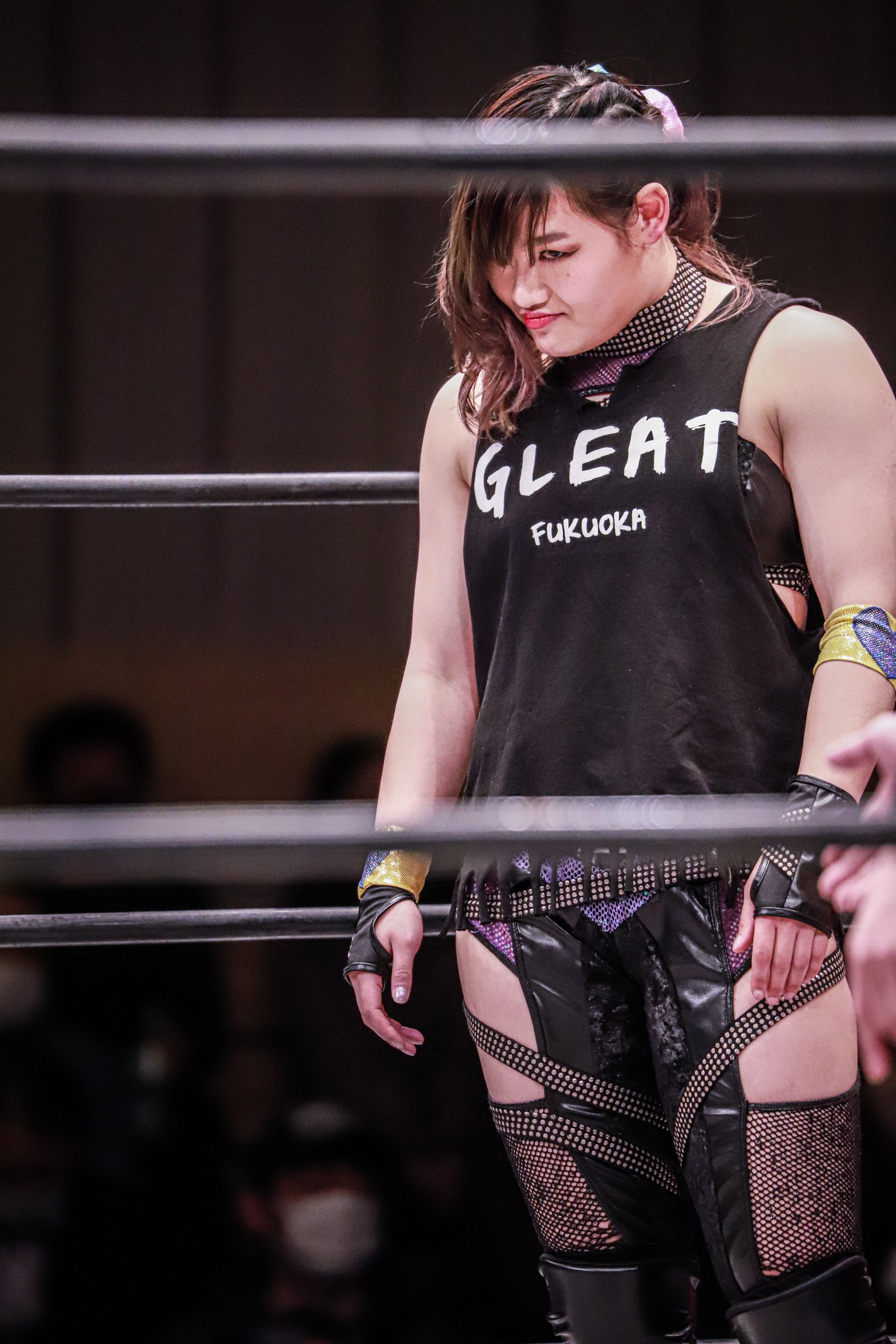
- Miyagi in February 2022

Personal information
- Born: March 16, 1993 (age 33) Yamaguchi, Japan

Professional wrestling career
- Ring name(s): Andras Miyagi; Cassandra Miyagi; Michiko Miyagi; Trainee Miyagi
- Billed height: 167 cm (5 ft 6 in)
- Billed weight: 65 kg (143 lb)
- Trained by: Meiko Satomura
- Debut: 2014

Michiko Miyagi (宮城倫子, Miyagi Michiko), better known by her ring names Cassandra Miyagi (カサンドラ宮城, Kasandora Miyagi) and Andras Miyagi (アンドラス宮城, Andorasu Miyagi), is a Japanese professional wrestler currently working for the Japanese promotion Gleat. She is also known for her tenure with World Wonder Ring Stardom where she is a former Artist of Stardom Champion.

== Professional wrestling career ==
=== Sendai Girls' Pro Wrestling (2014–2021) ===
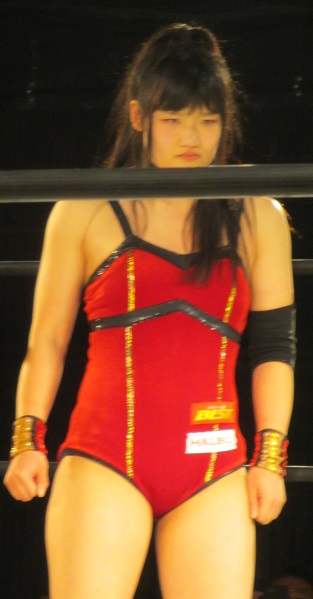
Miyagi in March 2015 while competing in Sendai Girls' Pro Wrestling.

Miyagi made her professional wrestling debut at a house show of Sendai Girls' Pro Wrestling from November 24, 2014, where she fell short to Kyoko Kimura. In Sendai Girls' she competed under both ring names of Cassandra and Andras Miyagi.

=== Independent circuit (2014–present) ===
Miyagi is known for working as a freelancer in the Japanese independent scene especially in men's promotion as a joshi talent. At Seadlinnng Let's Go Now on May 18, 2016, she teamed up with Yumiko Hotta to defeat Mika Iwata and Yuki Miyazaki. At Dragon Gate The Gate Of Origin 2018, an event promoted by Dragon Gate on September 9, 2018, she teamed up with Masaaki Mochizuki to defeat Meiko Satomura and Stalker Ichikawa as a result of an intergender tag team match. At K-DOJO 17th Anniversary GRAND SLAM In Korakuen Hall, an event promoted by Kaientai Dojo on April 13, 2019, she teamed up with Aki Shizuku in a losing effort against Bambi and Rina Shingaki. At Hana Kimura Memorial Show, an independent event produced by Kyoko Kimura on May 23, 2021, to commemorate one year since the death of her daughter Hana Kimura, Miyagi competed in a 28-person All-Star Battle Royal won by Ram Kaicho and also involving notable opponents such as Shotaro Ashino, Fuminori Abe, Menso-re Oyaji, Yuko Miyamoto, Jun Kasai, Jinsei Shinzaki, Cima, Masato Tanaka and many others. At JTO Samurai! TV Match, an event promoted by Professional Wrestling Just Tap Out on May 31, 2020, Miyagi fell short to Maika.

=== Chikara (2016–2017) ===
Miyagi briefly competed in the American independent scene. Initially she took part in the 2016 edition of Chikara's King of Trios tournament where she teamed up with Dash Chisako and Meiko Satomura. They started by defeating Heidi Lovelace and N_R_G in the first round, The Colony (Fire Ant, Silver Ant and Soldier Ant) in the quarter-finals, The Warriors Three (Oleg the Usurper, Princess KimberLee and ThunderFrog) in the semi-finals and Team JWP (Command Bolshoi, Hanako Nakamori and Manami Katsu) in the finals on September 4. At the 2017 edition of the event, Miyagi teamed up again with Chisako and Satomura, this time under the name of House Sendai Girls, succeeding in defeating House Xyberhawx (Nytehawk, Razerhawk and Sylverhawk) on the first rounds, House Seven Seas (Cajun Crawdad, Hermit Crab and Merlok) in the quarter-finals, Casa Dorada (Juan Francisco de Coronado, Cornelius Crummels and Sonny Defarge) in the semi-finals, but falling short to House Strong Style (Pete Dunne, Trent Seven and Tyler Bate) in the finals on September 5.

=== DDT Pro-Wrestling (2017–2019) ===
Miyagi made her DDT Pro-Wrestling debut via its sub-brand Ganbare☆Pro-Wrestling (GanPro), when she defeated Ai Shimizu at Get Down 2017, on February 11.

She then toured with the main DDT brand between May and October 2018. At DDT Live! Maji Manji #12, on July 23, Miyagi teamed up with Dash Chisako and Meiko Satomura to unsuccessfully challenge All Out (Akito, Konosuke Takeshita and Shunma Katsumata) for the KO-D 6-Man Tag Team Championship. She most notably made an appearance at the annual Ryōgoku Peter Pan event on October 21, in a match where she teamed up with Meiko Satomura to defeat Maki Itoh and Saki Akai.

Her last appearance with the company was at the GanPro event Don't Stop Me Now 2019, on February 21, where she faced Moeka Haruhi twice, with both matches ending in a double countout.

=== World Wonder Ring Stardom (2019–2020) ===
Miyagi debuted in World Wonder Ring Stardom on February 17, 2019, at Stardom Queen's Fest as part of the Oedo Tai stable and teamed up with Kagetsu to defeat JAN (Jungle Kyona and Natsuko Tora). She debuted under the ring name of Andras Miyagi which she would use in her entire tenure with the promotion. At Stardom World Big Summer in Osaka on July 20, 2019, Miyagi teamed up with Kagetsu and Sumire Natsu to defeat Stars (Mayu Iwatani, Saki Kashima and Tam Nakano) to win the Artist of Stardom Championship. She held the titles alongside her stablemates for slightly over four months until eventually dropping them to Queen's Quest (AZM, Momo Watanabe and Utami Hayashishita). Miyagi participated in the 2019 edition of the Goddesses of Stardom Tag League where she teamed up with Kagetsu, placing themselves in the "Red Goddess Block" and scoring a total of four points after competing against the teams of Dream Shine (Arisa Hoshiki and Tam Nakano), Tokyo Cyber Squad (Death Yama-san and Hana Kimura), Bobbi Tyler and Zoe Lucas, Oedo Tai (Martina and Sumire Natsu), and 3838 Tag (Saya Iida and Saya Kamitani). At Stardom World Big Summer In Tokyo on July 24, 2019, she teamed up with Kagetsu to unsuccessfully challenge Tokyo Cyber Squad (Jungle Kyona and Konami) for the Goddesses of Stardom Championship. At Mask Fiesta 2019 on October 27, Miyagi wrestled under the ring name Trainee Miyagi 2-on-1 handicap win over Cyber Cat and Masyu Pinya. Furtherly, Miyagi got kicked out of Oedo Tai and wrestled her last match in Stardom on the fourth night of the Stardom New Years Stars 2020 on January 12 where she teamed up with Giulia in a losing effort against Tokyo Cyber Squad (Jungle Kyona and Konami).

=== Actwres girl'Z (2020) ===
Miyagi worked for Actwres girl'Z under the name of Michiko Miyagi. At AWG Act 48 event from November 1, 2020, at her second-ever match into the promotion, she unsuccessfully challenged Miyuki Takase for the AgZ Championship. At Ice Ribbon/AWG Ice Ribbon & Actwres girl'Z Joint Show, an event produced in partnership with Ice Ribbon on November 16, 2020, teamed up with Mochi Miyagi to defeat Misa Matsui and Risa Sera. At AWG Act In Osaka on December 13, 2020, Miyagi teamed up with Misa Matsui and fell short to Hikari Shimizu and Saki in the semi-finals of a tournament for the AWG Tag Team Championship.

== Championships and accomplishments ==
- Chikara

- King of Trios (2016) – with Dash Chisako and Meiko Satomura

- Kitsune Women's Wrestling
  - Kitsune World Championship (1 time, current)
- Sendai Girls' Pro Wrestling

- Sendai Girls Tag Team Championship (3 times) – with Dash Chisako (1), Heidi Katrina (1) and Hibiki (1)

- World Wonder Ring Stardom

- Artist of Stardom Championship (1 time) – with Kagetsu and Natsu Sumire
