= Sendai Sachiko =

Japanese professional wrestler

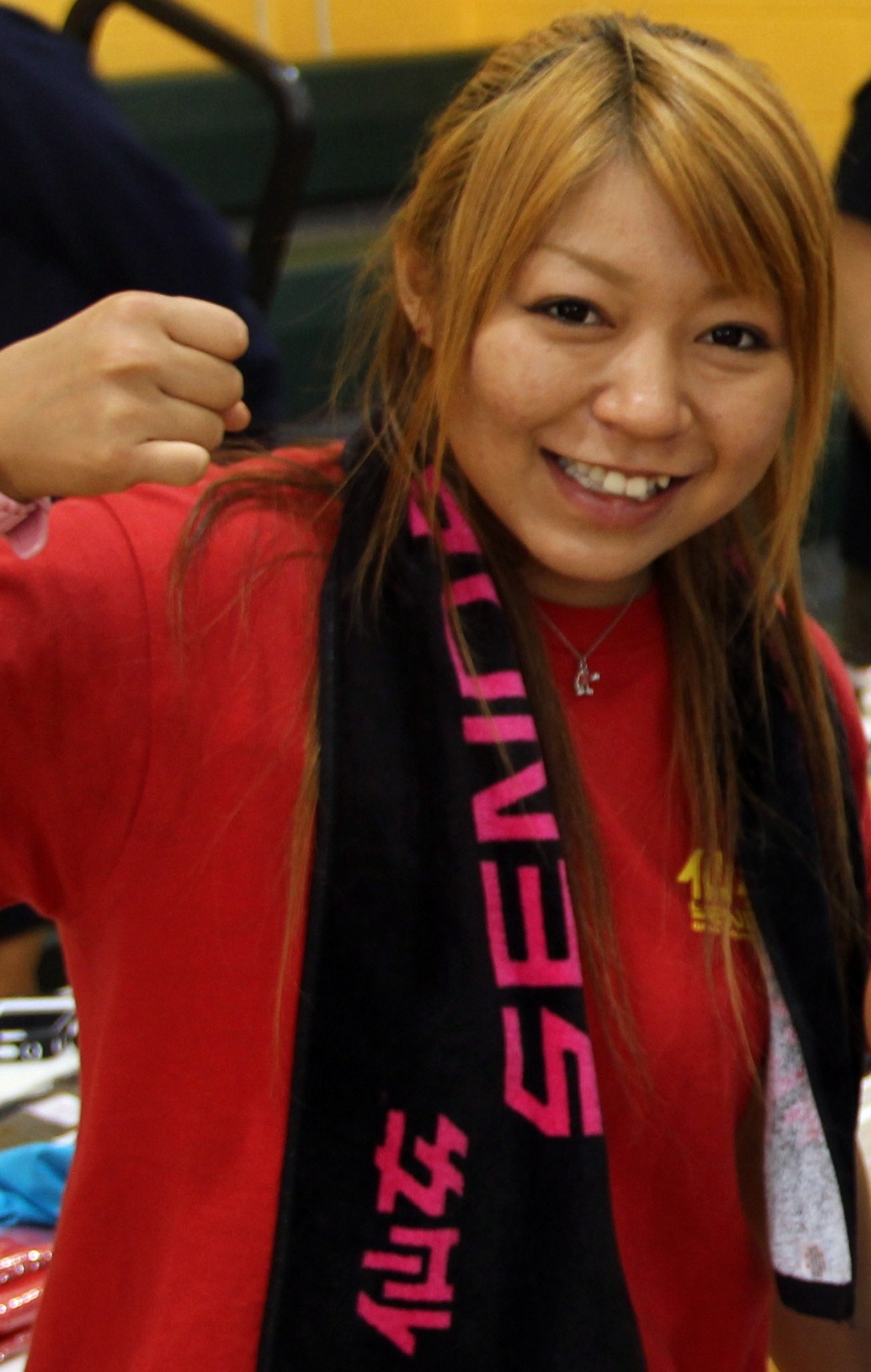
- Sachiko in September 2012

Personal information
- Born: Sachiko Jumonji; December 26, 1989 (age 36) Sendai, Miyagi
- Family: Dash Chisako (sister)

Professional wrestling career
- Ring name(s): Sachiko Kanari; Sendai Sachiko
- Billed height: 1.54 m (5 ft 1/2 in)
- Billed weight: 58 kg (128 lb)
- Trained by: Meiko Satomura
- Debut: July 9, 2006
- Retired: January 17, 2016

Sachiko Jumonji (十文字 幸子, Jūmonji Sachiko; born December 26, 1989) is a retired Japanese professional wrestler, better known by the ring name Sendai Sachiko (仙台幸子, Sendai Sachiko). She was trained by Meiko Satomura and made her debut for her Sendai Girls' Pro Wrestling promotion in July 2006. Her older sister Chisako is also a professional wrestler, working under the ring name Dash Chisako, and together the two have held the Sendai Girls World Tag Team Championship, Ice Ribbon's International Ribbon Tag Team Championship and JWP Joshi Puroresu's JWP and Daily Sports Women's Tag Team Championships and World Woman Pro-Wrestling Diana's WWWD World Tag Team Championship, while also having won JWP's 2013 Tag League the Best tournament. Jumonji remained with Sendai Girls' Pro Wrestling her entire career, before retiring in January 2016.

== Professional wrestling career ==
=== Sendai Girls' Pro Wrestling (2005–2016) ===
On October 2, 2005, Jumonji, along with her sister Chisako, took part in a professional wrestling audition held by Meiko Satomura. After passing the audition, both of the Jumonji sisters were admitted to the first training class of Satomura's new Sendai Girls' Pro Wrestling promotion, and began training under her the following December. Jumonji made her professional wrestling debut on July 9, 2006, at Sendai Girls' first ever event, where she, working under the ring name Sachiko Kanari, was defeated by Kyoko Inoue. Much like her sister, Jumonji's career started with a losing streak, which finally ended on May 6, 2007, when she defeated Yurie Kaneko. In August, the Jumonji sisters began regularly wrestling together as a tag team, and on September 8, both of them were given new ring names, when Sachiko began wrestling as Sendai Sachiko and her sister as Dash Chisako. In late 2007, the sisters also began making appearances for Ibuki and JWP Joshi Puroresu, with one notable match seeing the Jumonji sisters defeating the Shirai sisters (Io and Mio) on December 31, 2007, at JWP's 5th Junior All Star event.

Following the loss, both Sachiko and Chisako began concentrating on their singles careers. On January 18, 2008, Sachiko made it to the finals of the 1st New Year tournament, before losing to Ryo Mizunami. On May 23, Sachiko was eliminated by Ayako Sato in the quarterfinals of her first Jaja Uma tournament. The following month, Sachiko reformed her tag team with her sister. On December 21, the Jumonji sisters made it to the finals of a one night tag team tournament, before losing to the team of Devil Masami and Ryo Mizunami. Back in Ibuki, Sachiko received her first singles championship shot, when she unsuccessfully challenged Hiroyo Matsumoto for the JWP Junior and Princess of Pro-Wrestling Championships on February 1, 2009. On March 29, Sachiko entered Sendai's 2009 Jaja Uma tournament, defeating Yamada in her first match, the second round of the tournament. On April 19, Sachiko first defeated Misaki Ohata in the semifinals and then Ryo Mizunami in the finals to win the 2009 Jaja Uma tournament. However, Sachiko's singles career came to a halt on May 31, 2009, when she broke her fibula and tore ligaments in her left ankle in an Ibuki match, where she, Ryo Mizunami and Yukari Ishino faced Esui, Fuka and Shuu Shibutani, leaving her sidelined from professional wrestling for ten months.

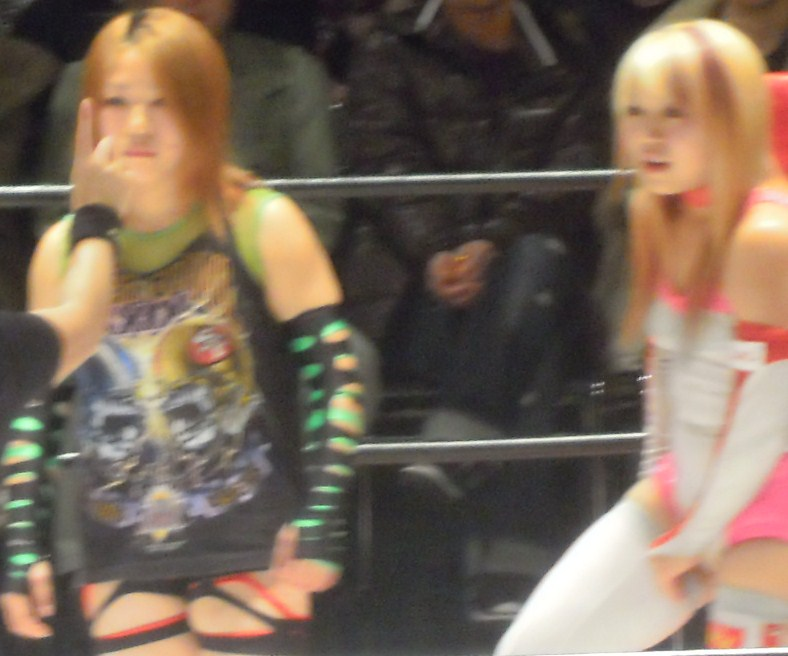
The Jumonji sisters in December 2010

Sachiko finally made her return on April 9, 2010, losing to Dash Chisako in the first round of the 2nd Battle Field tournament. The following month, the Jumonji sisters reformed their tag team. On August 22, Sachiko made her debut for the Oz Academy promotion, teaming with Chisako in a tag team match, where they were defeated by Hiroyo Matsumoto and Tomoka Nakagawa. On September 23, Sachiko made her debut for Ice Ribbon, taking part in the interpromotional rivalry between Sendai Girls' Pro Wrestling and Ice Ribbon, when she, Chisako, Hiren, Kagetsu and Ryo Mizunami teamed in a ten-woman captain's fall tag team match, where they defeated Makoto, Hikaru Shida, Kazumi Shimouna, Natsuki☆Taiyo and Tsukasa Fujimoto. In January 2011, Sachiko began an extended tour of working exclusively for Okinawa Pro Wrestling; the tour was eventually extended until May 23, due to Sendai Girls' going inactive in the aftermath of the Tōhoku earthquake and tsunami, which caused severe damage to the city of Sendai. On July 7, Sachiko returned to Sendai Girls', working at the promotion's first event since the disaster. During 2011, Sachiko also made debuts for World Woman Pro-Wrestling Diana, World Wonder Ring Stardom and Universal Woman's Pro Wrestling Reina, where she made it to the semifinals of the CMLL-Reina International Junior Championship tournament, before losing to Zeuxis. After defeating the Lovely Butchers (Hamuko Hoshi and Mochi Miyagi) at an Ice Ribbon event on August 21, 2011, the Jumonji sisters were invited to take part in a tournament to determine the new International Ribbon Tag Team Champions. On September 24, Sachiko and Chisako entered the one night tournament, first defeating Hikari Minami and Riho in the first round and then the Lovely Butchers in the semifinals. Finally, Sachiko and Chisako defeated the team of Manami Toyota and Tsukushi in the finals to win the vacant International Ribbon Tag Team Championship, the first title for both of the sisters. The Jumonji sisters made their first title defense on October 15, wrestling Tsukasa Fujimoto and Tsukushi to a time limit draw, which meant that they were stripped of the title, which was again declared vacant. On October 27, both Sachiko and Chisako were entered into Team Sendai in the Joshi Puroresu Dantai Taikou Flash tournament, a single-elimination tournament, where different joshi promotions battled each other. In their first round match, Team Sendai, which besides the Jumonji sisters included Kagetsu, Meiko Satomura and Miyako Morino, defeated Team Ice Ribbon, which included Emi Sakura, Hikari Minami, Hikaru Shida, Tsukasa Fujimoto and Tsukushi. As each round progressed in the tournament, the number of participants in each team was reduced, which meant that neither Sachiko nor Chisako wrestled in the remaining matches, but were ringside for the finals, where Kagetsu and Satomura defeated Team Stardom's Nanae Takahashi and Yoshiko to win the tournament for Team Sendai. The rivalry between Sendai Girls' and Ice Ribbon ended on December 25, 2011, at RibbonMania, where Sachiko and Meiko Satomura faced Emi Sakura and Tsukushi in a decision match for the vacant International Ribbon Tag Team Championship. The match ended with Tsukushi pinning Sachiko for the win, earning Ice Ribbon the final victory over Sendai Girls', who had previously dominated the rivalry.

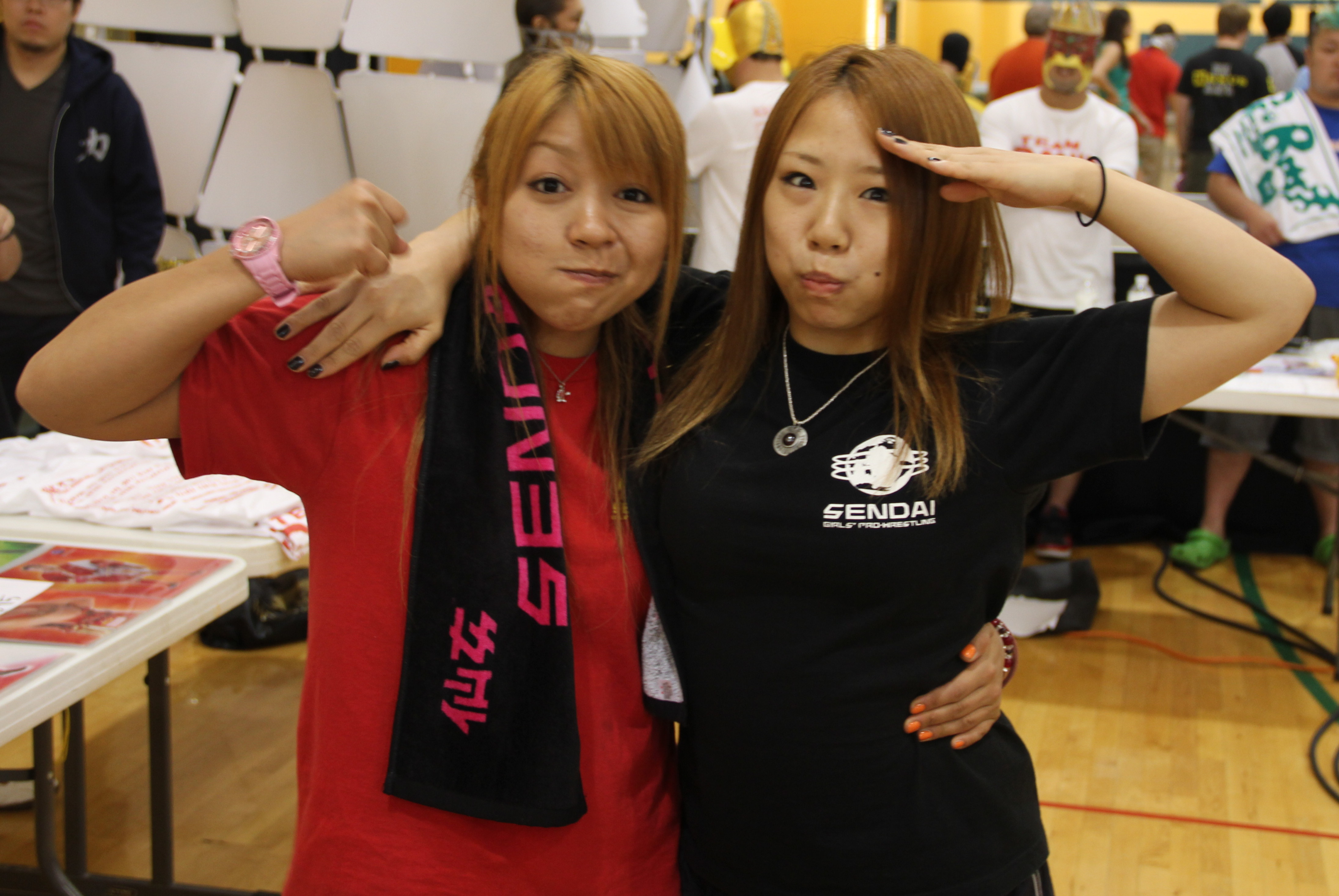
The Jumonji sisters in September 2012

From January to March 2012, the Jumonji sisters took part in JWP's Tag League the Best, contested for the JWP and Daily Sports Women's Tag Team Championships. After two wins and two losses, Sachiko and Chisako failed to advance to the finals of the tournament. On March 12, Sendai Girls' Pro Wrestling presented a special exhibition tag team match at a Dragon Gate event in Sendai, in which the Jumonji sisters were defeated by Kagetsu and Meiko Satomura. On March 19, Chikara announced that Sachiko, along with Dash Chisako, Kagetsu and Meiko Satomura, would be making her American debut for the promotion during its tenth anniversary weekend in May. During the first night of the weekend on May 19 in Easton, Pennsylvania, the Jumonji sisters were defeated in a tag team match by Kagetsu and Satomura. The following day in Manhattan, New York, the Jumonji sisters defeated the Bravado Brothers (Harlem and Lancelot) in an intergender tag team match. On June 25, Sendai Girls' held its final event in the promotion's home arena, Zepp Sendai, which was scheduled to close down the following month. In the main event of the show, Sachiko and Chisako picked up a major win over the veteran tag team of Kyoko Inoue and Manami Toyota. On July 25, Chikara announced that Sachiko would be returning to the promotion in September to participate in the 2012 King of Trios tournament in Easton, Pennsylvania, where she would form a trio with Dash Chisako and Meiko Satomura. Team Sendai Girls wrestled in the opening match of the tournament on September 14 and advanced to the quarter-finals after a win over a team, which included assailAnt and two thirds of the previous year's King of Trios winners, Fire Ant and Green Ant. The following day, Team Sendai Girls picked up another big win, this time over the trio of Jigsaw, Manami Toyota and Mike Quackenbush, to advance to the semifinals of the tournament. On the third and final day of the tournament, Team Sendai Girls was eliminated from the tournament in the semifinals by Team ROH (Mike Bennett, Matt Jackson and Nick Jackson).

On December 24, the Jumonji sisters returned to JWP, wrestling in a tag team match, where they were defeated by Kay Lee Ray and Leon. On February 17, 2013, Sachiko and Chisako entered JWP's 2013 Tag League the Best tournament, defeating Manami Katsu and Rabbit Miu in their opening round-robin match. On March 3, the Jumonji sisters made their debut for Michinoku Pro Wrestling, losing to Kagetsu and Meiko Satomura in a "Sendai Girls' offer match". Sachiko and Chisako continued their Tag League the Best tournament on March 10 with a draw against Kazuki and Sachie Abe. On March 31, the sisters qualified for the finals of the tournament, when Kazuki and Abe failed to defeat Katsu and Miu in their final round-robin match. On April 7, Sachiko and Chisako defeated Hanako Nakamori and Morii in the finals to win the 2013 Tag League the Best and become the number one contenders to the Daily Sports Women's Tag Team and JWP Tag Team Championships. The sisters received their title shot on April 14, but were defeated by the defending champions, Kayoko Haruyama and Tsubasa Kuragaki. On October 14, Sachiko made her debut for Pro Wrestling Zero1, losing to Meiko Satomura in another "Sendai Girls' offer match". On November 10, Sachiko and Chisako entered World Wonder Ring Stardom's 2013 Goddesses of Stardom Tag Tournament, but were defeated in their first round match by the previous year's tournament winners, Kawasaki Katsushika Saikyou Densetsu (Natsuki☆Taiyo and Yoshiko). On November 24, the Jumonji sisters returned to JWP Joshi Puroresu, defeating The☆Wanted!? (Kazuki and Sachie Abe) in the first round of a tournament for the vacant JWP and Daily Sports Women's Tag Team Championships. On December 15, the Jumonji sisters defeated Mascara Voladoras (Leon and Ray) in the finals to win the tournament and become the new JWP and Daily Sports Women's Tag Team Champions. On April 1, it was announced that Sachiko had injured the anterior cruciate ligament and meniscus in her left knee during practice, forcing her to undergo surgery the following day. As a result, Sachiko and Chisako vacated the JWP and Daily Sports Women's Tag Team Championships on April 11.

Sachiko's return match took place at a Sendai Girls' event on January 21, 2015, when she and Chisako were defeated in a tag team main event by Command Bolshoi and Kyoko Kimura. On April 5, Sachiko and Chisako returned to JWP to receive their rematch for the JWP and Daily Sports Women's Tag Team Championships, but were defeated by the defending champions, Leon and Ray. Another rematch took place on July 26 and saw Sachiko and Chisako defeat Ray and Leon to win the JWP and Daily Sports Women's Tag Team Championships for the second time.

On August 25, Sachiko announced that, after getting married, she was retiring from professional wrestling on January 17, 2016. On September 16, Sachiko and Chisako won another tag team title, when they defeated Meiko Tanaka and Sareee to win the vacant World Woman Pro-Wrestling Diana (WWWD) World Tag Team Championship. On September 22, Sachiko and Chisako made their first successful defense of the JWP and Daily Sports Women's Tag Team Championships against Kayoko Haruyama and Tsubasa Kuragaki. The following day, Sachiko and Chisako failed in their attempt to capture another tag team title, World Wonder Ring Stardom's Goddesses of Stardom Championship, from Io Shirai and Mayu Iwatani. On October 11, Sachiko and Chisako defeated Kyoko Kimura and Takumi Iroha in a decision match to become the inaugural Sendai Girls World Tag Team Champions, becoming "quadruple crown tag team champions" in the process. In November, Sendai Girls' Pro Wrestling and Stardom held two shows together that pitted wrestlers from the two promotions against each other. During the second event on November 15, Sachiko unsuccessfully challenged Io Shirai for the Wonder of Stardom Championship. On December 27, Sachiko and Chisako lost the JWP and Daily Sports Women's Tag Team Championships to Arisa Nakajima and Tsukasa Fujimoto.

On January 17, 2016, Sendai Girls' Pro Wrestling held Sachiko's retirement event, during which she wrestled twice. First she and Chisako successfully defended the Sendai Girls World Tag Team Championship against Chihiro Hashimoto and Mika Iwata, relinquishing the title immediately after their win. Then Sachiko, along with ten other wrestlers taking part in the event, wrestled in a battle royal, which was won by Chisako, who pinned Sachiko to end her career. Sachiko and Chisako held possession of the WWWD World Tag Team Championship belts until February 28, when Meiko Satomura returned them to Diana.

== Personal life ==
Jumonji was married on July 8, 2015.

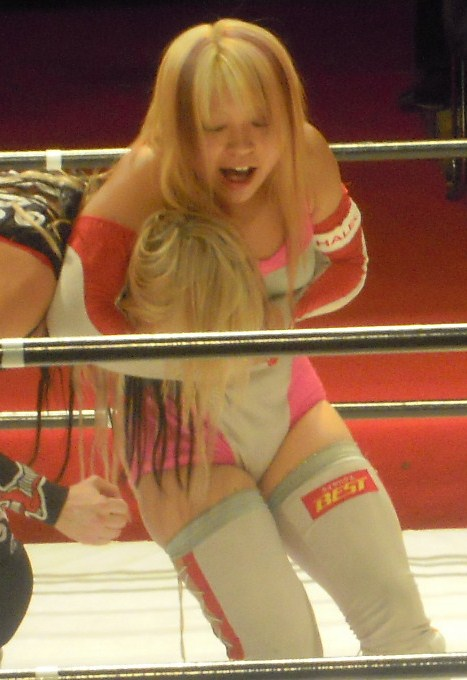
Sachiko performing a headlock on Tsubasa Kuragaki

== Championships and accomplishments ==
- Ice Ribbon
  - International Ribbon Tag Team Championship (1 time) – with Dash Chisako
  - Yokohama Ribbon Tag Team Tournament (2011) – with Dash Chisako
- JWP Joshi Puroresu
  - Daily Sports Women's Tag Team Championship (2 times) – with Dash Chisako
  - JWP Tag Team Championship (2 times) – with Dash Chisako
  - JWP Tag League the Best (2013) – with Dash Chisako
  - JWP Tag Team and Daily Sports Women's Tag Team Championship Tournament (2013) – with Dash Chisako
  - 5th Junior All Star Fighting Spirit Award (2007) – with Dash Chisako
  - JWP Year-End Award (1 time)
    - Enemy Award (2015) – with Dash Chisako
- Sendai Girls' Pro Wrestling
  - Sendai Girls Tag Team Championship (1 time) – with Dash Chisako
  - Jaja Uma Tournament (2009)
  - Joshi Puroresu Dantai Taikou Flash Tournament (2011) – with Dash Chisako, Hiren, Kagetsu, Meiko Satomura, Miyako Morino and Ryo Mizunami
- World Woman Pro-Wrestling Diana
  - WWWD World Tag Team Championship (1 time) – with Dash Chisako
