= Sendai Girls' Pro Wrestling =

Japanese women's professional wrestling promotion

- Acronym: Senjo
- Founded: 2005
- Style: Joshi puroresu
- Headquarters: Japan
- Founder(s): Meiko Satomura; Jinsei Shinzaki
- Predecessor: Gaea Japan

Sendai Girls' Pro Wrestling (センダイガールズプロレスリング, Sendai Gāruzu Puroresuringu), often called Senjo (仙女, Senjo), is a Japanese women's professional wrestling promotion. It is based in the city of Sendai, Miyagi in the Tohoku region.

== History ==
Sendai Girls' Pro Wrestling was founded in 2005 by Meiko Satomura, a female professional wrestler who achieved success in the 2000s with the women's promotion Gaea Japan, and Jinsei Shinzaki, a male professional wrestler who is also the president of Michinoku Pro Wrestling.

As the only experienced wrestler on the initial roster, Satomura served as the trainer and booker in addition to her duties as a wrestler. On July 9, 2006 the new promotion held its first show in front of 2498 fans at Sendai's Sun Plaza. This show consisted of Senjo's first four wrestlers making their debuts in singles matches against four legends of joshi puroresu. The main event featured Satomura against Aja Kong, whom she has feuded with throughout her career. Due to the small size of the roster, most of Senjo's subsequent shows have featured the Sendai girls facing wrestlers from other promotions.

It was confirmed that Sendai will hold an event on July 27, 2019 in Manchester, England, along with the British promotion Fight Club: Pro. This was Sendai's first event outside of Japan.

On the last night of World Wonder Ring Stardom's Stardom Cinderella Tournament 2021, Rin Kadokura made an appearance by teaming up with members of the Stars stable Mayu Iwatani, Starlight Kid, Hanan and Koguma to face Oedo Tai's Natsuko Tora, Konami, Fukigen Death, Ruaka and Saki Kashima.

On February 22, 2024, it was announced that Sendai Girls' events would be aired on Wrestle Universe streaming service on the following month. On April 29, 2025, Satomura retired from in-ring competition where she teamed with Manami to defeat the team of Aja Kong and Chihiro Hashimoto. On January 30, 2026, Sendai Girls' joined United Japan Pro-Wrestling (UJPW).

== Roster ==
Ring name	Real name	Notes
Chihiro Hashimoto	Chihiro Hashimoto	Sendai Girls World Champion
Dash Chisako	Chisako Jumonji	Inactive; maternity leave
Manami	Manami Yamazoe	Sendai Girls Tag Team Champion
Mika Iwata	Mika Iwata	
Miyuki Takase	Miyuki Takase	
Ryo Mizunami	Ayane Mizumura	Sendai Girls Tag Team Champion
Spike Nishimura	Unknown	
Yuna	Unknown	
Yurika Oka	Unknown	
Reina Takano	Unknown	
Safire Reed	Unknown	
Anita Vaughan	Unknoen	

=== Management ===
Ring name	Real name	Notes
Meiko Satomura	Meiko Satomura	Co-founder; Representative director
Jinsei Shinzaki	Kensuke Shinzaki	Co-founder

=== Notable alumni/guests ===
- Akari
- Alex Lee
- Andras Miyagi
- Aja Kong
- Ami Miura
- Charli Evans
- Chie Ozora
- Crea
- Gami
- Hikaru Shida
- Hibiki
- Hiren
- Hiroyo Matsumoto
- Kagetsu
- Kaneko Natsuho
- Kaoru Ito
- Kazuki
- Mikoto Shindo
- Mari Harada
- Maria
- Mei Hoshizuki
- Miyako Morino
- Mio Momono
- Natsumi Maki
- Riko Kaiju
- Rin Kadokura
- Rydeen Hagane
- Ryo Mizunami
- Sakura Hirota
- Sareee
- Sawako Shimono
- Sendai Sachiko
- Tyrannosaurus Okuda
- Syuri
- Yako Fujigasaki
- Yuu
- Yuu Yamagata

== Championships ==
As of November 6, 2026

Championship	Current champion(s)	Reign	Date won	Days held	Location	Notes
Sendai Girls World Championship	Chihiro Hashimoto	6	March 19, 2025	597+	Tokyo, Japan	Defeated Meiko Satomura at Sendai Girls The Top Of Joshi Wrestling.
Sendai Girls Tag Team Championship	Red Energy (Mika Iwata and Miyuki Takase)	2 (4, 2)	June 13, 2026	146+	Sendai, Miyagi, Japan	Defeated Manami and Ryo Mizunami at Sendai Girls SENJO 20th Anniversary Tour In Sendai PIT ~ The Sky Is The Limit ~
Sendai Girls Junior Championship	vacant	-	-	-	Tokyo, Japan	Spike Nishimura was forced to reliquish the title after reaching her eligibility point at Sendai Girls SENJO 20th Anniversary Tour In Yoyogi ~ The Top Of Joshi Wrestling ~.

== Accomplishments ==
In Sendai Girls Pro Wrestling (Senjo), the Triple Crown consists of the three titles promoted by the company. They are the Sendai Girls World Championship, the Sendai Girls Junior Championship, and the Sendai Girls Tag Team Championship. On July 16, 2023, during the Sendai Girls event, Millie McKenzie became the first Triple Crown Champion in Senjo’s history.

Text
Dates in **bold**	The date the wrestler completed the Triple Crown

Champion	Primary championship	Tag team championship	Divisional championship
Champion	Sendai Girls World Championship	Sendai Girls Tag Team Championship	Sendai Girls Junior Championship
Millie McKenzie	**July 16, 2023**	May 27, 2019 (with Charli Evans)	January 6, 2019
