= Stardom New Year Dream =

2025 World Wonder Ring Stardom event

- Promotional poster of the event
- Promotion: World Wonder Ring Stardom
- Date: January 3, 2025
- City: Tokyo, Japan
- Venue: Tokyo Garden Theater
- Attendance: 2,054

Event chronology
← Previous; Dream Queendom	Next → Wrestle Dynasty

New Year Dream chronology
← Previous; First	Next → 2026

Stardom New Year Dream (スターダム新年夢, Sutādamu shin'nen yume) was a professional wrestling event promoted by World Wonder Ring Stardom. It took place on January 3, 2025, in Tokyo, Japan at the Tokyo Garden Theater. It was the first major event organized by Stardom in 2025, and part a four-day card set around the January 4 Tokyo Dome Show which included Wrestle Kingdom 19, Wrestle Dynasty, and New Year Dash!! in the next three days after.

== Production ==
=== Background ===
On July 3, 2024, Stardom's parent company New Japan Pro-Wrestling (NJPW) announced that New Year Dream would take place on January 3, 2025.

=== Storylines ===
The show featured thirteen professional wrestling matches that result from scripted storylines, where wrestlers portray villains, heroes, or less distinguishable characters in the scripted events that build tension and culminate in a wrestling match or series of matches.

=== Event ===
The event started with three preshow bouts broadcast live on Stardom's YouTube channel. In the first one, Mizuki Kato and Yuma Makoto defeated Rian and Honoka in tag team competition, in the second one, Lady C and Nanami outmatched Saya Iida and Momo Kohgo, and in the third one, Hina and Ranna Yagami defeated Evolution's Zones and Soy.

In the first main card bout, Ring of Honor's Athena teamed up with Thekla to defeat Mina Shirakawa and All Elite Wrestling's Tay Melo. Next up, Saki Kashima defeated Yuna Mizumori, Kohaku, Waka Tsukiyama and Matoi Hamabe to become the number one contender for the High Speed Championship. In the sixth bout, Rina and Ruaka defeated Manami and Hanan in tag team competition. The seventh bout saw Chi Chi defeating Aya Sakura to secure the second consecutive defense of the Sendai Girls Junior Championship in that respective reign. Next up, Syuri, Tomoka Inaba and Kiyoka Kotatsu defeated Momo Watanabe, Fukigen Death and Azusa Inaba in six-woman tag team action. Next up, Saori Anou, Natsupoi and Sayaka Kurara picked up a victory over the team of Zap, Dump Matsumoto) and Natsuko Tora. The eleventh bout saw Maika and Hanako defeating Chihiro Hashimoto and Yuu in tag team competition. In the semi main event, Tam Nakano defeated Unagi Sayaka in a Name vs. Career match, result which officially ended Sayaka's career in Stardom after her membership status in Cosmic Angels was left hanging in the air after her departure from the company on December 29, 2022.

In the main event, Suzu Suzuki and Wonder of Stardom Champion Starlight Kid picked up a win over World of Stardom Champion Saya Kamitani and Momo Watanabe. After the bout concluded, Suzu Suzuki laid a title challenge for Kamitani.

== Results ==
No.	Results	Stipulations	Times
1^{P}	Mizuki Kato and Yuma Makoto defeated Rian and Honoka	Tag team match	9:15
2^{P}	God's Eye (Lady C and Nanami) defeated Stars (Saya Iida and Momo Kohgo)	Tag team match	7:11
3^{P}	God's Eye (Hina and Ranna Yagami) defeated Zones and Soy	Tag team match	8:19
4	Athena and Thekla defeated Mina Shirakawa and Tay Melo	Tag team match	14:21
5	Saki Kashima defeated Yuna Mizumori, Kohaku, Waka Tsukiyama and Matoi Hamabe	Five-way elimination match to determine the #1 contender to the High Speed Championship	5:10
6	H.A.T.E. (Rina and Ruaka) defeated Manami and Hanan	Tag team match	10:08
7	Chi Chi (c) defeated Aya Sakura	Singles match for the Sendai Girls Junior Championship	15:09
8	God's Eye (Syuri and Tomoka Inaba) and Kiyoka Kotatsu defeated H.A.T.E. (Momo Watanabe, Fukigen Death and Azusa Inaba)	Six-woman tag team match	7:04
9	Stars (Mayu Iwatani, Hazuki and Koguma) defeated Neo Genesis (AZM, Mei Seira and Miyu Amasaki)	Six-woman tag team match	10:43
10	Cosmic Angels (Saori Anou, Natsupoi and Sayaka Kurara) defeated Vulgar Alliance (Zap and Dump Matsumoto) and Natsuko Tora	Six-woman tag team match	6:56
11	Hai High Mate (Maika and Hanako) defeated Team 200kg (Chihiro Hashimoto and Yuu)	Tag team match	18:10
12	Tam Nakano defeated Unagi Sayaka	Name vs. Career match (Note: Since Sayaka lost, her career in Stardom was officially over (see Cosmic Angels for more information). Had Nakano lost, she would have had to give up her ring name.)	17:02
13	Neo Genesis (Suzu Suzuki and Starlight Kid) defeated H.A.T.E. (Saya Kamitani and Momo Watanabe)	Tag team match	15:43
(c) / – the champion(s) heading into the match; P / – the match was broadcast on the pre-show
