= Yurika Oka =

Japanese professional wrestler

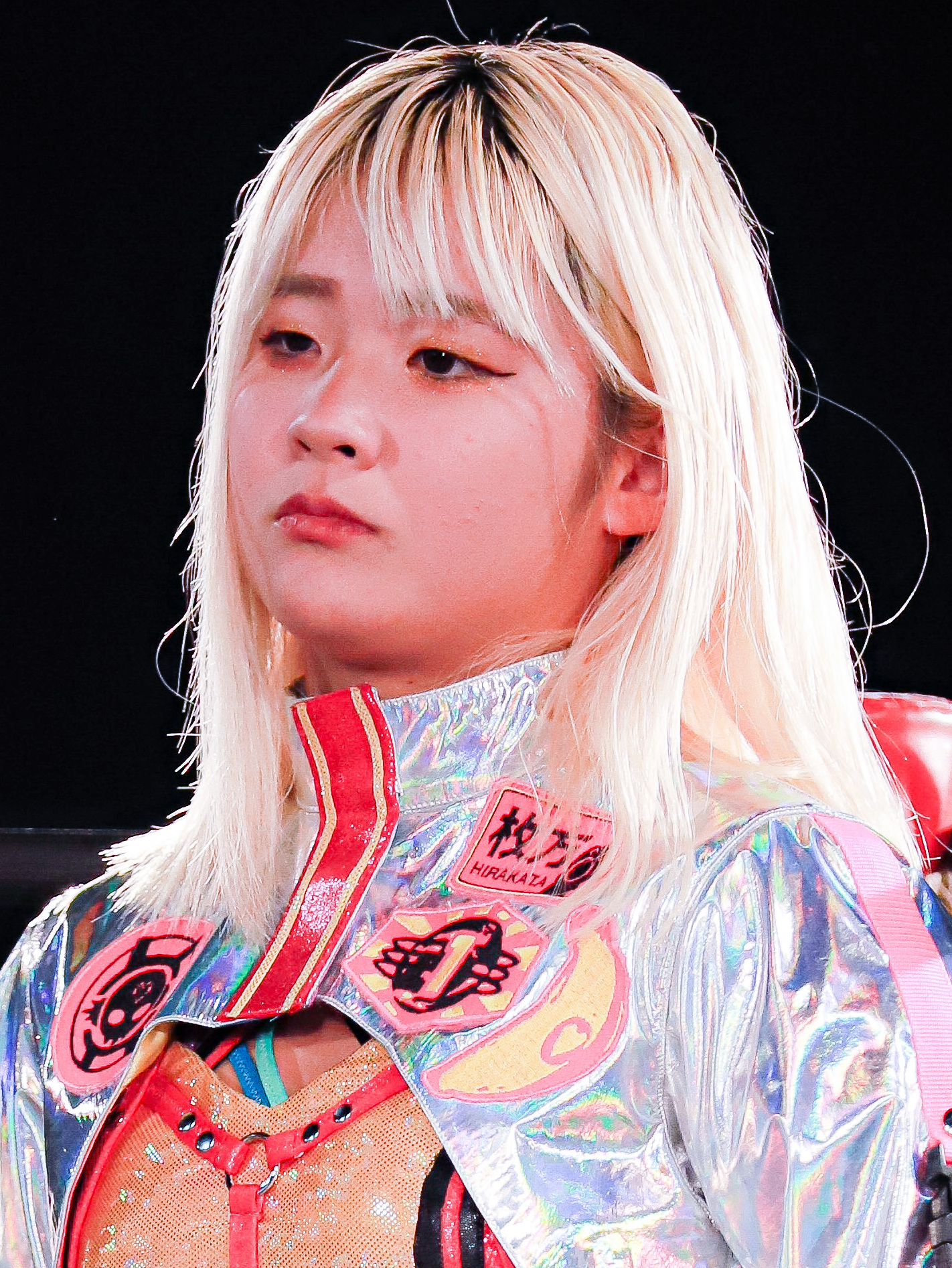
- Oka in May 2023

Personal information
- Born: October 23, 2003 (age 22) Hirakata, Osaka Prefecture, Japan

Professional wrestling career
- Ring name: Yurika Oka
- Billed height: 154 cm (5 ft 1 in)
- Billed weight: 54 kg (119 lb)
- Trained by: Meiko Satomura; Chihiro Hashimoto; Dash Chisako
- Debut: 2019

Yurika Oka (岡優里佳, Oka Yurika) is a Japanese professional wrestler currently performing the Japanese promotion Sendai Girls' Pro Wrestling where she is a former Sendai Girls Junior Champion.

== Professional wrestling career ==
=== Sendai Girls' Pro Wrestling (2019–present) ===
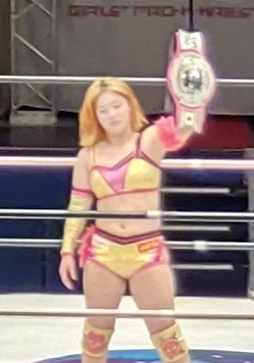
Oka as the Sendai Girls Junior Champion in January 2022

Oka is best known for her tenure with Sendai Girls' Pro Wrestling. She made her professional wrestling debut at a house show promoted on September 28, 2019, where she fell short to one of her coaches, Dash Chisako in singles competition. During her tenure with the company, she chased for various championships promoted by it. The first one was the Sendai Girls Junior Championship, title which she won for the first time at Big Show 2021 In Niigata on June 27 by defeating Mei Hoshizuki. Oka competed in one of the promotion's signature events, the Royal Tag Tournament, making her only appearance at the 2019 edition where she teamed up with Jaguar Yokota and fell short to Chikayo Nagashima and Kaoru in the second rounds from November 12. Another event in which she participated was the "Jaja Uma", a singles tournament in which she scored her best result at the 2021 edition where she defeated Madeline in the first rounds, Riko Kaiju in the semifinals but fell short to Haruka Umesaki in the finals which took place on January 9, 2022.

She also took part in many match gimmicks. At Sendai Girls Step And Go! on January 9, 2021, she competed in a battle royal won by Mika Iwata and also involving Chihiro Hashimoto, Dash Chisako, Hiroyo Matsumoto, Kanon, Manami, Mei Hoshizuki, Natsuho Kaneko and Sakura Hirota. At Sendai Girls Road To GAEAism on October 1, 2021, she competed in a tag team gauntlet match in which she teamed up with Chihiro Hashimoto, Dash Chisako, Kanon, Mika Iwata, Natsuho Kaneko as "Team Sendai" in a losing effort against "Team Marvelous" (Hibiki, Maria, Masha Slamovich, Mei Hoshizuki, Mikoto Shindo, Mio Momono and Rin Kadokura).

=== Independent scene (2019–present) ===
Due to partially working as a freelancer, Oka competed in several companies of the Japanese independent scene, mainly due to Sendai Girls' partnerships. At WAVE NAMI 1, an event promoted by Pro Wrestling Wave on September 1, 2021, she teamed up with Haruka Umesaki and Yako in a losing effort against Ozaki-gun (Maya Yukihi, Mayumi Ozaki and Yumi Ohka). At GLEAT G PROWRESTLING Ver. 18, an event promoted by Gleat on February 22, 2022, Oka teamed up with Dash Chisako to defeat Michiko Miyagi and Yukari Hosokawa. At Seadlinnng October Fist! on October 19, 2022, she competed in a three-way match won by Kaori Yoneyama and also involving Kakeru Sekiguchi. At Tenryu Project Tenryu Festival on February 12, 2023, Oka teamed up with Kohei Sato to defeat Mika Iwata and Sushi in a mixed tag team match.

==== Marvelous That's Women Pro Wrestling (2021–present) ====
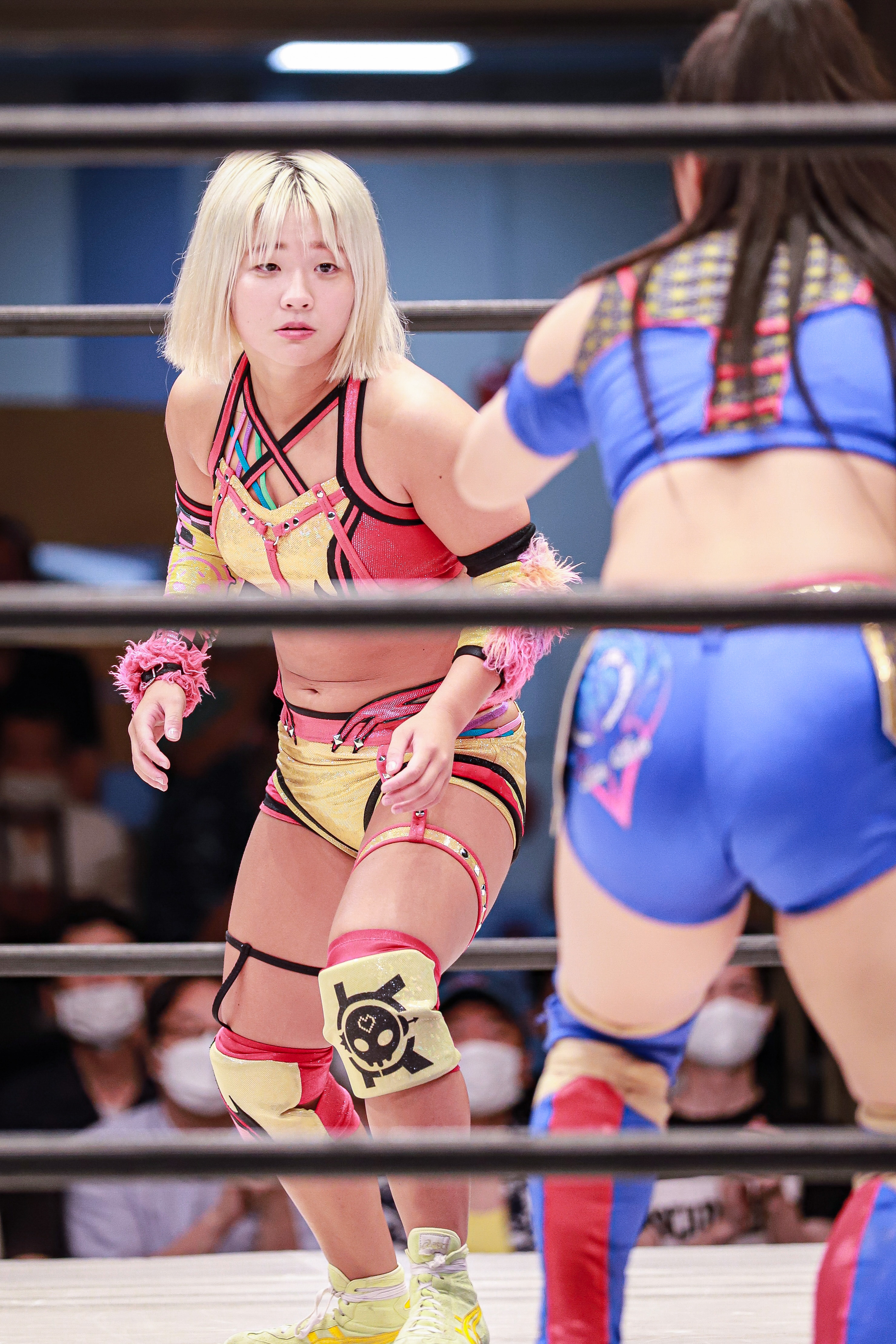
Oka in 2023

Oka often competed in matches promoted by Marvelous That's Women Pro Wrestling. She made her first appearance atMarvelous Road To GAEAism on January 12, 2021, where she teamed up with Manami and Natsuho Kaneko to defeat Hibiki, Maria and Mikoto Shindo in a six-woman tag team match. She participated in one of the promotion's signature events, a one-day tag team tournament from October 27, 2021, in which she teamed up with Ai Houzan and went into a time-limit draw against Nagisa Nozaki and Takumi Iroha, just to lose against them in a rematch later the same night. Oka teamed up with Houzan in a league to determinate the next champions of the reactivated AAAW Tag Team Championship. They scored a total of two points after drawing up against Riko Kawahata and Yuki Miyazaki, and then falling short to Itsuki Aoki and Rin Kadokura.

== Championships and accomplishments ==
- Marvelous That's Women Pro Wrestling
  - AAAW Tag Team Championship (1 time) – with Mio Momono
- Sendai Girls' Pro Wrestling
  - Sendai Girls Tag Team Championship (3 times) – with Mio Momono
  - Sendai Girls Junior Championship (1 time)
