= Yuna (wrestler) =

Japanese wrestler (born 2004)

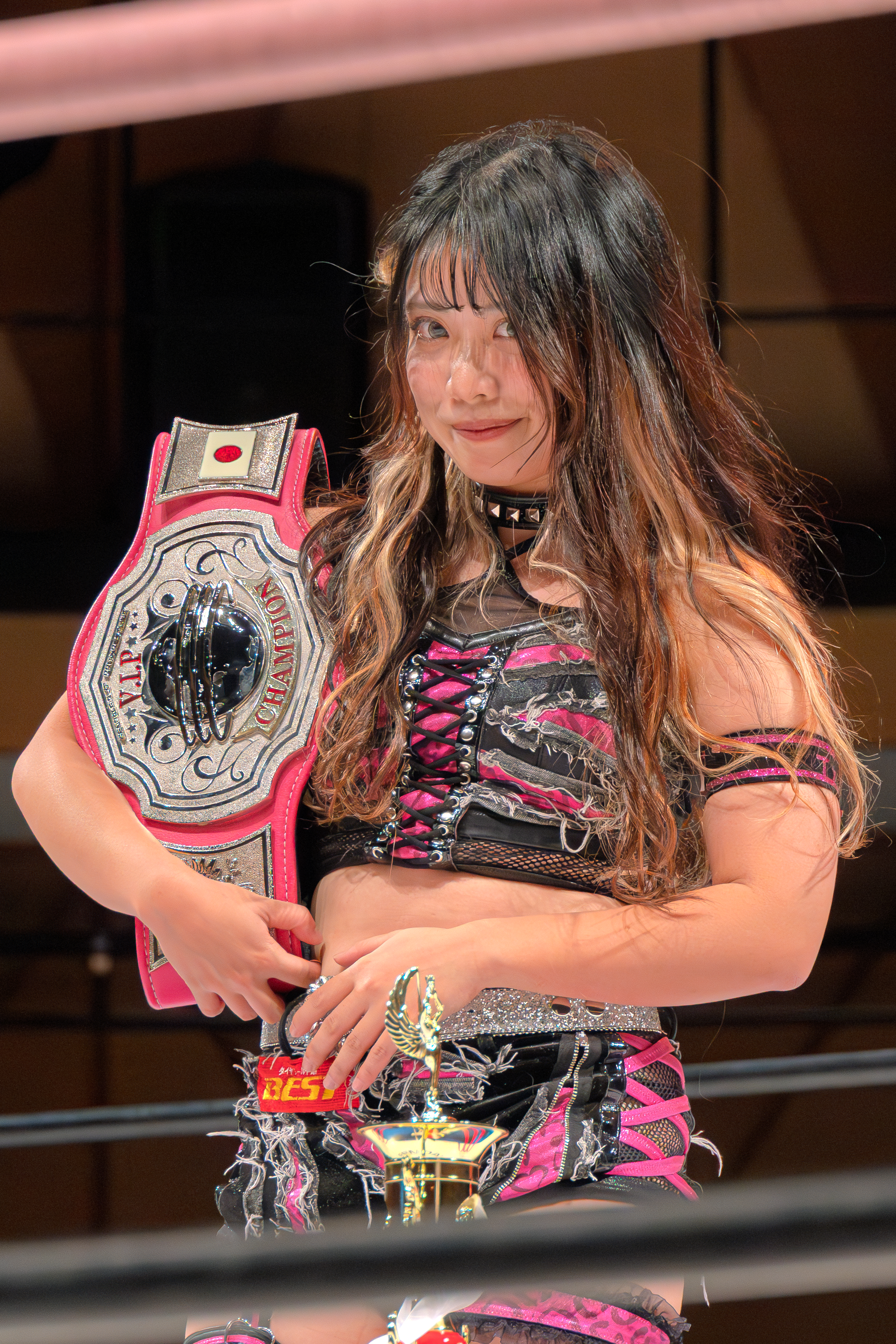
- Yuna in November 2025

Personal information
- Born: 19 April 2004 (age 22) Ōgawara, Japan

Professional wrestling career
- Ring name: Yuna
- Billed height: 155 cm (5 ft 1 in)
- Billed weight: 53 kg (117 lb)
- Trained by: Chihiro Hashimoto
- Debut: 2023

Yuna (ゆな, Yuna) (sometimes stylized in capital letters as YUNA) is a Japanese professional wrestler signed to Sendai Girls' Pro Wrestling where she a former Sendai Girls Junior Champion. She also works for various other promotions from the Japanese independent scene.

== Professional wrestling career ==
=== Japanese independent circuit (2024–present) ===
At the 2024 edition of Pro Wrestling Wave's Catch the Wave tournament, Yuna placed herself in the A block where she scored a total of three points after competing against Honoka, Sya and Yuzuki, failing to qualify for the semifinals. At Marigold First Dream 2025 from January 3, an event promoted by Dream Star Fighting Marigold, Yuna teamed up with Meiko Satomura in a losing effort against The Passion Sisters (Nanae Takahashi and Nao Ishikawa).

At Stardom New Blood 16, an event promoted by World Wonder Ring Stardom on October 19, 2024, she teamed up with Spike Nishimura in a losing effort against Neo Genesis (Starlight Kid and Miyu Amasaki). Yuna competed for the first time in a Stardom main pay-per-view at Stardom Year-End X'Mas Night 2025 on December 24, where she teamed up with Chihiro Hashimoto, Yuu and Manami in a losing effort against Empress Nexus Venus (Hanako and Maika and God's Eye (Ranna Yagami and Syuri).

=== Sendai Girls' Pro Wrestling (2023–present) ===
Yuna made her professional wrestling debut in Sendai Girls' Pro Wrestling at a house show from August 9, 2023, where she wrestled an also debuting Rea Marumori into a time-limit draw. During her time with the promotion, she chased for various accomplishments. At Senjo The Biggest on August 24, 2025, she defeated Aya Sakura to win the first title of her career, the Sendai Girls Junior Championship.

Yuna competed in one of the promotion's signature events, the Jaja Uma tournament, in which she scored her best result at the 2024 edition where she defeated Miria Koga in the second rounds, then fell short to Aya Sakura in the semifinals.

== Championships and accomplishments ==
- Sendai Girls' Pro Wrestling
  - Sendai Girls Junior Championship (1 time)
