= Aya Sakura =

Japanese professional wrestler (born 1996)

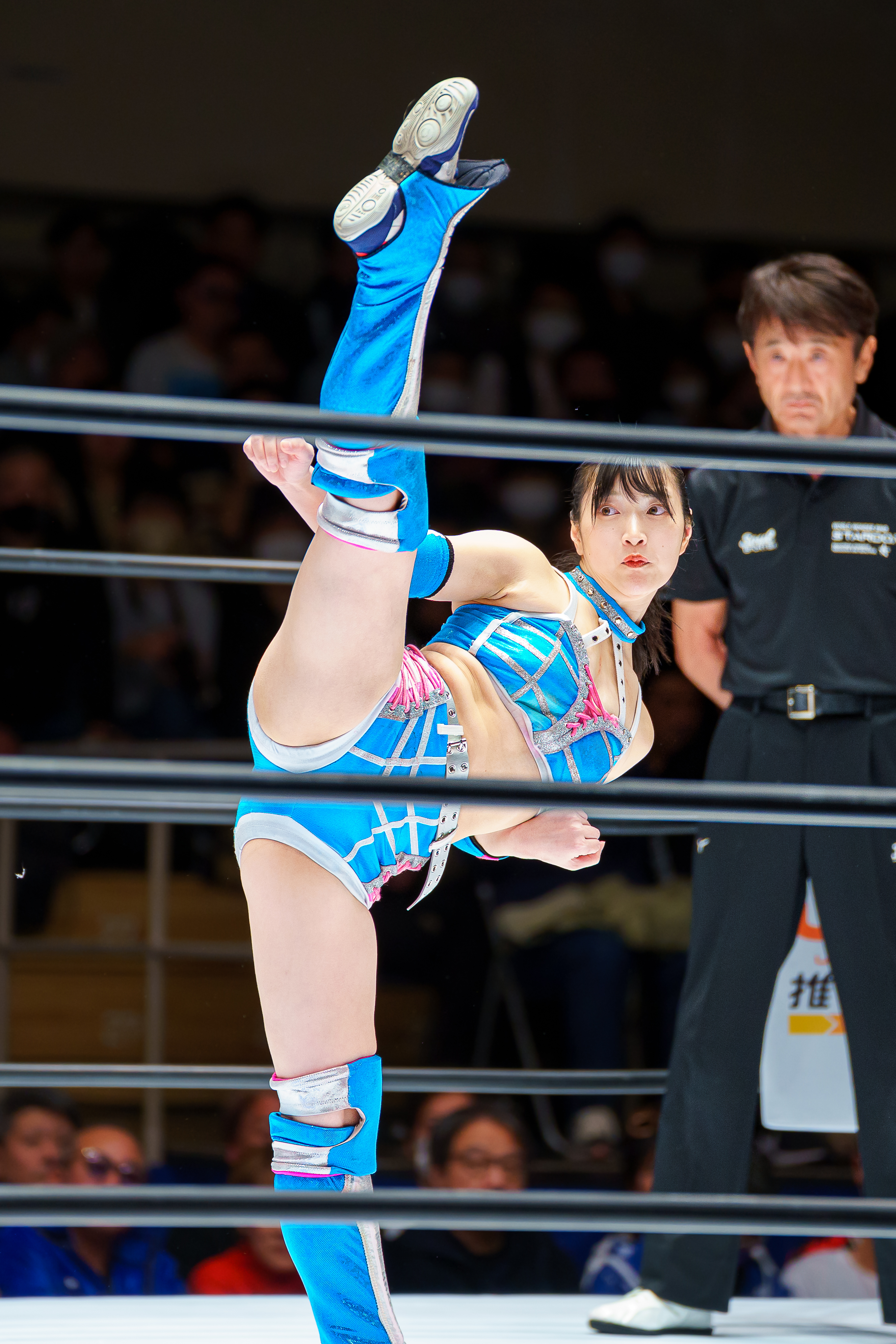
- Sakura in January 2025

Personal information
- Born: September 13, 1996 (age 30) Kobe, Japan

Professional wrestling career
- Ring name: Aya Sakura
- Billed height: 158 cm (5 ft 2 in)
- Billed weight: 52 kg (115 lb)
- Trained by: Tam Nakano
- Debut: 2023

Sakura Ishiguro (石黒さくら, Ishiguro Sakura; born September 13, 1996), better known by her ring name Aya Sakura (さくら あや, Sakura Aya), is a Japanese professional wrestler. She works for World Wonder Ring Stardom, where she is the second leader of Cosmic Angels. She is also known for her appearance in Sendai Girls' Pro Wrestling, where she is a former Sendai Girls Junior Champion.

== Professional wrestling career ==
=== World Wonder Ring Stardom (2023–present) ===
Sakura made her official in-ring debut at New Blood Premium on March 25, 2023, where she faced Giulia. Sakura had a long-term withdrawal due to a neck injury since July 9, 2023.

Sakura returned on March 10, 2024. Sakura faced Sayaka Kurara in a time-limit draw on March 30, 2024.

==== Cosmic Angels (2024-present) ====
Sakura officially joined the Cosmic Angels with Kurara after passing the final assessment on April 12, 2024. Sakura and Kurara defeated Oedo Tai (Rina and Ruaka) on September 8, 2024.

Sakura unsuccessfully challenged Rina for the Future of Stardom Championship at New Blood 15 on September 29, 2024. At Stardom New Year Dream, Sakura unsuccessfully challenged Chi Chi for the Sendai Girls Junior Championship on January 3, 2025. On March 8, 2025, Sakura went through a time-limit draw with Hanako in the Stardom Cinderella Tournament 2025, which eliminated both from the tournament. At Historic X-Over in Guangzhou, Sakura would face her again with the Future of Stardom Championship on the line, but was unsuccessful. Sakurara (Sakura and Kurara) won the New Blood Tag Team Championship by defeating Rice or Bread (Waka Tsukiyama and Hanako) at Stardom New Blood 26 on October 30, 2025. On November 30, 2025, Sakura won the Goddesses of Stardom Tag League with Kurara after defeating BMI2000 (Natsuko Tora and Ruaka) in the finals.

Sakurara (Sakura and Kurara) defeats Yuna Mizumori and Anne Kanaya to retain their titles at Stardom New Blood 28 on February 2, 2026. At Stardom New Blood 30, Sakura would lose against Ranna Yagami for the Future of Stardom Championship, which would be her last and final challenge for the belt. On July 2, 2026, Sakura challenged Maki Itoh for the Kawaii of Kawaii Championship. After a fierce back-and-forth battle she was trapped in her opponent's trademark Itoh Special (Texas Cloverleaf) finishing hold and was forced to submit; resulting in Itoh's retention of the championship belt.

=== Sendai Girls’ Pro Wrestling (2024–present) ===
Sakura participated in the Jaja Uma Tournament 2024 and won against Yuzuki in the quarterfinals, Yuna in the semifinals, but lost against Chi Chi in the finals.

Sakura defeated Chi Chi to win the Sendai Girls Junior Championship on March 19, 2025. Sakura lost the Sendai Girls Junior Championship against Yuna at Senjo The Biggest on August 24, 2025, ending her reign at 158 days.

== Championships and accomplishments ==
- Pro Wrestling Illustrated
  - Ranked No. 151 of the top 250 female wrestlers in the PWI Women's 250 in 2025
- Sendai Girls' Pro Wrestling
  - Sendai Girls Junior Championship (1 time)
- World Wonder Ring Stardom
  - New Blood Tag Team Championship (1 time) - with Sayaka Kurara
  - Goddesses of Stardom Tag League (2025) – with Sayaka Kurara
  - Stardom Year-End Awards (1 time)
    - Best Unit Award (2024) as part of Cosmic Angels
