= Cosmic Angels =

Professional wrestling stable

- Cosmic Angels official logo since 2020

Stable
- Leader(s): Sayaka Kurara; Aya Sakura
- Members: Natsupoi; Saori Anou; Yuna Mizumori; Anne Kanaya
- Former members: See below
- Debut: November 14, 2020
- Years active: 2020–present

Cosmic Angels (コズミックエンジェルズ, Kozumikkuenjeruzu) is a professional wrestling stable, currently performing in the Japanese professional wrestling promotion World Wonder Ring Stardom. Led by Sayaka Kurara and Aya Sakura, the stable also consists of Natsupoi, Saori Anou, Yuna Mizumori and Anne Kanaya. They are often known by their catchphrase "We are and you are, delicious!" (私たちは、あなたはデリシャスです, Watashitachiha, anata wa derishasu desu).

== History ==
=== Formation ===
The stable initially debuted as a sub-group of the Stars stable led by Mayu Iwatani on November 14, 2020, after Tam Nakano brought Mina Shirakawa from Tokyo Joshi Pro Wrestling, teaming up with her to defeat Iwatani and Starlight Kid, subsequently convincing Iwatani to accept Shirakawa in the stable. Shortly after Shirakawa joining the Stardom, Nakano recruited Unagi Sayaka into the sub-group who also came from TJPW. At Stardom Sendai Cinderella 2020 on November 15, Nakano, Sayaka and Shirakawa defeated Natsuko Tora, Rina and Saki Kashima. Tam Nakano, Mina Shirakawa and Unagi Sayaka teamed up on December 16, 2020, at Road to Osaka Dream Cinderella to defeat Oedo Tai's Bea Priestley, Natsuko Tora and Saki Kashima for the Artist of Stardom Championship. Four days later, Nakano explained that the three of them peacefully parted ways with Stars and started acting as an independent unit ever since.

=== Tam Nakano's leadership (2020–2025) ===
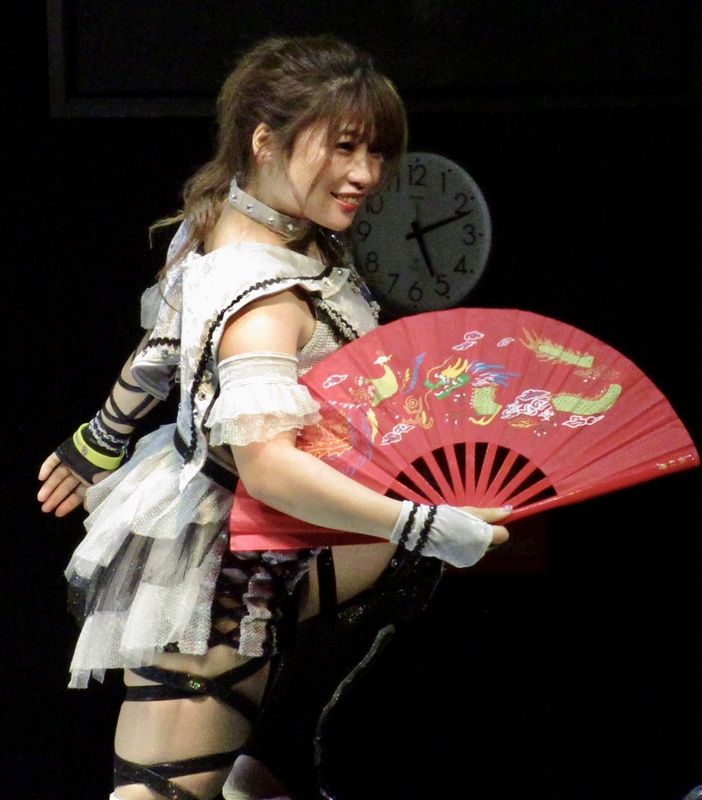
The first leader of the stable, Tam Nakano

At Stardom All Star Dream Cinderella on March 3, 2021, Tam Nakano defeated Giulia in a Hair vs. Hair match to win the Wonder of Stardom Championship. At Yokohama Dream Cinderella 2021 in Summer on July 4, Mina Shirakawa defeated Unagi Sayaka in the finals of a tournament to win the vacant Future of Stardom Championship. On the sixth night of the 2021 5Star Grand Prix which took place in the Korakuen Hall on August 13, after losing the Future of Stardom Championship match to Unagi Sayaka, Mai Sakurai was presented as the newest member of Cosmic Angels and was announced to undergo a newcomer "challenge" against ten opponents during the tournament. On the ninth night from September 4 it was revealed that Waka Tsukiyama from Actwres girl'Z would make her debut in Stardom. Just as Mai Sakurai, she was announced to undergo a rookie "challenge" against ten different opponents. On September 28, Stardom held the press conference for the Stardom 10th Anniversary Grand Final Osaka Dream Cinderella event which they broadcast live on their YouTube channel. While holding her speech for her match pairing with Lady C against Oedo Tai's Saki Kashima and Rina, Waka Tsukiyama called out Tam Nakano and requested her and the other Cosmic Angels members to join their unit which they accepted. Nakano, Shirakawa and Sayaka dropped the Artist of Stardom Championship to Maika, Natsupoi and Himeka at Stardom in Nagoya from October 3, 2021, after keeping the titles for 291 consecutive days making them the longest reigning champions till date. At Stardom 10th Anniversary Grand Final Osaka Dream Cinderella on October 9, 2021, Ruaka defeated Unagi Sayaka to win the Future of Stardom Championship. At Kawasaki Super Wars, the first event of the Stardom Super Wars trilogy which took place on November 3, Mai Sakurai defeated Waka Tsukiyama to stay in Cosmic Angels. At Tokyo Super Wars on November 27, Tam Nakano successfully defended her Wonder of Stardom Championship against Mina Shirakawa, making peace with her and ending any other grudge between the stable members. At Osaka Super Wars, the last event from the trilogy from December 18, Tam Nakano, Mina Shirakawa and Unagi Sayaka fell short to Stars (Mayu Iwatani, Hazuki and Koguma) in a Six-woman tag team match ¥10 Million Unit Tournament semi-final. At Stardom Dream Queendom on December 29, Mina Shirakawa, Unagi Sayaka and Mai Sakurai unsuccessfully challenged MaiHimePoi (Maika, Natsupoi and Himeka) for the Artist of Stardom Championship, and Tam Nakano dropped the Wonder of Stardom Championship to Saya Kamitani having her reign ended at 301 days.

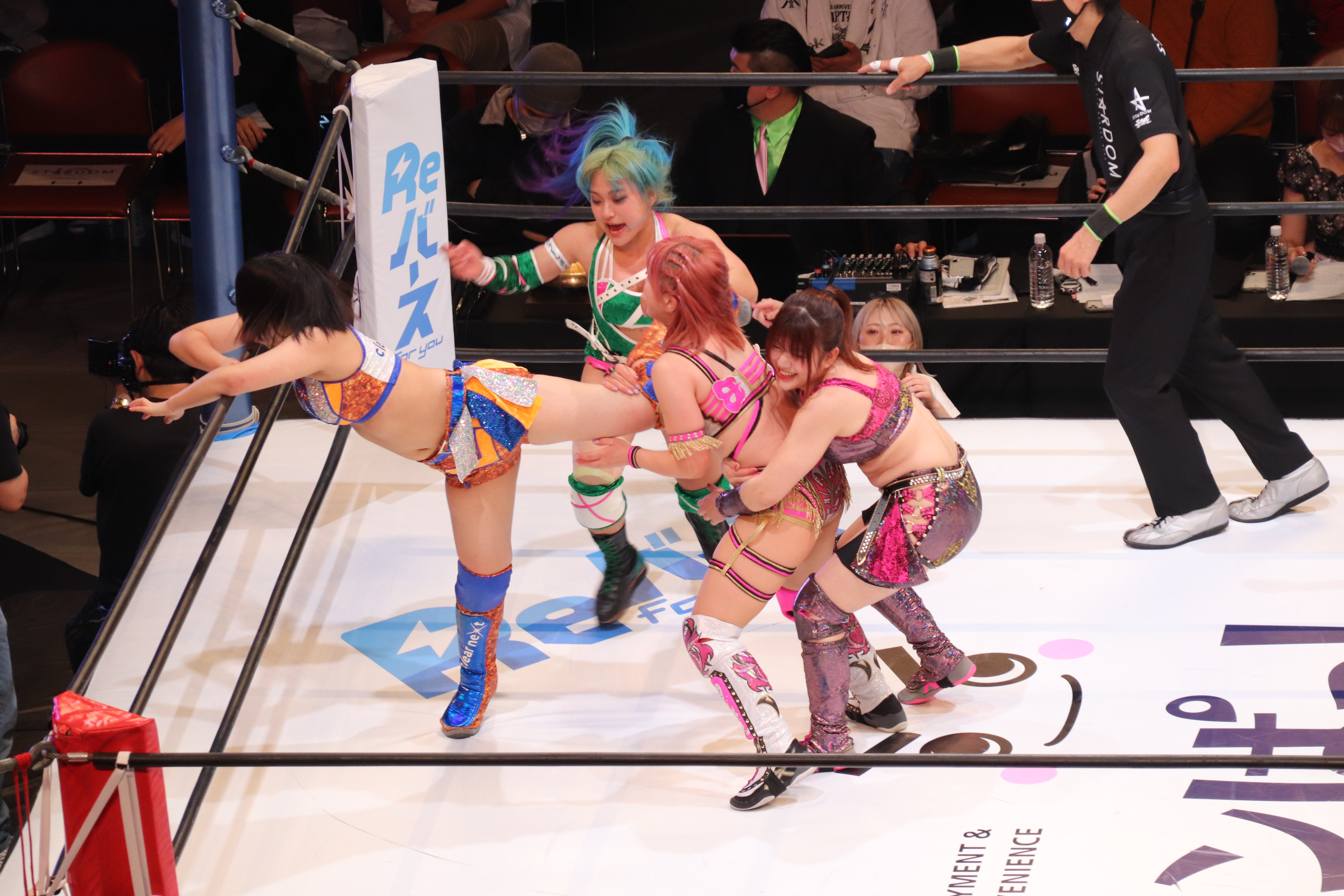
Mina Shirakawa (center) during a battle royal at Stardom World Climax 2022.

At Stardom Nagoya Supreme Fight on January 29, 2022, Mai Sakurai, Waka Tsukiyama and Tam Nakano were not eligible to compete due to bad health condition, Mina Shirakawa unsuccessfully battled Thekla for the vacant SWA World Championship and Unagi Sayaka unsuccessfully challenged Saya Kamitani for the Wonder of Stardom Championship. At Stardom in Osaka on February 12, 2021, Tam Nakano, Unagi Sayaka and Mai Sakurai fell short to Giulia, Thekla and Mirai in a six-woman tag team match. After months of Giulia asking Sakurai if she wants to be stronger, Sakurai told Nakano “I don't want to dance, I want to wrestle” and joined Donna Del Mondo. At Stardom Cinderella Journey on February 23, 2022, Waka Tsukiyama unsuccessfully faced Rina and Mai Sakurai in a three-way number one's contendership match for the Future of Stardom Championship, Mina Shirakawa and Unagi Sayaka unsuccessfully faced FWC (Hazuki and Koguma) for the Goddesses of Stardom Championship and Tam Nakano teamed up with Mayu Iwatani to defeat Oedo Tai's Fukigen Death and Saki Kashima. At Stardom New Blood 1 on March 11, 2022, Unagi Sayaka and Waka Tsukiyama fell short to Marvelous' Maria and Ai Houzan. On the first night of the Stardom World Climax 2022 from March 26, Waka Tsukiyama and Mina Shirakawa teamed with Momo Kohgo to unsuccessfully compete in a six-woman tag team gauntlet match, and Tam Nakano alongside Unagi Sayaka unsuccessfully faced Mayu Iwatani and a returning Kairi. On the second night from March 27, Unagi Sayaka, Mina Shirakawa and Waka Tsukiyama participated in a 18-women Cinderella Rumble match won by Mei Suruga and also involving other opponents from both Stardom and the independent scene such as Tomoka Inaba, Haruka Umesaki, Nanami, Maria, Ai Houzan, and Yuna Mizumori. In the main event, Tam Nakano failed to recapture the Wonder of Stardom Championship from Saya Kamitani. At Stardom Cinderella Tournament 2022, all members participated with Unagi Sayaka scoring the best result as she made it to the second rounds on April 10. At Stardom Golden Week Fight Tour on May 5, 2022, Tam Nakano, Mina Shirakawa and Unagi Sayaka defeated Queen's Quest (Utami Hayashishita, AZM and Lady C) in a six-woman tag team match. At Stardom Flashing Champions on May 28, 2022, Mina Shirakawa, Unagi Sayaka and Waka Tsukiyama fell short to Prominence (Suzu Suzuki, Akane Fujita and Mochi Natsumi) and Tam Nakano teamed up with Kairi to defeat Utami Hayashishita and Miyu Amasaki.

At Stardom in Korakuen Hall on June 5, 2022, Unagi Sayaka, Tam Nakano and Mina Shirakawa defeated Color's (Saki, Hikari Shimizu and Yuko Sakurai) in a loser joins enemy unit. The three announced that they will compete as a sub-unit in the future, and Rina Amikura was also reported to have joined Angels due to being part of Color's at that time.

At Stardom Fight in the Top on June 26, 2022, Unagi Sayaka and Waka Tsukiyama fell short to Ruaka in a three-way match, Mina Shirakawa unsuccessfully challenged Himeka, and Tam Nakano picked a victory over Natsupoi in one of the first ever steel cage matches ever promoted by Stardom. At Stardom New Blood 3 on July 8, 2022, Waka Tsukiyama fell short to Ram Kaicho and Unagi Sayaka, Mina Shirakawa, Yuko Sakurai and Rina Amikura fell short to Starlight Kid, Ruaka, Rina and Haruka Umesaki. At Mid Summer Champions in Tokyo, the first event of the Stardom Mid Summer Champions which took place on July 9, 2022, Tam Nakano, Unagi Sayaka, Mina Shirakawa, Saki and Hikari Shimizu challenged Giulia, Maika, Himeka, Natsupoi and Mai Sakurai in an elimination tag team match. Natsupoi betrayed Donna Del Mondo by attacking Giulia mid-match, attracting Donna Del Mondo's loss. Natsupoi subsequently joined Cosmic Angels in the process. At Stardom in Showcase vol.1 on July 23, 2022, Unagi Sayaka, Mina Shirakawa and Saki brawled into a no contest as a result of a comedic "Cosmic rules" match, and Tam Nakano took part into a four-way falls count anywhere match won by AZM and also involving Koguma and Momo Watanabe. At Mid Summer Champions in Tokyo, the first event of the Stardom Mid Summer Champions which took place on July 9, 2022, Yuko Sakurai fought in a three-way match won by Lady C and also involving Hina, Waka Tsukiyama unsuccessfully challenged Hanan for the Future of Stardom Championship, and Tam Nakano, Unagi Sayaka, Mina Shirakawa, Saki and Hikari Shimizu teamed up to defeat Donna Del Mondo's Giulia, Maika, Himeka, Natsupoi and Mai Sakurai in an elimination match. At Mid Summer Champions in Nagoya on July 24, Rina Amikura teamed up with Mai Sakurai to fall short to Hanan and Saya Iida, Mina Shirakawa, Unagi Sayaka & Hikari Shimizu unsuccessfully competed in a three-way tag team match won by Prominence (Risa Sera, Hiragi Kurumi and Suzu Suzuki), and also involving Lady C, Hina and Miyu Amasaki, Saki unsuccessfully challenged Saya Kamitani for the Wonder of Stardom Championship, and Tam Nakano unsuccessfully challenged Syuri for the World of Stardom Championship. At Stardom x Stardom: Nagoya Midsummer Encounter on August 21, 2022, Mina Shirakawa, Unagi Sayaka and Saki unsuccessfully challenged Saki Kashima, Momo Watanabe and Starlight Kid for the Artist of Stardom Championship, but Tam Nakano and Natsupoi succeeded in defeating Hazuki and Koguma to capture the Goddesses of Stardom Championship. At Stardom New Blood 4 on August 26, 2022, Waka Tsukiyama teamed up with Momoka Hanazono in a losing effort against Ram Kaicho and Rina, and Tam Nakano defeated Miyu Amasaki in the main event. At Stardom in Showcase vol.2 on September 25, 2022, the teams of Tam Nakano & Natsupoi and Saki & Hikari Shimizu defeated the team of Mina Shirakawa and Unagi Sayaka by disqualification as a result of a Cosmic Rule Three-Way Match. On October 3, 2022, Unagi Sayaka announced she was leaving Stardom to become a free agent. She also stated that she would not be leaving Cosmic Angels. At Stardom New Blood 5 on October 19, 2022, Mina Shirakawa and Waka Tsukiyama teamed up with Yuna Mizumori in a losing effort against Rina, Ram Kaicho and Linda. At Hiroshima Goddess Festival on November 3, 2022, Waka Tsukiyama unsuccessfully competed in a five-way match against AZM, Lady C, Miyu Amasaki and Saya Iida, Tam Nakano and Natsupoi successfully defended the Goddesses of Stardom Championship against Momo Watanabe and Starlight Kid, and Mina Shirakawa unsuccessfully challenged Saya Kamitani for the Wonder of Stardom Championship. At Stardom Gold Rush on November 19, 2022, Tam Nakano, Natsupoi and Waka Tsukiyama unsuccessfully challenged Giulia, Thekla and Mai Sakurai in the first rounds of a "Moneyball tournament". At Stardom in Showcase vol.3 on November 26, 2022, Tam Nakano, Natsupoi and a brief returning Unagi Sayaka fell short to Prominence's Suzu Suzuki, Risa Sera and Hiragi Kurumi in a hardcore tag team match.

At Stardom Dream Queendom 2 on December 29, 2022, Saki and Waka Tsukiyama competed in a Stardom rambo, Hikari Shimizu unsuccessfully challenged AZM for the High Speed Championship, Unagi Sayaka and Mina Shirakawa returned each and defeated Thekla and Mai Sakurai. After the match, Shirakawa slapped Unagi and together with Xia Brookside and Mariah May she formed a new sub-unit named "Club Venus, later Mina confirmed that she remained Cosmic Angels member, only that she ended her "Pink Kabuki" tag team tenure with Sayaka. Tam Nakano and Natsupoi dropped the Goddesses of Stardom Championship to 7Upp (Nanae Takahashi and Yuu).

At Stardom New Blood 7 on January 20, 2023, Waka Tsukiyama fell short to Nanae Takahashi. At Stardom Supreme Fight 2023 on February 4, 2023, Tam Nakano, Waka Tsukiyama and Natsupoi competed in a call your shot match for a title of choice. At Stardom Supreme Fight 2023 on February 4, Waka Tsukiyama, Tam Nakano, Mina Shirakawa and Natsupoi unsuccessfully competed in a Naniwa Roulette Single Elimination Tournament to determine the #1 contender to any Stardom championship. At Stardom in Showcase vol.4 on February 26, 2023, Tam Nakano and Natsupoi and Saki defeated Waka Tsukiyama and Club Venus (Mina Shirakawa and Mariah May) in a Captain's fall six-woman elimination tag team match. In the Triangle Derby I, Tam Nakano, Natsupoi and Saki were the members of the unit who scored the best result as they made it to the semifinals after running up their respective block, where they fell short to Abarenbo GE (Syuri, Mirai and Ami Sourei). At Stardom New Blood Premium on March 25, 2023, Tam Nakano and Waka Tsukiyama defeated Nanae Takahashi and Kairi, with Tsukiyama's almost two-year long losing streak coming to an end after being put under pressure by Nakano to finally get a win or she had to leave Stardom and subsequently Cosmic Angels. At Stardom x Stardom: Osaka Summer Team on August 13, Anou and Natsupoi won the Goddesses of Stardom Championship by defeating Rose Gold.

In the 2023 edition of the Cinderella Tournament, Tam Nakano, Mina Shirakawa and Waka Tsukiyama were the only competitors from behalf the unit. Tsukiyama made in the farthest, reaching the semifinals where she fell short to Mai Sakurai. On the tournament finals day from April 15, Mina Shirakawa announced that Club Venus would act as an independent unit. On the same night, Waka Tsukiyama was given the opportunity to choose between staying in the unit and defecting to Club Venus, with the latter being her final decision. After going down to significantly fewer members, Cosmic Angels was saved by Saori Anou who stepped up and joined the unit. On April 23, 2023, at All Star Grand Queendom, Anou alongside Kairi and Natsupoi defeated Prominence (Hiragi Kurumi, Risa Sera and Suzu Suzuki) to win the Artist of Stardom Championship, meanwhile, Nakano won the World of Stardom Championship from Giulia. On May 27, at Flashing Champions, REStart lost their title to the Baribari Bombers (Giulia, Mai Sakurai and Thekla), ending their reign at 34 days. At Stardom x Stardom: Osaka Summer Team on August 13, Anou and Natsupoi won the Goddesses of Stardom Championship by defeating Rose Gold. At New Blood 11, Yuna Mizumori would officially join the stable after her match against Nakano. At Dream Queendom 2023, Anou won the Wonder of Stardom Championship by defeating Mirai.

On April 24, 2024, Sayaka Kurara and Aya Sakura passed their final assessment match and became official members of the stable. On The Conversion, Anou would lost her title to Mika Iwata, ending her reign at 176 days. Anou would win the title back from Iwata 23 days later, along with winning the Sendai Girls World Championship on July 15, 2024. On July 27, 2024, Anou would drop the title to her stablemate, Natsupoi, ending her reign at 12 days. Nakano got granted a shot at the World of Stardom Championship from Natsuko Tora after failing to advance in the tournament. On August 31, 2024, Nakano was victorious in capturing the World of Stardom Championship from Tora. On Stardom Dream Queendom 2024, Natsupoi would drop her title to Kid, ending her reign at 155 days and Nakano would drop her title to Kamitani, ending her reign at 120 days. On March 15, 2025, Kurara won the Stardom Cinderella Tournament 2025 after defeating Rina in the final, but kept her wish a secret.

=== Post Tam Nakano era (2025–2026) ===
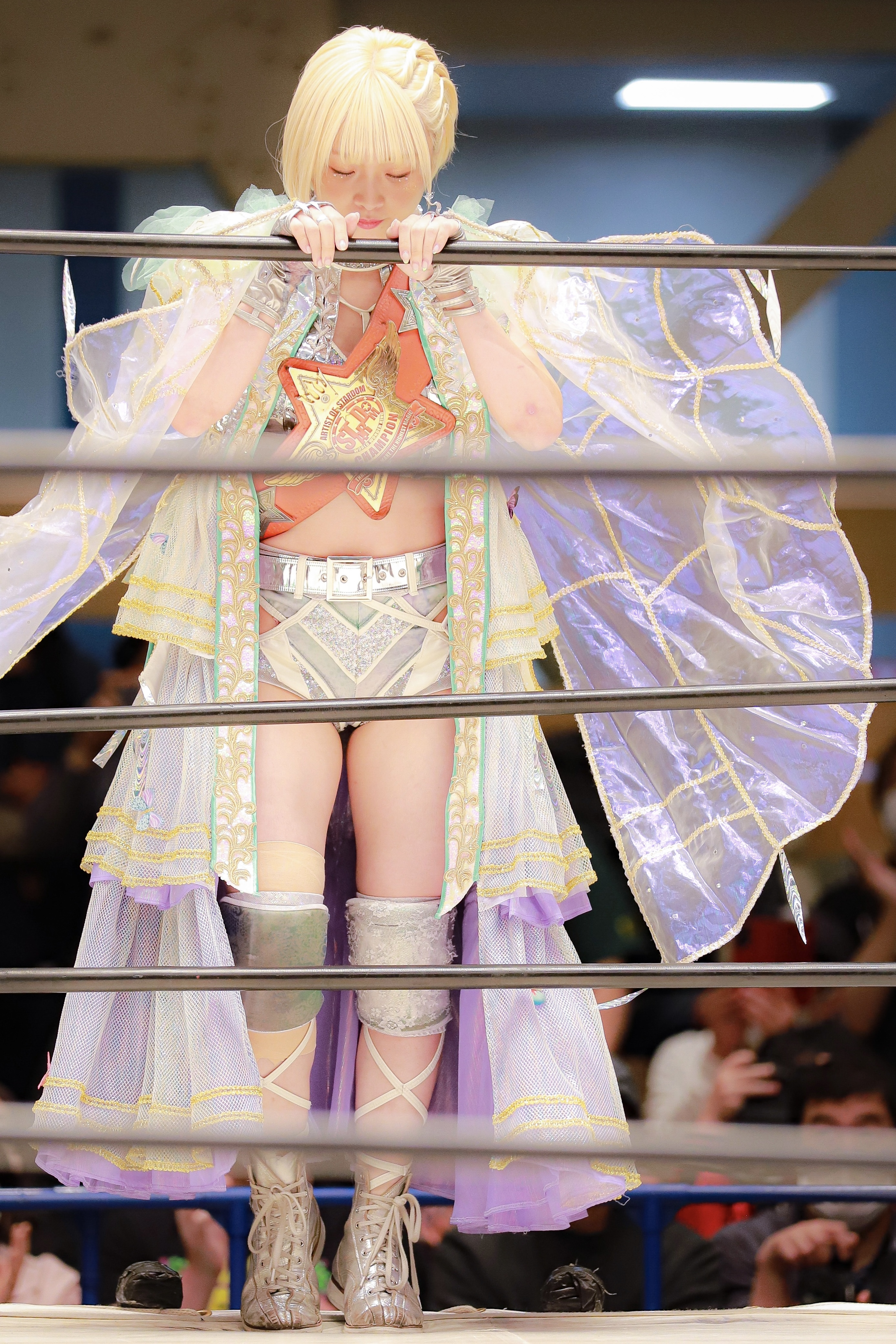
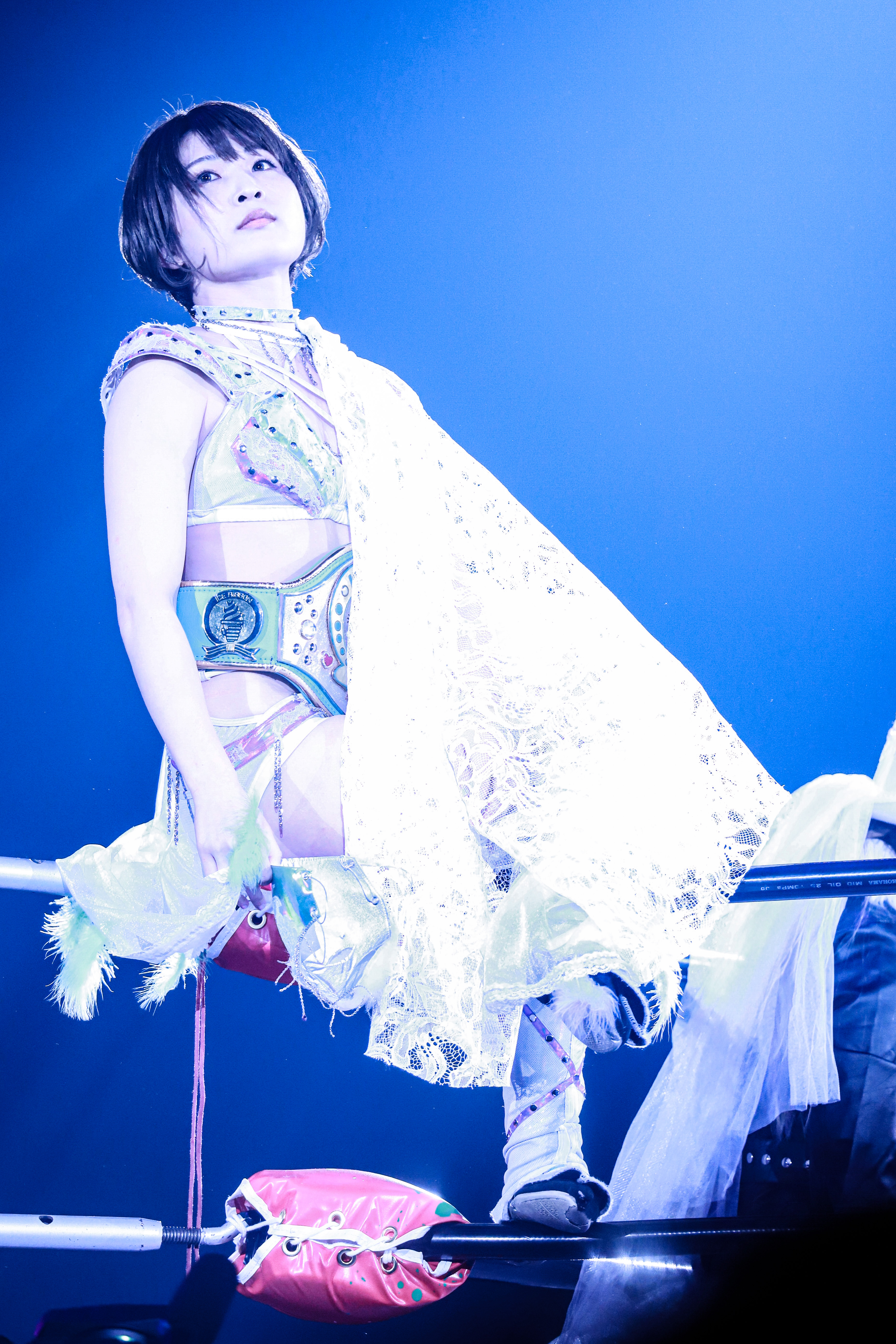
The assumed defacto leaders, Natsupoi (left) and Saori Anou (right) during the Post Tam Nakano era.

On March 4, 2025, Tam's contract with STARDOM expired, although she was still allowed to work as a freelancer. On April 27 at All Star Grand Queendom, Nakano lost a Career vs. Career match for the World of Stardom Championship to champion Saya Kamitani, thus retiring from professional wrestling. On May 10, 2025, Kurara used her Cinderella wish to challenge Saya Kamitani for the World of Stardom Championship at Korakuen Hall, but was unsuccessful. On June 21, 2025, Natsupoi and Anou unsuccessfully challenged wing★gori (Hanan and Saya Iida) for the Goddesses of Stardom Championship. After the match ended, Mizumori came out and challenged for the championships with her tag partner, SAKI. On June 25, 2025, Tropikawild (SAKI and Yuna Mizumori) would fail to capture the titles from Iida and Hanan. At Stardom Sapporo World Rendezvous 2025, Kurara, Anou, and Natsupoi all lost their championship matches for the Future of Stardom Championship, Wonder of Stardom Championship, and the World of Stardom Championship. On July 9, 2025, it was revealed that Natsupoi, Saori, Mizumori, Aya, and Sayaka would all participate in the Stardom 5 Star Grand Prix 2025 (Red Stars B, Blue Stars A, Red Stars A, Blue Stars A, and Red Stars B Block respectively). Natsupoi and Saori both advanced out of their block as winners with records of 5—2 (10 points) and 5—1—1 (11 points) respectively and thus, qualified directly to the quarterfinals, while Mizumori, Sakura and Kurara didn't advance out of their blocks with records of 2—5 (4 points). Both Natsupoi (Quarterfinals) and Saori (Semifinals) were knocked out of the tournament by Rina and Momo Watanabe respectively. From November 7 till November 30, Sakurara (Aya and Sayaka) and SaoriPoi (Natsupoi and Saori) participated in the 2025 Goddesses of Stardom Tag League, with SaoriPoi eliminated from the Red Goddess Block on tiebreak (8 points; 4–3 record) and Sakurara advancing out of the Blue Goddess Block on head-to-head record (8 points; 4-3 record); Sakurara defeated Gorilla Trigger (Saya Iida and Bea Priestley) in the quarterfinals, Mega Skyscrapers (Hanako and Megan Bayne) in the semifinals, and BMI2000 (Tora and Ruaka) in the finals. Afterwards, Kurara and Sakura would lose against Tora and Ruaka for the Goddesses of Stardom Championship at Stardom Dream Queendom 2025.

On March 15, 2026, Kurara and Natsupoi defeated H.A.T.E. (Saya Kamitani and Konami). After the match, Kurara announced that she would put the faction on the line for Kamitani’s World of Stardom Championship at All Star Grand Queendom. On April 26, 2026, Kurara would defeat Kamitani for the World of Stardom Championship at All Star Grand Queendom, thus saving the faction from dissolution. At The Conversion, Kurara dropped the title to Suzu Suzuki, which ended the latter’s reign at 55 days.

=== Aya Sakura's and Sayaka Kurara's co-leadership (2026–present) ===
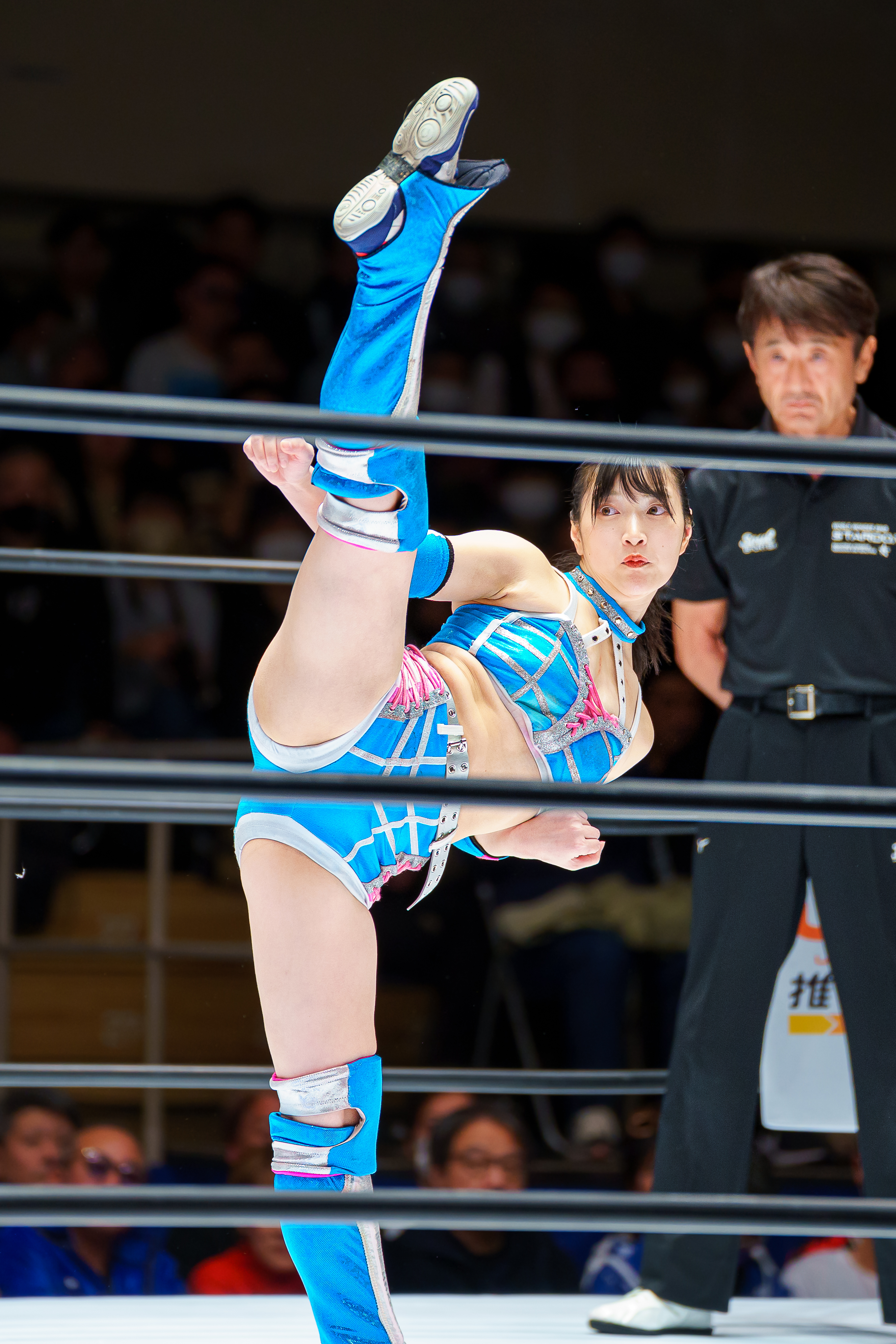
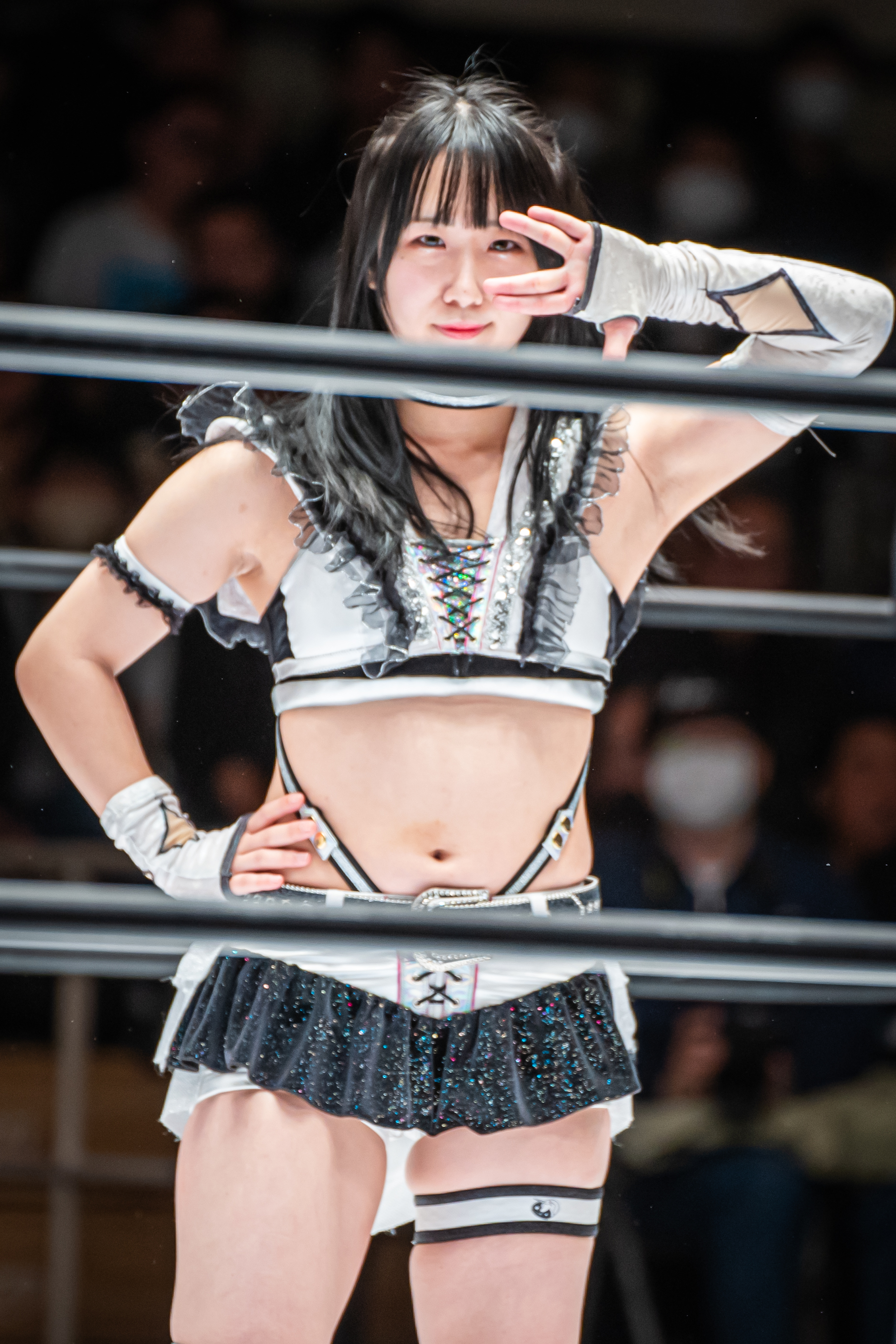
Aya Sakura (left) serves as the Captain and Sayaka Kurara (right) serves as the Center of the stable.

On June 30, 2026, Natsupoi, Anou, and Mizumori defeated Sakura, Kurara, and Kanaya. After the bout, Natsupoi accepted Kanaya into the stable and made her an official member. On the same night, Natsupoi anointed Sakura and Kurara as the new leaders, but Sakura refused the title of leader and became known as the captain. During a post-match interview, Kurara officially announced her position as the stable’s center.

=== New Japan Pro Wrestling (2021–present) ===
Nakano was part of the series of Stardom exhibition matches to promote female talent hosted by New Japan Pro Wrestling. On the second night of Wrestle Kingdom 15 from January 5, 2021, she teamed up with former stablemate Mayu Iwatani in a losing effort against Donna Del Mondo's Syuri and Giulia. On the second night of Wrestle Kingdom 16 on January 5, 2022, she teamed up with Saya Kamitani to defeat Starlight Kid and Mayu Iwatani. At Rumble on 44th Street on October 28, 2022, Mina Shirakawa and Waka Tsukiyama unsuccessfully challenged Kylie Rae and Tiara James. At Historic X-Over on November 20, 2022, Waka Tsukiyama competed in the Stardom Rambo, and Tam Nakano and Natsupoi teamed up with Taichi and Yoshinobu Kanemaru to defeat Suzuki-gun's El Desperado and Douki, and Oedo Tai's Starlight Kid and Momo Watanabe in a mixed tag team match. On January 4, 2023, Nakano failed to capture the IWGP Women’s Championship from KAIRI at Wrestle Kingdom 17. On November 17, 2024, Natsupoi alongside Taichi defeated Thekla & Clark Connors at Historic X-Over 2.

=== Freelance work (2022–present) ===
After Saki, Rina Amikura, Hikari Shimizu and Yuko Sakurai joined Cosmic Angels as the sub-unit of Color's, they continued to do freelance work since they were not full-time members of Stardom's roster. Saki and Shimizu participated in the 2022 edition of the Catch the Wave tournament. Saki reached the final A Block where she scored two points after competing against Nagisa Nozaki, Risa Sera and Kaori Yoneyama. Shimizu fought in the Block B where she also scored two points after going against Suzu Suzuki, Haruka Umesaki and Itsuki Aoki. On August 11, 2022, at Pure-J Rainbow Mountain 2022, Saki teamed up with Raydeen Hagane to defeat Kaori Yoneyama and Kakeru Sekiguchi for the Daily Sports Women's Tag Team Championship. At WAVE 15th Anniversary ~ Carnival WAVE on August 13, 2022, Saki and Hikari Shimizu defeated Yuki Miyazaki and Hibiscus Mii to win the Wave Tag Team Championship. At the Kizuna Tournament, Ice Ribbon's greatest yearly event, Sakurai teamed up with Asahi and defeated Saori Anou and Sumika Yanagawa but fell short to Amin and Ibuki Hoshi in the semifinals held on the same night on October 30, 2022.

On March 12, 2023, at WAVE Brand New Wave, Saki and Shimizu would drop the titles to Ikuto Hidaka and Itsuki Aoki, ending their reign at 211 days.

== Members ==
Cosmic Angels
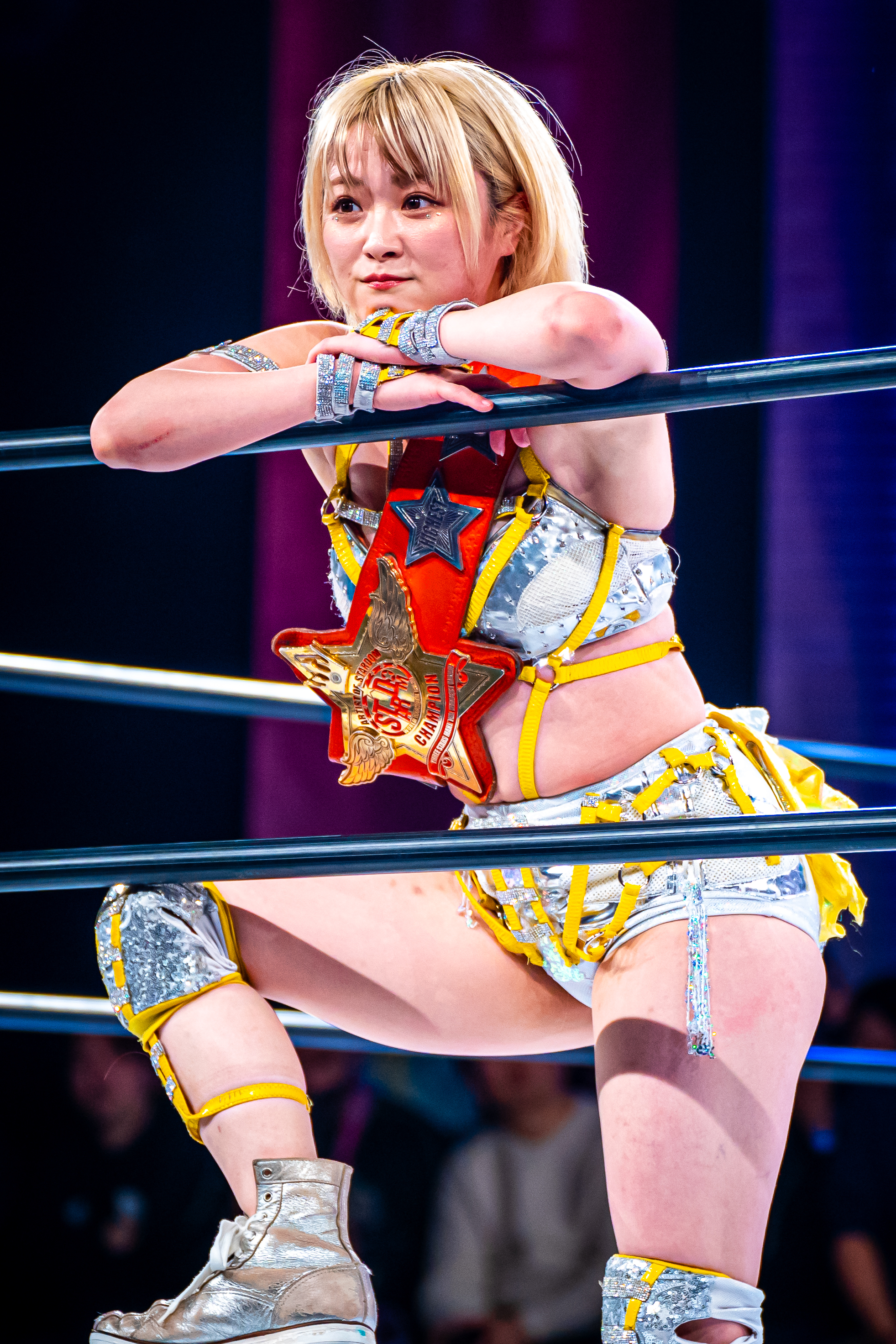
Natsupoi

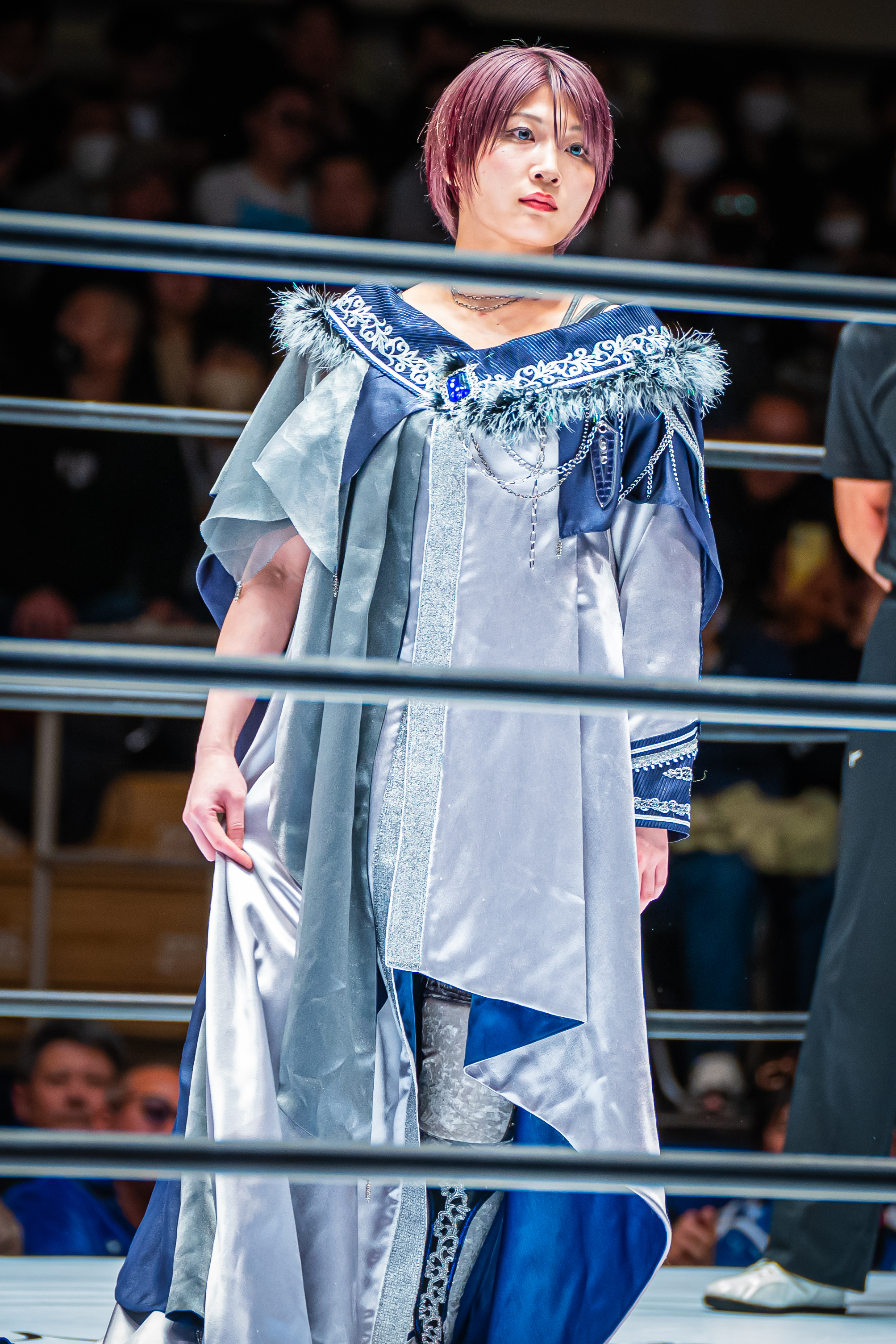
Saori Anou

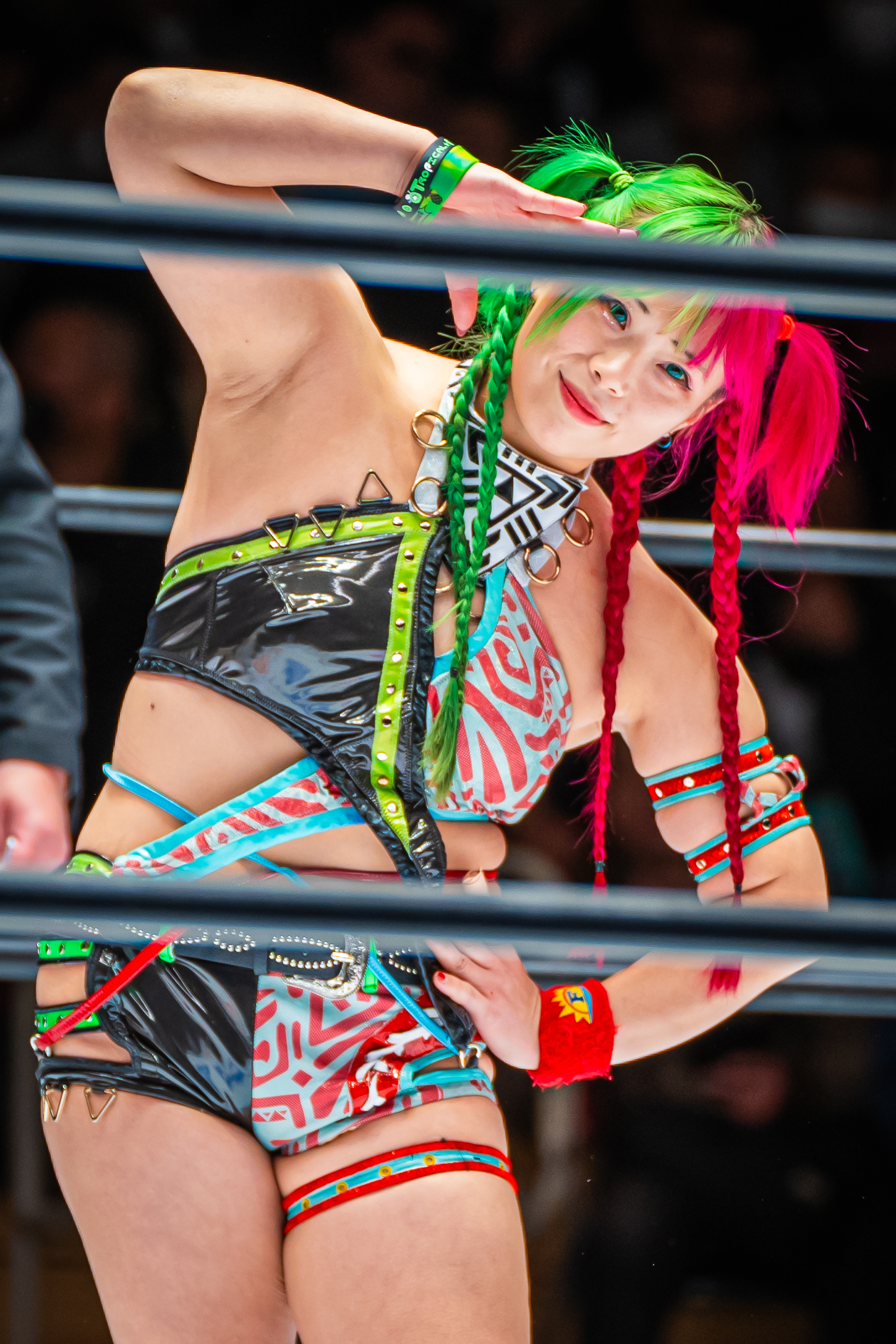
Yuna Mizumori

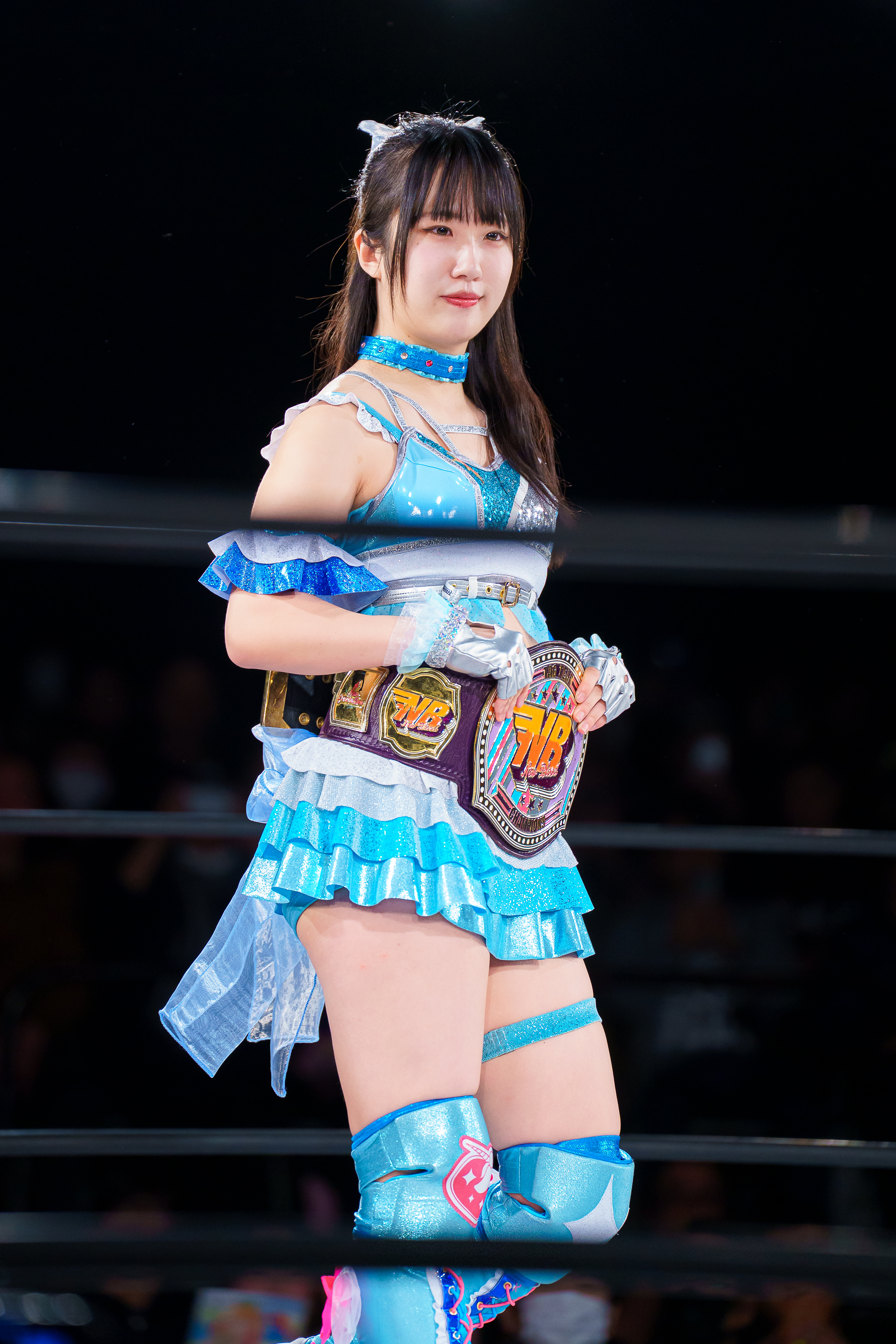
Sayaka Kurara (II)

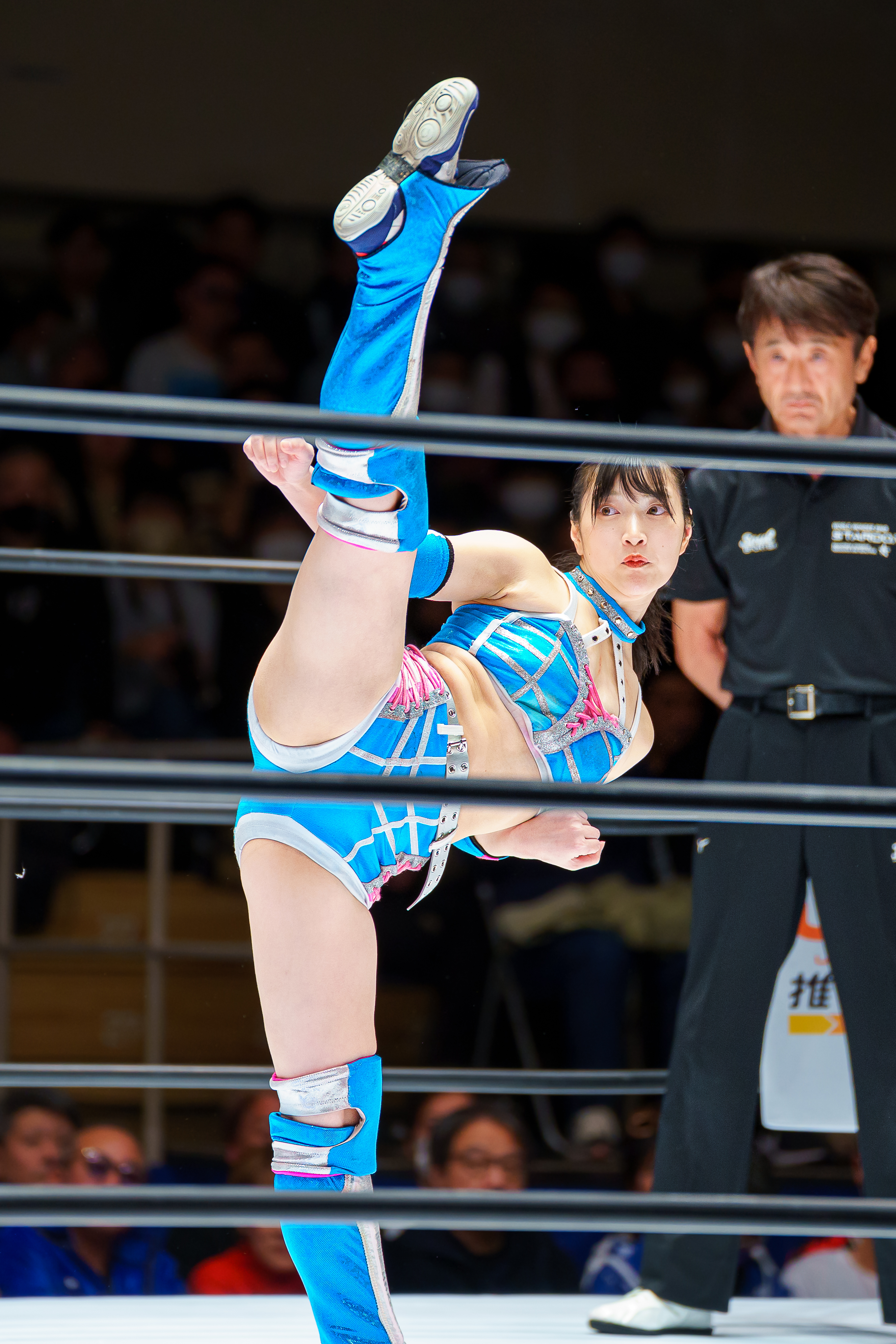
Aya Sakura (II)

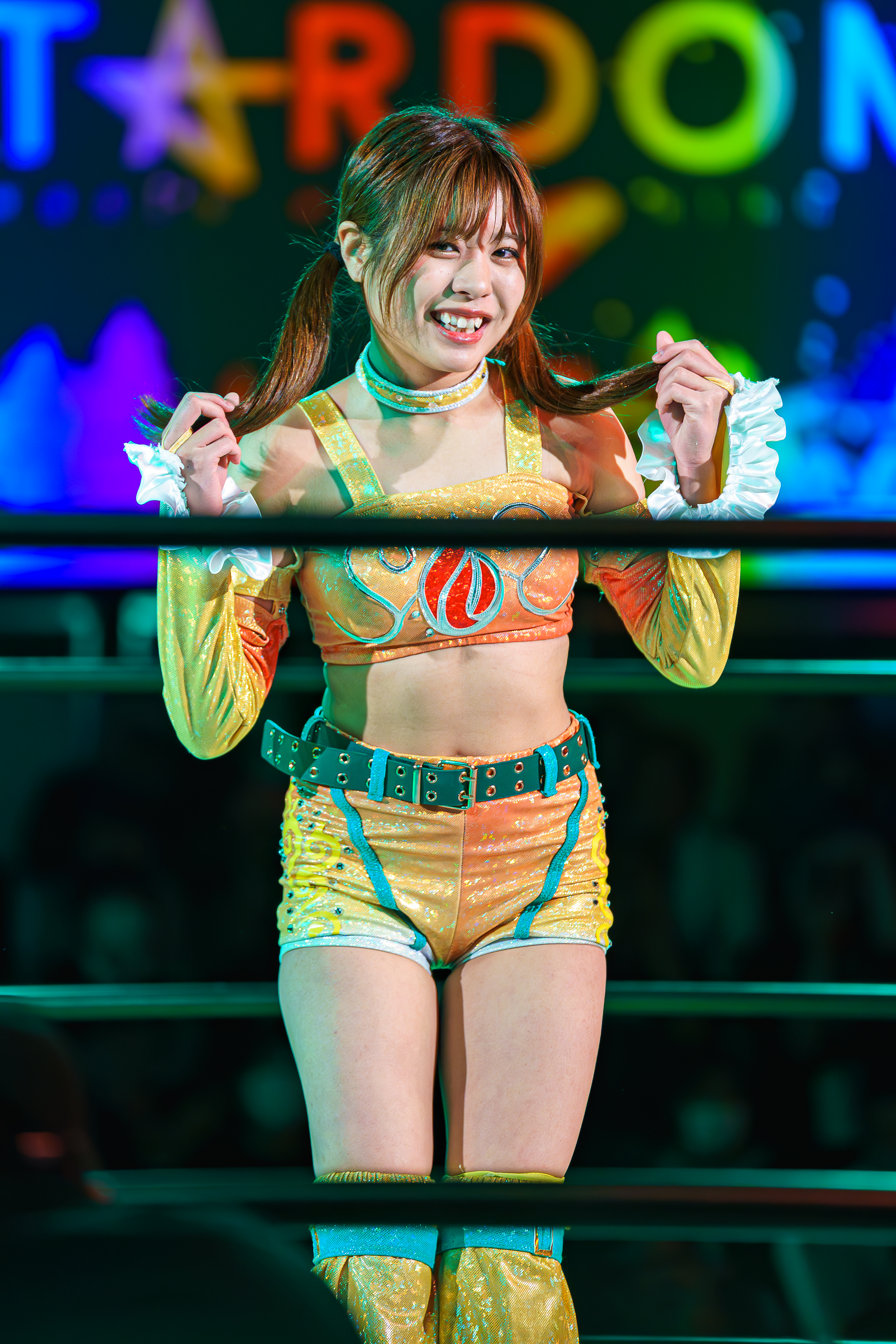
Anne Kanaya

*	Founding member
I-II	Leader(s)

=== Current ===
Member		Joined
Natsupoi (Note: After Nakano’s retirement prior to All Star Grand Queendom 2025, the group was left without a leader. After her departure, Natsupoi and Anou were seen taking the lead, steering the stable as its unofficial co-leaders. On June 30, 2026, Natsupoi officially passed the leadership to Sakura and Kurara. Sakura, finding the leader role as an “outdated” concept, chose to be known as the captain instead. In a backstage interview, Kurara anointed herself the center of the stable.)		July 9, 2022
Saori Anou		April 15, 2023
Yuna Mizumori		September 29, 2023
Sayaka Kurara	II	April 12, 2024
Aya Sakura	II	April 12, 2024
Anne Kanaya		June 30, 2026

=== Associates ===
Associate		Joined	Left
Unagi Sayaka	*	November 14, 2020	December 29, 2022 (Note: The date is based on Sayaka's Stardom contract termination which ended her status as an active member of the stable.); January 3, 2025 (Note: Sayaka lost to Tam Nakano in a "Name vs. Career match" at Stardom New Year Dream on January 3, 2025, a stipulation which hinted that Sayaka's career in Stardom was officially over, thus ending her part-time/associate status.)
Saki (Note: Since the beginning of 2023, Saki sporadically makes appearances into Stardom by teaming up with various of the unit's members.)		June 5, 2022	

=== Former ===
Member		Joined	Left
Mai Sakurai		August 13, 2021	February 12, 2022
Hikari Shimizu		June 5, 2022	February 17, 2023 (Note: Their last appearance in Stardom)
Rina Amikura		June 5, 2022	February 17, 2023
Yuko Sakurai		June 5, 2022	February 17, 2023
Mina Shirakawa	*	November 14, 2020	April 15, 2023
Waka Tsukiyama		September 28, 2021	April 15, 2023
Tam Nakano	*I	November 14, 2020	April 27, 2025

== Sub-groups ==
=== Current ===
Affiliate	Members	Tenure	Type
REStart/Natsu & Saori (Note: This was originally a sub-group in which Natsupoi and Saori performed alongside stable associate Kairi known as "REStart" while holding the Artist of Stardom Championship. After their affiliation with Kairi ended, Anou and Natsupoi continued to perform under the sub-group banner until the 2024 edition of the Goddesses of Stardom Tag League when they renamed their tag team as "Natsu & Saori".)	Natsupoi; Saori Anou	2023–present	Tag team
Sakurara	Aya Sakura; Sayaka Kurara	2024–present	Tag team
Cosmic⭐︎Carnival	Yuna Mizumori; Aya Sakura; Natsupoi	2026-present	Trio
Tropical⭐︎Haisai	Yuna Mizumori; Anne Kanaya	2026-present	Tag team

=== Former ===
Affiliate	Members	Tenure	Type
Dream H	Mina Shirakawa; Tam Nakano	2020–2023	Tag team
Shirakawa, Nakano, and Sayaka	Mina Shirakawa; Tam Nakano; Unagi Sayaka	2020–2022	Trio
Pink Kabuki	Mina Shirakawa; Unagi Sayaka	2021–2022	Tag team
meltear	Tam Nakano; Natsupoi	2022–2025	Tag team
Club Venus (Note: split to form their own unit)	Mina Shirakawa; Xia Brookside; Mariah May; Xena; Jessie (Note: Brookside, May, Xena and Jessie were never announced as official members of Cosmic Angels, therefore their status remained as associates.)	2022–2023	Sub-unit
Color's	Saki; Hikari Shimizu; Rina Amikura; Yuko Sakurai	2022–2023	Stable
GalaxyPunch! (Note: This is a sub-group of Color's under which Shimizu and Saki often compete in the independent scene.)	Hikari Shimizu; Saki	2022–2023	Tag team
Tropikawild	Saki; Yuna Mizumori	2024–2025	Tag team

== Championships and accomplishments ==
- Girl’s Pro-Wrestling Unit Color’s
  - Color’s Championship (2 times, current) – Saki
- Professional Wrestling Just Tap Out
  - JTO Girls Championship (1 time) – Sayaka
- Consejo Mundial de Lucha Libre
  - CMLL Japanese Women's Championship (1 time) – Sayaka
- Kitsune Women's Wrestling
  - Kitsune World Championship (1 time, inaugural) – Sayaka
- DDT Pro-Wrestling
  - Ironman Heavymetalweight Championship (1 time) – Saki
- Oz Academy
  - Oz Academy Openweight Championship (1 time) – Anou
  - Oz Academy Tag Team Championship (1 time, current) – with Unagi Sayaka (Note: Sayaka wasn’t part of the stable while holding the titles with Anou.)
  - Best Wizard Award (1 time)
    - Best Bout Award (2023) with Kakeru and Mayumi Ozaki vs. Chigusa Nagayo, Mio Momono and Tomoko Watanabe on October 22 - Anou
- Gatoh Move Pro Wrestling
  - Asia Dream Tag Team Championship (1 time) – Saki and Mizuki (Note: Mizuki wasn’t a part of the unit when she won the title with Saki)
- Pro Wrestling Illustrated
  - Singles wrestlers
    - Ranked Nakano No. 5 of the top 250 female singles wrestlers in the PWI Women's 250 in 2023
    - Ranked Anou No. 27 of the top 250 female singles wrestlers in the PWI Women's 250 in 2024
    - Ranked Natsupoi No. 40 of the top 250 female singles wrestlers in the PWI Women's 250 in 2024
    - Ranked Kurara No. 79 of the top 250 female singles wrestlers in the PWI Women's 250 in 2025
    - Ranked Saki No. 118 of the top 250 female singles wrestlers in the PWI Women's 250 in 2023
    - Ranked Shirakawa No. 123 of the top 150 female singles wrestlers in the PWI Women's 150 in 2022
    - Ranked Sayaka No. 147 of the top 150 female singles wrestlers in the PWI Women's 150 in 2021
    - Ranked Sakura No. 151 of the top 250 female singles wrestlers in the PWI Women's 250 in 2025
  - Tag team wrestlers
    - Ranked Nakano and Natsupoi No. 13 of the top 100 tag teams in the PWI Tag Team's 100 in 2023
    - Ranked Anou and Natsupoi No. 29 of the top 100 tag teams in the PWI Tag Team's 100 in 2023
- Pro Wrestling Wave
  - Wave Tag Team Championship (4 times) – Saki and Shimizu (1), Saki and Risa Sera (Note: Sera was not part of the stable while holding the titles with Saki.)(3)
  - Dual Shock Wave (2023) - Saki and Risa Sera (Note: Sera was not part of the stable when she won the tournament with Saki)
- Pure-J
  - Daily Sports Women's Tag Team Championship (1 time) – Saki with Rydeen Hagane (Note: Hagane was not part of the stable while holding the titles with Saki.)
  - Pure-J Openweight Championship (1 time) – Saki
- Sendai Girls' Pro Wrestling
  - Sendai Girls World Championship (1 time) – Anou
  - Sendai Girls Junior Championship (1 time) – Sakura
- Spark Joshi Puroresu of America
  - Spark Joshi Atlantic Championship (1 time, inaugural, current) – Saki
- Tokyo Sports
  - Women's Wrestling Grand Prize
    - (2023) – Nakano
- World Wonder Ring Stardom
  - Artist of Stardom Championship (3 times) – Nakano, Shirakawa and Sayaka (1); Kairi, Natsupoi and Saori Anou (1); Nakano, Anou and Natsupoi (1)
  - Future of Stardom Championship Tournament Winner (2021) – Shirakawa
  - Future of Stardom Championship (2 times) – Shirakawa (1) and Sayaka (1)
  - New Blood Tag Team Championship (1 time) – Sakura and Kurara
  - High Speed Championship (1 time, current) - Mizumori
  - Goddesses of Stardom Championship (2 times) – Nakano and Natsupoi (1), Natsupoi and Anou (1)
  - Wonder of Stardom Championship (5 times) – Nakano (2), Anou (2) and Natsupoi (1)
  - World of Stardom Championship (3 times) – Nakano (2), Kurara (1)
  - All-Star Rumble (2021) – Sayaka
  - Cinderella Tournament (2025) – Kurara
  - Goddesses of Stardom Tag League
    - (2025) – Sakura and Kurara
  - 5★Star GP Award (5 times)
    - 5★Star GP Finalist Award (2022) – Nakano
    - 5★Star GP Fighting Spirit Award (2021) – Sayaka
    - Blue Stars Best Match Award (2024) vs. Starlight Kid on August 15 in Blue Stars A – Anou
    - Blue Stars Best Match Award (2025) vs. Bozilla on August 6 in Blue Stars A – Anou
    - 5★Star GP Outstanding Performance (2023) - Natsupoi
  - Stardom Year-End Award (9 times)
    - MVP Award – Nakano (2023)
    - Best Match Award – Nakano vs. Giulia (2021)
    - Best Tag Team Award – Nakano and Natsupoi (2022); Natsupoi and Anou (2023)
    - Fighting Spirit Award – Nakano (2020); Sayaka (2021)
    - Shining Award – Nakano (2022)
    - Best Unit Award (2024)
    - Outstanding Performance Award – Anou (2024)

== Luchas de Apuestas record ==
Winner (wager)	Loser (wager)	Location	Event	Date	Notes
Tam Nakano (hair)	Giulia (hair)	Tokyo, Japan	All Star Dream Cinderella	March 3, 2021	
Saya Kamitani (Contract)	Tam Nakano (Contract)	Tokyo, Japan	Stardom Nighter at Korakuen Hall	March 3, 2025	
Saya Kamitani (Career)	Tam Nakano (Career)	Yokohama, Japan	Stardom All Star Grand Queendom 2025	April 27, 2025	
