= Kohaku (wrestler) =

Japanese professional wrestler

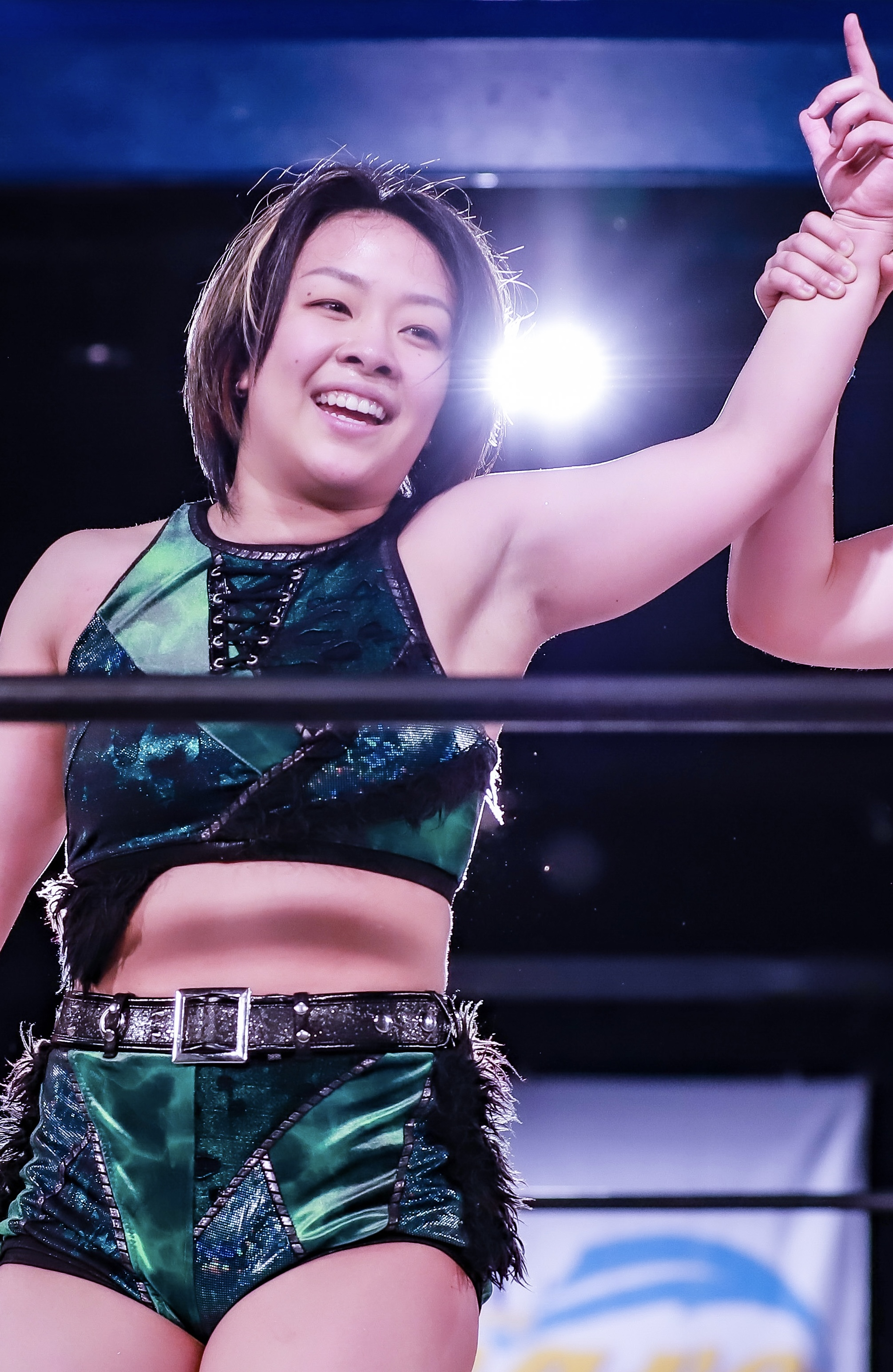
- Kohaku in April 2023

Personal information
- Born: April 17, 2001 (age 25) Okayama, Japan

Professional wrestling career
- Ring names: Hana Iwaki; Mikoto Shindo; Kohaku; Cohaku
- Billed height: 147 cm (4 ft 10 in)
- Billed weight: 55 kg (121 lb)
- Trained by: Chigusa Nagayo; Mio Momono
- Debut: 2018

Hana Iwaki (岩城華, Iwaki Hana) better known by her ring name Kohaku (狐伯; also transcribed as Cohaku) is a Japanese professional wrestler currently performing in the Japanese promotion Pro Wrestling Wave, where she previously held both the Wave Single Championship and the Wave Tag Team Championship. She is also known for her tenures with Sendai Girls' Pro Wrestling and Marvelous That's Women Pro Wrestling.

== Professional wrestling career ==
=== Marvelous That's Women Pro Wrestling (2018–2021) ===
Iwaki made her professional wrestling debut in Marvelous That's Women Pro Wrestling at a house show promoted on August 8, 2018, where she fell short to Yoshiko in singles competition. During her tenure with the promotion, she participated in various important events of the company such as the anniversary shows. At Marvelous 5th Anniversary on July 19, 2021, she competed in a Hardcore tag team match in which she teamed up with Tomoko Watanabe and Yuki Miyazaki in a losing effort against Asuka, Chikayo Nagashima and Kaoru.

=== Pro Wrestling Wave (2018–present) ===
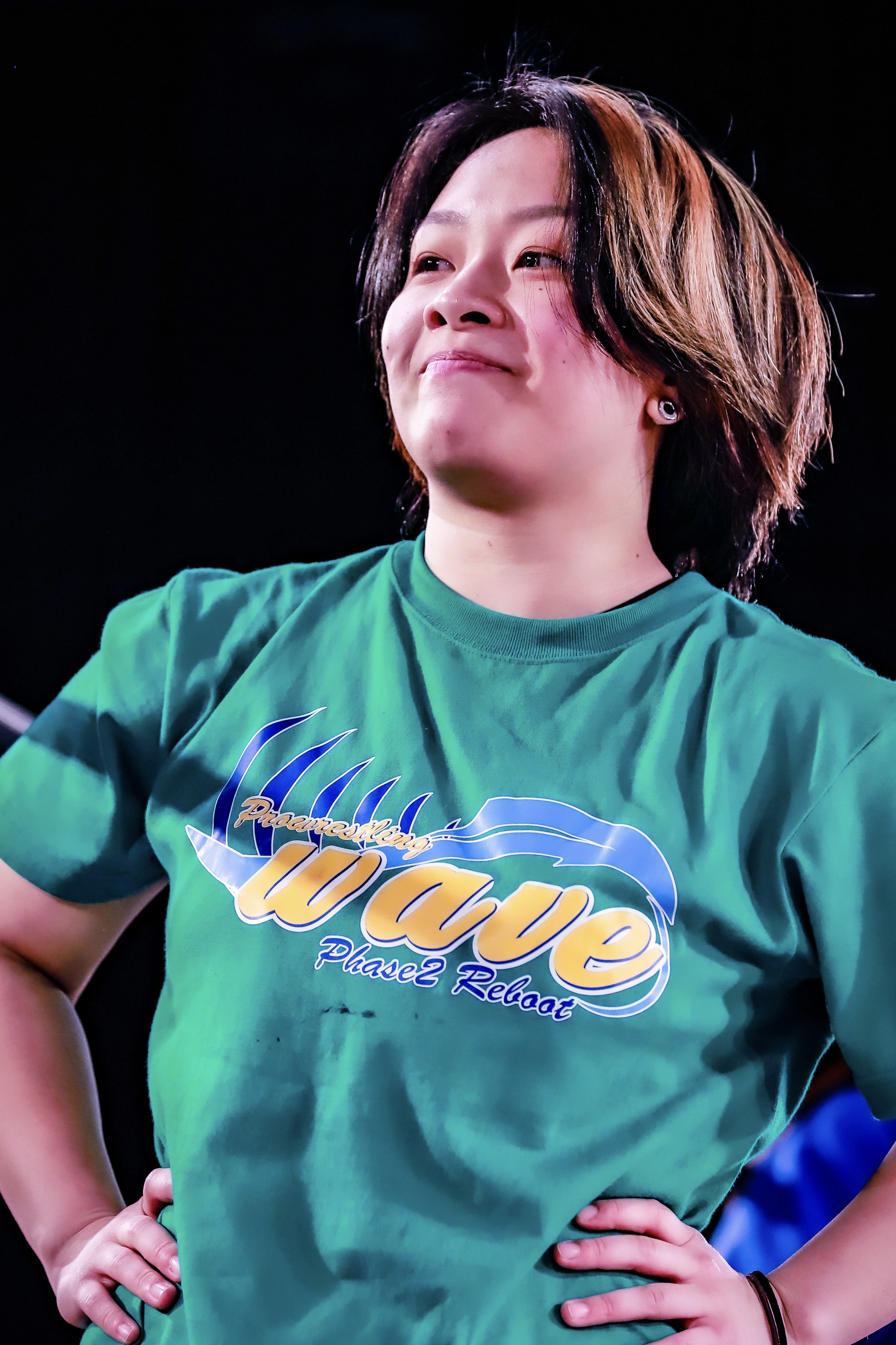
Iwaki at a house show of Pro Wrestling Wave from April 2023.

Iwaki made her debut in Pro Wrestling Wave at WAVE Aniversario WAVE 2018 on August 19, where she teamed up with Itsuki Aoki in a losing effort against Hiroe Nagahama and Miyuki Takase in a tag team match. Between 2018 and 2022, she competed as a part timer in the promotion under the name of "Mikoto Shindo". After resigning from Marvelous, Iwata appeared at WAVE PHASE 2 Reboot 3rd ~ NAMI 1 on April 1, 2022, under the new ring name of "Kohaku" as she fell short to Suzu Suzuki. She soon moved to title scenes as she unsuccessfully challenged Nagisa Nozaki for the Wave Single Championship at WAVE Happy Birthday WAVE ~ Sakurasaku on April 17, 2022. Iwaki returned to the title scene at WAVE Survival Dance ~ Regina Challenge when se came out unsuccessfully in a contendership battle royal won by Yuki Miyazaki and also involving many other notable opponents such as Ayame Sasamura, Hibiscus Mii, Kaori Yoneyama, Miyako Matsumoto, Sakura Hirota, Rina Amikura, and Yuko Sakurai. At WAVE Asahikawa WAVE on October 10, 2022, Iwaki teamed up with Yumi Ohka to unsuccessfully challenge galaxyPunch! (Hikari Shimizu and Saki for the Wave Tag Team Championship. Due to Wave sharing partnerships with other promotion's, Iwaki unsuccessfully competed for Pro-Wrestling: EVE's International Championship at WAVE NAMI 1 ~ Nami Hajime ~ GO WAVE on January 1, 2023, coming short to reigning champion Yuu.

She competed in various of the promotion's signature events such as the Catch the Wave tournament in which she made her first appearance at the 2022 edition where she placed herself in the Future Block, scoring a total of four points after going against Suzu Suzuki, Haruka Umesaki, Chie Ozora and Riko Kawahata.

=== Sendai Girls' Pro Wrestling (2018–2022) ===
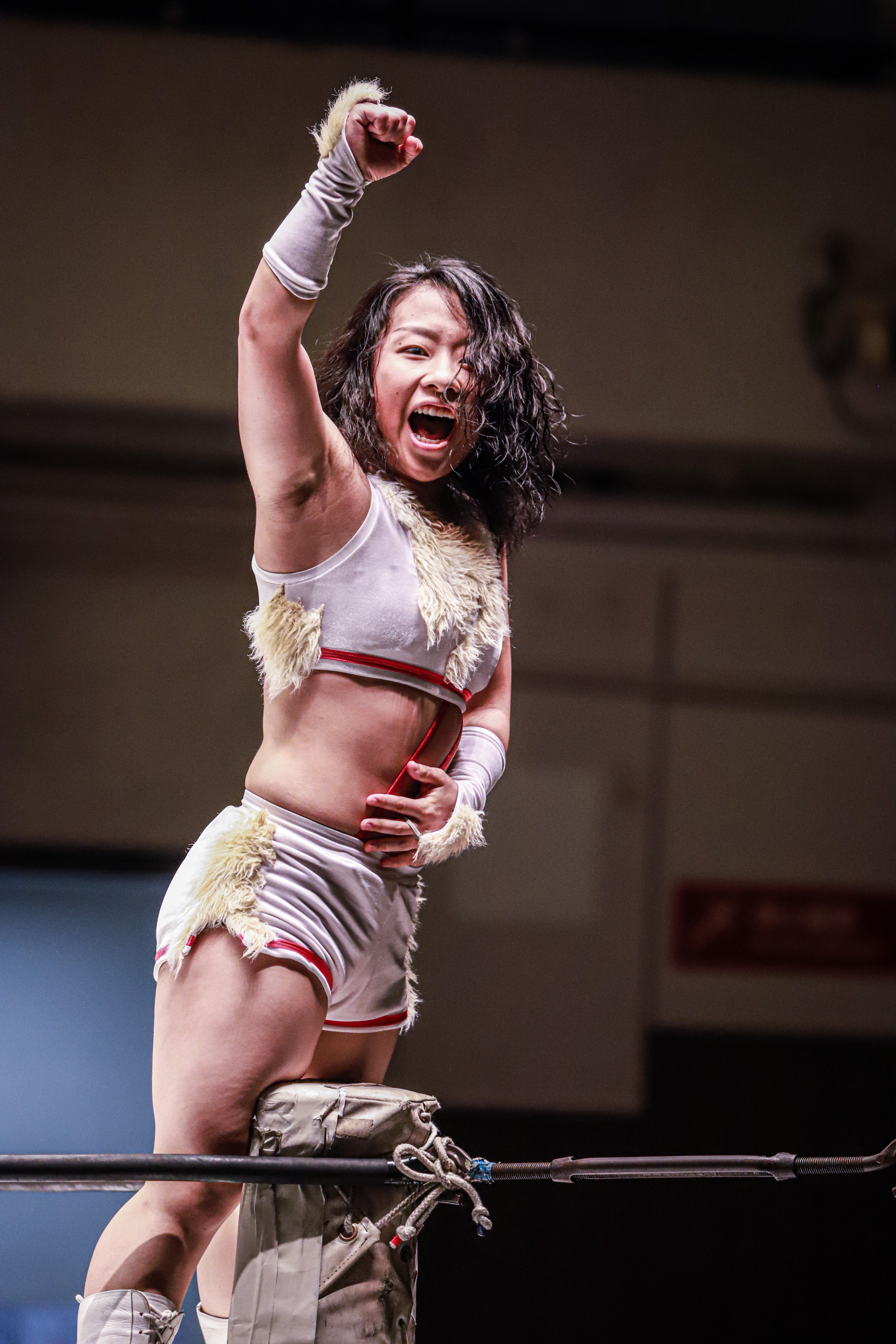
In Sendai Girls, Iwaki competed under the name of Mikoto Shindo.

Iwaki shared a four-year tenure with Sendai Girls' Pro Wrestling. She made her debut in the promotion under the ring name of Mikoto Shindo at a house show promoted on September 24, 2018, where she fell short to Manami in the first rounds of the inaugural Sendai Girls Junior Championship tournament. Due to being a freelancer in her beginning years, she freelanced in Sendai and competed in various match gimmicks. At a house show from January 20, 2019, she fought in a battle royal won by Manami and also involving notable opponents such as Alex Lee, Cassandra Miyagi, Chihiro Hashimoto, Dash Chisako, Hikaru Shida, Meiko Satomura, Mika Iwata, Sareee and others. She finally moved to title scenes when she won the Sendai Girls Junior Championship at Sendai Girls Women's Pro Wrestling Big Show in Niigata on June 8, 2019, by defeating Manami for the vacant title. Before resigning, she made her last appearance at Sendai Girls Big Show In Osaka on December 4, 2022, where she teamed up with Yuu to defeat Lena Kross and Nina Samuels.

She competed in one of the promotion's signature events, the Royal Tag Tournament, making her only appearance at the 2019 edition where she teamed up with Manami and defeated Nanami and Sareee in the first rounds and fell short to Reiwa Ultima Powers (Dash Chisako and Hiroyo Matsumoto) in the second rounds.

=== Independent scene (2018–present) ===
Due to partially working as a freelancer, Iwaki competed in several companies of the Japanese independent scene. At Seadlinnng Shin-Kiba 22nd NIGHT on February 13, 2020, she teamed up with Kaho Kobayashi and Tsukasa Fujimoto to defeat Las Fresa de Egoistas (Arisa Nakajima, Makoto and Maria). At 2AW GRAND SLAM In TKP Garden City Chiba, an event promoted by Active Advance Pro Wrestling on February 23, 2020, she teamed up with Rina Shingaki in a losing effort against Matsuya Uno and Tsukushi. She participated in one of Prominence stable's independent produced shows, the Prominence Kurenai No Rinka from January 9, 2023, where she competed in a five-way match won by Yuki Miyazaki and also involving Akane Fujita, Miyuki Takase and Risa Sera. At Oz Academy Restricted-18 At Osaka on February 19, 2023, she competed in a number one contendership tournament for the Oz Academy Openweight Championship in which she defeated Yako in the first rounds but fell short to Riko Kaiju in the semifinals. Iwaki made sporadic appearances in World Woman Pro-Wrestling Diana since 2018. She mainly participated in multiple-competitor tag team matches at house shows. At one kind of these events from July 18, 2022, she teamed up with Kyoko Inoue and Yuki Miyazaki in a losing effort against Crysis (Ayako Sato, Jaguar Yokota and Madeline).

== Championships and accomplishments ==
- Oz Academy
  - Oz Academy Tag Team Championship (1 time) – with Tsubasa Kuragaki
- Pro Wrestling Illustrated
  - Ranked No. 202 of the top 250 female wrestlers in the PWI Women's 250 in 2025
- Pro Wrestling Wave
  - Wave Single Championship (1 time)
  - Wave Tag Team Championship (2 times, current) – with Momoka Hanazono
  - Catch the Wave (2025)
  - Catch the Wave Award (1 time)
    - Best Performance Award (2024) with Shin Sakura Hirota vs. Honoka and Yuki Miyazaki on June 16
- Sendai Girls' Pro Wrestling
  - Sendai Girls Junior Championship (1 time)
