= Manami (wrestler) =

Japanese professional wrestler

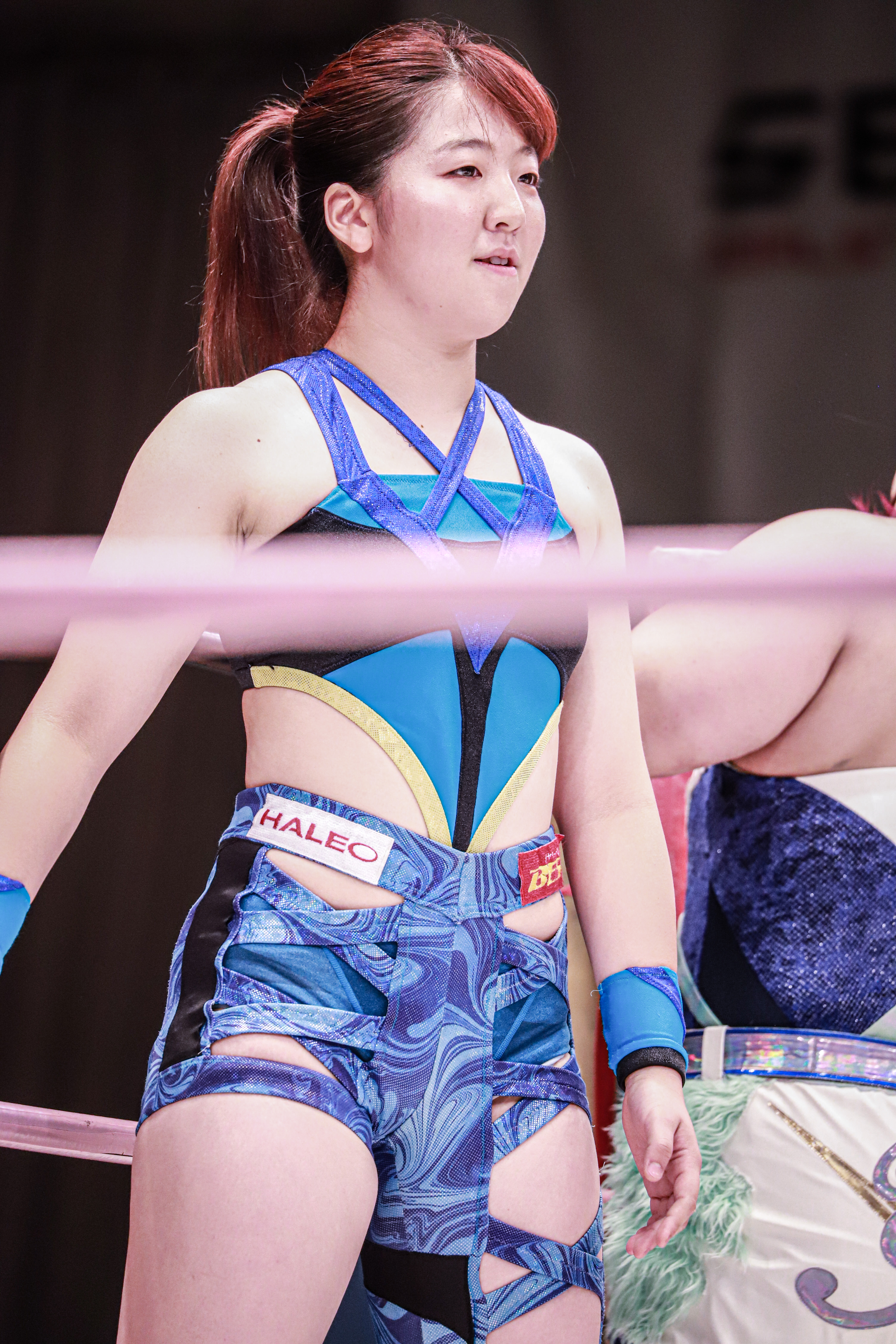
- Manami in July 2022

Personal information
- Born: August 10, 2004 (age 21) Hannan, Japan

Professional wrestling career
- Ring name: Manami
- Billed height: 160 cm (5 ft 3 in)
- Billed weight: 57 kg (126 lb)
- Trained by: Meiko Satomura
- Debut: 2017

Manami Yamazoe (山添愛美, Yamazoe Manami) better known monymously by her ring name Manami is a Japanese professional wrestler currently performing the Japanese promotion Sendai Girls' Pro Wrestling where she is a former Sendai Girls Junior Champion and Sendai Girls Tag Team Champion.

== Professional wrestling career ==
=== Sendai Girls' Pro Wrestling (2017–present) ===
Yamazoe is best known for her tenure with Sendai Girls' Pro Wrestling. She made her professional wrestling debut at a house show promoted on April 6, 2017, where she went into a time-limit draw against Ruaka in a dark exhibition match. During her tenure with the company, she chased for various championships promoted by it. She started competing for the Sendai Girls Junior Championship in the inaugural tournament in which she defeated Mikoto Shindo but fell short to Ayame Sasamura in the finals from October 14, 2018. She succeeded in winning the title one year later at Sendai Girls Joshi Puroresu Big Show in Sendai on October 13, 2019, by defeating Mikoto Shindo. Her reign lasted for 406 days and it is still the longest to date. Another title she won was the Sendai Girls Junior Championship which she caprutred alongside Mika Iida on September 20, 2021, at Sendai Girls Burning UP by defeating Mio Momono and Rin Kadokura.

She also took part in many match gimmicks. At Sendai Girls Road To GAEAism on October 1, 2021, she competed in a tag team gauntlet match in which she teamed up with Chihiro Hashimoto, Dash Chisako, Kanon, Mika Iwata, Natsuho Kaneko and Yurika Oka as "Team Sendai" in a losing effort against "Team Marvelous" (Hibiki, Maria, Masha Slamovich, Mei Hoshizuki, Mikoto Shindo, Mio Momono and Rin Kadokura). At Sendai Girls Joshi Puroresu Big Show 2021 In Niigata on June 27, she teamed up with Mika Iwata and Ryo Mizunami in a losing effort against Aja Kong, Ayame Sasamura and Hiroyo Matsumoto as a result of a six-woman tag team match.

Yamazoe competed in one of the promotion's signature events, the Royal Tag Tournament, making her only appearance at the 2019 edition where she teamed up with Mikoto Shindo and defeated Nanami and Sareee in the first rounds and fell short to Reiwa Ultima Powers (Dash Chisako and Hiroyo Matsumoto) in the second rounds.

=== Independent scene (2017–present) ===
Due to partially working as a freelancer, Yamazoe competed in several companies of the Japanese independent scene, mainly due to Sendai Girls' partnerships. At Diana Sareee's Debut 8th Anniversary, an event promoted by World Woman Pro-Wrestling Diana on March 10, 2019, she teamed up with Mikoto Shindo and Rina Shingaki in a losing effort against Aja Kong, Kaoru Ito and Kyoko Inoue. At Pure-J Fight Together 2021 on March 20, she unsuccessfully challenged Akari for the Princess of Pro-Wrestling Championship. At Seadlinnng Go! Niigata! on July 22, 2021, she teamed up with Mika Iwata and Ryo Mizunami in a losing effort against Honori Hana, Nanae Takahashi and Yuu. At WAVE PHASE 2 Reboot 3rd ~ NAMI 1, an event promoted by Pro Wrestling Wave on September 1, 2022, Yamazoe teamed up with Haruka Umesaki and Rina Amikura in a losing effort against Kohaku, Suzu Suzuki and Yuna Mizumori. At GLEAT G PROWRESTLING Ver. 46 ~Origin, an event promoted by Gleat on March 15, 2023, she teamed up with Mika Iwata to defeat Michiko Miyagi and Yukari Hosokawa.

== Championships and accomplishments ==
- Pro Wrestling Illustrated
  - Ranked No. 250 of the top 250 female wrestlers in the PWI Women's 250 in 2025
- Sendai Girls' Pro Wrestling
  - Sendai Girls Junior Championship (1 time)
  - Sendai Girls Tag Team Championship (3 times, current) – with Mika Iwata (1) and Ryo Mizunami (2)
