= Sendai Girls Junior Championship =

Women's professional wrestling championship

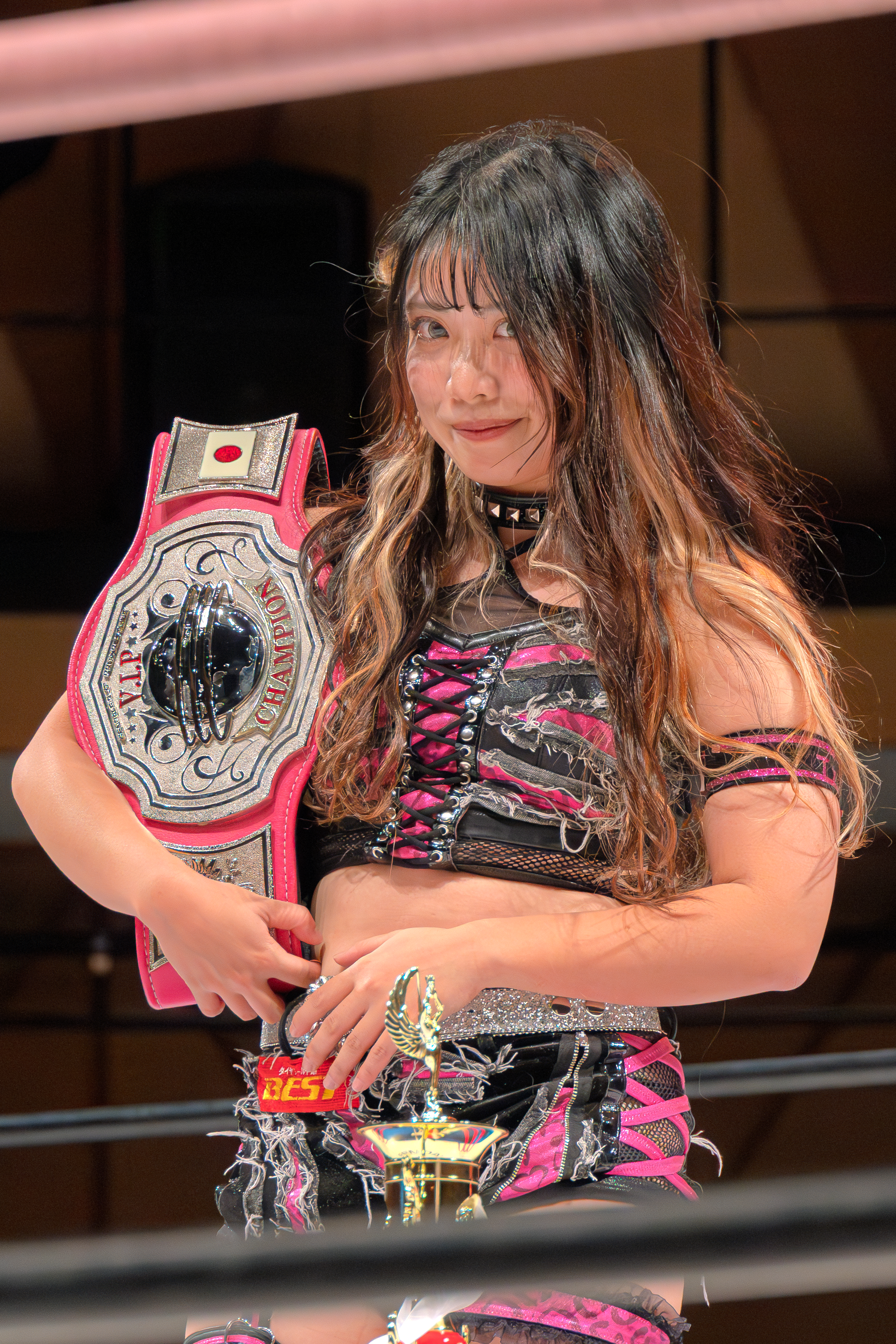
- Yuna with the current belt design in November 2025

Details
- Promotion: Sendai Girls' Pro Wrestling
- Date established: October 14, 2018
- Status: Vacant (as of August 28, 2026)
Statistics
- First champion: Ayame Sasamura
- Most reigns: All titleholders (1 reign)
- Longest reign: Manami (406 days)
- Shortest reign: Command Bolshoi (4 days)
- Oldest champion: Command Bolshoi (age is unknown) (Note: During her career, Bolshoi kept her real identity private, including her real name and date of birth. While her age is unknown, she is the oldest champion as she made her wrestling debut in the early 1990s.)
- Youngest champion: Yurika Oka (17 years, 247 days)
- Heaviest champion: Senka Akatsuki (150 lb)
- Lightest champion: Command Bolshoi (106 lbs)

The Sendai Girls Junior Championship is a women's professional wrestling championship, the secondary singles championship in Sendai Girls' Pro Wrestling. There have been a total of eleven reigns shared between thirteen different champions, and three vacancies. The title is currently vacant.

== Reigns ==
As of October 19, 2026, there have been a total of thirteen reigns shared between thirteen different champions and three vacancies. Ayame Sasamura was the inaugural champion. Manami's reign is the longest at 406 days, while Command Bolshoi's reign is the shortest at four days. Bolshoi is the oldest champion, although her age is unknown as she kept her real name and age in private. Yurika Oka is the youngest champion at 17 years old.

Key
No.	Overall reign number
Reign	Reign number for the specific champion
Days	Number of days held
Defenses	Number of successful defenses
+	Current reign is changing daily

No.	Champion	Championship change			Reign statistics			Notes	Ref.
No.	Champion	Date	Event	Location	Reign	Days	Defenses	Notes	Ref.
1	Ayame Sasamura	October 14, 2018	Joshi Puroresu Big Show 2018 in Sendai	Sendai, Miyagi, Japan	1	84	1	Defeated Manami in a tournament final to become the inaugural champion.	
2	Millie McKenzie	January 6, 2019	Sendai Girls	Tokyo, Japan	1	101	2		
3	Command Bolshoi	April 17, 2019	Sendai Girls	Nagoya, Aichi, Japan	1	4	0		
—	Vacated	April 21, 2019	—	—	—	—	—	The championship was vacated after Command Bolshoi retired from professional wrestling.	
4	Mikoto Shindo	June 8, 2019	Sendai Girls Women's Pro Wrestling Big Show in Niigata	Niigata, Honshu, Japan	1	127	1	Defeated Manami to win the vacant championship.	
5	Manami	October 13, 2019	Sendai Girls Joshi Puroresu Big Show in Sendai	Sendai, Miyagi, Japan	1	406	2		
6	Mei Hoshizuki	November 22, 2020	Sendai Girls Kick Revived	Sendai, Miyagi, Japan	1	217	2		
7	Yurika Oka	June 27, 2021	Big Show 2021 In Niigata	Niigata, Japan	1	245	3		
8	Tomoka Inaba	February 27, 2022	Sendai Girls Acceleration	Nagaoka, Japan	1	133	1		
—	Vacated	July 10, 2022	JTO 3rd Anniversary ~ Iwai	Tokyo, Japan	—	—	—	The championship was vacated after Tomoka Inaba won the 2022 JTO Girls Tournament in a match against Aoi, where her Queen Of JTO Championship was also on the line.	
9	Chi Chi	November 9, 2024	Sendai Girls Big Show In Niigata	Niigata, Japan	1	130	3	Defeated Yuna to win the vacant title.	
10	Aya Sakura	March 19, 2025	Sendai Girls The Top Of Joshi Wrestling	Tokyo, Japan	1	158	2		
11	Yuna	August 24, 2025	Senjo The Biggest	Sendai, Miyagi, Japan	1	152	2		
12	Senka Akatsuki	January 23, 2026	Sendai Girls Step And Go	Sendai, Miyagi, Japan	1	170	3		
13	Spike Nishimura	July 13, 2026	Sendai Girls SENJO 20th Anniversary Tour In Sendai PIT ~ SENJO The Biggest ~	Sendai, Miyagi, Japan	1	47	2		
—	Vacated	August 28, 2026	Sendai Girls SENJO 20th Anniversary Tour In Yoyogi ~ The Top Of Joshi Wrestling ~	Tokyo, Japan	—	—	—	The championship was vacated after Spike’s eligibility for the title had expired.	

== Combined reigns ==
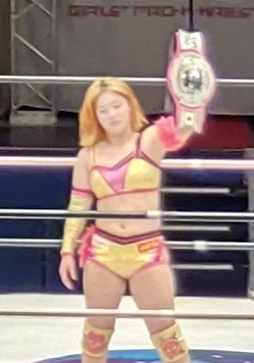
Former champion Yurika Oka

†	Indicates the current champion

Rank	Wrestler	No. of reigns	Combined defenses	Combined days
1	Manami	1	2	406
2	Yurika Oka	1	3	245
3	Mei Hoshizuki	1	2	217
4	Senka Akatsuki	1	3	170
5	Aya Sakura	1	2	158
6	Yuna	1	2	152
7	Tomoka Inaba	1	1	133
8	Chi Chi	1	3	130
9	Mikoto Shindo	1	1	127
10	Millie McKenzie	1	2	101
11	Ayame Sasamura	1	1	84
12	Spike Nishimura	1	2	47
13	Command Bolshoi	1	0	4
