= Plum Mariko Memorial Show =

Annual professional wrestling event

The Plum Mariko Memorial Show was an annual professional wrestling event held in 1997 and 1998 in memory of Plum Mariko featuring representatives from joshi promotions All Japan Women's Pro-Wrestling, J'd, JWP Joshi Puroresu, Ladies Legend Pro-Wrestling and NEO as well as puroresu promotions Big Japan Pro Wrestling, Frontier Martial-Arts Wrestling, IWA Japan and Yoshiaki Yatsu's Super Pro Wrestling Federation. The first show was held in Tokyo, Japan at the Ota Ward Gym on October 30, 1997, and was attended by 2,500 fans. The main event featured Cutie Suzuki and Dynamite Kansai defeating Mayumi Ozaki in a "handicap" match. On the undercard, AJW's Kaoru Ito and Nanae Takahashi defeated Kumiko Maekawa and Momoe Nakanishi and FMW's Crusher Maedomari defeated Kaoru Nakayama.

A second show was held the following year at the Ota Ward Gym on August 13, 1998, with 2,703 in attendance. Mayumi Ozaki and Devil Masami defeated Cutie Suzuki and Dynamite Kansai in the main event and, on the undercard, Manami Toyota and Kumiko Maekawa defeated Nanae Takahashi and Momoe Nakanishi and AJW's Hikari Fukuoka, Kanako Motoya and Harumi Yagi defeated Rieko Amano, Tomoko Kuzumi and Tomoko Miyaguchi.

== Show results ==
=== First Annual Plum Mariko Memorial Show ===
October 30, 1997 in Tokyo, Japan (Ota Ward Gym)

No.	Results	Stipulations
1	Devil Masami, Tomoko Miyaguchi, Sari Osami and Command Bolshoi defeated Hikari Fukuoka, Tomoko Kuzumi, Kanako Motoya and Rieko Amano	8-woman match (JWP)
2	Kyoko Inoue defeated Esther Moreno	Singles match
3	Aya Koyama defeated Nana Fujimura	Singles match (Big Japan)
4	Chiharu defeated Misa Okada	Singles match (SPWF)
5	Chikako Shiratori and Yuki Lee defeated Yoko Kosugi and Miyuki Sogabe	Tag team match (J'd)
6	Emi Motokawa defeated Sachie Nishibori	Singles match (IWA Japan)
7	Harley Saito defeated Eagle Sawai	Singles match (LLPW)
8	Crusher Maedomari defeated Kaoru Nakayama	Singles match (FMW)
9	Kaoru Ito and Nanae Takahashi defeated Kumiko Maekawa and Momoe Nakanishi	Tag team match (AJW)
10	Cutie Suzuki and Dynamite Kansai defeated Mayumi Ozaki in a handicap match	Tag team match (JWP)

=== Second Annual Plum Mariko Memorial Show ===
August 13, 1998 in Tokyo, Japan (Ota Ward Gym)

No.	Results	Stipulations	Times
1	Sachie Nishibori (IWA) and Erika Watanabe (JWP) defeated Team JWP (Tomiko Sai and Kayoko Haruyama) when Watanabe pinned Sai	Tag team match (IWA/JWP)	18:03
2	Yoshiko Tamura and Tanny Mouse defeated Saya Endo and Misae Genki when Tamura forced Endo to submit	Singles match (Neo)	14:27
3	Ryuji Yamakawa and Tomoaki Honma defeated Gennosuke Kobayashi and Tomokazu Fueda when Yamakawa forced Fueda to submit	Tag team match (Big Japan)	11:49
4	Sumie Sakai and Megumi Yabushita defeated Echicera and Bloody when Yabushita pinned Echicera	Tag team match (J'd)	10:14
5	Manami Toyota and Kumiko Maekawa defeated Nanae Takahashi and Momoe Nakanishi when Maekawa pinned Nakanishi	Tag team match (AJW)	14:40
6	Hikari Fukuoka, Kanako Motoya and Harumi Yagi defeated Rieko Amano, Tomoko Kuzumi and Tomoko Miyaguchi when Motoya pinned Mayaguchi	6-woman tag team match	18:15
7	Mayumi Ozaki and Devil Masami defeated Cutie Suzuki and Dynamite Kansai when Ozaki pinned Suzuki	Singles match (JWP)	16:10
