= Plum Mariko =

Japanese professional wrestler (1967 – 1997)

Personal information
- Born: Mariko Umeda (梅田 麻里子, Umeda Mariko); November 1, 1967 Ōta, Tokyo, Japan
- Died: August 16, 1997 (aged 29) Hiroshima, Hiroshima, Japan

Professional wrestling career
- Ring name(s): Mariko Umeda; Plum Mariko
- Billed height: 5 ft 2 in (157 cm)
- Billed weight: 121 lb (55 kg)
- Trained by: Kotetsu Yamamoto; Gran Hamada
- Debut: 1986

Mariko Umeda (梅田 麻里子, Umeda Mariko; November 1, 1967 – August 16, 1997), better known by her ring name Plum Mariko (プラム麻里子, Puramu Mariko), was a Japanese female professional wrestler who wrestled for Japan Women's Pro-Wrestling from 1986 to 1992 and then, JWP Joshi Puroresu from 1992 until her death in 1997. Mariko was the first professional wrestler in Japan to die as a result of injuries suffered in a wrestling match.

== Career ==
During her career, Mariko received many ring injuries which eventually resulted in a brain abscess. She had previously suffered several concussions, but continued to wrestle. On August 15, 1997, she teamed with Command Bolshoi against Mayumi Ozaki and Rieko Amano at the Hiroshima Sun Plaza, Hiroshima. At the match's conclusion, Ozaki used one of her regular moves, the Liger Bomb, to pin Mariko. The move was executed just as usual, but appeared to have triggered a pre-existing problem. Since other wrestlers on the card had sold their finishes that night, the fans in the arena didn't immediately realize there was a problem. It seems that this spot may not have been the planned finish of the match.

In any case, Mariko was knocked out from the Liger Bomb and didn't kick out. After the match, Ozaki and the other wrestlers saw Mariko, who still hadn't budged, snoring, which was a sign that her tongue was blocking her airways. Mariko died a few hours later on August 16, 1997. No postmortem was performed on her at the request of her father. Despite this, Mariko was said to have had head injuries and an abscess on her brain which may have contributed to the head trauma that killed her. An annual memorial show was held in her honor from 1997 to 1998. Both JWP and Mayumi Ozaki's Oz Academy have held annual memorial shows since. Mariko was posthumously inducted into the All Japan Women's Hall of Fame on November 29, 1998.

In a 2022 interview, Cutie Suzuki revealed that Mariko's death profoundly impacted her, raising her awareness of the dangers of professional wrestling and altering her perspective on mortality.

== Championships and accomplishments ==
- All Japan Women's Pro Wrestling

- AJW Hall of Fame (1998)

- Japan Women's Pro Wrestling

- JWP Junior Championship (1 time)
- UWA Women's Junior Championship (1 time)

== See also ==
- List of premature professional wrestling deaths
