= The Ninja Dragon =

- Cover of the original VHS release of the film
- Directed by: Go Nagai
- Written by: Go Nagai; Hitoshi Matsuyama
- Produced by: Taro Maki
- Starring: Kenji Otsuki; Tetsuya Matsui; Cutie Suzuki; Etsuko Shinkoda; Mayumi Ozaki; Ikko Furuya; Rikiya Yasuoka; Katsumi Muramatsu; Kobuhei Hayashiya; Yoshiaki Umegaki
- Cinematography: Eiichi Osawa
- Edited by: Yoshifumi Fukazawa
- Music by: Takashi Mitsuda
- Distributed by: Tohokushinsha Film Corporation
- Release date: October 25, 1990
- Running time: 70 minutes
- Country: Japan
- Language: Japanese

Kūsō Kagaku Ninkyōden: Gokudō Ninja Dosuryū (空想科学任侠伝 極道忍者ドス竜, Kūsō kagaku ninkyō den gokudō ninja dosu ryū), better known for its international title as The Ninja Dragon (not to be confused with the 1986 Hong Kong film Ninja Dragon (1986) directed by Godfrey Ho), is a 1990 Japanese direct-to-video action film released by the Tohokushinsha Film Corporation.

It was directed by Go Nagai, his third film as director and his first as a solo director. The film was produced by Dynamic Planning, Moby Dick and the Tohokushinsha Film Corporation. A Laserdisc version was also released in Japan.

It was the first film starring Japanese rock musician Kenji Otsuki. It also features famous female Japanese wrestlers Cutie Suzuki and Mayumi Ozaki, and also Japanese idol Etsuko Shinkoda. The film has cameos of Ken Ishikawa, Chiaki Kawamata, Shintaro Ko, Yoichi Komatsuzawa, Tokitoshi Shiota, Haruka Takachiho, Kunio Nagatani, Kaizo Hayashi, Fujiko F. Fujio, Mari Yagisawa and Tetsu Yano.

A manga was also created by Go Nagai and Shinoyama Isami, and released as a single tankōbon on November 7, 1990 by Kadokawa Shoten. A 219 pages light novel was also released in 1990, written by Kazuo Sakurai and published by Enix, with the ISBN 4-900527-46-7 and ISBN 978-4-900527-46-1.

== Cast ==
- Kenji Otsuki as Ryu Momoji/Yu Shinoyama/Ninja Dragon
- Tetsuya Matsui as Suzuka Hatai/Ninja Defender
- Cutie Suzuki as Jun Saruwatari
- Etsuko Shinkoda as Shinobu Nindo
- Mayumi Ozaki as Female Killer
- Ikko Furuya as Takeo Nindo
- Rikiya Yasuoka as Go Ranjuji
- Katsumi Muramatsu
- Kobuhei Hayashiya
- Yoshiaki Umegaki

=== English voice cast ===
- Eric Stuart as Ninja Dragon
- Tom Wayland as Suzuka Hatai
- Lotus as Jun Saruwatari
- Anne Sackmann as Shinobu Nindo
- Bill Carney as Takeo Nindo
- Barry Banner
- Tim Brash
- Wally Cole
- Ross Lefko

== International releases ==
The film was licensed in North America by Central Park Media and was released onto DVD and VHS, under their Asia Pulp Cinema label. The English dub was produced by Audioworks Producers Group in New York City.

- 2002-07-02 subtitled VHS version
- 2002-08-13 dubbed VHS version
- 2002-08-13 subtitled/dubbed DVD version
- 2005-05-24 subtitled/dubbed DVD version (Canada)
