= Kaoru (wrestler) =

Japanese professional wrestler (born 1969)

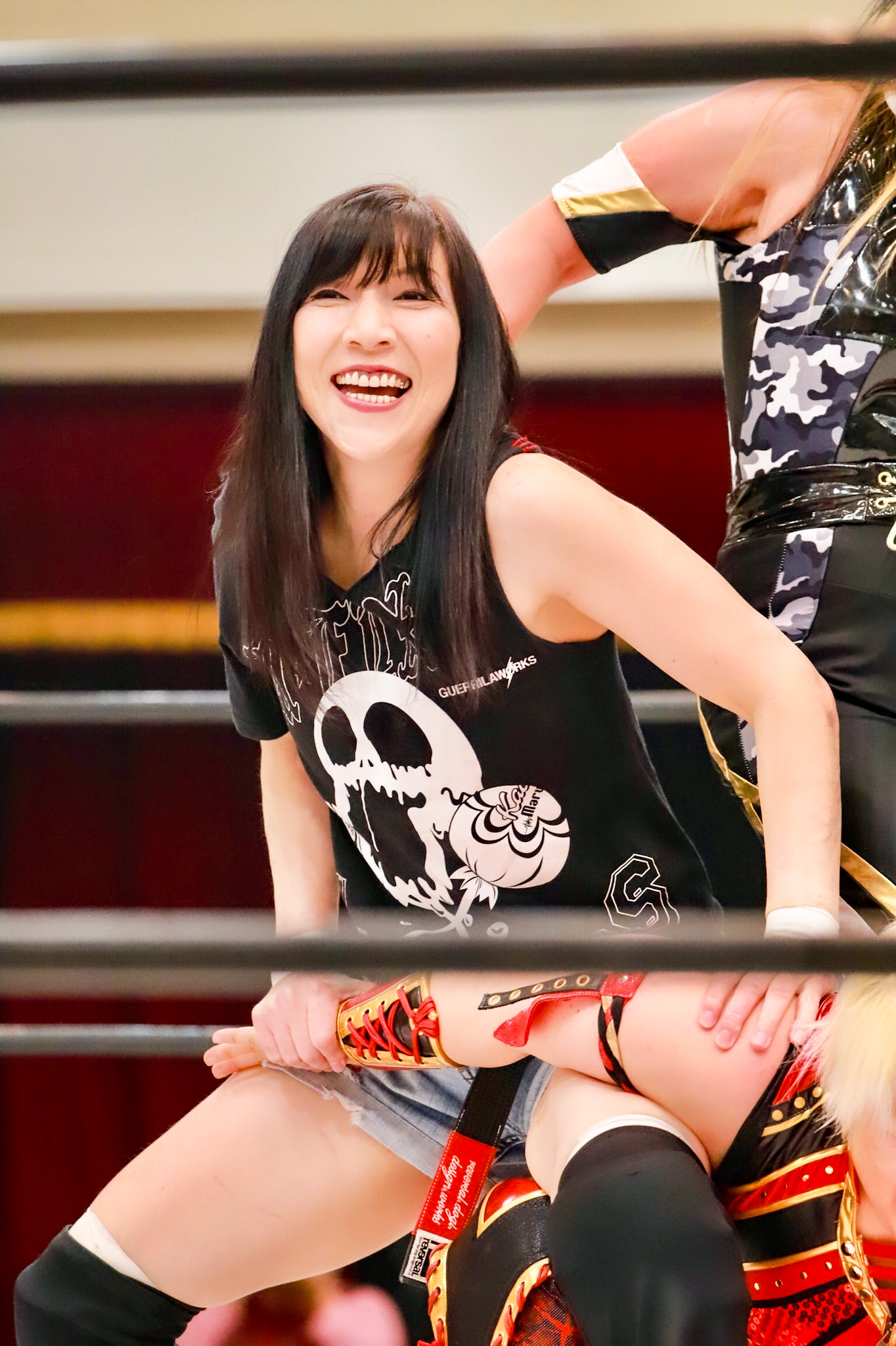
- Kaoru in April 2021

Personal information
- Born: Kaoru Maeda; February 9, 1969 (age 57) Sasebo, Nagasaki, Japan

Professional wrestling career
- Ring name(s): Dara; Infernal Kaoru; Kaoru; Kaoru Maeda
- Billed height: 1.67 m (5 ft 5 1/2 in)
- Billed weight: 63 kg (139 lb)
- Trained by: Jaguar Yokota
- Debut: August 8, 1986
- Retired: August 8, 2022

Kaoru Maeda (前田 薫, Maeda Kaoru; born February 9, 1969) is a Japanese retired professional wrestler better known by the mononymous ring name Kaoru (stylized in all capital letters as KAORU). Billed as the "Original Hardcore Queen", she is known for her wrestling style, which combines high-flying with hardcore wrestling. Trained by the All Japan Women's Pro-Wrestling (AJW) promotion, Maeda worked in both Japan and Mexico in the late 80s and early 90s, before making her breakthrough in the Gaea Japan promotion, where she most notably was a founding member of the D-Fix stable. After the folding of Gaea Japan in 2005, Maeda became a freelancer, though closely affiliating herself with the Oz Academy promotion. After returning from a three-year-long injury break in March 2014, Maeda resumed working as a freelancer, before signing with the new Marvelous promotion in January 2015.

== Professional wrestling career ==
=== All Japan Women's Pro-Wrestling (1986–1991) ===
Maeda received her training in professional wrestling at the All Japan Women's Pro-Wrestling (AJW) dojo, where she was trained by Jaguar Yokota alongside the likes of Aja Kong, Dynamite Kansai and Mayumi Ozaki. She made her debut, working under her real name, on August 8, 1986, facing Megumi Kudo at an AJW event in Higashimurayama, Tokyo. On December 26, 1987, Maeda made it to the finals of a tournament for the vacant AJW Junior Championship, before being defeated by Suzuka Minami. The following year, she formed the Honey Wings tag team with Mika Takahashi. After the two made it to the finals of a tournament for the vacant AJW Tag Team Championship, where they were defeated by Erika Shishido and Nobuko Kimura on April 2, 1988, the Honey Wings came back on October 10 and defeated Shishido and Kimura in a rematch to become the new AJW Tag Team Champions. After a five-month reign, Maeda and Takahashi lost the title to Miori Kamiya and Reibun Amada on March 4, 1989. The Honey Wings would regain the title on June 1, 1990, by defeating the Sweet Hearts (Manami Toyota and Mima Shimoda). After another five-month reign, they lost the title to Etsuko Mita and Mima Shimoda on November 14, 1990. Shortly afterwards, Maeda left AJW.

=== Universal Pro-Wrestling (1991–1993) ===
After leaving AJW, Maeda began working for Japanese lucha libre promotion Universal Pro-Wrestling, now performing under her given name, stylized in all capital letters. On January 19, 1992, Kaoru and Lady Apache made it to the finals of a tournament for the vacant UWA World Women's Tag Team Championship, where they were defeated by the team of Manami Toyota and Toshiyo Yamada. Through Universal Pro, Kaoru also made appearances in Mexico for the Empresa Mexicana de Lucha Libre (EMLL) promotion, where she worked under a mask. Kaoru's tours of Mexico culminated on March 21, 1993, in Mexico City, when she lost her mask to La Diabólica in a Lucha de Apuestas. During her years in Universal Pro, Kaoru also held the JCTV Women's Championship.

=== Gaea Japan (1994–2005) ===
On August 25, 1994, Kaoru appeared at a press conference, where Chigusa Nagayo announced the formation of the new Gaea Japan promotion. Kaoru was positioned as the second in command after Nagayo and helped her in training up-and-coming wrestlers in the promotion's dojo. The promotion held its first show on April 15, 1995, where Kaoru defeated Yasha Kurenai. During Gaea's first years, Kaoru wrestled as a member of the Gaea Seikigun ("regular army"), while also making sporadic appearances under a mask as Infernal Kaoru. Kaoru's first Gaea accomplishment took place on September 23, 1995, when she, Meiko Satomura and Tomoko Kuzumi won the Splash J & Running G tournament. Through Gaea Japan's working relationship with the World Championship Wrestling (WCW) promotion, Kaoru made her American debut on November 30, 1996, in Wheeling, West Virginia, defeating Sonoko Kato in the quarterfinals of a tournament to crown the inaugural WCW Women's Champion. Kaoru was eventually eliminated from the tournament in the semifinals by Akira Hokuto, who went on to win the entire tournament.

On December 17, 1999, Kaoru turned on the Gaea Seikigun and joined forces with Aja Kong, Lioness Asuka and Sonoko Kato to form the DorA (Dead or Alive) stable. As a member of the stable, Kaoru adopted a new wrestling style, combining her high-flying abilities with a hardcore wrestling style. On February 6, 2000, Kaoru defeated Toshiyo Yamada to become the number one contender to stablemate Aja Kong's AAAW Single Championship. Kaoru received her title shot seven days later, but was unable to dethrone the defending champion. Eventually the match led to the dissolution of the DorA stable. Meanwhile, Kaoru developed a storyline rivalry with Mayumi Ozaki. After defeating Ozaki with the use of a steel chain, Ozaki came back to defeat Kaoru in a Weapons match on May 14 at Gaea's fifth anniversary event to become the number one contender to the AAAW Single Championship.

On May 13, 2001, Kaoru aligned herself with Ozaki and her male manager Police to form the D-Fix stable, with the three attacking and declaring a war on Aja Kong. On July 29, Kaoru and Ozaki defeated Dynamite Kansai and Toshiyo Yamada in the finals to win a one night tag team tournament. A month later on August 26, Kaoru defeated Meiko Satomura in the finals of a tournament to become the number one contender to the AAAW Single Championship. However, due to Ozaki being the reigning AAAW Single Champion, Kaoru opted not to challenge for the title. On April 7, 2002, Kaoru and Ozaki defeated Chikayo Nagashima and Sugar Sato to win the AAAW Tag Team Championship. For most of 2002, Kaoru feuded with Meiko Satomura, which eventually led to a match on October 20, where Satomura and Ayako Hamada defeated D-Fix for the AAAW Tag Team Championship. On April 6, 2003, Kaoru and Ozaki were defeated by Chigusa Nagayo and Sakura Hirota in a Hair vs. Hair match and were both, as a result, shaved bald.

The following November Kaoru suffered an injury, which would sideline her for the next five months. During her hiatus, Ozaki picked Takako Inoue as Kaoru's replacement in D-Fix. Kaoru returned on April 30, 2004, teaming with Ozaki and Inoue in a six woman tag team match, where they defeated Devil Masami, Dynamite Kansai and Eagle Sawai. However, Kaoru's return was short-lived as just five days later, she broke the anterior cruciate ligament in her left knee and was again sidelined from in-ring competition. Kaoru returned from her injury on January 16, 2005, teaming with D-Fix's newest member, Ayako Hamada, to defeat Chikayo Nagashima and Lioness Asuka in a tag team match. However, the following month, Kaoru broke her femur and was once again sidelined. During her time out of the ring, Gaea Japan folded on April 10, 2005.

=== Freelancing (2005–2015) ===
Kaoru returned from her femur injury on April 15, 2006, at an independent event produced by Chigusa Nagayo. On September 1, 2006, Kaoru made her return to the United States to take part in the ChickFight VI tournament in San Francisco, California. On September 2, Kaoru first defeated Tiana Ringer in her first round match and then MsChif in her semifinal match. The following day, she was defeated in the finals of the tournament by Daizee Haze. On December 16, Kaoru wrestled at a Luchamania event in Minneapolis, Minnesota, teaming with Mini Abismo Negro in a losing effort against the team of La Parkita and Xóchitl Hamada.

Since the formation of Pro Wrestling Wave in August 2007, Kaoru has made semi-regular appearances for the promotion, including working its first ever event on August 26, where she defeated Shuu Shibutani. In May 2009, Kaoru took part in the first Catch the Wave tournament, during which she also captured DDT Pro-Wrestling's Ironman Heavymetalweight Championship, holding it less than a day on June 20. After a record of one win and one draw, Kaoru was eliminated from the tournament on August 10 with a loss against eventual tournament winner, Yumi Ohka. During the summer of 2009, Kaoru also made several appearances for Meiko Satomura's Sendai Girls' Pro Wrestling promotion, where she mainly worked with Hiren.

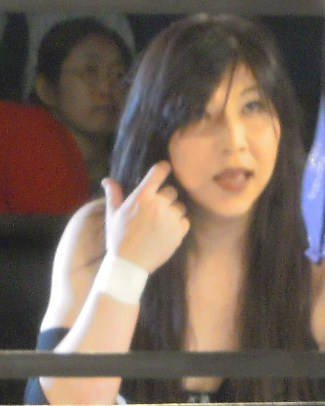
Kaoru in July 2010

On September 24, 2010, Kaoru made her debut for the Smash promotion at Smash.8, defeating Syuri in a hardcore match. She returned to the promotion on November 22 at Smash.10, where she teamed with Akira, Nagisa Nozaki and Scotty 2 Hotty to defeat Nunzio, Taka Michinoku, Tomoka Nakagawa and Toshie Uematsu in an eight-person tag team match. During a post-match interview, Kaoru got into an argument with Akira, which led to the two agreeing to face each other in a hardcore match. On December 24 at Happening Eve, Kaoru defeated Akira in an intergender hardcore match, her final appearance for Smash.

On December 11, 2013, it was announced that Kaoru would be returning to the ring and wrestling her first match in three years on March 22, 2014, at an independent event produced by Chigusa Nagayo. In her return match, Kaoru teamed Dump Matsumoto and Yoshiko in a six-woman tag team match, where they were defeated by Nagayo, Kagetsu and Takumi Iroha. Later in the main event, Kaoru teamed with Ayako Hamada and Takako Inoue to defeat Meiko Satomura, Shinobu Kandori and Toshie Uematsu, pinning Uematsu for the win. On April 6, Kaoru returned to Pro Wrestling Wave, teaming with Yumi Ohka to defeat Kyoko Kimura and Shuu Shibutani in a main event tag team match. On April 25, Kaoru made her debut for Wrestling New Classic (WNC), the follow-up promotion to Smash, teaming with Crazy Mary in a tag team match, where they were defeated by Kyoko Kimura and Syuri. Four days later, Kaoru made her debut for the World Woman Pro-Wrestling Diana promotion, forming a new stable with Mima Shimoda and Takako Inoue and starting a three-way war with Yumiko Hotta's Bousou-gun and Kyoko Inoue's Seikigun stables. On May 6, Kaoru made her debut for Osaka Joshi Pro Wrestling, defeating Fairy Nipponbashi. On August 17, Kaoru returned to JWP Joshi Puroresu, where she teamed with Mima Shimoda to unsuccessfully challenge Command Bolshoi and Kyoko Kimura for the Daily Sports Women's Tag Team and JWP Tag Team Championships. On October 26, Kaoru and Shimoda defeated Kyoko Inoue and Tomoko Watanabe to win Diana's WWWD World Tag Team Championship. They lost the title to Jaguar Yokota and Sareee in their first defense on December 23.

=== Oz Academy (2007–2013) ===
In June 2007, Kaoru began working regularly for Mayumi Ozaki's Oz Academy promotion. In her return match, Kaoru teamed with Aja Kong to defeat Dynamite Kansai and Mizuki Endo in a tag team match. After teaming with Kong for two months, Kaoru reunited with Ozaki and Police on August 16 to reform the D-Fix stable. When they were joined the following year by Hiren, Manami Toyota, Mika Nishio and Takako Inoue, the stable was renamed Ozaki-gun and started a storyline rivalry with Aja Kong's Jungle Jack 21 stable. On August 10, 2008, Kaoru and Ozaki defeated Carlos Amano and Dynamite Kansai in a Two Out of Three Falls Hair vs. Hair match to win the Oz Academy Tag Team Championship. On September 11, Kaoru entered a round-robin tournament to determine the number one contender to the Oz Academy Openweight Championship. After two wins and two draws, Kaoru was defeated in her final match on November 24 by Sonoko Kato and, as a result, failed to qualify for the finals of the tournament, with Ozaki overtaking her in the standings in the final round-robin match of the tournament. On February 5, 2009, Kaoru and Ozaki lost the Oz Academy Tag Team Championship to Jungle Jack 21's Aja Kong and Hiroyo Matsumoto in their first defense. Kaoru and Ozaki would regain the title from Chikayo Nagashima and Sonoko Kato on June 3. After a successful title defense against Akino and Ran Yu-Yu, Kaoru and Ozaki lost the Tag Team Championship back to Nagashima and Kato on August 2. After Kaoru and Ozaki failed to regain the title on September 6, Ozaki and the rest of Ozaki-gun turned on Kaoru and kicked her out of the stable.

On December 23, Kaoru and Mayumi Ozaki faced each other in their first singles match, a "Serial Killing" hardcore match, where a wrestler would have to earn two back-to-back pinfall or submission victories to win the match. In a match, which featured outside interference from Ozaki-gun, Kaoru won the first and third falls, before submitting to Ozaki in the fourth fall. Finally, in the fifth fall of the match, Ozaki dropped Kaoru with a brainbuster off a ladder through a barbed-wire board to win the fall and the match. In order to reduce Ozaki-gun's numbers advantage over her, Kaoru began teaming with Jungle Jack 21 in 2010, though not officially joining the stable. After defeating Ozaki-gun member Yumi Ohka with Mayumi Ozaki's signature Ozakick on May 16, Kaoru defeated another former stablemate, Takako Inoue, on June 13 to become the number one contender to the Oz Academy Openweight Championship. On July 11, Kaoru defeated Carlos Amano to win the Oz Academy Openweight Championship, becoming the promotion's top champion. She made her first title defense on August 22, defeating Mayumi Ozaki in a Last Woman Standing match. Her second defense took place on November 3, when she defeated Takako Inoue. On February 19, 2011, Kaoru made her third successful defense, defeating Jungle Jack 21 member Ran Yu-Yu. On April 10, Kaoru, Aja Kong and Mayumi Ozaki faced each other in a three-way two-fall match, where Kaoru put her title and Kong and Ozaki the futures of their respective stables on the line. During the first fall, Kaoru fractured her calcaneus when diving out of the ring onto Kong and was unable to continue the match, resulting in the referee declaring the match a no contest and stripping Kaoru of the Oz Academy Openweight Championship, ending her reign at 273 days. Kaoru underwent surgery four days later. Her recovery was slowed down by her developing an osteomyelitis.

=== Marvelous (2015–2022) ===
On January 18, 2015, it was announced that Maeda had signed with Chigusa Nagayo's Marvelous promotion, officially ending her days as a freelancer. On August 23, Kaoru made her debut for World Wonder Ring Stardom, when she entered the 2015 5★Star GP as a representative of Marvelous. She finished the tournament on September 13 with a record of three wins, one draw and one loss, failing to advance to the finals due to losing to Kairi Hojo in the head-to-head match. On October 16, 2016, Kaoru and Dash Chisako defeated Hikaru Shida and Syuri to win the vacant Sendai Girls World Tag Team Championship. They lost the title to Shida and Syuri in a rematch on November 23. Kaoru and Chisako regained the vacant title on September 24, 2017, by defeating Alex Lee and Mika Shirahime. On December 28, 2020, Kaoru announced that she will retire in August 2021 from professional wrestling, as she would reach her 35th anniversary in wrestling at that month.

== Championships and accomplishments ==
- All Japan Women's Pro-Wrestling
  - AJW Tag Team Championship (2 times) – with Mika Takahashi
- DDT Pro-Wrestling
  - Ironman Heavymetalweight Championship (1 time)
- Gaea Japan
  - AAAW Tag Team Championship (1 time) – with Mayumi Ozaki
  - AAAW Single Championship Contender Tournament (2001)
  - Splash J and Running G (1995) – with Meiko Satomura and Tomoko Kuzumi
  - Tag Team Tournament (2001) – with Mayumi Ozaki
- JWP Joshi Puroresu
  - JWP Tag Team Championship (1 time) – with Hikari Fukuoka
- Ōyama Pro Wrestling Festival
  - Ōyama Women's Championship (1 time)
- Oz Academy
  - Oz Academy Openweight Championship (1 time)
  - Oz Academy Tag Team Championship (2 times) – with Mayumi Ozaki
  - Best Wizard Award (1 time)
    - Best Singles Match Award (2010) vs. Mayumi Ozaki, Last Woman Standing match, August 22
- Sendai Girls' Pro Wrestling
  - Sendai Girls Tag Team Championship (2 times) – with Dash Chisako
- Universal Pro-Wrestling
  - JCTV Women's Championship (1 time)
- World Woman Pro-Wrestling Diana
  - WWWD World Tag Team Championship (1 time) – with Mima Shimoda

== Luchas de Apuestas record ==
Winner (wager)	Loser (wager)	Location	Event	Date	Notes
La Diabólica (mask)	Kaoru (mask)	Mexico City	Live event	March 21, 1993	
Chigusa Nagayo (hair) and Sakura Hirota (hair)	Kaoru (hair) and Mayumi Ozaki (hair)	Yokohama, Kanagawa, Japan	Limit Break 2003	April 6, 2003	
Kaoru (hair)	Dynamite Kansai (hair)	Bunkyo, Tokyo, Japan	Plum no Hanasaku Oz no Kuni 2008	August 10, 2008	(Note: Two Out of Three Falls match, where Kaoru and Mayumi Ozaki faced Kansai and Carlos Amano for the Oz Academy Tag Team Championship)
