= Dash Chisako =

Japanese professional wrestler

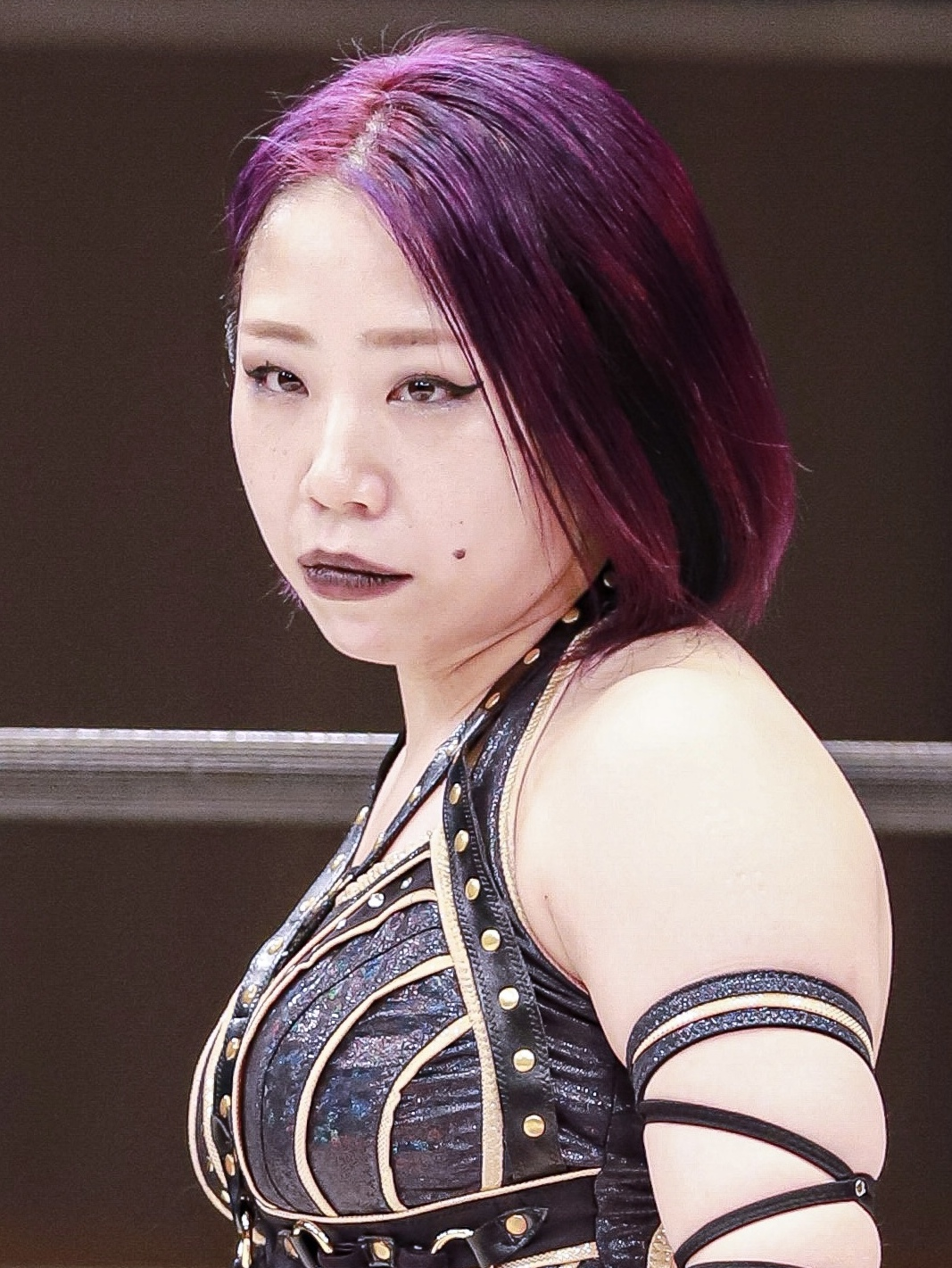
- Chisako in July 2023

Personal information
- Born: Chisako Jumonji; August 24, 1988 (age 37) Sendai, Miyagi
- Family: Sendai Sachiko (sister)

Professional wrestling career
- Ring name(s): Chisako Kanari; Dash Chisako
- Billed height: 1.51 m (4 ft 11 1/2 in)
- Billed weight: 56 kg (123 lb)
- Debut: July 9, 2006

Chisako Jumonji (十文字 知佐子, Jūmonji Chisako; born August 24, 1988), better known by her ring name Dash Chisako (DASH・チサコ, DASH Chisako), is a Japanese professional wrestler. She was trained by Meiko Satomura and has worked for her Sendai Girls' Pro Wrestling promotion since her debut in July 2006. She is currently inactive due to pregnancy.

For the first ten years of her career, Chisako was part of a tag team with her younger sister Sachiko, who worked under the ring name Sendai Sachiko, with the two winning the Sendai Girls World Tag Team Championship, Ice Ribbon's International Ribbon Tag Team Championship, JWP Joshi Puroresu's JWP and Daily Sports Women's Tag Team Championships and World Woman Pro-Wrestling Diana's WWWD World Tag Team Championship as well as JWP's 2013 Tag League the Best tournament. Sachiko retired from professional wrestling in January 2016, forcing Chisako to start a singles career.

In December 2017, Chisako won her first singles championship, the Pure-J Openweight Championship. Chisako has also wrestled in the United States for the Chikara promotion, where she won the 2016 King of Trios tournament as part of Team Sendai Girls.

== Professional wrestling career ==
=== Sendai Girls' Pro Wrestling (2005–present) ===
==== 2000s ====
On October 2, 2005, Jumonji, along with her sister Sachiko, took part in a professional wrestling audition held by Meiko Satomura. After passing the audition, both of the Jumonji sisters were admitted to the first training class of Satomura's new Sendai Girls' Pro Wrestling promotion, and began training under her the following December. Jumonji made her professional wrestling debut on July 9, 2006, at Sendai Girls' first ever event, where she, working under the ring name Chisako Kanari, was defeated by Dynamite Kansai via referee stoppage. For the next six months, Kanari was unable to pick up her first win, instead losing to the likes of Chikayo Nagashima, Mariko Yoshida and Meiko Satomura and wrestling her sister to a time limit draw. Finally, on January 10, 2007, Kanari picked up her first win, defeating Yurie Kaneko. The following summer, the Jumonji sisters began regularly wrestling together as a tag team, and on September 8, both of them were given new ring names, when Chisako began wrestling as Dash Chisako and her sister as Sendai Sachiko. In late 2007, the sisters also began making appearances for Ibuki and JWP Joshi Puroresu, with one notable match seeing the Jumonji sisters defeating the Shirai sisters (Io and Mio) on December 31, 2007, at JWP's 5th Junior All Star event.

Following the loss, both Chisako and Sachiko began concentrating on their singles careers, however, Chisako again went on a losing streak and was not able to win another match, before reuniting with her sister on June 27, 2008. On December 21, the Jumonji sisters made it to the finals of a one night tag team tournament, before losing to the team of Devil Masami and Ryo Mizunami. In May 2009, Chisako was forced to restart her singles career, when Sachiko suffered a broken fibula and torn ligaments in her ankle and was sidelined from in-ring competition for ten months. The rest of the year, Chisako feuded with Misaki Ohata, whom she faced in matches in both Sendai Girls' and Ibuki.

==== 2010s ====
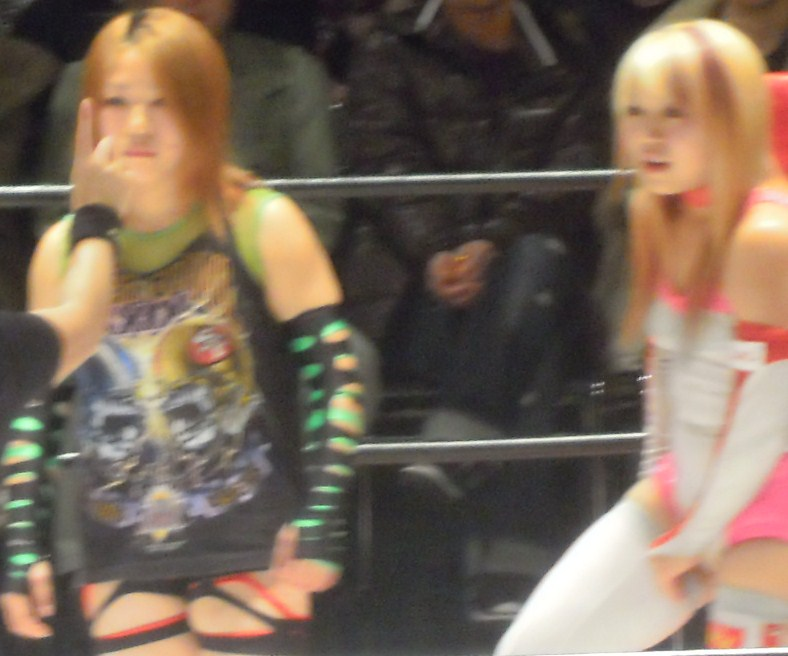
The Jumonji sisters in December 2010

In early 2010, Chisako also began working for the Oz Academy promotion, making her debut on March 14.

On April 9, 2010, Sachiko made her return, losing to Chisako in the first round of the 2nd Battle Field tournament. Later that same day, Chisako was eliminated from the tournament in the second round by Yoshiko Tamura. The following month, the Jumonji sisters reformed their tag team, while Chisako debuted a new look, inspired by her favorite professional wrestler, Jeff Hardy. On September 23, 2010, Chisako made her debut for Ice Ribbon, taking part in the interpromotional rivalry between Sendai Girls' and Ice Ribbon, when she, Sachiko, Hiren, Kagetsu and Ryo Mizunami teamed in a ten-woman captain's fall tag team match, where they defeated Makoto, Hikaru Shida, Kazumi Shimouna, Natsuki☆Taiyo and Tsukasa Fujimoto. From March to May 2011, Chisako worked exclusively for JWP, when Sendai Girls' went inactive in the aftermath of the Tōhoku earthquake and tsunami. On July 7, Chisako returned to Sendai Girls', working at the promotion's first event since the disaster. After defeating the Lovely Butchers (Hamuko Hoshi and Mochi Miyagi) at an Ice Ribbon event on August 21, 2011, the Jumonji sisters were invited to take part in a tournament to determine the new International Ribbon Tag Team Champions. On September 24, Chisako and Sachiko entered the one night tournament, first defeating Hikari Minami and Riho in the first round and then the Lovely Butchers in the semifinals. Finally, Chisako and Sachiko defeated the team of Manami Toyota and Tsukushi in the finals to win the vacant International Ribbon Tag Team Championship, the first title for both of the sisters. The Jumonji sisters made their first title defense on October 15, wrestling Tsukasa Fujimoto and Tsukushi to a time limit draw, which meant that they were stripped of the title, which was again declared vacant. On October 27, both Chisako and Sachiko were entered into Team Sendai in the Joshi Puroresu Dantai Taikou Flash tournament, a single-elimination tournament, where different joshi promotions battled each other. In their first round match, Team Sendai, which besides the Jumonji sisters included Kagetsu, Meiko Satomura and Miyako Morino, defeated Team Ice Ribbon, which included Emi Sakura, Hikari Minami, Hikaru Shida, Tsukasa Fujimoto and Tsukushi, with Chisako pinning Tsukushi for the win. As each round progressed in the tournament, the number of participants in each team was reduced, which meant that neither Chisako nor Sachiko wrestled in the remaining matches, but were ringside for the finals, where Kagetsu and Satomura defeated Team Stardom's Nanae Takahashi and Yoshiko to win the tournament for Team Sendai.

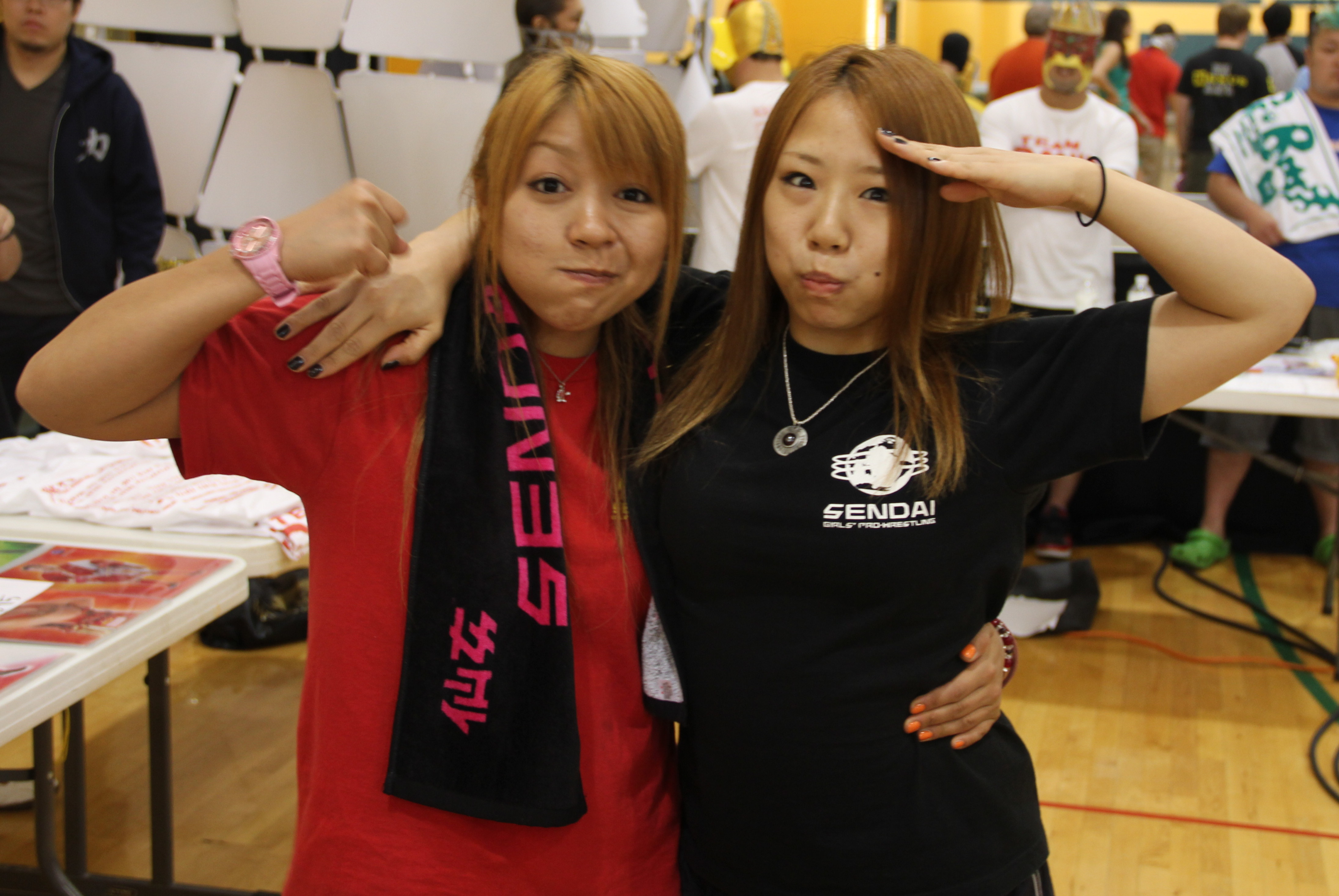
The Jumonji sisters in September 2012

From January to March 2012, the Jumonji sisters took part in JWP's Tag League the Best, contested for the JWP and Daily Sports Women's Tag Team Championships. After two wins and two losses, Chisako and Sachiko failed to advance to the finals of the tournament. On March 12, Sendai Girls' Pro Wrestling presented a special exhibition tag team match at a Dragon Gate event in Sendai, in which the Jumonji sisters were defeated by Kagetsu and Meiko Satomura. On March 19, Chikara announced that Chisako, along with Kagetsu, Meiko Satomura and Sendai Sachiko, would be making her American debut for the promotion during its tenth anniversary weekend in May. During the first night of the weekend on May 19 in Easton, Pennsylvania, the Jumonji sisters were defeated in a tag team match by Kagetsu and Satomura. The following day in Manhattan, New York, the Jumonji sisters defeated the Bravado Brothers (Harlem and Lancelot) in an intergender tag team match. On June 25, Sendai Girls' held its final event in the promotion's home arena, Zepp Sendai, which was scheduled to close down the following month. In the main event of the show, Chisako and Sachiko picked up a major win over the veteran tag team of Kyoko Inoue and Manami Toyota. On July 25, Chikara announced that Chisako would be returning to the promotion in September to participate in the 2012 King of Trios tournament in Easton, Pennsylvania, where she formed a trio with Meiko Satomura and Sendai Sachiko. Team Sendai Girls wrestled in the opening match of the tournament on September 14 and advanced to the quarter-finals after a win over a team, which included assailAnt and two thirds of the previous year's King of Trios winners, The Colony; Fire Ant and Green Ant, with Chisako scoring the pinfall win over Green Ant. The following day, Team Sendai Girls picked up another big win, this time over the trio of Jigsaw, Manami Toyota and Mike Quackenbush, to advance to the semifinals of the tournament. On the third and final day of the tournament, Team Sendai Girls was eliminated from the tournament in the semifinals by Team ROH (Mike Bennett, Matt Jackson and Nick Jackson).

On December 24, the Jumonji sisters returned to JWP, wrestling in a tag team match, where they were defeated by Kay Lee Ray and Leon. On February 17, 2013, Chisako and Sachiko entered JWP's 2013 Tag League the Best tournament, defeating Manami Katsu and Rabbit Miu in their opening round-robin match. On March 3, the Jumonji sisters made their debut for Michinoku Pro Wrestling, losing to Kagetsu and Meiko Satomura in a "Sendai Girls' offer match". Chisako and Sachiko continued their Tag League the Best tournament on March 10 with a draw against Kazuki and Sachie Abe. On March 31, the sisters qualified for the finals of the tournament, when Kazuki and Abe failed to defeat Katsu and Miu in their final round-robin match. On April 7, Chisako and Sachiko defeated Hanako Nakamori and Morii in the finals to win the 2013 Tag League the Best and become the number one contenders to the Daily Sports Women's Tag Team and JWP Tag Team Championships. The sisters received their title shot on April 14, but were defeated by the defending champions, Kayoko Haruyama and Tsubasa Kuragaki. During early 2013, Chisako also started a rare singles rivalry with Mio Shirai, which built to a match between the two at a Sendai Girls' event on May 19, where Shirai was victorious. The two had a rematch on July 29, where Shirai again picked up the win. On November 10, Chisako and Sachiko entered World Wonder Ring Stardom's 2013 Goddesses of Stardom Tag Tournament, but were defeated in their first round match by the previous year's tournament winners, Kawasaki Katsushika Saikyou Densetsu (Natsuki☆Taiyo and Yoshiko). On November 24, the Jumonji sisters returned to JWP Joshi Puroresu, defeating The☆Wanted!? (Kazuki and Sachie Abe) in the first round of a tournament for the vacant JWP and Daily Sports Women's Tag Team Championships. On December 15, the Jumonji sisters defeated Mascara Voladoras (Leon and Ray) in the finals to win the tournament and become the new JWP and Daily Sports Women's Tag Team Champions. However, after Sachiko was sidelined with a knee injury, she and Chisako were forced to vacate the titles on April 11, 2014.

Forced to restart her singles career, Chisako immediately challenged Arisa Nakajima to a match for JWP's top title, the JWP Openweight Championship. Chisako earned her title shot on June 8 by defeating Kayoko Haruyama, Rabbit Miu and Kazuki to win a one-day single-elimination tournament held over two shows. Chisako received her title shot on July 13, but was defeated by Nakajima. On August 30 and 31, Chisako took part in two shows promoted by the Inoki Genome Federation (IGF) in Pyongyang, North Korea. At the first event, Chisako teamed with Meiko Satomura in a tag team match, where they were defeated by Kyoko Kimura and Ray and at the second event with Kimura in a tag team match, where they were defeated by Ray and Satomura. From August 24 to September 23, Chisako took part in World Wonder Ring Stardom's 2014 5★Star GP, where she finished with a record of two wins and three losses, failing to advance from her block. On April 5, 2015, following Sachiko's return from her injury, she and Chisako returned to JWP to receive their rematch for the JWP and Daily Sports Women's Tag Team Championships, but were defeated by the defending champions, Leon and Ray.

Another rematch took place on July 26 and saw Chisako and Sachiko defeat Ray and Leon to win the JWP and Daily Sports Women's Tag Team Championships for the second time. On September 16, Chisako and Sachiko won another tag team title, when they defeated Meiko Tanaka and Sareee to win the vacant World Woman Pro-Wrestling Diana (WWWD) World Tag Team Championship. On September 22, Chisako and Sachiko made their first successful defense of the JWP and Daily Sports Women's Tag Team Championships against Kayoko Haruyama and Tsubasa Kuragaki. The following day, Chisako and Sachiko failed in their attempt to capture another tag team title, World Wonder Ring Stardom's Goddesses of Stardom Championship, from Io Shirai and Mayu Iwatani. On October 11, Chisako and Sachiko defeated Kyoko Kimura and Takumi Iroha in a decision match to become the inaugural Sendai Girls World Tag Team Champions, becoming "quadruple crown tag team champions" in the process. On December 27, Chisako and Sachiko lost the JWP and Daily Sports Women's Tag Team Championships to Arisa Nakajima and Tsukasa Fujimoto. On January 17, 2016, Chisako and Sachiko successfully defended the Sendai Girls World Tag Team Championship against Chihiro Hashimoto and Mika Iwata. However, immediately after their win, the two relinquished the title due to Sachiko retiring from professional wrestling later that day. In the main event of the show, Chisako won an eleven-woman battle royal, pinning her sister to win the match and end her career. Chisako and Sachiko held possession of the WWWD World Tag Team Championship belts until February 28, when Meiko Satomura returned them to Diana.

From April 10 to June 2, Chisako took part in Pro Wrestling Wave's 2016 Catch the Wave tournament. After winning her round-robin block with a record of two wins and one draw, she was eliminated from the tournament in the quarterfinals by Ryo Mizunami. On September 2, Chisako returned to Chikara to once again represent Sendai Girls in the King of Trios tournament, this time teaming with Cassandra Miyagi and Meiko Satomura. They defeated Heidi Lovelace, Hype Rockwell and Race Jaxon in their first round match. The following day, Team Sendai Girls defeated The Colony (Fire Ant, Silver Ant and Soldier Ant), with Chisako submitting Silver for the win, to advance to the semifinals of the tournament. On September 4, Team Sendai Girls defeated The Warriors Three (Oleg the Usurper, Princess KimberLee and ThunderFrog) to advance to the finals of the tournament, where, later that same day, they defeated their compatriots, Team JWP (Command Bolshoi, Hanako Nakamori and Manami Katsu), to win the 2016 King of Trios, becoming the first female wrestlers to win the tournament. On October 16, Chisako regained the Sendai Girls World Tag Team Championship, when she and her new tag team partner Kaoru defeated Hikaru Shida and Syuri for the vacant title. They lost the title to Shida and Syuri in a rematch on November 23. Chisako regained the title from Shida and Syuri on July 15, 2017, with new partner Cassandra Miyagi. However, just six days later, Miyagi announced that she was no longer interested in teaming with Chisako and relinquished the title. On September 1, Chisako, Miyagi and Satomura returned to Chikara to defend their "Queen of Trios" crown in the 2017 King of Trios, which this time took place in Wolverhampton, England. In their opening round match, the trio, billed collectively as "House Sendai Girls", defeated House Xyberhawx (Nytehawk, Razerhawk and Sylverhawk). After wins over House Seven Seas (Cajun Crawdad, Hermit Crab and Merlok) and Casa Dorada (Juan Francisco de Coronado, Cornelius Crummels and Sonny Defarge), House Sendai Girls advanced to their second consecutive King of Trios final, where, on September 3, they were defeated by House Strong Style (Pete Dunne, Trent Seven and Tyler Bate). On September 24, Chisako and Kaoru defeated Alex Lee and Mika Shirahime to win the vacant Sendai Girls World Tag Team Championship.

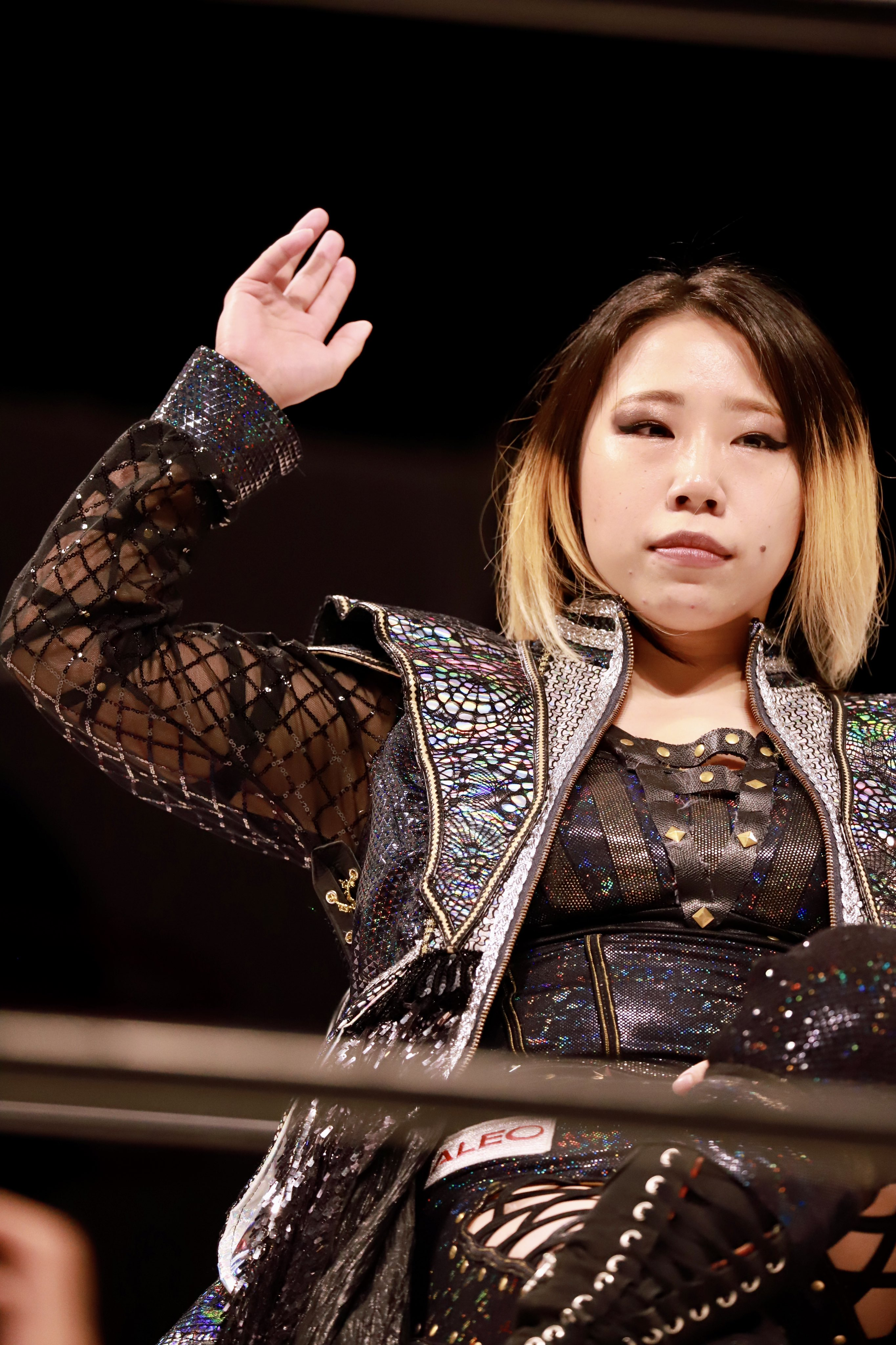
Chisako in June 2021

On December 17, 2017, Chisako took part in the first Hair vs. Hair match in Japanese women's professional wrestling in seven years, where she defeated Hanako Nakamori to win the Pure-J Openweight Championship, her first singles title.

==== 2020s ====
On November 17, 2024, Chisako defeated Mika Iwata to win the Sendai Girls World Championship for the first time. On December 8, Chisako lost the title to Meiko Satomura, ending her reign at 21 days.

== Personal life ==
On May 7, 2026, Sendai Girls' Pro Wrestling announced that Chisako is pregnant.

== Championships and accomplishments ==
- Chikara
  - King of Trios (2016) – with Cassandra Miyagi and Meiko Satomura
- DDT Pro-Wrestling
  - KO-D 6-Man Tag Team Championship (1 time) – with Chihiro Hashimoto and Meiko Satomura
- Ice Ribbon
  - International Ribbon Tag Team Championship (1 time) – with Sendai Sachiko
  - Yokohama Ribbon Tag Team Tournament (2011) – with Sendai Sachiko
- JWP Joshi Puroresu
  - Daily Sports Women's Tag Team Championship (2 times) – with Sendai Sachiko
  - JWP Tag Team Championship (2 times) – with Sendai Sachiko
  - JWP Openweight Championship Next Challenger Determination 1Day Tournament (2014)
  - JWP Tag League the Best (2013) – with Sendai Sachiko
  - JWP Tag Team and Daily Sports Women's Tag Team Championship Tournament (2013) – with Sendai Sachiko
  - 5th Junior All Star Fighting Spirit Award (2007) – with Sendai Sachiko
  - JWP Year-End Award (1 time)
    - Enemy Award (2015) – with Sendai Sachiko
- Pro Wrestling Illustrated
  - Ranked No. 132 of the top 250 female wrestlers in the PWI Women's 250 in 2025
- Pure-J
  - Pure-J Openweight Championship (1 time)
  - Pure-J Year-End Award (2 times)
    - Best Bout Award (2017) vs. Hanako Nakamori on December 17
- Sendai Girls' Pro Wrestling
  - Sendai Girls World Championship (1 time)
  - Sendai Girls Tag Team Championship (7 times) – with Sendai Sachiko (1), Kaoru (2), Cassandra Miyagi (1) and Hiroyo Matsumoto (3)
  - Joshi Puroresu Dantai Taikou Flash Tournament (2011) – with Hiren, Kagetsu, Meiko Satomura, Miyako Morino, Ryo Mizunami and Sendai Sachiko
- World Woman Pro-Wrestling Diana
  - WWWD World Tag Team Championship (1 time) – with Sendai Sachiko

== Luchas de Apuestas record ==
Winner (wager)	Loser (wager)	Location	Event	Date	Notes
Dash Chisako (hair)	Hanako Nakamori (hair)	Tokyo, Japan	Pure-J Climax	December 17, 2017	
