= Manami Toyota =

Japanese professional wrestler (born 1971)

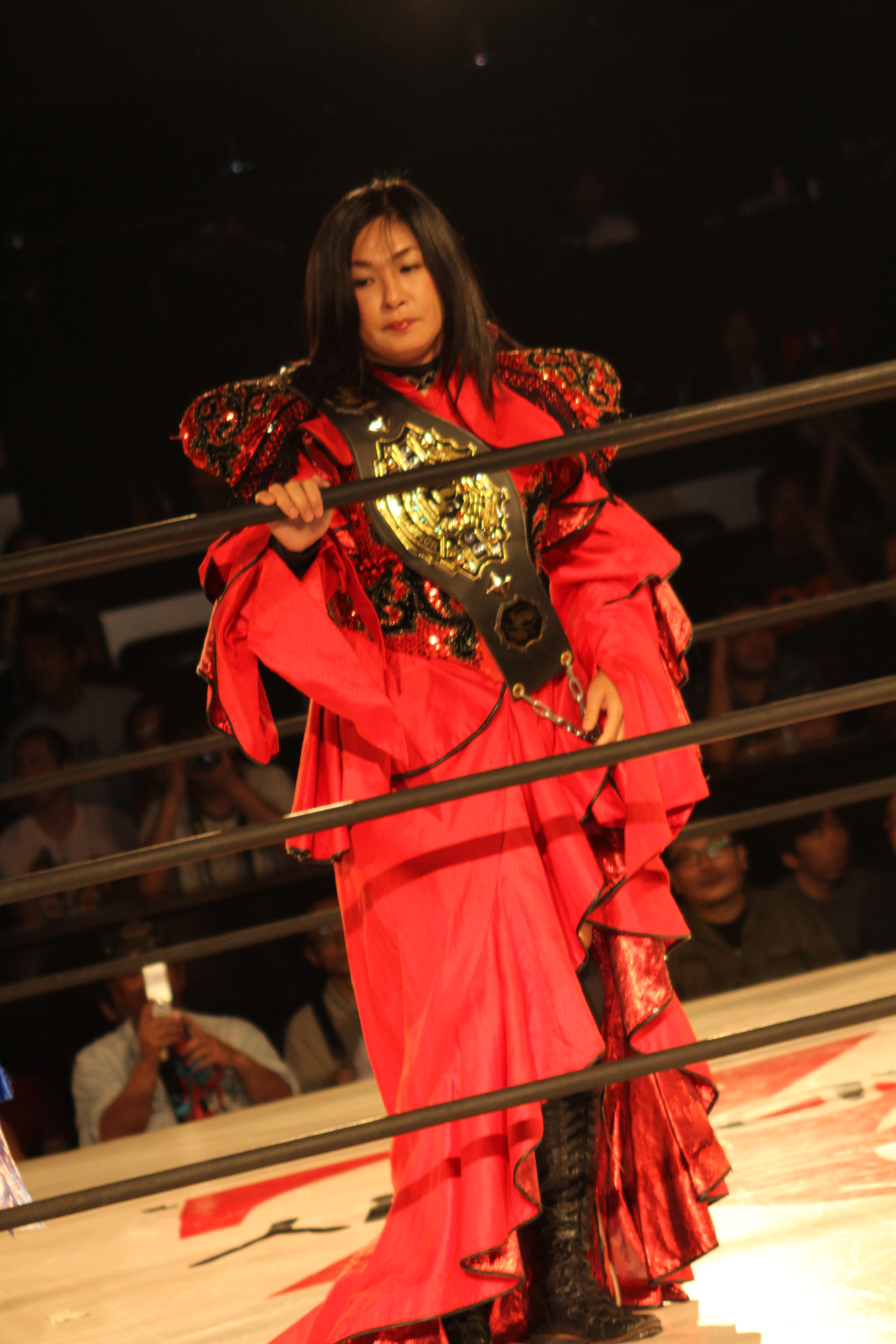
- Toyota in August 2010

Personal information
- Born: March 2, 1971 (age 55) Masuda, Shimane, Japan

Professional wrestling career
- Ring name: Manami Toyota
- Billed height: 1.67 m (5 ft 6 in)
- Billed weight: 68 kg (150 lb)
- Trained by: Jaguar Yokota
- Debut: August 5, 1987
- Retired: November 3, 2017

Manami Toyota (豊田 真奈美, Toyota Manami; born March 2, 1971) is a Japanese retired professional wrestler, best known for her work with All Japan Women's Pro-Wrestling (AJW). She is widely considered to be one of the greatest female professional wrestlers of all time.

Following AJW's closure, Toyota continued to work in other joshi promotions such as GAEA Japan and NEO Japan Ladies Pro-Wrestling.

== Professional wrestling career ==
=== All Japan Women's Pro-Wrestling (1987–2002) ===
Manami Toyota made her professional wrestling debut on August 5, 1987, at the age of 16, in a singles match against Sachiko Nakamura. Her big break came in her second year, on the first Wrestlemarinpiad show at Yokohama Arena, on May 6, 1989. Teaming with Mima Shimoda as the Tokyo Sweethearts, she defeated Etsuko Mita and Toshiyo Yamada in a match that nearly stole the card from the more established veterans. The bout had all the basic ingredients that made Toyota a star, including flashy moves, fast and frequent tags, double-team moves, and a long series of dramatic near falls. When the bout was released as part of a four-hour commercial tape, Toyota became recognized as a wrestler to watch.

Toyota won her first title on November 18, 1989, when she defeated Mika Takahashi for the AJW Championship. She defended the title three times, including one defense against her future rival Kyoko Inoue (on August 1, 1990), before vacating it on September 1. The following month (October 7 in Tokyo) she challenged Bison Kimura for the All Pacific Championship and emerged victorious. However, she only managed to defend the title once before losing to Suzuka Minami on March 17, 1991.

Parallel to this success ran Toyota’s feud with future tag-team partner Toshiyo Yamada. Initially, following Tokyo Sweethearts' success, the AJW braintrust felt they could well be the new Beauty Pair or Crush Gals. However, Toyota's real chemistry came not with Shimoda but with Yamada, whose style was unlike Toyota's and provided more of a contrast. Yamada was a slightly built, short-haired, kicking specialist, who idolized both Chigusa Nagayo and Akira Maeda. Unlike other wrestlers who rely on kicks and submissions, Yamada could also work the rapid-paced matches and was accomplished at building to near-falls with repeated kick-outs at the last possible moment. To begin with, however, Toyota and Yamada were opponents rather than partners. Between 1989 and 1991 they wrestled many times. At the start of 1992, the two won their first tag team championship when they defeated KAORU and Lady Apache in Tokyo on January 19 for the UWA Women's World Tag Team Championship.

Their singles feud was not yet over, however, and it reached a climax on August 15, 1992 in a hair vs. hair match. The bout was a dramatic one, not least due to what occurred after the match was over. Toyota, even though she had won the match, did not want Yamada to get her head shaved, and had to be forcefully restrained by five prelim girls, who eventually forced her back to the mat. In respect of the match conditions, Yamada wanted her head shaved and went ahead with the stipulation. Soon after this match the two stars once again teamed up to win their first WWWA World Tag Team Championship in March 1992, defeating Jungle Jack (Aja Kong and Bison Kimura) in Tokyo. On November 26, at AJW’s Dreamrush show Toyota and Yamada defended their WWWA Tag Team titles against Dynamite Kansai and Mayumi Ozaki in a 2/3 Falls match. In April of that year, Toyota furthered her singles career by defeating rival Kyoko Inoue on April 25 in Yokohama for the IWA Singles Championship. Toyota defended that title eight times over the course of three years, before losing it to Reggie Bennett on May 15, 1995. It was at around this time that Toyota's talent was being compared to most male competitors, as one of the best wrestlers in the world.

At Dreamslam II, on April 11, 1993 Toyota and Yamada fought a rematch against JWP Joshi Puroresu's Kansai and Ozaki in yet another highly rated two of three falls encounter. This time, however, Toyota and Yamada were on the losing side, and Kansai and Ozaki got their revenge. The feud concluded at AJW’s St. Battle Final event, on December 6, 1993, where Toyota and Yamada regained their tag titles.

On August 24, 1994 Toyota once again squared off against Kyoko Inoue and defeated her to unify the IWA and All Pacific Singles Championships. Toyota’s run with the two titles was not to last long. On October 9, Inoue gained a measure of revenge against Toyota, as Kyoko and her partner Takako Inoue (no relation) won the WWWA Tag Team Championship from Toyota and Yamada. Toyota then vacated her All Pacific Championship, prior to her first WWWA Heavyweight Championship match against the monstrous Aja Kong at AJW’s Queendom III show, on March 26, 1995. The match saw Toyota reach the summit of AJW when she won and became the 39th WWWA World Single Champion. On May 7, Toyota defended her crown against arch-rival Kyoko Inoue at the Korakuen Hall, where the two fought to a 60-minute time limit draw. Despite piledrivers on the floor, German suplexes off the top rope, and multiple finishers, neither combatant was able to secure outright victory. Nonetheless, Toyota retained, and the match was voted Match of the Year for 1995 in the Wrestling Observer Newsletter. Manami Toyota is also the only woman to have competed in 13 matches that were given a 5-Star rating by the Wrestling Observer.

The following month, Toyota lost the WWWA Championship to former champion Aja Kong, on June 27. Toyota soon recovered from the loss. In 1995, she won the AJW Grand Prix tournament, securing her position as the number one contender for the WWWA Championship. Before she received her title opportunity, she faced Akira Hokuto at AJW's Destiny show on September 2, 1995. On December 4, she finally received her title shot and defeated then-champion Dynamite Kansai to become a two-time world champion. Over the next 12 months, Toyota made three successful defenses of her WWWA title. In December 1996 she came up against long term rival Kyoko Inoue and lost in a match that saw the All Pacific and IWA Women's World titles unified with the WWWA Title.

On November 28, 1998, Toyota faced the legendary Chigusa Nagayo in a one-time-only legends bout that saw arguably the two best female wrestlers ever go at it. Nagayo came out victorious in a 15-minute match.

=== GAEA Japan (2002–2004) ===
Toyota was brought in by Aja Kong to Chigusa Nagayo's Gaea Japan wrestling group. She feuded with her old partner Toshiyo Yamada, as well as Dynamite Kansai. She competed there from 2002 to 2004 before moving on.

=== Freelance (2004–2017) ===
Toyota put her wrestler career on hiatus after her August 2007 Tribute Show, where she wrestled in every match. She returned to action in the following year. On a Wrestling Observer poll taken on March 20, 2009, Toyota was voted as the greatest female wrestler of all time, garnering 31% of the vote.

On March 17, 2017, Toyota announced that she would retire from professional wrestling on November 3 with her final match at a special thirty-anniversary show in Japan. Toyota's retirement event featured a series of one-minute time limit matches, which Toyota finished with a record of 12 wins, 29 draws and 10 losses. Toyota then had her retirement match with no time limit against her hand-picked successor, Tsukasa Fujimoto, which she won with the Japanese Ocean Cyclone Suplex. However, Toyota demanded a rematch and went on to defeat Fujimoto again with the Japanese Ocean Queen Bee Bomb. Toyota and Fujimoto then had a third match, where Fujimoto was victorious with Toyota's own Japanese Ocean Cyclone Suplex, bringing Toyota's thirty-year career to an end.

=== Chikara (2010–2012) ===
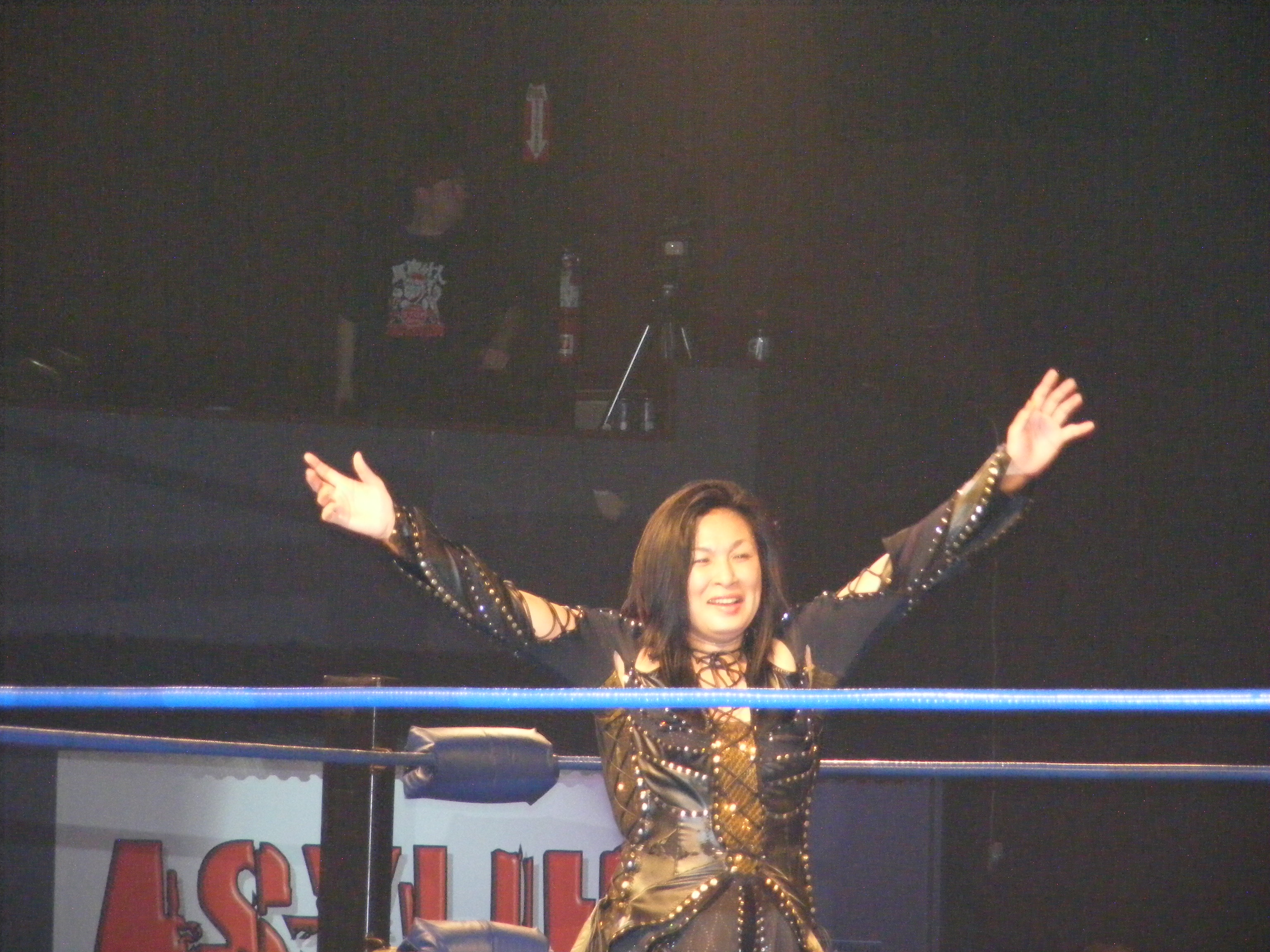
Toyota in Chikara in April 2011

On July 25, 2010, it was announced that Toyota would make her first wrestling appearance in the United States, wrestling for the Chikara promotion in September. On September 18, 2010, in Baltimore, Maryland, Toyota defeated Daizee Haze in her first match on American soil. The following day in Brooklyn, New York, Toyota and Mike Quackenbush defeated the Bruderschaft des Kreuzes (Claudio Castagnoli and Sara Del Rey) in a tag team match. On February 10, 2011, Chikara announced that Toyota would be returning to the promotion in April to take part in the 2011 King of Trios tournament, where she would team up with Jigsaw and Mike Quackenbush. On April 15, Toyota, Jigsaw and Quackenbush defeated Amazing Red, Joel Maximo and Wil Maximo in their first round match in the 2011 King of Trios. The following day, Toyota, Jigsaw and Quackenbush were eliminated from the tournament by Team Michinoku Pro (Dick Togo, Great Sasuke and Jinsei Shinzaki). On April 17, the final day of the tournament, Toyota defeated Madison Eagles in a singles match. Toyota returned to Chikara on December 2, 2011, to take part in the special JoshiMania weekend, defeating Toshie Uematsu on night one. She was also presented with the Diva Dirt Legacy Award, honoring her career. The following day, Toyota teamed with Mike Quackenbush, Fire Ant and Soldier Ant to defeat Chuck Taylor, Icarus, Johnny Gargano and Portia Perez in an eight-person tag team match. On the third and final night of the tour, Toyota, Hanako Nakamori and Sawako Shimono were defeated by Aja Kong, Mio Shirai and Tsubasa Kuragaki in a six-woman tag team match. On September 14, 2012, Toyota made yet another return to Chikara to team with Jigsaw and Mike Quackenbush in the 2012 King of Trios, with the three defeating combatAnt, deviAnt and Soldier Ant in their first round match. The following day, the team was eliminated from the tournament, after losing to Team Sendai Girls (Dash Chisako, Meiko Satomura and Sendai Sachiko). On the third and final day of the tournament, Toyota teamed with Kaori Yoneyama in a tag team match, where they were defeated by Command Bolshoi and Tsubasa Kuragaki. Back in Japan, Toyota produced her 25th anniversary event on September 22, during which she wrestled in all five matches.

== Championships and accomplishments ==
- All Japan Women's Pro-Wrestling
  - AJW Championship (1 time)
  - All Pacific Championship (2 times)
  - IWA World Women's Championship (1 time)
  - WWWA World Single Championship (4 times)
  - WWWA World Tag Team Championship (3 times) – with Mima Shimoda (1) and Toshiyo Yamada (2)
  - Japan Grand Prix (1990, 1995, 1998, 1999)
  - Tag League the Best (1993) – with Akira Hokuto
  - Tag League the Best (1994) – with Takako Inoue
  - Tag League the Best (1996) – with Rie Tamada
  - Tag League the Best (1999) – with Miho Wakizawa
  - Tag League the Best (2001) – with Yumiko Hotta
- Gaea Japan
  - AAAW Single Championship (1 time)
  - AAAW Tag Team Championship (1 time) – with Carlos Amano
- Ice Ribbon
  - Triangle Ribbon Championship (1 time)
  - Ice Ribbon Year-End Award (1 time)
    - Enemy Award (2017) tied with Maika Ozaki
- JWP Joshi Puroresu
  - JWP Openweight Championship (1 time)
  - JWP Tag Team Championship (1 time) – with Kaoru Ito
- Oz Academy
  - Oz Academy Openweight Championship (1 time)
  - Oz Academy Tag Team Championship (2 times) – with Carlos Amano
- Pro Wrestling Illustrated
  - Stanley Weston Award (2022)
- Universal Wrestling Association
  - UWA World Women's Tag Team Championship (1 time) – with Toshiyo Yamada
- World Woman Pro-Wrestling Diana
  - WWWD World Championship (1 time)
- Wrestling Observer Newsletter
  - Match of the Year (1993) with Toshiyo Yamada vs. Dynamite Kansai and Mayumi Ozaki on April 11
  - Match of the Year (1995) vs. Kyoko Inoue on May 7, Tokyo, Japan
  - Most Outstanding Wrestler (1995)
  - Readers' Favorite Wrestler (1995)
  - Wrestling Observer Newsletter Hall of Fame (Class of 2002)

== Luchas de Apuestas record ==
| Winner (wager) | Loser (wager) | Location | Event | Date | Notes |
|---|---|---|---|---|---|
| Manami Toyota (hair) | Toshiyo Yamada (hair) | Korakuen Hall - Tokyo, Japan | AJW Mid Summer Typhoon | August 15, 1992 | |
