= Cutie Suzuki no Ringside Angel =

1990 video game

- Cover art
- Developer: Copya System
- Publisher: Asmik
- Composer: Akihiko Mori
- Platform: Mega Drive
- Release: JP: December 12, 1990
- Genre: Sports
- Modes: Single-player, multiplayer

Cutie Suzuki no Ringside Angel (キューティー鈴木のリングサイドエンジェル; "Cutie Suzuki's Ringside Angel") is a 1990 Japan-exclusive Sega Mega Drive video game about female professional wrestling. It features the famous female Japanese wrestler Cutie Suzuki.

As the first video game based on women's professional wrestling for the Sega Mega Drive, it played a pivotal role in establishing women as protagonists in 16-bit video games, predating Alisia Dragoon by two years.

== Plot ==
Girls in Japan dream of fighting in a wrestling federation. All their training has helped them become professional wrestlers. Nine girls fight for the five major titles of women's professional wrestling.

== Gameplay ==
Punching is allowed in addition to traditional wrestling moves like the piledriver and the suplex. There is even a spectator mode that allows players to preview each fighter's moves.

Damage is displayed for each fighter by the facial expressions of the character. Players can continue to lose matches without the threat of a game over screen. Each wrestler recovers stamina at a different rate. They also have different ways of expressing physical pain and they have different types of screams when they are in anguish.
