= World War 3 (1995) =

1995 World Championship Wrestling pay-per-view event

- Promotional poster featuring Sting
- Promotion: World Championship Wrestling
- Date: November 26, 1995
- City: Norfolk, Virginia
- Venue: Norfolk Scope
- Attendance: 12,000
- Buy rate: 90,000
- Tagline: Sixty Men... Three Rings... Three Giants... One Battle Royal

Pay-per-view chronology
| ← Previous; Halloween Havoc | Next → Starrcade |

World War 3 chronology
| ← Previous; First | Next → 1996 |

The 1995 World War 3 was the inaugural World War 3 professional wrestling pay-per-view (PPV) event produced by World Championship Wrestling (WCW). The event took place on November 26, 1995, from the Norfolk Scope in Norfolk, Virginia.

Seven matches were contested at the event. The main event was the first-ever 60-Man World War 3 battle royal for the vacant WCW World Heavyweight Championship after the previous champion The Giant was stripped of the title due to his controversial title win over Hulk Hogan at Halloween Havoc. Randy Savage was declared the winner of the World War 3 after The Giant pulled Hogan under the rope and the referee didn't see it and when the referee saw Hogan outside, he declared Savage the winner. Other featured matches on the card were Sting versus Ric Flair, Lex Luger versus Randy Savage, a Japanese female wrestling tag team showcase between Bull Nakano and Akira Hokuto from All Japan Women's Pro Wrestling and Mayumi Ozaki and Cutie Suzuki from JWP Joshi Puroresu and a WCW World Television Championship match between Johnny B. Badd and Diamond Dallas Page, with the stipulation that if Badd won, he would gain the managerial services of Kimberly Page.

== Storylines ==
At Halloween Havoc, The Giant controversially defeated Hulk Hogan via disqualification to win the WCW World Heavyweight Championship after Hogan's manager Jimmy Hart turned on him by attacking the referee and then attacked Hogan. Giant was awarded the title in a shocking moment as the title did not change hands on a disqualification and therefore Hart joined The Dungeon of Doom as their manager, a group of which Giant was a member. On the November 6 episode of Monday Nitro, Giant successfully defended the title against Cobra and then Hart revealed that he had signed a contract on Hogan's behalf for Hogan's title match against Giant at Halloween Havoc and revealed a stipulation on the contract that if Hogan would be disqualified then Giant would win the title. However, WCW officials stripped Giant of the title because the disqualification was due to Hart's interference and announced that the title would be decided in the first-ever World War 3 battle royal, which would consist of sixty competitors and would be contested in three rings and would take place at the namesake pay-per-view on November 26.

At Halloween Havoc, Ric Flair turned on his partner Sting during a tag team match against Arn Anderson and Brian Pillman. This led to a reformation of The Four Horsemen with Flair, Anderson, Pillman and a fourth partner in future. Sting defeated Flair on the November 13 episode of Monday Nitro, which led to a rematch between the two at World War 3.

At Halloween Havoc, Randy Savage defeated Lex Luger after Luger collided with Jimmy Hart on the apron. Later that night, Luger turned on Savage and Hulk Hogan after Hart turned on Hogan and cost him the World Heavyweight Championship against The Giant. Luger would then join Dungeon of Doom and resume his rivalry with Savage. On the November 13 episode of Monday Nitro, Luger attacked Savage after Savage defeated Meng, thus leading to a rematch between Savage and Luger at World War 3.

On the November 13 episode of Monday Nitro, Chris Benoit defeated Kensuke Sasaki in a match. Sasaki later won the United States Heavyweight Championship from Sting at a WCW World in Japan event hosted by New Japan Pro-Wrestling, setting up a match between Sasaki and Benoit for the title at World War 3.

At Halloween Havoc, Johnny B. Badd defeated Diamond Dallas Page to win the World Television Championship. This set up a rematch between Badd and DDP for the title at World War 3, with the stipulation that if DDP lost then Badd would win Diamond Doll's managerial services.

On the September 16 episode of Saturday Night, Jim Duggan cost Big Bubba Rogers a match against Dave Sullivan by putting Ralph the Rabbit in the ring, which led to Rogers leaving the match due to his allergies from rabbits. This led to a match between the two on the September 30 episode of Saturday Night, in which Rogers defeated Duggan by hitting him with a taped fist while Duggan was distracted by VK Wallstreet. However, Duggan defeated Rogers in a rematch on the following week's Saturday Night. On the November 11 episode of Saturday Night, it was announced that Duggan would face Rogers in a Taped Fist match and Duggan was depicted as having visited Ireland to check out his ancestors in preparation for his match. On the November 20 episode of Monday Nitro, Duggan cost Rogers his match against Road Warrior Hawk by tripping Rogers from outside the ring as Rogers was about to use the taped fist on Hawk but landed face-first on the taped fist.

== Event ==
=== Preliminary matches ===
Other on-screen personnel
| Role: | Name: |
|---|---|
| Commentators | Tony Schiavone |
| Commentators | Bobby Heenan |
| Commentators | Mike Tenay (Tag team match) |
| Commentators | Dusty Rhodes (Main event; Ring 2) |
| Commentators | Eric Bischoff (Main event; Ring 2) |
| Commentators | Chris Cruise (Main event; Ring 3) |
| Commentators | Larry Zbyszko (Main event; Ring 3) |
| Interviewer | Gene Okerlund |
| Ring announcers | David Penzer |
| Ring announcers | Michael Buffer (Main event) |
| Referees | Randy Anderson |
| Referees | Nick Patrick |

In the inaugural match, Johnny B. Badd defended the World Television Championship against Diamond Dallas Page, with the stipulation being that if Badd won, he would win the managerial services of Page's valet Diamond Doll. Near the climax of the match, Badd executed a springboard and splash outside the ring on DDP and then tossed him into the ring to perform a springboard diving leg drop to win the match and retain the title. As a result, Badd won Diamond Doll's services but freed her.

Next, Jim Duggan took on Big Bubba Rogers in a taped fist match. Duggan was about to win the match as he was about to deliver a three-point stance clothesline to Rogers but VK Wallstreet interfered and Duggan hit him with a 2x4 but Wallstreet had tossed a chain into the ring and Rogers wrapped the chain with his fist and hit Duggan with the chain to knock him out, thus winning the match.

The following match was an interpromotional women's tag team match pitting Mayumi Ozaki and Cutie Suzuki from JWP Joshi Puroresu against Bull Nakano and Akira Hokuto from All Japan Women's Pro Wrestling. After a back and forth action, Nakano hit a Bull's Poseidon on Ozaki for the win.

Next, Kensuke Sasaki defended the United States Heavyweight Championship against Chris Benoit. After a back and forth match, Sasaki executed a Northern Lights Bomb on Benoit to retain the title.

Later, Randy Savage took on Lex Luger. Luger's manager Jimmy Hart distracted the referee as Savage was about to hit a diving elbow drop and Savage tossed Luger out of the ring where the two brawled until Luger applied a Torture Rack on Savage and then tossed him inside the ring to apply an armbar on Savage's injured arm, thus knocking him out. Luger continued to apply the hold on Savage until Sting made the save and talked Luger into releasing the hold.

In the final match on the undercard, Sting took on Ric Flair. In the end of the match, Sting hit a superplex on Flair and applied a Scorpion Deathlock on Flair to make him submit for the win.

=== Main event match ===
The inaugural World War 3 battle royal for the vacant WCW World Heavyweight Championship was the main event. Randy Savage and Hulk Hogan had been working on eliminating One Man Gang but Hogan decided to assist Sting and Lex Luger in eliminating The Giant from the match. In the process, Hogan eliminated all three men from the match, leaving himself, Savage and Gang as the final three entrants. While referee Randy Anderson was busy watching Savage as he eliminated Gang, The Giant pulled Hogan out of the ring through the bottom rope. Hogan went to attack Giant, but since Anderson saw Hogan on the floor he called for the bell and declared Savage the winner of the match and the new world champion despite Hogan's protests.

== Reception ==
World War 3 received mixed reviews from critics. Jack Bramma of 411Mania gave the event a rating of 5.0, writing "Mero/DDP bring the goods but every thing else can be skipped. Even the good stuff of the Japanese women's match and Flair/Sting have much better iterations elsewhere."

Scott Keith of 411Mania wrote "Aside from the god-awful main event abortion of a battle royale, this is a pretty decent show that started a good run for WCW. Of course, all the good workers that caused it got buried during the nWo era, but that’s WCW for ya."

Wrestling 20 Years Ago staff rated the event 6.5 out of 10, writing "The main event is a real drag, it lasts the better part of an hour. But the action before that should have something in it to impress everybody. I'm more picky than most when it comes to lack of selling, but I get the feeling the two Japanese matches will be enjoyed more by many. Good show, stinker of a main event."

== Aftermath ==
The following night on Monday Nitro, Hulk Hogan interrupted an interview of the new World Heavyweight Champion Randy Savage and demanded that the outcome of the World War 3 be reviewed as he was not eliminated from the match but The Giant interrupted by attacking both men. On the December 18 episode of Monday Nitro, Hogan attacked Giant and several referees during Giant's title shot against Savage for the title, which resulted in Hogan being suspended for the rest of 1995 on the December 25 episode of Nitro. Savage would hold the title until Starrcade, where WCW competed against New Japan Pro-Wrestling wrestlers in an interpromotional World Cup. WCW won the tournament 4–3 and then Sting, Ric Flair and Lex Luger competed in a triangle match to earn an immediate title match against Savage. Flair won the match, thus earning an immediate title shot against Savage, which Flair won.

Hulk Hogan and The Giant's feud continued until SuperBrawl VI, where Hogan defeated Giant in a steel cage match to conclude the rivalry.

Mayumi Ozaki and Cutie Suzuki faced Akira Hokuto and Bull Nakano in a rematch on the following night's episode of Monday Nitro, which Hokuto and Nakano won again.

Johnny B. Badd and Diamond Dallas Page had a rematch for the World Television Championship on the following night's Monday Nitro, where Badd won after Diamond Doll knocked DDP out with a chain. Badd gave Doll, the option to stay free or remain with him and she chose to be his valet. This led to a match between Badd and DDP for the title at SuperBrawl VI, where Badd retained.

== Results ==
| No. | Results | Stipulations | Times |
|---|---|---|---|
| 1 | Johnny B. Badd (c) defeated Diamond Dallas Page (with The Diamond Doll) | Singles match for the WCW World Television Championship | 12:35 |
| 2 | Big Bubba Rogers defeated Jim Duggan | Taped fist match | 10:08 |
| 3 | Bull Nakano and Akira Hokuto (with Sonny Onoo) defeated Mayumi Ozaki and Cutie Suzuki | Tag team match | 9:16 |
| 4 | Kensuke Sasaki (c) (with Sonny Onoo) defeated Chris Benoit | Singles match for the WCW United States Heavyweight Championship | 10:00 |
| 5 | Lex Luger defeated Randy Savage by submission | Singles match | 5:28 |
| 6 | Sting defeated Ric Flair by submission | Singles match | 14:30 |
| 7 | Randy Savage won by "last eliminating" Hulk Hogan | 60-man World War match for the vacant WCW World Heavyweight Championship^{1} | 30:40 |
(c) / – the champion(s) heading into the match

^1Other competitors were Scott Armstrong, Steve Armstrong, Arn Anderson, Johnny B. Badd, Marcus Bagwell, Chris Benoit, Big Train Bart, Bunkhouse Buck, Cobra, Disco Inferno, Jim Duggan, Bobby Eaton, Ric Flair, The Giant, Eddie Guerrero, Hulk Hogan, Mr. JL, Chris Kanyon, Brian Knobbs, Kurasawa, Lex Luger, Joey Maggs, Meng, Hugh Morrus, Max Muscle, Scott Norton, One Man Gang, Paul Orndorff, Diamond Dallas Page, Sgt. Buddy Lee Parker, Brian Pillman, Sgt. Craig Pittman, Lord Steven Regal, Scotty Riggs, Road Warrior Hawk, Big Bubba Rogers, Jerry Sags, Ricky Santana, Kensuke Sasaki, Shark, Fidel Sierra, Dick Slater, Mark Starr, Stevie Ray, Sting, Dave Sullivan, The Taskmaster, Super Assassin #1, Super Assassin #2, Booker T, Squire David Taylor, Bobby Walker, VK Wallstreet, Pez Whatley, Mike Winner, Alex Wright, James Earl Wright, The Yeti and The Zodiac

2Hulk Hogan was pulled under the bottom rope by The Giant, but since the referee didn't see it, Hogan was declared eliminated and the victory was awarded to Savage.
