= Battle Girl: The Living Dead in Tokyo Bay =

- Batoru gâru
- Directed by: Kazuo Komizu
- Written by: Daisuke Serizawa
- Produced by: Kazuo Komizu
- Starring: Cutie Suzuki
- Release date: 1991
- Country: Japan
- Language: Japanese

Battle Girl: The Living Dead in Tokyo Bay (バトルガール Tokyo Crisis Wars) is a 1991 Japanese horror film directed by Kazuo Komizu. It stars Cutie Suzuki as a survivor of a zombie apocalypse in Tokyo.

== Plot ==
After a meteor lands, the population of Tokyo transforms into flesh-eating zombies, and the military quarantines the city. A survivor, Keiko, fights her way through the city and attempts to defeat General Hugioka's evil mercenaries, who indiscriminately kill both humans and zombies.

== Cast ==
- Cutie Suzuki as Keiko
- Kera
- Heiko Hayase
- Kenji Ohtsuki

== Release ==
Synapse Films released Battle Girl on DVD on February 23, 2010.

== Reception ==
Bill Gibron of DVD Talk rated it 2/5 stars and called it a boring attempt to imitate Troma Entertainment. David Johnson of DVD Verdict wrote, "I don't know how you screw up a movie about a zombie-killing girl played by a professional wrestler, but the folks behind Battle Girl perfected the formula. Simply put, this is one of the most boring, nonsensical, bloodsucker excursions I've seen." Writing in The Zombie Movie Encyclopedia, academic Peter Dendle said that the "low-budget effects and goofy costumes are devastating for a science fiction apocalypse feature such as this one".
