= JWP Tag Team Championship =

Professional wrestling women's tag team championship

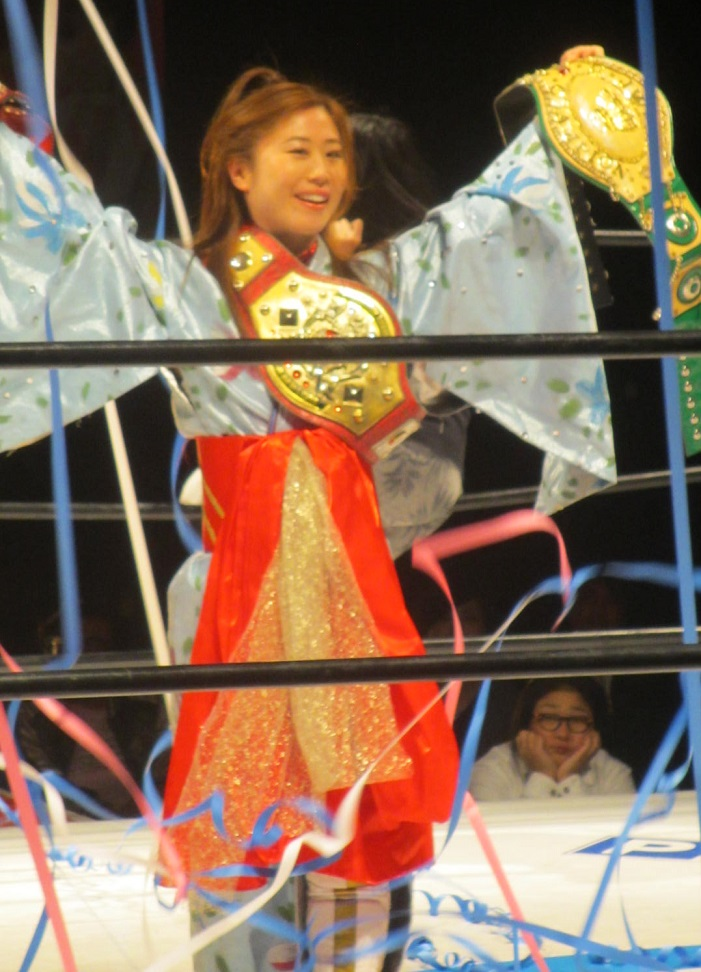
- Tsukasa Fujimoto holding one of the title belts in her left hand

Details
- Promotion: JWP Joshi Puroresu
- Date established: August 9, 1992
- Date retired: April 2, 2017
Statistics
- First champions: Cutie Suzuki and Mayumi Ozaki
- Final champions: Command Bolshoi and Leon
- Most reigns: As a team (4 reigns): Uematsu☆Ran (Ran Yu-Yu and Toshie Uematsu); As an individual (7 reigns): Command Bolshoi; Ran Yu-Yu
- Longest reign: Kaori Yoneyama and Toujyuki Leon (448 days)
- Shortest reign: Azumi Hyuga and Command Bolshoi (<1 day)
- Oldest champion: Yumiko Hotta (42 years, 15 days) (Note: The date of birth of Command Bolshoi is unknown, therefore, this stat might be inaccurate.)
- Youngest champion: Arisa Nakajima (23 years, 135 days)

The JWP Tag Team Championship was a professional wrestling tag team championship owned by the JWP Joshi Puroresu promotion. The championship was introduced on August 9, 1992, when Cutie Suzuki and Mayumi Ozaki defeated Dynamite Kansai and Sumiko Saito in a tournament final to become the inaugural champions. On August 3, 2008, the title was unified with the Daily Sports Women's Tag Team Championship. Together, the two titles were sometimes referred to as the "JWP Double Crown Tag Team Championship". When JWP Joshi Puroresu went out of business in April 2017, the two titles were separated again with the JWP title remaining with the JWP production company, while the Daily Sports title moved on to Command Bolshoi's new follow-up promotion.

Like most professional wrestling championships, the title was won as a result of a scripted match. There were forty-nine reigns shared among thirty-nine different wrestlers and thirty-seven teams. The title was retired on April 2, 2017, when JWP Joshi Puroresu went out of business. That same day, Command Bolshoi and Leon won the final match contested for the title by making their second successful defense against Kazuki and Rydeen Hagane.

== Title history ==
On August 9, 1992, Cutie Suzuki and Mayumi Ozaki became the inaugural champions, after defeating Dynamite Kansai and Sumiko Saito in a tournament final. Since then, there have been 16 reigns in a row before the championship was vacated on June 18, 2000, after the previous champions Azumi Hyuga and Command Bolshoi won the title in controversial fashion. On March 31, 2001, Misae Genki and Ran Yu-Yu won the vacant title by defeating Bolshoi and Hyuga. On August 12, 2008, the team of Harukura (Kayoko Haruyama and Tsubasa Kuragaki) became the inaugural Daily Sports Women's Tag Team Championship, which would be defended together with the JWP Tag Team Championship moving forward.

On April 2, 2017, at JWP's 25th Anniversary show, which was JWP's last show as JWP closed doors, the championship was deactivated with Bolshoi and Leon being the last champions, ith a final successful title defense against Kazuki and Rydeen Hagane. On August 11, Pure-J was founded under Bolshoi's authority, which retained control over the Daily Sports Women's Tag Team and Princess of Pro-Wrestling Championships.

== Reigns ==
Over the championship's 24-year history, there have been 49 reigns between 37 teams composed of 39 individual champions and eight vacancies. The inaugural champions were Cutie Suzuki and Mayumi Ozaki, while Command Bolshoi and Leon being the last ones. As a team, Uematsu☆Ran (Ran Yu-Yu and Toshie Uematsu) hold the record for most reigns at four, while individually, Bolshoi and Yu-Yu shares the record for most reigns at seven. YoneLeo (Kaori Yoneyama and Toujyuki Leon)'s reign is the longest at 448 days, while Azumi Hyuga and Bolshoi's is the shortest which lasted less than a day. Yumiko Hotta is the oldest champion at 42 years old, while Arisa Nakajima is the youngest at 23 years old.

Key
No.	Overall reign number
Reign	Reign number for the specific team—reign numbers for the individuals are in parentheses, if different
Days	Number of days held
Defenses	Number of successful defenses
<1	Reign lasted less than a day

No.	Champion	Championship change			Reign statistics			Notes	Ref.
No.	Champion	Date	Event	Location	Reign	Days	Defenses	Notes	Ref.
1	Cutie Suzuki and Mayumi Ozaki	August 9, 1992	JWP House Show	Tokyo, Japan	1	224	2	Defeated Dynamite Kansai and Sumiko Saito in a tournament final to become the inaugural champions.	
2	Devil Masami and Dynamite Kansai	March 21, 1993	JWP House Show	Tokyo, Japan	1	256	0		
3	Cutie Suzuki and Mayumi Ozaki	December 2, 1993	JWP House Show	Kawasaki, Kanagawa, Japan	2	115	1		
4	Las Cachorras Orientales (Etsuko Mita and Mima Shimoda)	March 27, 1994	JWP House Show	Yokohama, Japan	1	287	3		
5	Hikari Fukuoka and Mayumi Ozaki	January 8, 1995	JWP House Show	Tokyo, Japan	1 (1, 3)	69	0		
6	Cutie Suzuki and Dynamite Kansai	March 18, 1995	JWP House Show	Osaka, Japan	1 (3, 2)	266	1		
7	Hikari Fukuoka and Kaoru	December 9, 1995	JWP House Show	Yokohama, Japan	1 (2, 1)	211	1		
8	Cutie Suzuki and Dynamite Kansai	July 7, 1996	JWP House Show	Tokyo, Japan	2 (4, 3)	142	0		
9	Devil Masami and Hikari Fukuoka	November 26, 1996	JWP House Show	Tokyo, Japan	1 (2, 3)	423	4		
10	Kaoru Ito and Manami Toyota	January 23, 1998	JWP House Show	Kawasaki, Kanagawa, Japan	1	19	0		
11	Hikari Fukuoka and Tomoko Kuzumi	February 11, 1998	JWP House Show	Tokyo, Japan	1 (4, 1)	123	0		
12	Cutie Suzuki and Devil Masami	June 14, 1998	JWP House Show	Tokyo, Japan	1 (5, 3)	47	0		
13	Hikari Fukuoka and Tomoko Kuzumi	July 31, 1998	JWP House Show	Kawasaki, Kanagawa, Japan	2 (5, 2)	168	1		
14	Command Bolshoi and Rieko Amano/Carlos Amano	January 15, 1999	JWP House Show	Osaka, Japan	1	391	2	Amano changed her ring name to Carlos Amano on February 24, 1999.	
15	Zap (Zap I and Zap T)	February 10, 2000	JWP House Show	Tokyo, Japan	1 (2, 1)	129	0	Zap I formerly known as Kaoru Ito.	
16	Azumi Hyuga and Command Bolshoi	June 18, 2000	JWP House Show	Tokyo, Japan	1 (3, 2)	<1	0	Azumi Hyuga formerly known as Tomoko Kuzumi.	
—	Vacated	June 18, 2000	—	—	—	—	—	Title vacated due to Hyuga and Bolshoi having won it in controversial fashion.	
17	Misae Genki and Ran Yu-Yu	March 31, 2001	JWP House Show	Tokyo, Japan	1	153	2	Defeated Azumi Hyuga and Command Bolshoi in a tournament final to win the vacant championship.	
18	Azumi Hyuga and Kayoko Haruyama	August 31, 2001	JWP House Show	Tokyo, Japan	1 (4, 1)	10	0		
19	Command Bolshoi and Gami	September 10, 2001	JWP House Show	Tokyo, Japan	1 (3, 1)	313	2		
20	Azumi Hyuga and Ran Yu-Yu	July 20, 2002	JWP House Show	Tokyo, Japan	1 (5, 2)	106	3		
—	Vacated	November 3, 2002	—	—	—	—	—	Title vacated when Yu-Yu left JWP.	
21	Kaori Yoneyama and Kayoko Haruyama	January 25, 2004	JWP House Show	Tokyo, Japan	1 (1, 2)	322	2	Defeated Etsuko Mita and Misae Genki in a tournament final to win the vacant championship.	
22	Akino and Tsubasa Kuragaki	December 12, 2004	JWP House Show	Tokyo, Japan	1	154	1		
23	YoneLeo (Kaori Yoneyama and Toujyuki Leon)	May 15, 2005	JWP House Show	Tokyo, Japan	1 (2, 1)	448	3		
24	Uematsu☆Ran (Ran Yu-Yu and Toshie Uematsu)	August 6, 2006	Take Aim	Tokyo, Japan	1 (3, 1)	140	2		
25	The☆Wanted!? (Kazuki and Sachie Abe)	December 24, 2006	JWP House Show	Tokyo, Japan	1	168	1		
—	Vacated	June 10, 2007	Kazuki 10th Anniversary	Tokyo, Japan	—	—	—	Title vacated for the LSD45 gauntlet match.	
26	The☆Wanted!? (Kazuki and Sachie Abe)	June 10, 2007	Kazuki 10th Anniversary	Tokyo, Japan	2	28	0	Defeated Ran Yu-Yu and Toshie Uematsu to win the LSD45 gauntlet match.	
27	Uematsu☆Ran (Ran Yu-Yu and Toshie Uematsu)	July 8, 2007	Power Up!!	Tokyo, Japan	2 (4, 2)	35	0		
28	Harukura (Kayoko Haruyama and Tsubasa Kuragaki)	August 12, 2007	Power Up!!	Tokyo, Japan	1 (3, 2)	427	3	On August 3, 2008, Haruyama and Kuragaki defeated Manami Toyota and Yumiko Hotta in a tournament final to become the inaugural Daily Sports Women's Tag Team Champions. From this point onwards, the two titles are defended together.	
29	Uematsu☆Ran (Ran Yu-Yu and Toshie Uematsu)	October 12, 2008	Survival Road 1	Tokyo, Japan	3 (5, 3)	105	1		
30	Keito and Yumiko Hotta	January 25, 2009	JWP House Show	Osaka, Japan	1	77	1		
31	Command Bolshoi and Megumi Yabushita	April 12, 2009	JWP–Maniax 2009	Tokyo, Japan	1 (4, 1)	98	0		
32	YoneSakura (Emi Sakura and Kaori Yoneyama)	July 19, 2009	Pure–Slam 2009	Tokyo, Japan	1 (1, 3)	147	1		
33	Azumi Hyuga and Ran Yu-Yu	December 13, 2009	JWP–Climax 2009: 2nd	Kawasaki, Kanagawa, Japan	2 (6, 6)	14	0	This match was also contested for the International Ribbon Tag Team Championship.	
—	Vacated	December 27, 2009	JWP–Climax 2009: Azumi Hyuga Final	Tokyo, Japan	—	—	—	The title was vacated, after Hyuga retired from professional wrestling.	
34	Kazuki and Toshie Uematsu	March 22, 2010	Road to Maniax 2010	Osaka, Japan	1 (3, 4)	181	5	Defeated Command Bolshoi and Megumi Yabushita in a tournament final to win the vacant championship.	
35	Aja Kong and Sachie Abe	September 19, 2010	JWP Revolution 2010	Tokyo, Japan	1 (1, 3)	95	1		
36	Harukura (Kayoko Haruyama and Tsubasa Kuragaki)	December 23, 2010	JWP–Climax 2010	Tokyo, Japan	2 (4, 3)	325	2		
37	Queens Revolution (Hailey Hatred and Kaori Yoneyama)	November 13, 2011	Road to JWP 20th 16	Tokyo, Japan	1 (1, 4)	57	0		
—	Vacated	January 9, 2012	—	—	—	—	—	Hatred and Yoneyama were stripped of the title as punishment for Yoneyama canceling her announced plan to retire at the end of 2011.	
38	Uematsu☆Ran (Ran Yu-Yu and Toshie Uematsu)	April 8, 2012	JWP Tag League the Best 2012 Finals	Tokyo, Japan	4 (7, 5)	14	1	Defeated Hanako Nakamori and Misaki Ohata in the finals of the 2012 Tag League the Best to win the vacant championship.	
—	Vacated	April 22, 2012	JWP 20th Anniversary: Maniax 2012	Tokyo, Japan	—	—	—	Title vacated after Uematsu wrestled her final JWP match before her retirement.	
39	Tai-Pan Sisters/Reset (Emi Sakura and Kaori Yoneyama)	May 4, 2012	JWP House Show	Tokyo, Japan	2 (2, 5)	107	2	Defeated Command Bolshoi and Rabbit Miu to win the vacant championship.	
40	Arisa Nakajima and Command Bolshoi	August 19, 2012	Pure–Slam 2012	Tokyo, Japan	1 (1, 5)	140	2		
41	Harukura (Kayoko Haruyama and Tsubasa Kuragaki)	January 6, 2013	JWP 2013 Opener!!	Tokyo, Japan	3 (5, 4)	224	2		
42	Heart Move (Hanako Nakamori and Morii)	August 18, 2013	JWP–Pure Slam 2013	Tokyo, Japan	1	70	0		
—	Vacated	October 27, 2013	—	—	—	—	—	Title vacated due to Morii being sidelined with an injured right arm ever since the title win.	
43	Jumonji Sisters (Dash Chisako and Sendai Sachiko)	December 15, 2013	JWP–Climax 2013	Tokyo, Japan	1	117	0	Defeated Leon and Ray in the finals of a four-team tournament to win the vacant championship.	
—	Vacated	April 11, 2014	Road to Kourakuen	Tokyo, Japan	—	—	—	Title vacated due to Sachiko being sidelined with a knee injury.	
44	Wild Snufkin (Command Bolshoi and Kyoko Kimura)	May 4, 2014	GW Itabashi 3Days Matsuri 2	Tokyo, Japan	1 (6, 1)	238	3	Defeated Rabbit Miu and Tsukushi in a decision match to win the vacant championship.	
45	Voladoras L×R (Leon and Ray)	December 28, 2014	JWP–Climax 2014	Tokyo, Japan	1 (2, 1)	210	4		
46	Jumonji Sisters (Dash Chisako and Sendai Sachiko)	July 26, 2015	Command☆Hurricane in Nagoya	Nagoya, Japan	2	154	1		
47	Best Friends (Arisa Nakajima and Tsukasa Fujimoto)	December 27, 2015	JWP–Climax 2015	Tokyo, Japan	1 (2, 1)	231	3		
48	Zenryoku Batankyu (Hanako Nakamori and Kyoko Kimura)	August 14, 2016	Pure–Plum 2016	Tokyo, Japan	1 (2, 2)	148	2		
49	Command Bolshoi and Leon	January 9, 2017	2017-nen Kaimaku Sen!!	Kawasaki, Kanagawa, Japan	1 (7, 3)	83	2		
—	Deactivated	April 2, 2017	JWP 25th Anniversary	Tokyo, Japan	—	—	—	The championship was retired when JWP Joshi Puroresu goes out of business.	

== Combined reigns ==
<1	Indicates that the reign lasted less than one day

=== By team ===
Rank	Team	No. of reigns	Combined defenses	Combined days
1	Harukura (Kayoko Haruyama and Tsubasa Kuragaki)	3	7	976
2	YoneLeo (Kaori Yoneyama and Toujyuki Leon)	1	3	448
3	Devil Masami and Hikari Fukuoka	1	4	423
4	Cutie Suzuki and Dynamite Kansai	2	0	408
5	Command Bolshoi and Rieko Amano/Carlos Amano	1	2	391
6	Cutie Suzuki and Mayumi Ozaki	2	1	339
7	Kaori Yoneyama and Kayoko Haruyama	1	2	322
8	Command Bolshoi and Gami	1	2	313
9	Uematsu☆Ran (Ran Yu-Yu and Toshie Uematsu)	4	4	294
10	Hikari Fukuoka and Tomoko Kuzumi	2	1	291
11	Las Cachorras Orientales (Etsuko Mita and Mima Shimoda)	1	3	287
12	Jumonji Sisters (Dash Chisako and Sendai Sachiko)	2	1	271
13	Devil Masami and Dynamite Kansai	1	0	256
14	YoneSakura/Tai-Pan Sisters/Reset (Emi Sakura and Kaori Yoneyama)	2	3	254
15	Wild Snufkin (Command Bolshoi and Kyoko Kimura)	1	3	238
16	Best Friends (Arisa Nakajima and Tsukasa Fujimoto)	1	3	231
17	Hikari Fukuoka and Kaoru	1	1	211
18	Voladoras L×R (Leon and Ray)	1	4	210
19	The☆Wanted!? (Kazuki and Sachie Abe)	2	1	196
20	Kazuki and Toshie Uematsu	1	5	181
21	Akino and Tsubasa Kuragaki	1	1	154
22	Misae Genki and Ran Yu-Yu	1	2	153
23	Zenryoku Batankyu (Hanako Nakamori and Kyoko Kimura)	1	2	148
24	Arisa Nakajima and Command Bolshoi	1	2	140
25	Zap (Zap I and Zap T)	1	0	129
26	Azumi Hyuga and Ran Yu-Yu	2	3	120
27	Command Bolshoi and Megumi Yabushita	1	0	98
28	Aja Kong and Sachie Abe	1	1	95
29	Command Bolshoi and Leon	1	2	83
30	Keito and Yumiko Hotta	1	1	77
31	Heart Move (Hanako Nakamori and Morii)	1	0	70
32	Hikari Fukuoka and Mayumi Ozaki	1	0	69
33	Queens Revolution (Hailey Hatred and Kaori Yoneyama)	1	0	57
34	Cutie Suzuki and Devil Masami	1	0	47
35	Kaoru Ito and Manami Toyota	1	0	19
36	Azumi Hyuga and Kayoko Haruyama	1	0	10
37	Azumi Hyuga and Command Bolshoi	1	0	<1

=== By wrestler ===
Rank	Wrestler	No. of reigns	Combined defenses	Combined days
1	Kayoko Haruyama	5	9	1,308
2	Command Bolshoi	7	11	1,263
3	Tsubasa Kuragaki	4	8	1,130
4	Kaori Yoneyama	5	8	1,081
5	Hikari Fukuoka	5	6	994
6	Cutie Suzuki	5	4	794
7	Toujyuki Leon/Leon	3	8	741
8	Devil Masami	3	4	726
9	Dynamite Kansai	3	1	664
10	Ran Yu-Yu	7	9	567
11	Toshie Uematsu	5	9	475
12	Tomoko Kuzumi/Azumi Hyuga	6	4	421
13	Mayumi Ozaki	3	1	408
14	Rieko Amano/Carlos Amano	1	2	391
15	Kyoko Kimura	2	5	386
16	Kazuki	3	6	377
17	Arisa Nakajima	2	5	371
18	Gami	1	2	313
19	Sachie Abe	3	2	291
20	Etsuko Mita	1	3	287
20	Mima Shimoda	1	3	287
22	Dash Chisako	2	1	271
22	Sendai Sachiko	2	1	271
24	Emi Sakura	2	3	254
25	Tsukasa Fujimoto	1	3	231
26	Hanako Nakamori	2	2	218
27	Kaoru	1	1	211
28	Ray	1	4	210
29	Akino	1	1	154
30	Misae Genki	1	2	153
31	Kaoru Ito/Zap I	2	0	148
32	Zap T	1	0	129
33	Megumi Yabushita	1	0	98
34	Aja Kong	1	1	95
35	Keito	1	1	77
35	Yumiko Hotta	1	1	77
37	Morii	1	0	70
38	Hailey Hatred	1	0	57
39	Manami Toyota	1	0	19

== See also ==
- Daily Sports Women's Tag Team Championship
- Goddesses of Stardom Championship
- International Ribbon Tag Team Championship
- Oz Academy Tag Team Championship
- Wave Tag Team Championship
- Women's World Tag Team Championship
