= Cutie Suzuki =

Japanese professional wrestler (born 1969)

Personal information
- Born: Yumi Suzuki; October 22, 1969 (age 56)

Professional wrestling career
- Ring name(s): Cuty Suzuki; Cutie Suzuki
- Debut: 1986
- Retired: 1999

Yumi Harashima (原嶋 由美, Harashima Yumi) (born October 22, 1969, as Yumi Suzuki (鈴木 由美, Suzuki Yumi)), better known by her ring name Cutie Suzuki (キューティー鈴木, Kyūtī Suzuki), is a retired Japanese professional wrestler, actress, and model who is best known for her time in JWP Joshi Puroresu, where she is a 5-time JWP Tag Team Champion.

In 1990, she was featured in an all female wrestling game based on her titled Cutie Suzuki no Ringside Angel, which was never released outside of Japan but played an important part of establishing women as protagonists in 16-bit video games at the time.

== Professional wrestling career ==
On December 1, 1992, JWP Joshi Puroresu (JWP) introduced the JWP Openweight Championship, when Dynamite Kansai defeated Suzuki in a tournament final to become the inaugural champion.

On April 2, 1993, she wrestled alongside Mayumi Ozaki against Double Inoue at AJW All-Star Dream Slam I, which has been described as one of the greatest women's professional wrestling events in history. At the event, Double Inoue defeated both Suzuki and Mayumi Ozaki after 16 minutes.

In November 1994, Suzuki competed at All Japan Women's Pro-Wrestling event Big Egg Wrestling Universe. At the event, Megumi Kudo and Hikari Fukuoka defeated Suzuki and Takako Inoue.

In 1995 at World Championship Wrestling (WCW)'s World War 3 pay-per-view, Suzuki and Mayumi Ozaki were defeated by Bull Nakano and Akira Hokuto (accompanied by Sonny Onoo) in a tag team match. The teams also competed the following night on Nitro.

== Other media ==
Suzuki, in-part due to her wrestling career, had great success as a gravure model and was featured in numerous gravure calendars and magazines in Japan throughout the 90's.

As an actress, she appeared in the films The Ninja Dragon and Battle Girl: The Living Dead in Tokyo Bay, and she voiced the character Iczer-3 in the animated series Iczer Reborn. The video game Cutie Suzuki no Ringside Angel for Sega Mega Drive stars Suzuki as a playable character.

== Championships and accomplishments ==
- Japan Women's Pro-Wrestling
  - JWP Junior Championship (1 time)
  - UWA Women's Junior Championship (1 time)
- JWP Joshi Puroresu
  - JWP Tag Team Championship (5 times) – with Devil Masami (1), Dynamite Kansai (2) and Mayumi Ozaki (2)
