= Mayumi Ozaki =

Japanese professional wrestler (born 1968)

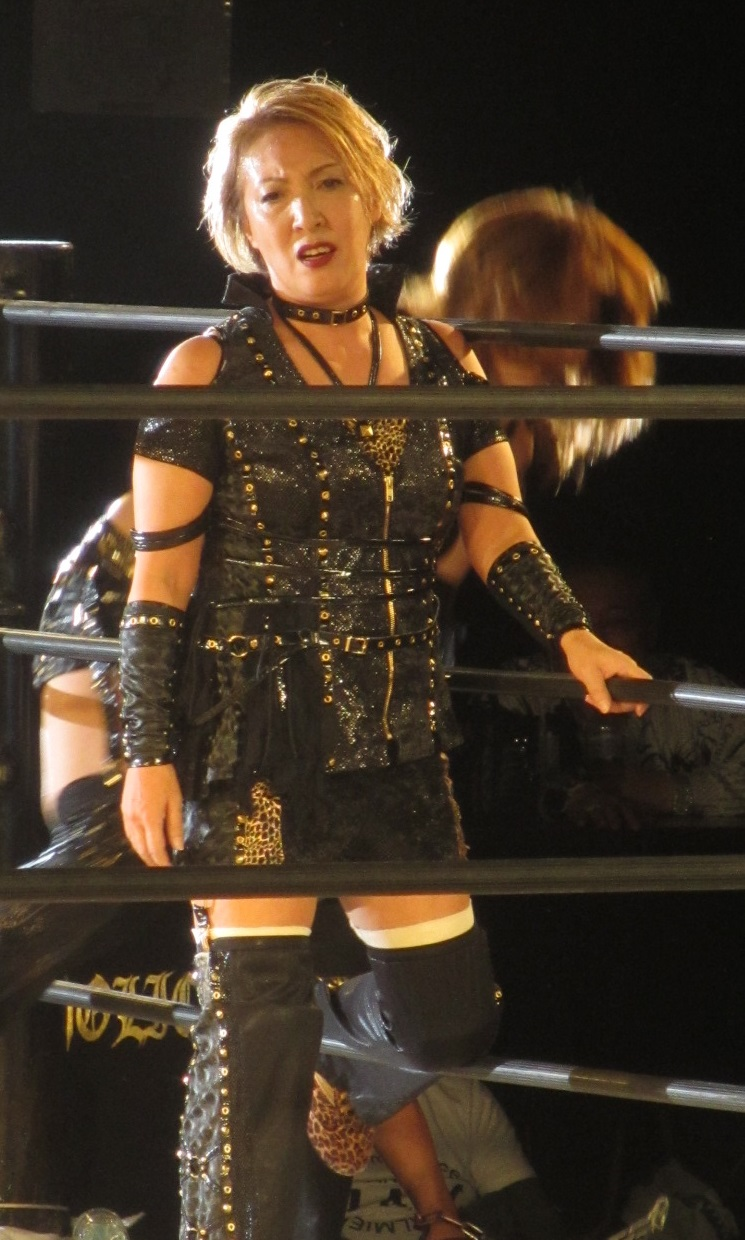
- Ozaki in November 2019

Personal information
- Born: October 28, 1968 (age 57) Kawaguchi, Saitama Prefecture, Japan

Professional wrestling career
- Ring name(s): Mayumi Ozaki; Mayumi Saita; Pure Wild; Queen of the Street Fight
- Billed height: 1.55 m (5 ft 1 in)
- Billed weight: 57 kg (126 lb)
- Trained by: Kotetsu Yamamoto
- Debut: August 17, 1986

Mayumi Ozaki (尾崎 魔弓, Ozaki Mayumi) (born October 28, 1968) is a Japanese professional wrestler. She is currently working for Oz Academy.

== Professional wrestling career ==
Ozaki debuted in a tag team match in August, 1986. In her career, she held the WWWA tag titles with Dynamite Kansai from April 11, 1993 to December 6, 1993 (both winning from and losing to Manami Toyota and Toshiyo Yamada of All Japan Women's Pro-Wrestling, selected for "Wrestling Observer Newsletter's Match of the Year for 1993". They rematched in April 1993 and won at the Dreamslam II (and with it the titles); the first time a woman's match won the award. Their final match was at St. Battle Final in December. (AJW). She also held the UWA Junior and JWP Junior titles between 1988 and 1991, and teamed with Cutie Suzuki and Hikari Fukuoka to win the JWP Tag Titles a number of times between 1992 and 1995. She held the AAAW Tag Team Championship with Aja Kong, beating GAEA's Sugar Sato and Chikayo Nagashima on August 23, 1998 in Tokyo.

In 1995 Ozaki competed at the 1995 World War 3 on pay-per-view event where she teamed with Cutie Suzuki against Bull Nakano and Akira Hokuto where they lost. They also competed against the same team the very next night on WCW Monday Nitro which they also lost.

Until 1997, Ozaki usually wrestled in JWP Joshi Puroresu, but was also the leader of her own heel stable called the Oz Academy, which freelanced in other women's promotions in Japan, such as AJW and GAEA. In 1998 Ozaki became a true free agent, and began to promote her own shows using her Oz Academy wrestlers, looking for a niche in the fragmented women's puroresu scene. Ozaki made her mark mostly in tag team matches as she competed in four bouts that were among the greatest ever in women's tag team wrestling, having earned a 5-star rating each by the Wrestling Observer Newsletter.

In December 2011, Ozaki took part in American promotion Chikara's JoshiMania weekend, teaming with Mio Shirai in a losing effort against the team of Cherry and Ayako Hamada on night one on December 2. The following day, Ozaki defeated Shirai in a singles match. On the third and final night of the tour, Ozaki defeated Kaori Yoneyama in another singles match.

== Championships and accomplishments ==
- All Japan Pro Wrestling
  - AJPW TV Six-Man Tag Team Championship (1 time) – with Suwama and Maya Yukihi
- All Japan Women's Pro-Wrestling
  - WWWA World Tag Team Championship (1 time) – with Dynamite Kansai
- Gaea Japan/Marvelous That's Women Pro Wrestling
  - AAAW Single Championship (2 times) (Note: Ozaki's first reign with the AAAW Single Championship was under the Gaea banner. Her second reign was at Marvelous.)
  - AAAW Tag Team Championship (3 times) – with Aja Kong (1), Akira Hokuto (1), and Kaoru (1)
  - Gaora Cup (2001)
  - Tag Team Tournament (1998) – with Chikayo Nagashima
  - Tag Team Tournament (2001) – with Kaoru
- Guinness World Records

- Oldest (female) pair to win a professional tag team wrestling championship (2023) – with Jaguar Yokota

- Japan Women's Pro Wrestling
  - JWP Junior Championship (3 times)
  - UWA Junior Championship (1 time)
- JWP Joshi Puroresu
  - JWP Openweight Championship (1 time)
  - JWP Tag Team Championship (3 times) – with Cutie Suzuki (2), and Hikari Fukuoka (1)
- Marvelous That's Women Pro Wrestling
  - AAAW Single Championship (2 times, current)
- Oz Academy
  - Oz Academy Openweight Championship (4 times)
  - Oz Academy Tag Team Championship (7 times, current) – with Jaguar Yokota (1, current), Kaoru (2), Maya Yukihi (1), Mio Shirai (1), Sakura Hirota (1) and Yumi Ohka (1)
  - Oz Academy Pioneer 3-Way Championship (1 time)
  - Oz Academy Openweight Title #1 Contendership League (2008)
  - Oz Academy Openweight Title #1 Contendership Tournament (2019)
  - Best Wizard Award (13 times)
    - Best Bout Award (2013) vs. Chikayo Nagashima on September 15
    - Best Bout Award (2017) with Maya Yukihi vs. Akino and Kaho Kobayashi on October 29
    - Best Bout Award (2019) vs. Hiroyo Matsumoto in a barbed wire current blast bat death match on August 25
    - Best Bout Award (2020) vs. Saori Anou on August 28
    - Best Bout Award (2021) vs. Maya Yukihi, Saori Anou and Yumi Ohka on August 18
    - Best Bout Award (2022) vs. Akino on December 30
    - Best Bout Award (2023) with Kakeru and Saori Anou vs. Chigusa Nagayo, Mio Momono and Tomoko Watanabe on October 22
    - Best Bout Award (2024) vs. Maya Yukihi on August 18
    - Best Singles Match Award (2010) vs. Kaoru on August 22
    - Best Singles Match Award (2011) vs. Aja Kong on April 10
    - Happening Award (2019) Ozaki's destroying the Openweight Championship
    - MVP Award (2011, 2019)
- Pro Wrestling Wave
  - Catch the Wave Award
    - Best Performance Award (2016) shared with Atsushi Ishiguro
- Super Fireworks Pro Wrestling

- Blast Queen Championship (1 time)

- Wrestling Observer Newsletter

- Match of the Year (1993) with Dynamite Kansai vs. Manami Toyota and Toshiyo Yamada on April 11

== Publications ==
=== Books ===
- Ozaki, Mayumi (1990). 悪役 (ザ・ヒール) ― 私はハードに生きたいの [A heel - hard and strong] (in Japanese). Jitsugyo no Nihon Sha. ASIN 4408100919.
- Ozaki, Mayumi (2003). 悪玉―憎まれる生き方 [Rogue - life as a baddie] (in Japanese). Jitsugyo no Nihon Sha. ISBN 9784883382903.
- Ozaki, Mayumi (2014). リングから見えた殺意――女子プロレスラー・鬼剣魔矢の推理 [Ringside detective Maya Kitsurugi, a female professional wrestler (mystery)] (in Japanese). Shodensha. ISBN 9784396615024.
- Yanagisawa, Ken (2016). 1993年の女子プロレス [Women's Professional Wrestling, 1993 (includes interview with Mayumi Ozaki)] (in Japanese). Futabasha.

=== Magazines ===
- 堺屋太一 (Sakaiya Taichi); Mayumi Ozaki (2011). "対談 堺屋太一×尾崎魔弓 日本の復興と女子プロレス" [Interview with Mayumi Ozaki - the Great Earthquake and Women's Puroresu]. Daisan Bunmei magazine. Path to lead away from the Great Earthquake of North East Japan (in Japanese). Vol. 621, no. 3. Daisanbunmei-sha INC. pp. 38–41.

=== Manga ===
- Ozaki, Mayumi (1992). ヒールのテキスト [Text for Heels] (in Japanese). Vol. 1. Toru Shinohara, cartoonist. リイド社. ISBN 9784845804955.
- Ozaki, Mayumi (1992). ヒールのテキスト [Text for Heels] (in Japanese). Vol. 2. Toru Shinohara, cartoonist. リイド社. ISBN 9784845804962.
- Ozaki, Mayumi (1992). ヒールのテキスト [Text for Heels] (in Japanese). Vol. 3. Toru Shinohara, cartoonist. リイド社. ISBN 978-4845804979.

=== Videos ===
- Mayumi Ozaki (player), KAORU (player), JWP (sponsor), WOWOW (video), Quest (producer) (2009). Mayumi Ozaki vs KAORU, October 20, 1994 (Sapporo Teisen Hall) (color, stereo, standard). JWP History of Fierce Battle - tag team match, AJW vs GAEA Japan (DVD 244 minutes) (in Japanese). ISBN 978-4-86308-193-2. SPD-4110.
- Mayumi Ozaki (player), Cutie Suzuki (player), Dynamite Kansai (player), JWP Women's Professional Wrestling (sponsor), WOWOW/FIGHTING TV Samurai (video), RING STARS (image) (2012). Dynamite Kansai vs Mayumi Ozaki, August 10 and Mayumi Ozaki vs Cutie Suzuki, October 15, 1996 (Korakuen Hall). Lineage - Queens of JWP Open Weight - JWP 20th anniversary (DVD 240 minutes) (in Japanese). Vol. 1. Tokyo, Japan: Quest. ISBN 978-4-86308-389-9. SPD-4115.
- Mayumi Ozaki (player), Kyoko Inoue (player), Takako Inoue (player), Cutie Suzuki (player), Jet Link (producer) (2014). Kyoko Inoue, Takako Inoue vs Mayumi Ozaki, Cutie Suzuki (color, monoral, standard). All Star Dreamslam - 25th anniversary, All Japan Women’s pro wrestling. April 2nd, 1993, Yokohama. (DVD 395 minutes) (in Japanese). Vol. disk 3. Kanagawa, Japan: Pony Canyon. PCBE-63500.
- Yumiko Hotta (player), Manami Toyota (player), Sakie Hasegawa (player), Mayumi Ozaki (player), Plum Mariko (player), Hikari Fukuoka (player), Jet Link (producer) (2015). High tension triple impact - Yumiko Hotta, Manami Toyota, Sakie Hasegawa vs Mayumi Ozaki, Plum Mariko, Hikari Fukuoka (color, monoral, standard). Legacy of queens, 25th Anniversary match - All Japan Women Pro-Wrestling. August 25, 1993 at Budokan (2 DVD, 345 minutes). AJW Legendary DVD (in Japanese). Vol. 3. Tokyo: Pony Canyon. PCBE-53971.
- Dynamite Kansai (player), Mayumi Ozaki (player), Inoue (player), Rumi Kazama (player), Toshiyo Mamada (player), Mausmi Toyota (player), Jet Link (producer) (2015). WWWA World tag match championship at Kokugikan - full voltage - Dynamite Kansai, Mayumi Ozaki vs Toshie Yamada, Manami Toyota (color, monoral, standard). Super women story final, 25th Anniversary match - All Japan Women Pro-Wrestling, December 6, 1993 at Kokugikan (2 DVD, 300 minutes). AJW Legendary DVD (in Japanese). Vol. 5. Tokyo: Pony Canyon. PCBE-53973.
- Mayumi Ozaki (player), Cutie Suzuki (player), Etsuko Mita (player), Mima Shimoda (player), Jet Link (producer) (2015). Rowdy Pirates air assault Pure Hearts: JWP tag team match - Mayumi Ozaki, Cutie Suzuki vs Etsuko Mita, Mima Shimoda (color, monoral, standard). Wrestling Queendom - All Japan Women Pro-Wrestling all star game, March 27, 1994 at Yokohama Arena (2 DVD, 293 minutes). AJW Legendary DVD (in Japanese). Vol. 6. Kanagawa, Japan: Pony Canyon. PCBE-53974.

=== Music ===
- Various artists (1994). Mayumi Ozaki - The Last Stand (original song) [Pure Heart - theme songs for JWP Women's Professional Wrestlers]. ピュア・ハート JWP女子プロレステーマ曲集. Compilation album. Tokyo, Japan: Vap. VPCC-81050.
