= Dynamite Kansai =

Japanese professional wrestler

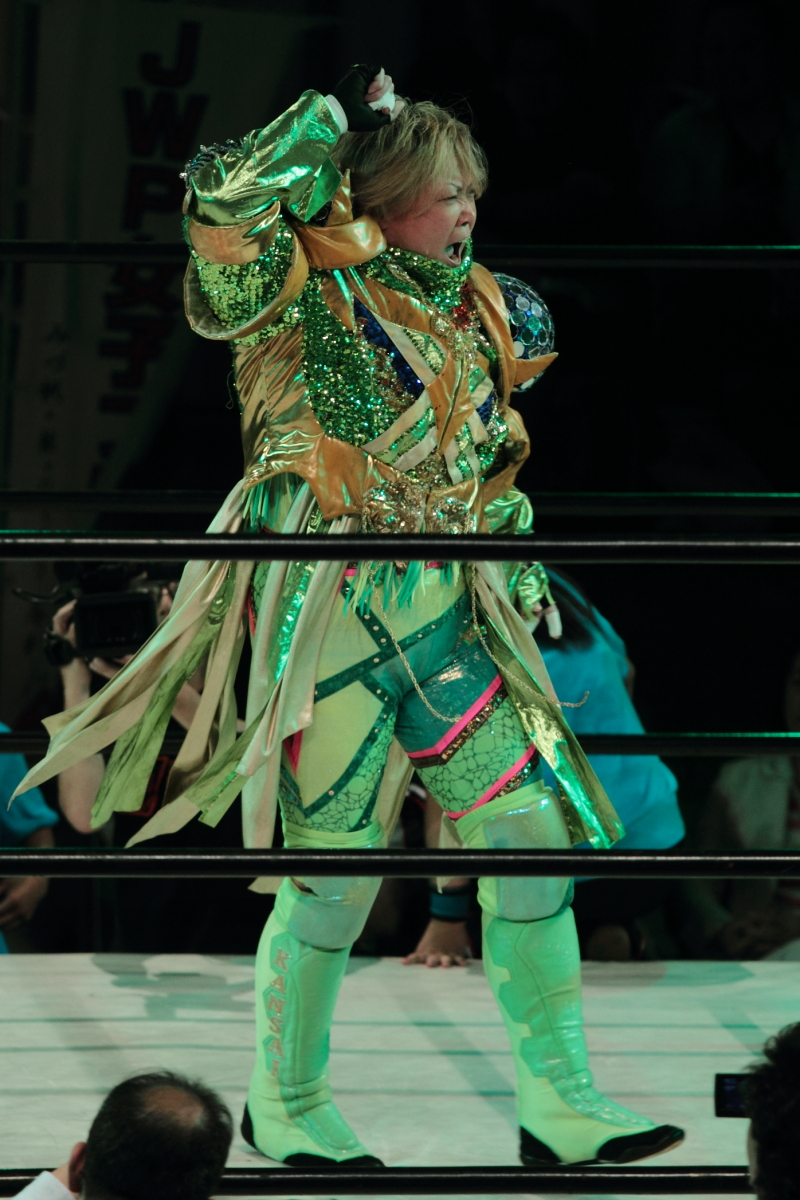
- Kansai in August 2015

Personal information
- Born: Chieko Suzuki; December 4, 1969 (age 56) Kyoto, Kyoto, Japan

Professional wrestling career
- Ring name(s): Dynamite Kansai; Miss A
- Billed height: 1.73 m (5 ft 8 in)
- Billed weight: 93 kg (205 lb)
- Debut: August 17, 1986
- Retired: December 11, 2016

Chieko Suzuki (鈴木 智江子, Suzuki Chieko; born December 4, 1969) is a retired Japanese female professional wrestler, better known by the ring name Dynamite Kansai (ダイナマイト関西, Dainamaito Kansai).

== Career ==
Chieko Suzuki was born on December 4, 1969, and was raised in Kyoto, Japan. In 1986 she auditioned for All Japan Women's Pro-Wrestling (AJW), but was unsuccessful, and instead joined the first rookie class of Japan Women's Pro-Wrestling. She debuted on August 17, 1986 in Korakuen Hall, Tokyo under the ring name Miss A. When Japan Women's Pro-Wrestling was dissolved, Suzuki became part of the JWP Project. She wrestled in the United States for World Championship Wrestling, but returned to Japan in 1991, and changed her ring name to Dynamite Kansai. After leaving Japan Women's Pro-Wrestling in the mid-1990s, she joined a new wrestling promotion organisation, GAEA Japan. In 2006, she worked for Mayumi Ozaki's promotion, OZ Academy. In 2015, Kansai returned to the United States for the first time in twenty-four years, appearing for Shimmer Women Athletes alongside Aja Kong. In 2012, she was diagnosed with lung cancer and was declared cancer-free after a four-year battle. Kansai ended her 30-year career on December 11, 2016, defeating Mayumi Ozaki in her retirement match.

== Championships and accomplishments ==
- All Japan Women's Pro-Wrestling
  - WWWA World Single Championship (1 time)
  - WWWA World Tag Team Championship (1 time) – with Mayumi Ozaki
- Gaea Japan
  - AAAW Single Championship (1 time)
- JWP Joshi Puroresu
  - JWP Openweight Championship (2 times)
  - JWP Tag Team Championship (3 times) – with Cutie Suzuki (2) and Devil Masami (1)
- Oz Academy
  - Oz Academy Openweight Championship (1 time)
  - Oz Academy Tag Team Championship (1 time) – with Carlos Amano
- Pro Wrestling Wave
  - Dual Shock Wave (2016) – with Rina Yamashita
- Wrestling Observer Newsletter
  - Match of the Year (1993) with Mayumi Ozaki vs. Manami Toyota and Toshiyo Yamada
