= TNA Knockouts =

Female talent in Total Nonstop Action Wrestling (TNA)

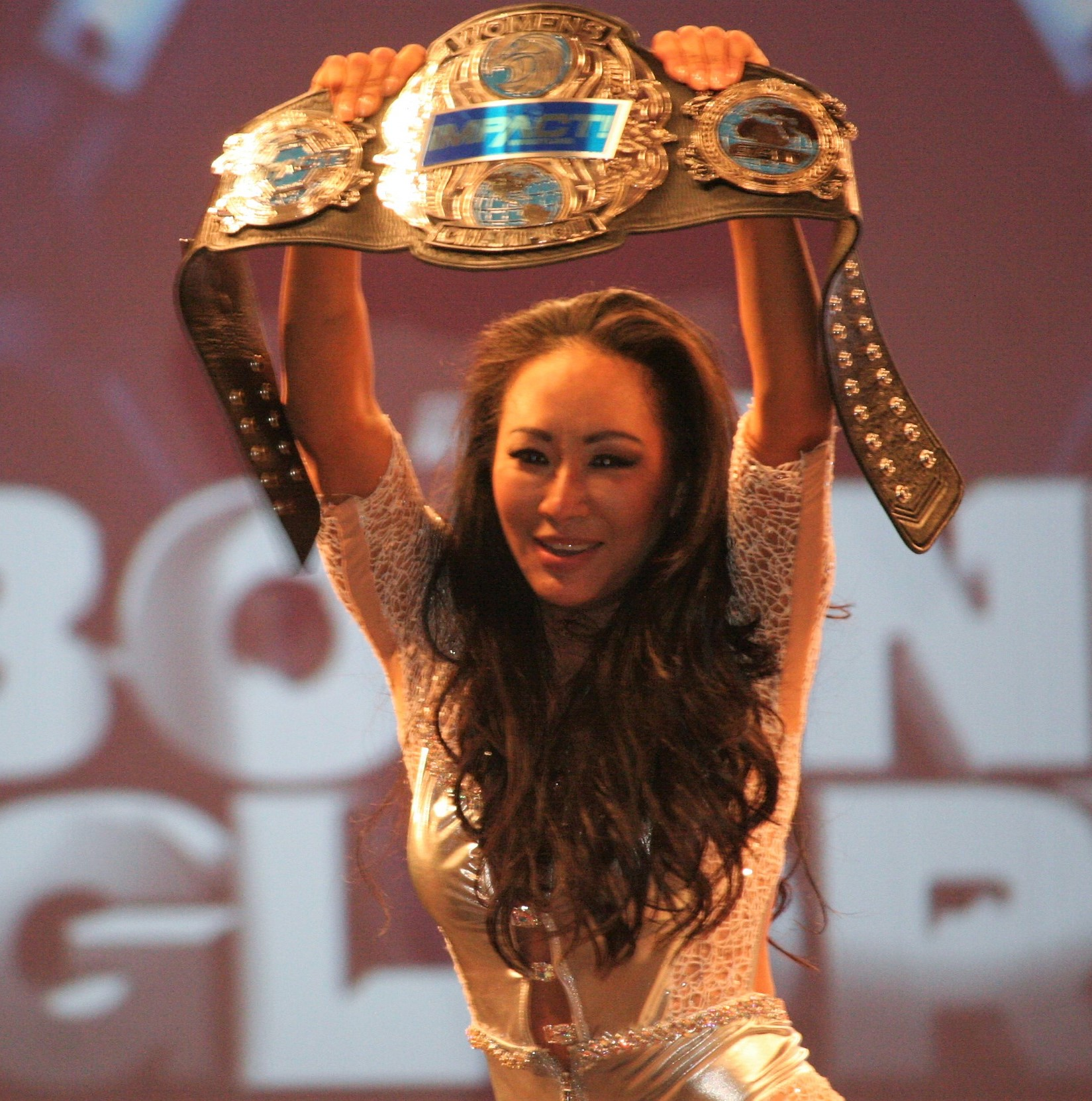
- TNA Hall of Famer Gail Kim with the Knockouts Championship belt after winning it for the 7th time at Bound For Glory 2017.
- Acronym: KO
- Founded: 2002; re-launched as a permanent women's division in 2007
- Style: Women's professional wrestling
- Parent: Total Nonstop Action Wrestling (TNA)
- Formerly: Impact Knockouts (2017–2024); GFW Knockouts (2017)
- Website: www.tnawrestling.com

Knockout is a term used by Total Nonstop Action Wrestling (TNA) to refer to its female talent. The term is applied universally to wrestlers, backstage interviewers, and managers/valets.

== History ==
=== Early history ===
TNA Knocked Out DVD featuring former TNA Wrestling worker and authority figure Karen Jarrett.

The term Knockouts was not used when Total Nonstop Action debuted in 2002. The name originated from a DVD release in 2006 by the company, Knockouts: The Ladies of TNA Wrestling, Vol.1, which focused on its then-current female stars. The name "Knockouts" as a catch-all name for the women stuck after that. Female performers have been a part of TNA since the first national show, which featured Alexis Laree, Elektra, Erin Bray, Francine, Miss Joni, Sasha, Shannon, Taylor Vaughn and Teresa Tyler, as well as other female talent, including backstage interviewer Goldy Locks and valets Aleesha and Fluff Dupp. Bobcat also debuted as a valet in a match that was taped during the first PPV, but aired during the second PPV.

=== Miss TNA (2002) ===
A Lingerie Battle Royal to crown the first 'Miss TNA' was taped during the very first NWA:TNA weekly PPV on June 19, 2002, and was aired during the second PPV on June 26, 2002. Taylor Vaughn won the first Miss TNA crown. She defended the title against Francine, who soon afterward abandoned her pursuit of the title and engaged in a brief feud with Jasmin St. Claire. Vaughn lost the title when she was defeated by male character Bruce a few weeks later. Although male, he claimed that he should be entitled to wrestle for the Miss TNA crown because he was gay. Bruce held the crown for three months, and during his time as Miss TNA, he attacked many female wrestlers and fans, enraging the male stars of TNA including Jorge Estrada. The two then had a singles match with the stipulation that if Estrada won, Priscilla would become the new Miss TNA. Although Estrada won the match, the crown didn't change hands because he won by disqualification. In the next weeks, Bruce's tag team partner, Lenny, tried to get Bruce injured (since the runner-up would then take over the crown should the champion be injured). This led to the breakup of The Rainbow Express, and Bruce's homosexuality was questioned by backstage interviewer Goldy Locks, who claimed she had seen him in the shower with April Pennington. The storyline soon came to a close due to poor crowd reception, with Pennington and Goldylocks walking off together holding hands, as Lenny and Bruce fought over Pennington. The storyline ended with Bruce declaring himself straight and handing his crown over to Pennington. The Miss TNA crown wasn't mentioned on-screen afterward. Throughout 2002, TNA also featured Belladonna in a valet role and former WWE Tough Enough contestant Paulina as a bodyguard.

=== Post–Miss TNA (2003–2006) ===
Women's wrestling continued to be a feature of the weekly PPVs before an official women's division was established in 2007. In 2003, cage dancers (many of whom were independent female wrestlers who were then unknown at the time, including Lollipop) were used near the top of the entrance ramp, but this concept was abandoned shortly after its conception. One of TNA's early controversial moments ensued on the March 12, 2003, pay-per-view when Lollipop had her top ripped off during a catfight with S.E.X. member Holly Wood and exposed her breasts throughout the fight. TNA also featured ring girl Athena in many feuds and altercations.

From 2003-2004, TNA regularly used several female wrestlers on their PPVs and television programs, including Trinity, Desire, Alexis Laree, Traci Brooks, Cheerleader Melissa, Nurse Veronica (who also competed as Simply Luscious), and Cheerleader Valentina (who also competed as JV Love); however, they were often primarily depicted as valets who occasionally wrestled. Of all the women utilized at this time, Trinity was the most active in the ring, as she feuded with Desire, Alexis Laree, and Traci Brooks, as well as competed in the X Division. During this time, TNA also briefly featured an all-female faction named "Bitchslap" that consisted of Nurse Veronica, Traci Brooks, Cheerleader Valentina, and Trinity (who only appeared twice with the group). They were engaged in a feud with TNA dancers Lollipop and April Pennington.

Independent female wrestlers were frequently featured on TNA Xplosion and occasionally on TNA pay-per-views, including Angel Williams (who would later return as Angelina Love), April Hunter, Brandi Wine, Daizee Haze, Lucy (who previously competed as Shannon and would later return as Daffney), Malia Hosaka, Mercedes Martinez, MsChif, and ODB (who also wrestled as Poison).

TNA briefly recognized the NWA World Women's Championship in 2003. On March 12, 2003, Leilani Kai defeated Madison to win the NWA World Women's Championship in a dark match on a TNA pay-per-view. On April 19, 2003, Kai defended the title against Desire at a house show, but she was later stripped of the title by NWA President Bill Behrens due to missing several subsequent NWA shows. According to Kai, she skipped the shows because she felt the NWA governing board was not treating the Women's Championship with the respect it deserved, such as not televising title matches on the TNA pay-per-views and TNA Xplosion.

Fewer women's matches were featured toward the end of 2004 and throughout 2005; however, TNA did feature pay-per-view matches pitting Trinity against former WWE Diva Jacqueline and Traci Brooks. TNA also featured Minsa in an on-air non-wrestling role.

Following the debut of the TNA iMPACT! television program in 2005, TNA featured former WWE Divas such as Gail Kim, Jackie Gayda, and Christy Hemme, as well as independent female wrestler Sirelda in prominent on-air roles and feuds. Although most of the prior female talent had left TNA by this time, Traci Brooks remained in an on-air role and TNA added a new ring girl, SoCal Val (replacing Athena) and backstage interviewer, Leticia Cline (replacing Goldy Locks). Gail Kim competed in a few matches that were televised and/or taped throughout 2006 against Sirelda and Traci Brooks, while independent wrestler Amber O'Neal competed at TNA house shows in matches against Kim and Jacqueline. In the fall of 2006, Sherri Martel appeared on TNA iMPACT! in her final televised appearance before her death the following year.

=== Knockouts Division (2007–present) ===
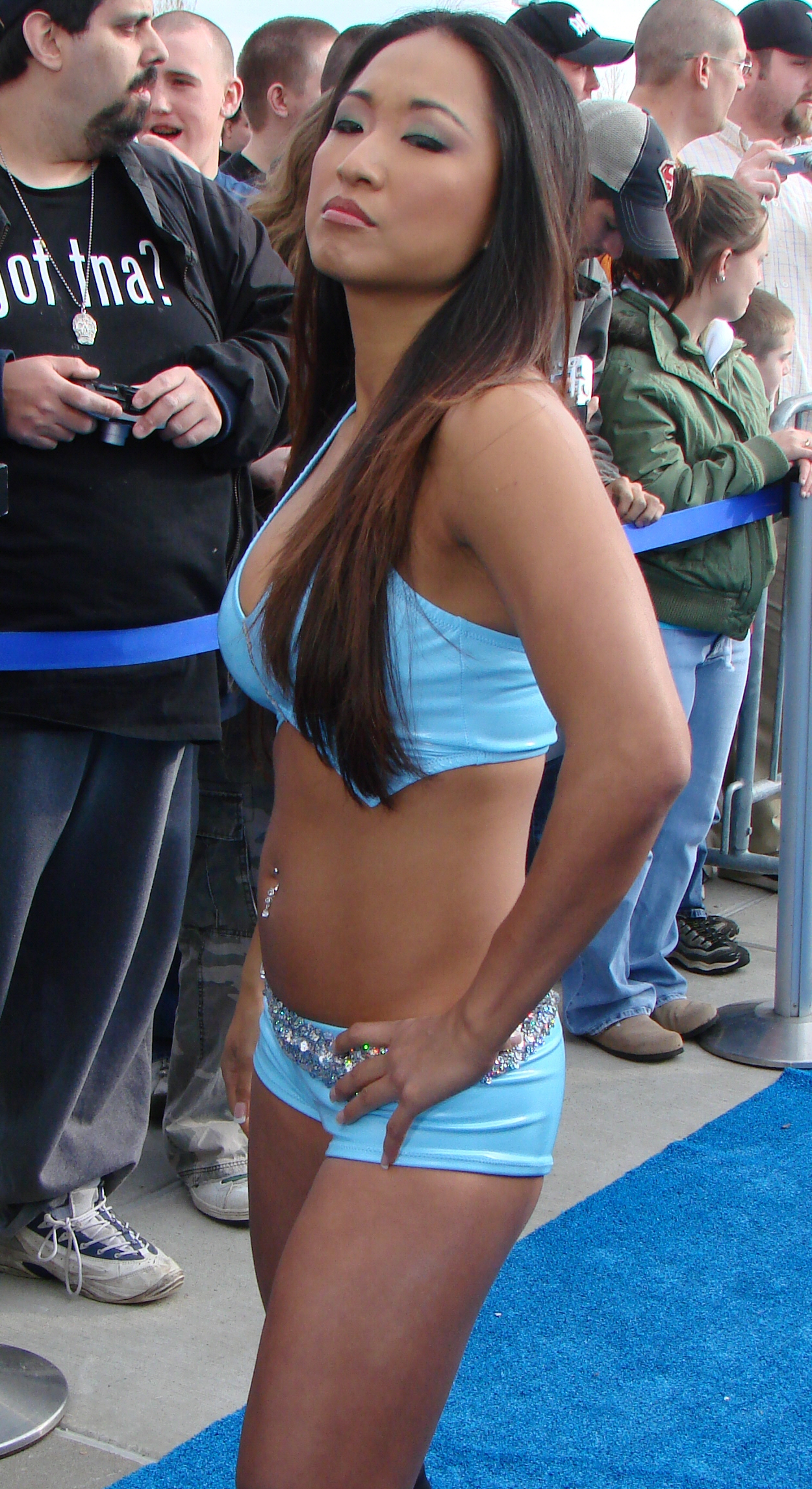
Inaugural and 7-time TNA Knockouts Champion and first female Impact Hall of Famer Gail Kim.

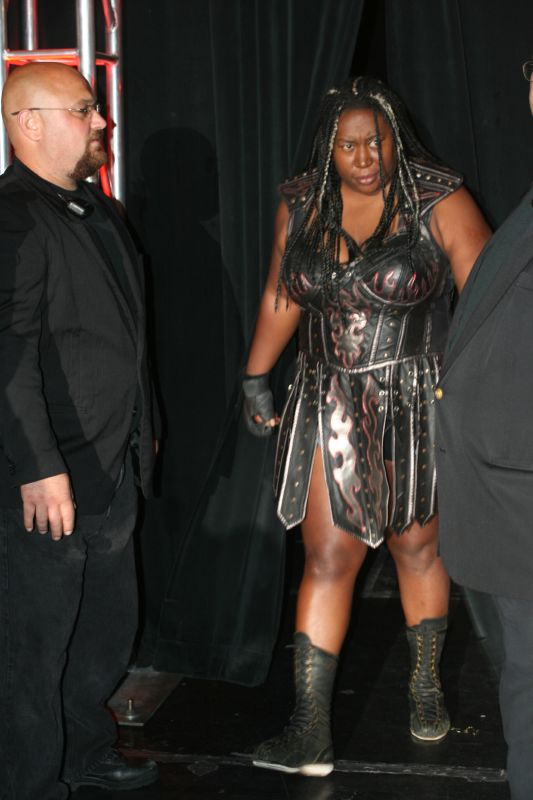
Former 2-time TNA Knockouts Champion and second female Impact Hall of Famer Awesome Kong.

The formation of an official women's division began at Final Resolution in 2007 as TNA spent the early part of the year building up the feud between Gail Kim and Jacqueline, who made her on-air return at the pay-per-view also during the summer a feud between Christy Hemme and Roxxi Laveaux took place. The first TNA Women's Knockout Champion was crowned on October 14, 2007, at Bound for Glory in a 10–Knockout gauntlet match which Gail Kim won with lastly eliminating Roxxi Laveaux. Around this time, TNA signed several additional female wrestlers and personalities, including Angel Williams, Amazing Kong, ODB, Shelly Martinez, and Talia Madison who were then renamed after the PPV, as well as valet Karen Jarrett and new backstage interviewer Crystal Louthan. In a stark departure to TNA's past programming where their female talent were often promoted as eye candy with little to no emphasis on athleticism or wrestling ability, in the same fashion as their WWE Diva counterparts during that time period, TNA's women's division emphasized on serious wrestling competition between their female talent, as well as their credibility on par with their male counterparts. Since the inception of an official championship, matches and segments involving the Knockouts have contributed to drawing some of the better ratings of Impact shows.

Since 2008, TNA continued to expand the women's division by featuring various prospective independent talents, veterans, and reality show winners such as Sharmell, Taylor Wilde, Daffney, Tara, Hamada, Sarita, Mickie James, and Survivor: The Amazon winner Jenna Morasca while Lauren Brooke became the new backstage interviewer at Lockdown and Daizee Haze who appeared in the first few years of the company returned in a one time match on May 1 losing to Cheerleader Melissa who was also pulling dual role under the Raisha Saeed gimmick at that time.

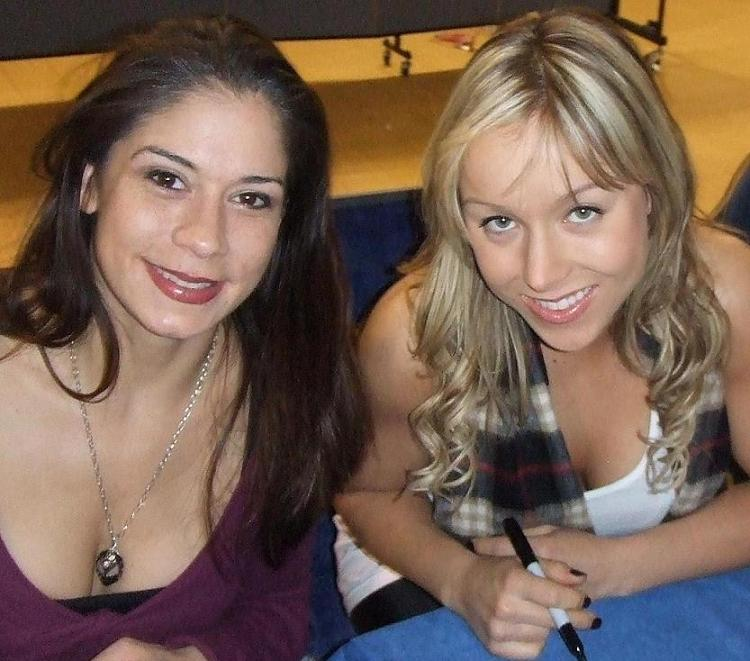
A picture of Sarita and Taylor Wilde, the first TNA Knockouts Tag Team Champions

The division would see the start of many various changes when in August, Gail Kim's contract with TNA expired and instead of renewing it, she decided to return to rival WWE for a second run. At the start of the following year in 2009, Madison Rayne debuted in TNA on January 8 and became the third member of The Beautiful People alongside existing members Angelina Love and Velvet Sky which made the tag team a stable and the TNA Knockouts Tag Team Championship was introduced at No Surrender and Sarita and Taylor Wilde became the first TNA Knockouts Tag Team Champions when they won the final match of an eight–team tournament.

The women's division would see a start of vast departures in fall of 2009 beginning when Angelina Love left the company on September 3 due to visa work issue, Love was replaced by Lacey Von Erich in the Beautiful People stable and then immediately returned to the company the following year on January 14. Later on, Awesome Kong, Alissa Flash, Roxxi, Traci Brooks, Roxxi, ODB, and Tara (although would return two months later on July 11 at Victory Road) all departed from the company mutually or due to controversial circumstances. Madison Rayne made history by becoming the first person to hold both the Women's Knockout Championship and the Knockouts Tag Team Championship simultaneously at Lockdown. On August 8, Francine appeared in a pre-taped interview at the ECW reunion themed Hardcore Justice and Lacey Von Erich, Hamada, and Taylor Wilde departed from the company at the end of the year. Despite departures during this time period, the division continued to grow.

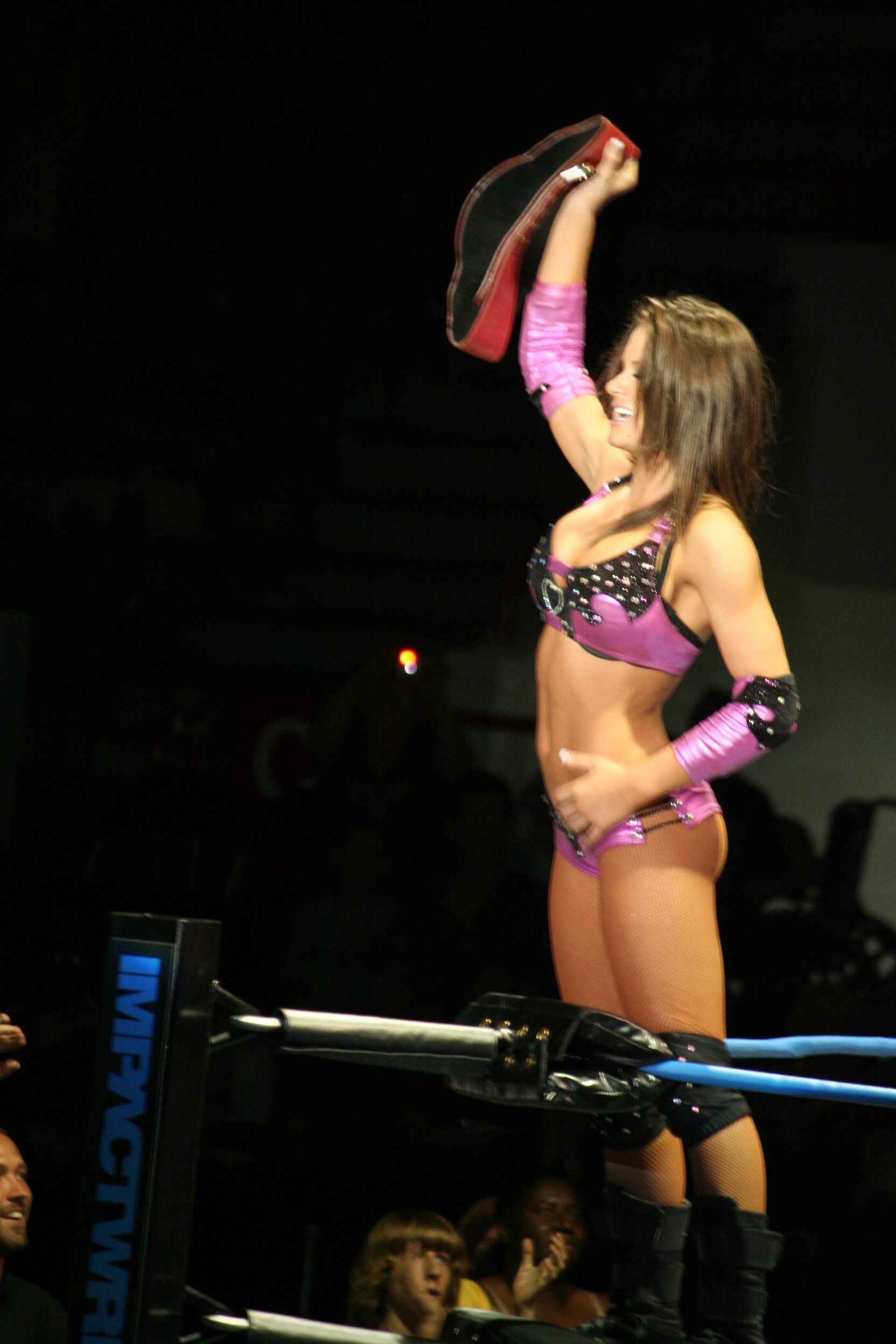
Miss Tessmacher with the TNA Knockouts Tag Team Championship in 2011

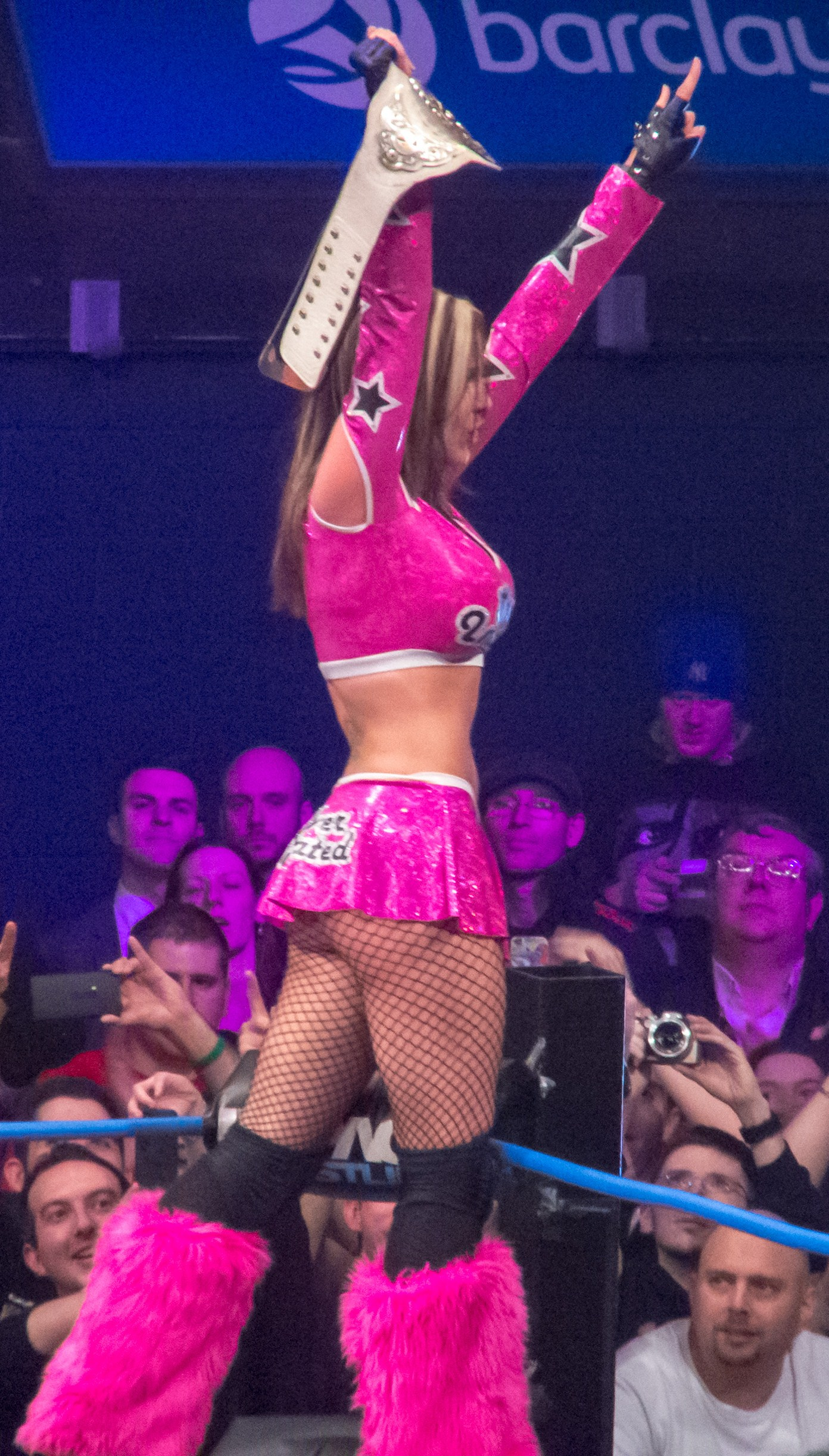
Velvet Sky as the TNA Knockouts Champion during year 2013

Despite initially departing the company in individual time periods, Angelina Love, Velvet Sky, Awesome Kong, Alissa Flash, Traci Brooks, Roxxi, ODB, Jacqueline, SoCal Val, Mickie James, Thea Trinidad, Karen Jarrett, Christy Hemme, Taryn Terrell, Brooke, Katarina, and Madison Rayne would return to the company in later years either full-time or short lived runs and through special appearances.

In the years of 2011-2013 in which on March 15, 2011, Daffney's contract with TNA expired and was not renewed. then 7 months later, Gail Kim returned to TNA, after spending the past three years with WWE during her second run. Taeler Hendrix was signed to a contract through the company's Gut Check Challenge, becoming the first ever woman to win the contest and in August 2012, Taryn Terrell joined the division as the official referee although later on would be transitioned into an active role to receive a push to feud with Gail Kim. Sarita departed from TNA entering the year of 2013 after her contract would expire. Lei'D Tapa became the second female talent signed to a contract through the Gut Check Challenge. In the summer, the TNA Knockouts Tag Team Championship would be deactivated when on the June 20, 2013, episode of Impact Wrestling, Knockouts Division Executive Brooke Hogan stripped ODB and Eric Young of the title because Young was a male talent. This ultimately resulted in the titles being no longer being listed among TNA's active championships. The women's division would see again the start of vast departures when SoCal Val, Madison Rayne, Tara, Mickie James, and Taeler Hendrix all departed from the company entering the month of July to mid-Fall mutually; Rayne was originally granted a maternity leave in early March due to real life pregnancy, Hendrix's departure made Lei'D Tapa the only female talent signed from the short-lived Gut Check Challenge, and SoCal Val's departure left Christy Hemme as the longest tenured female talent within the company. The vast departures lead to Christy Hemme, Gail Kim, Velvet Sky, ODB, Brooke, Taryn Terrell, Lei'D Tapa, Hannah Blossom, Holly Blossom, Rebel, and Brittany remaining and continuing on with the company. Taryn Terrell would be granted a maternity leave in August due to real life pregnancy. Madison Rayne would return to the company in late November after departing from the company earlier in the March.

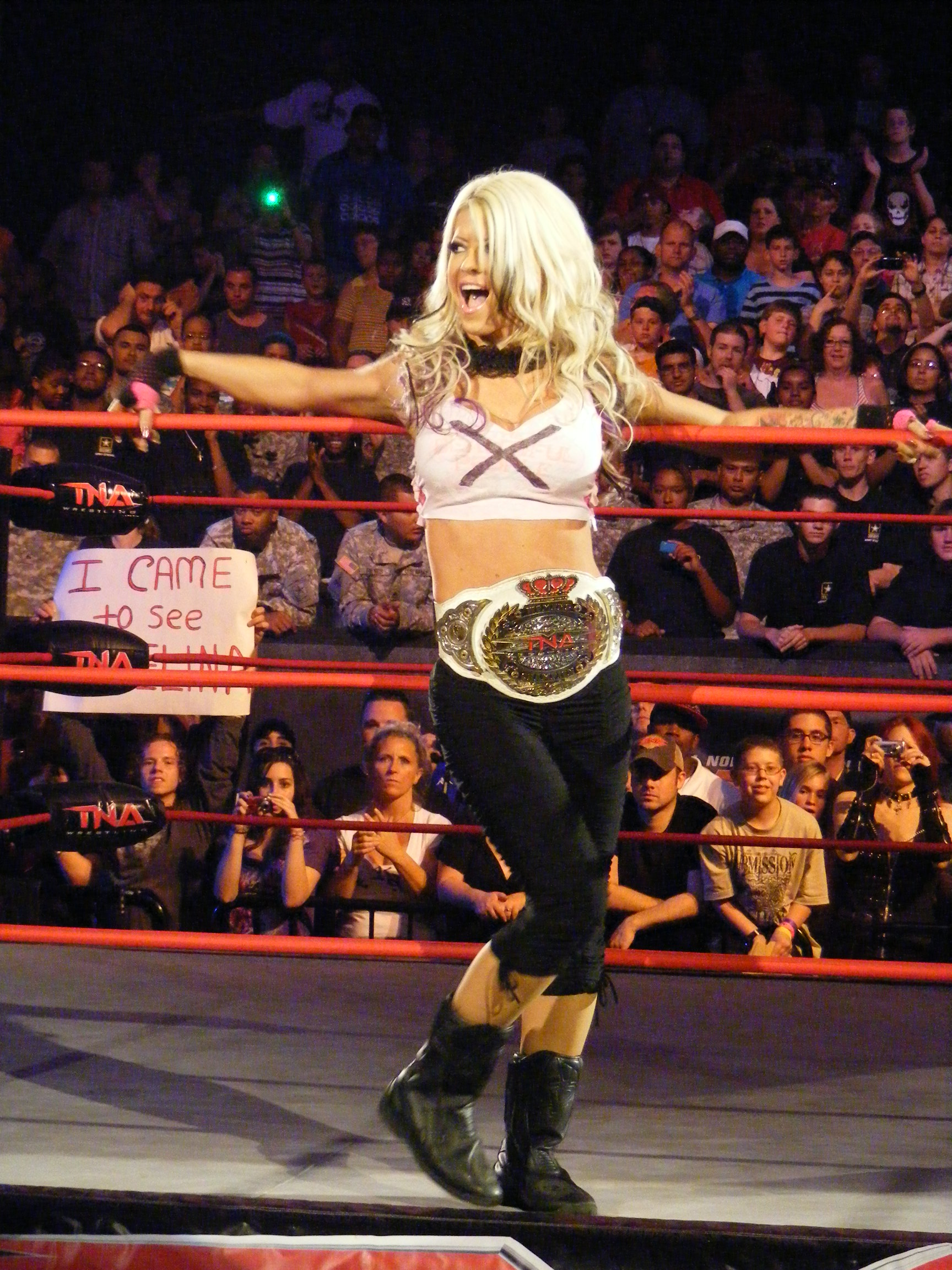
Angelina Love, the first 6-times to win the Knockouts Championship

Angelina Love would win the Knockouts Championship at the Sacrifice pay-per-view for a record-breaking sixth time A few days later, Lei'D Tapa departed from the company after her contract expired. Throughout August, vignettes hyping the debut of Havok would air on Impact Wrestling. Havok made her debut by attacking Gail Kim and Taryn Terrell after their title match on the September 3 broadcast of Impact Wrestling. During the tapings of Impact Wrestling on September 16, Havok defeated Kim in the main event of Impact Wrestling to win the TNA Women's Knockout Championship for the first time; the match aired on tape delay on October 1. Havok lost the championship three days later to Taryn Terrell in a three-way match that also involved Gail Kim; the match aired on tape delay on November 19.

Towards the end of the year of 2015 in October, for the first time ever, the TNA Knockouts entered a tournament for the vacant TNA World Heavyweight Championship; Awesome Kong, Gail Kim, Madison Rayne, and Brooke were revealed to being the representatives of the women's division in the group. Brooke announced her departure from the company on November 24. On December 29, just weeks before TNA's début on Pop TV, Maria Kanellis signed with the company. At Bound for Glory, Awesome Kong, Taryn Terrell, and Christy Hemme made a special appearance to induct Gail Kim in the TNA Hall of Fame. Throughout 2016, the division included various competitors who just joined the company. Most of them had title reigns with the Knockouts Championship, such as Jade, Sienna and Allie. In 2017, at Slammiversary XV, Sienna defeated Rosemary in a unification match which saw the TNA Knockouts Championship and GFW Women's Championship get unified. During Sienna's reign the title was renamed to Impact Wrestling Knockouts Championship. Shortly after, at Bound for Glory, Gail Kim won the title for the record–setting seventh time and also became the first woman to retire while holding the title. Kim would transition to behind the scenes as a producer. After Kim's retirement, the Knockouts Championship would become vacant in late 2017 as a 6-woman tournament would be held in which Laurel Van Ness defeated Rosemary in the finals to win the championship for the first time.

Two years later, Gail Kim would come out of retirement in a storyline with Tessa Blanchard. Both eventually faced off at Rebellion as Blanchard defeated Kim. Kim would officially retire. Four months later, Tessa Blanchard became the first woman to main event at Slammiversary XVII against Sami Callihan in an intergender match. Most of the year of 2019 revolved around Tessa Blanchard and her continued feud with Sami Callihan and his faction, Ohio Versus Everything. Towards the end of the year of 2019 on the company's premiere on AXS Television, Blanchard became the number one contender for the Impact World Championship after winning a mini tournament. In this year also, Taya Valkyrie became the longest reigning Knockouts Champion surpassing Taryn Terrell.

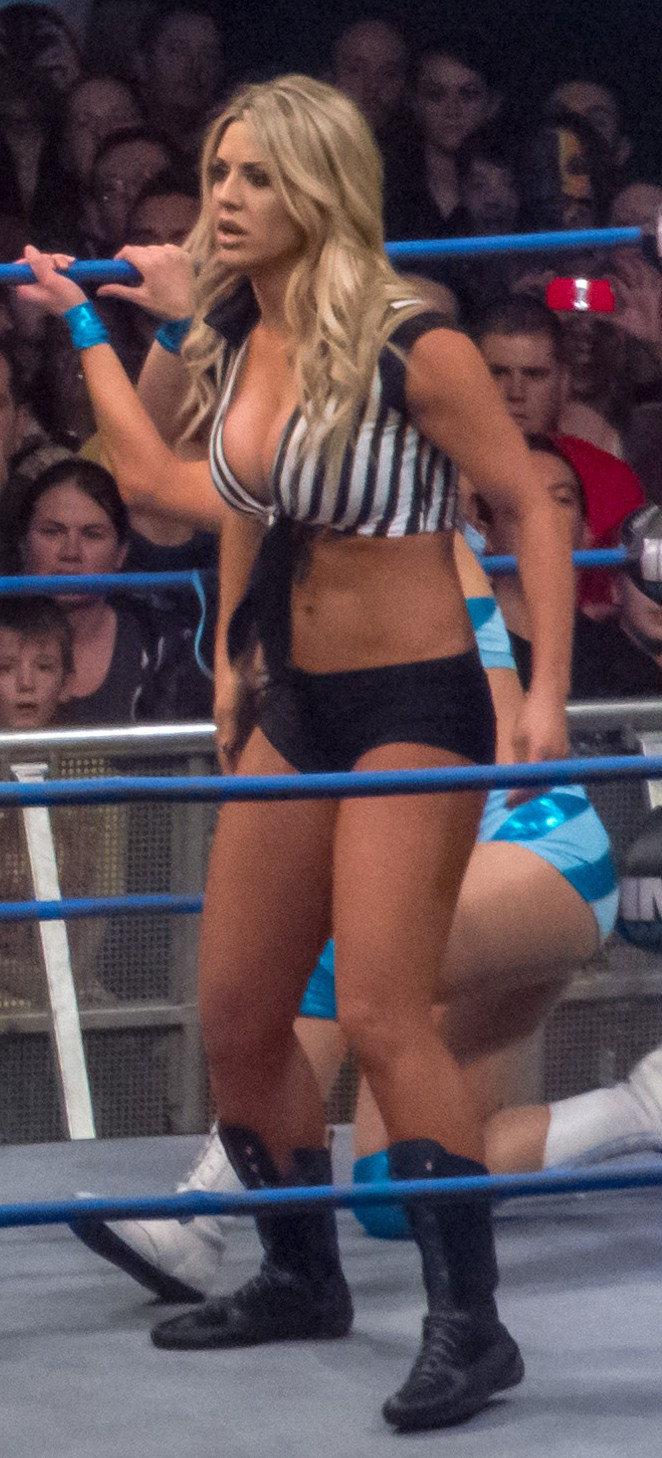
Taryn Terrell, whose 279-day reign with the Knockouts Championship set a record at the time.

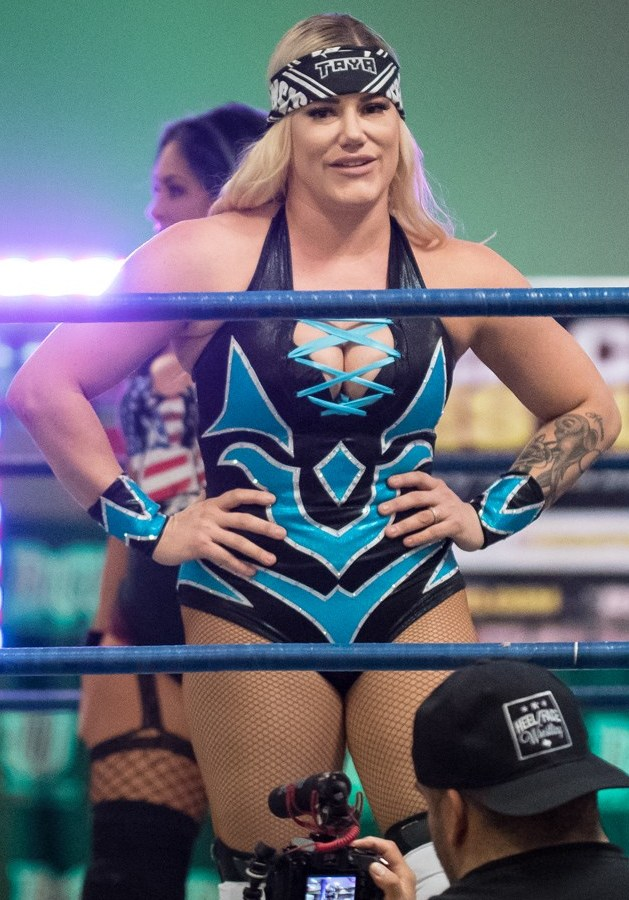
Taya Valkyrie, who currently holds this record with 377 days as champion.

On January 12, 2020, at Hard To Kill, Tessa Blanchard became the first woman to win the Impact World Championship. Blanchard also became the first woman in professional wrestling to win a major male world championship, making history.

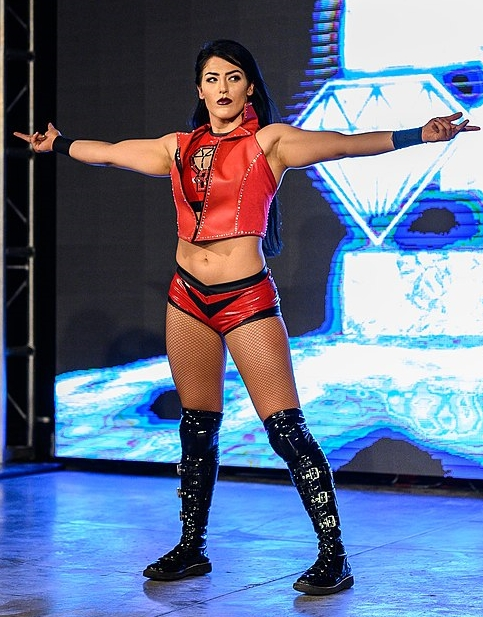
First woman to hold the Impact World Championship, Tessa Blanchard.

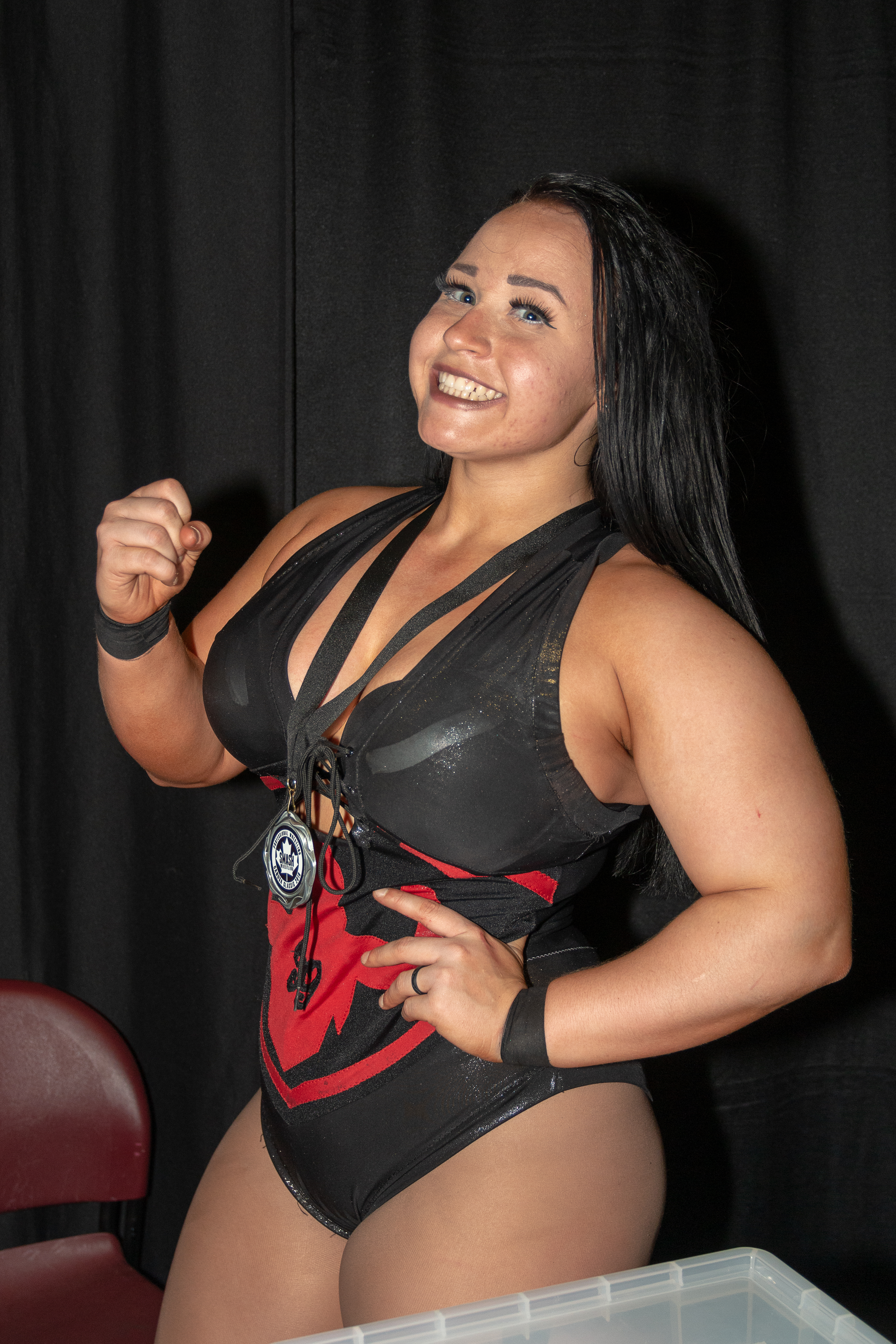
A picture of the inaugural Impact Digital Media Champion Jordynne Grace

On August 24 at the second night of Emergence special, Deonna Purrazzo defended the Knockouts Championship against Jordynne Grace in the first Knockouts 30-minute Iron man match in Impact history, where Purrazzo was victorious with two falls over one.

On October 23, 2021 Jordynne Grace also made history when she became the first Knockout to become the Impact Digital Media Champion a intergender title that is a mostly male dominant title in Sunrise Manor, NV at Bound for Glory of 2021 by defeating Chelsea Green, Crazzy Steve, Fallah Bahh, John Skyler, and Madison Rayne in a tournament final intergender six-way match to become the inaugural champion.

On October 21, 2023 at Bound for Glory of 2023 Jordynne Grace once more made history by becoming the first women / knockout to win the first Impact! 20-person Intergender Call Your Shot Gauntlet by last eliminating Bully Ray.

At Slammiversary on June 28, 2026, TNA Hall of Famer Traci Brooks announced the TNA Knockouts Television Championship. She also announced a tournament featuring 16 Knockouts to crown the inaugural champion, with tournament set to begin on the July 2 episode of Thursday Night Impact!. On the August 26, 2026 episode of TNA Impact! M By Elegance defeated Jada Stone in the Knockouts TV title tournament to become the inaugural champion.

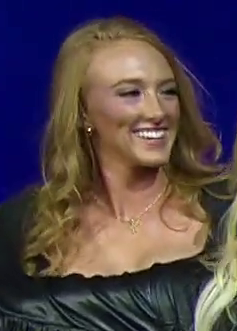
Inaugural champion M by Elegance

== Knockouts Division authority figure ==
In August 2008, it was announced on TNAwrestling.com that Traci Brooks was officially in charge of the Knockouts Division as the Knockouts Division Commissioner, also known as the "Knockout Law". On screen credit was given to Jim Cornette (at the time, the highest position of on-screen authority the fans saw), who was fed up with the Knockouts, and needed someone who "spoke their language" to control them. In January 2009, Brooks stopped appearing in TNA and Cornette resumed control over the Knockout division. Brooks returned on the March 12, 2009, edition of Impact! as a referee. She was released on March 4, 2010. Since the year of 2009, there has been five female talents who were appointed the role of authority figure in the women's division.

Knockouts authority figure:	Date:	Event:	Notes:
Traci Brooks	August 2008 — January 2009	TNAWrestling.com	Was appointed the job as Knockouts Division Commissioner by former TNA Managing Director Jim Cornette after volunteering for it
Miss Tessmacher	September 30, 2010 — October 14, 2010	TNA Reaction	Was named as the General Manager of the Knockouts Division by former Impact Wrestling Executive Producer Eric Bischoff
Karen Jarrett	September 1, 2011 — December 15, 2011	Impact Wrestling	Was named as the Executive Vice President of the Knockouts Division by former Impact Executive Producer Eric Bischoff
Brooke Hogan	May 31, 2012 — August 16, 2013	Impact Wrestling	Appointed as the Vice President of the Knockouts by her father, former Impact General Manager Hulk Hogan
Maria Kanellis-Bennett	April 19, 2016 — September 8, 2016	Impact Wrestling	Won a six–way ladder match made by on-screen executive Billy Corgan to receive full control as Leader of the Knockouts Division
Gail Kim	December 2021 — March 2025	Impact Wrestling	Was appointed the job as Knockouts Division Commissioner by TNA Managing Director Scott D'Amore

== Promotion ==
The popularity of women in TNA has resulted cross-promotion with other brands featuring the TNA Knockouts.

=== TNA Knockout DVDs and television specials ===
Knockouts: The Ladies of TNA Wrestling

- In 2006, TNA released the first Knockouts DVD entitled Knockouts: The Ladies of TNA Wrestling which featured Christy Hemme, Gail Kim, Jackie Gayda, SoCal Val, and Traci Brooks; much similar to their rival company female talent, this video release was the first and only DVD where the Knockouts were featured in select outdoor locations.
- In 2008, TNA released their second Knockouts DVD on October 7, 2008, entitled TNA Knockouts: Knocked Out which featured Angelina Love, Awesome Kong, Christy Hemme, Gail Kim, Jacqueline, Karen Jarrett, Lauren, ODB, Raisha Saeed, Rhaka Khan, Roxxi, Salinas, Sharmell, SoCal Val, Traci Brooks, Taylor Wilde, and Velvet Sky documenting the 1st anniversary of the launching of the division. Karen Jarrett was chosen for the cover, with an alternative cover featuring Christy Hemme.
- In 2017, Impact released the first female anthology entitled The Essential Gail Kim Collection which revolved around Gail Kim's professional wrestling career including her time with the company in her two tenures showcasing favorite matches and her Hall of Fame induction.

The popularity of women in Impact Wrestling has also resulted in the company devoting pay-per-view to television specials to the women's division. At the end of the year of 2009 on December 31, TNA promoted a special four-hour, all Knockout episode of Impact!, titled New Year's Knockout Eve, which featured a tournament for the number one contendership to the Women's Knockout Championship. April Hunter who competed with the organization in its early years returned in this special competing in a tag team match. Six years later, TNA announced the second Knockouts-themed show for the first time which aired on April 17, 2015, titled 'TKO: Total Knockouts'.

In the year of 2010, TNA premiered an all Knockout highlight pay-per-view special on October 1, titled TNA Knockouts: Mad Sexy Volume 1, featuring the best matches in the history of the Knockout division. as Volume 2 premiered February 1, 2011. Three years later, TNA recorded an all knockouts pay-per-view on March 7, which aired on September 6, titled TNA Knockouts Knockdown. It was part of special series of pay-per-views released by TNA called TNA One Night Only. Since the start of the first event, Trinity, Jacqueline, Alissa Flash, Sojournor Bolt, MaryKate, Thea Trinidad, and Shelly Martinez made special appearances for the company's annual event.

=== TNA Knockouts Trading Cards ===
TRISTAR Productions released a TNA Knockouts trading card series on April 28, 2009. The set featured Angelina Love, Awesome Kong, Christy Hemme, Dixie Carter, The Governor, Jacqueline, Jenna Morasca, Lauren, Madison Rayne, ODB, Raisha Saeed, Rhaka Khan, Roxxi, Sharmell, SoCal Val, Sojournor Bolt, Traci Brooks, Taylor Wilde, and Velvet Sky. Also included are cards pairing the Knockouts with male TNA wrestlers.

=== Playboy ===
Shortly before leaving Impact Wrestling, backstage interviewer Leticia Cline appeared on the cover of the November/December 2007 issue of Playboy's Sexy Girls Next Door, which included her nude photo shoot.

In an interview with The Sun, Traci Brooks confirmed that Playboy magazine (which previously had a partnership agreement with WWE prior to the organization converting to PG-rated television content) reached a new partnership agreement with Impact Wrestling. Brooks was originally scheduled to be featured in the November 2009 issue including becoming the first Impact Wrestling Knockout to appear in Playboy. However, Playboy decided not to publish Brooks' photo shoot in their magazine. The photo shoot was instead released online through their Cyber Club website on September 17, 2009.

=== Other ===
==== Publications ====
Beautiful People members Angelina Love and Velvet Sky were featured on the cover and in a pictorial in the December 2009 issue of Muscle & Fitness magazine, which also included photos of Lauren Brooke and SoCal Val. Velvet Sky was named "Woman of the Year" by Modelsmania magazine after featuring on the cover and in a pictorial in the August 2013 issue of the publication. Earlier that year Sky was reunited with former teammate Angelina Love when they featured together on the cover and in a pictorial in the January/February 2013 issue of Modelsmania magazine.

==== Media ====
In 2009, Taylor Wilde and The Beautiful People (Angelina Love and Velvet Sky) appeared in the American reality show MTV Made to compete in a match involving a teen trained by A.J. Styles.

Some of the current and former Impact Knockouts have had short television and movie careers outside of Impact Wrestling. Former backstage interviewer Lauren Brooke hosts Top Ten and Destination Golf on the Golf Channel. SoCal Val appeared in a television commercial for Morphoplex. Christy Hemme had roles in Bloodstained Memoirs, Fallen Angels, and Bubba's Chili Parlor. Hemme has also pursued a singing career and released songs on MySpace and iTunes. Traci Brooks had a role in Zombie Beach Party. Alissa Flash has a role in the 2010 documentary False Finish. Former backstage interviewer Leticia Cline appeared in the fifth season of the reality series Beauty and the Geek in 2008, as well as the Howard Stern reality series Bowling Beauties. Angelina Love had a role in the 2008 indie film titled Good Intentions starring country music star LeAnn Rimes and Luke Perry. In 2012, Tara appeared in the American reality show MTV Made coaching an aspiring teen trying to be a professional wrestler while Brooke Tessmacher and Velvet Sky also former Knockout Angelina Love appeared in the episode. In June 2012, Velvet Sky had the lead role in Montgomery Gentry's music video for their song "So Called Life". In July 2012, Mickie James featured in Bucky Covington's music video for his song "Drinking Side of Country". In June 2013, Mickie James starred in a Dr Pepper advert, which was part of the company's new advertising program. It featured "one of a kind" individuals talking about the role of Dr Pepper in their lives.

== Championships and accomplishments ==
=== Current champions ===
The following list shows the Knockouts that are currently holding all active singles and tag team championships in TNA Wrestling.

Singles

Championship	Current champion	Reign	Date won	Days held	Location	Notes	Ref.
TNA Knockouts World Championship	Indi Hartwell	1	October 11, 2026	34	Tampa, Florida	Defeated Xia Brookside at Bound for Glory.	
TNA Knockouts Television Championship	M by Elegance	1	August 27, 2026	79	Brampton, Ontario, Canada	Defeated Jada Stone in the tournament final on Thursday Night Impact! to become the inaugural champion.	

Tag team

Championship	Current champions	Reign	Date won	Days held	Location	Notes	Ref.
TNA Knockouts World Tag Team Championship	Apex (Zoey Serrano and Shayna Baszler)	1	October 11, 2026	34	Tampa, Florida	Defeated Allie and Kiera Hogan at Bound for Glory.	

=== Past and retired championships ===
Championship	Champion	Reign	Date won	Date retired	Location	Notes
Miss TNA Crown Championship	April Pennington	1	2002	2002	Nashville, Tennessee	Title was abandoned after it was given to April by Bruce.
NWA World Women's Championship	Leilani Kai	1	March 12, 2003	The title is still active but was only active in TNA from March 12, 2003, to June 19, 2004.	Nashville, Tennessee	Defeated Madison for the title on March 12, 2003, on NWA:TNA Weekly PPV #36 of year 2003.
GFW Women's Championship	Sienna	1	April 21, 2017	July 2, 2017	Orlando, Florida	Defeated the inaugural champion Christina Von Eerie. The title was unified with the Impact Knockouts Championship at Slammiversary XV, in which Sienna defeated Rosemary.

=== Hall of Famers ===
Wrestler	Year inducted	Notes
Gail Kim	2016	Gail became the first woman / knockout to be inducted into the TNA Hall of Fame.
Awesome Kong	2021	Kong became the second woman and the first black woman to be inducted into the Impact Hall of Fame.
Traci Brooks	2023	
Mickie James	2025	
The Beautiful People (Angelina Love & Velvet Sky)	2025	Became the first female tag team duo to get inducted into the TNA Hall of Fame.
ODB	2026	

=== Miss TNA ===
The first Miss TNA was crowned on June 26, 2002, when Taylor Vaughn won a 9-woman lingerie battle royal. The title was abandoned in November 2002.

Wrestler:	Reigns:	Date:	Place:	Notes:
Taylor Vaughn	1	June 26, 2002	Huntsville, AL	Defeats Alexis Laree, Elektra, Erin Bray, Francine, Miss Joni, Sasha, Shannon, and Teresa Tyler in a "Lingerie Battle Royal"
Bruce	1	July 31, 2002	Nashville, TN	
April Pennington	1	November 27, 2002	Nashville, TN	Pennington was given the crown by Bruce and the title was immediately abandoned
Title Abandoned		November 27, 2002		

=== Impact Wrestling's Knockouts Year–End Awards ===
The Impact Wrestling Knockout of the Year Award formally known as the TNA Wrestling's Babe/Knockout of the Year contest is a contest where fans vote on Impact Wrestling's official website for who their favorite Impact Knockout for that year, the winners were announced during the Year End Awards on iMPACT!. The award was established in 2003 and ended in 2007. The award was reestablished in 2018.

Year Won	Award	Wrestler
2003	Babe of the Year	Trinity
2004	Babe of the Year	Traci Brooks
2005	Knockout of the Year	Jackie Gayda
2006	Knockout of the Year	Christy Hemme
2007	Knockout of the Year	Gail Kim
2014	Knockout of the Year	Taryn Terrell
2018	Knockout of the Year	Tessa Blanchard
2019	Knockout of the Year	Taya Valkyrie
2020	Knockout of the Year	Deonna Purrazzo
2021	Knockout of the Year	Deonna Purrazzo
2022	Knockout of the Year	Jordynne Grace
2023	Knockout of the Year	Trinity
2024	Knockout of the Year	Jordynne Grace
2021	Knockouts Tag Team of the Year	Jordynne Grace and Rachael Ellering
2022	Knockouts Tag Team of the Year	The Death Dollz; Jessicka, Rosemary and Taya Valkyrie
2023	Knockouts Tag Team of the Year	MK Ultra; Killer Kelly and Masha Slamovich
2019	Wrestler of the Year	Tessa Blanchard
2020	Wrestler of the Year	Deonna Purrazzo

=== Queen of the Knockouts (2013–2016) ===
TNA held a series of matches featuring various Knockouts at TNA One Night Only: Knockout Knockdown. The winners of these matches would advance to a battle royal, with the winner being crowned the "Queen of the Knockouts". It took place on March 17, 2013, from the Impact Wrestling Zone in Orlando, Florida and aired on PPV on September 6, 2013. No queen was crowned in 2017.

No.	Results	Event, Date and Location
I	Gail Kim defeated Hannah Blossom, Jackie Moore, Lei'D Tapa, Mickie James, Velvet Sky, Miss Tessmacher, ODB, and Tara	Knockouts Knockdown; March 17, 2013, Orlando, Florida
II	Madison Rayne defeated Angelina Love, Gail Kim, Brooke Tessmacher, Marti Bell, Taryn Terrell, Reby Sky, and Mia Yim	Knockouts Knockdown 2 May 10, 2014; Orlando, Florida
III	Awesome Kong defeated Thea Trinidad, Gail Kim, Havok, Taryn Terrell, Brooke Tessmacher, and Madison Rayne	Knockouts Knockdown 3 February 14, 2015; Orlando, Florida
IIII	Jade defeated Madison Rayne, Allysin Kay, Laura Dennis, Rosemary, Barbi Hayden, Marti Bell, and Rebel	Knockouts Knockdown 4 March 17, 2016; Orlando, Florida

=== Queen of the Cage ===
The Queen of the Cage match was a professional wrestling match exclusive to TNA. The match was determined annually at the Lockdown pay-per-view event. In 2008, the match began as a reverse-battle royal involving eight wrestlers. The first two wrestlers that entered the cage then competed in a one-on-one match that was won via pin fall or submission. The winner became the number one contender for the TNA Women's Knockout Championship. In 2009, the match was a traditional four-way match. The match type has since been dropped.

No.	Match	Event, Date and Location
I	Roxxi Laveaux defeated Angelina Love, Christy Hemme, Jacqueline, Rhaka Khan, Salinas, Traci Brooks, and Velvet Sky	Lockdown 2008; April 13, 2008, Lowell, Massachusetts
II	ODB defeated Daffney, Madison Rayne, and Sojournor Bolt	Lockdown 2009; April 19, 2009, Philadelphia, Pennsylvania

== TNA Knockouts Tournaments ==
=== New Year's Knockout Eve Tournament (2009) ===
The New Year's Knockout Eve Tournament took place on the December 31, 2009, edition of Impact!. The winner of the tournament would earn herself a shot at the TNA Women's Knockout Championship on the live three hour Monday night edition of Impact! on January 4, 2010.

Quarterfinals
Madison Rayne	Pin
Hamada	04:25
Velvet Sky	Pin
Roxxi	02:13
Traci Brooks	Pin
ODB	04:16
Daffney	Pin
Awesome Kong	03:30

Semifinals
Hamada	Pin
Roxxi	07:49
ODB	Pin
Awesome Kong	09:41

Final
Hamada	Pin
ODB	14:34

=== TNA Knockouts Tag Team Championship Tournament (2009) ===
TNA announced a Knockouts tag team tournament for the new TNA Knockouts Tag Team Championship on the August 20, 2009, episode of TNA Impact!. Round one matches started on the August 27, 2009, episode of TNA Impact!.

Round One (TNA Impact!)
Awesome Kong and Raisha Saeed	Pin
Traci Brooks and Sharmell	03:00
Sarita and Taylor Wilde	Pin
Daffney and Alissa Flash	05:00
Angelina Love and Velvet Sky	Pin
Madison Rayne and Roxxi	03:00
Hamada and Sojo Bolt	N/A
Tara and Christy Hemme	Pin

Round Two (TNA Impact!)
Awesome Kong and Raisha Saeed	03:00
Sarita and Taylor Wilde	Pin
Angelina Love and Velvet Sky	Pin
Tara and Christy Hemme	04:00

Finals (No Surrender)
Sarita and Taylor Wilde	Pin
Madison Rayne and Velvet Sky	05:00

=== TNA Knockouts Tag Team Championship Tournament (2010) ===
On the December 9, 2010, edition of Impact! TNA vacated the TNA Knockouts Tag Team Championship, after one half of the previous champions, Hamada, had been released by the promotion, and set up a four–team tournament to determine new champions. The finals of the tournament would take place on the December 23 edition of Impact!.

Semifinals; TNA Impact! (December 6 and 7, 2010)
The Beautiful People (Angelina Love and Velvet Sky)	Pin
Daffney and Sarita	04:00
Madison Rayne and Tara	Pin
Mickie James and Miss Tessmacher	04:00

Finals; TNA Impact! (December 9, 2010)
Angelina Love and Winter*	Pin
Madison Rayne and Tara	05:00

* Winter replaced Velvet Sky, who had been attacked backstage by Sarita.

=== Impact Knockouts Championship Tournament (2017) ===
On November 23, 2017, it was announced after Gail Kim retired and vacated the Impact Knockouts Championship that it would be a 6-Women tournament to determine who would be the new Knockouts Champion where two triple threat matches will happen and one finals.

Semifinals
Laurel Van Ness	Pin
Madison Rayne & KC Spinelli	N/A
Sienna & Allie	N/A
Rosemary	Pin

Finals
Laurel Van Ness	Pin
Rosemary	N/A

=== Impact Knockouts Tag Team Revival Championship Tournament (2020-2021) ===
Over the course of 2020, Impact Wrestling (which had been renamed from TNA in 2017) signed several female talents such as Nevaeh, Tasha Steelz, Deonna Purrazzo, and Kimber Lee, all of which were paired with already established names on the roster. After months of competition between the tag teams in the Knockouts division, on October 24 at the Bound for Glory pay-per-view, Madison Rayne announced that after nearly eight years of inactivity, Impact Wrestling is reviving the Knockouts Tag Team Championship. It was also announced that an eight-team tournament would take place over the next two months to determine the next champions. The brackets were announced in November, with the final taking place at the Hard To Kill pay-per-view in January 2021. At Hard To Kill, Fire 'N Flava (Kiera Hogan and Tasha Steelz) defeated Havok and Nevaeh in the tournament final to win the revived titles.

Round One; Impact! (November 17 & 24, December 1 & 8, 2020)
Tenille Dashwood and Alisha	6:32
Havok and Nevaeh
Killer Kelly and Renee Michelle	8:54
Jazz and Jordynne Grace	Pin
Fire 'N Flava (Kiera Hogan and Tasha Steelz)	Pin
Team Sea Stars (Ashley Vox and Delmi Exo)	7:10
Deonna Purrazzo and Kimber Lee	06:59
Taya Valkyrie and Rosemary	Pin

Round Two; Impact! (December 15, 2020 & January 5, 2021)
Havok and Nevaeh	Pin
Jazz and Jordynne Grace	08:48
Fire 'N Flava	Pin
Taya Valkyrie and Rosemary	07:58

Finals; Hard to Kill (January 16, 2021)
Havok and Nevaeh	09:40
Fire 'N Flava	Pin

=== 2021 Homecoming Tournament ===
This was a mixed tag team tournament which was the focus of Homecoming event on July 30, 2021, to crown the Homecoming King and Queen.

First round
Swinger's Palace (Hernandez and Alisha Edwards)	Pin
Matthew Rehwoldt and Deonna Purrazzo
The Pump Family (Petey Williams and Jordynne Grace)	Pin
Matt Cardona and Chelsea Green
Decay (Crazzy Steve and Rosemary)
Fallah 'N Flava (Fallah Bahh and Tasha Steelz)	Pin
The Road Warriors (Tommy Dreamer and Rachael Ellering)
Brian Myers and Missy Hyatt	Pin

Semi-finals
Matthew Rehwoldt and Deonna Purrazzo
Matt Cardona and Chelsea Green	Pin
Decay (Crazzy Steve and Rosemary)
The Road Warriors (Tommy Dreamer and Rachael Ellering)	Pin

Final
Matthew Rehwoldt and Deonna Purrazzo
Decay (Crazzy Steve and Rosemary)	Pin

=== Knockouts Knockdown Tournament (2021) ===
On the September 23 episode of Impact!, producer Gail Kim announced an eight-woman, one night tournament for the Knockouts Knockdown event, where the winner will earn a future shot at the Impact Knockouts Championship.

Quarter-finals; Knockouts Knockdown (October 9, 2021)
Tasha Steelz	Pin
Jamie Senegal	11:04
Chelsea Green	Pin
Renee Michelle	8:28
Rachael Ellering	Pin
Lady Frost	11:54
Brandi Lauren	2:09
Mercedes Martinez	Pin

Semi-finals; Knockouts Knockdown (October 9, 2021)
Tasha Steelz	Pin
Chelsea Green	12:23
Rachael Ellering	12:30
Mercedes Martinez	Sub

Final; Knockouts Knockdown (October 9, 2021)
Tasha Steelz	10:58
Mercedes Martinez	Pin

== Gut Check Winners ==
TNA Gut Check (formally known as Impact Gut Check) is a reality series that was established in 2004 where both male and female Indy Stars are contestants and compete for an Impact contract. The following list shows only the female Gut Check winners only and the years that they've won.

Year Won	Contestant Winners
2004	Jaime Dauncey (aka Sirelda)
2012	Taeler Hendrix
2013	Lei'D Tapa
2023	Harley Hudson

== Pro Wrestling Illustrated ==
=== PWI Female 50 / Women's 100 / Women's 150 / Women's 250 ===
Year	1	2	3	4	5	6	7	8	9	10
PWI Female 50
2008	Awesome Kong	-	Gail Kim	-	-	-	Roxxi Laveaux	-	-	-
2009	-	Angelina Love	-	-	Tara	Awesome Kong	-	-	-	Taylor Wilde
2010	-	Angelina Love	-	-	-	Madison Rayne	-	-	-	-
2011	-	-	Mickie James	-	Madison Rayne	-	-	-	Tara	-
2012	Gail Kim	-	-	-	-	-	Miss Tessmacher	-	-	Tara
2013	-	Mickie James	-	-	-	Gail Kim	-	Tara	-	-
2014	-	-	-	Gail Kim	-	-	Angelina Love	-	-	-
2015	-	-	-	-	Gail Kim	-	-	-	-	Taryn Terrell
2016	-	-	-	-	-	Jade	-	Gail Kim	-	Sienna
2017	-	-	-	-	-	-	-	Sienna	-	-
PWI Women's 100
2019	-	-	-	-	Tessa Blanchard	-	-	-	-	-
2020	-	-	-	-	-	-	Tessa Blanchard	-	-	-
PWI Women's 150
2021	-	-	Deonna Purrazzo	-	-	-	-	-	-	-
2022	-	-	-	-	-	Jordynne Grace	-	-	-	Taya Valkyrie
PWI Women's 250
2023	-	-	-	-	-	-	Deonna Purrazzo	-	-	Jordynne Grace
2024	-	Jordynne Grace	-	-	-	-	-	-	-	-

=== PWI Year–End Awards ===
Year Won	Award	Wrestler
2008	Women of the Year	Awesome Kong
2011	Women of the Year	Mickie James
2011	Inspirational Wrestler of the Year	Rosita
2022	Comeback of the Year	Taya Valkyrie

== Sports Illustrated ==
=== Women's Wrestler of the Year ===
Year	1	2	3	4	5	6	7	8	9	10
2018	-	-	Tessa Blanchard	-	-	-	-	-	-	Jordynne Grace
2019	-	Tessa Blanchard	-	-	Taya Valkyrie	-	-	-	Jordynne Grace	-

=== Wrestler of the Year ===
Year	1	2	3	4	5	6	7	8	9	10
2017	-	-	-	-	-	-	-	-	-	-
2020	-	-	-	-	-	-	-	-	-	-
2021	-	-	-	-	-	-	-	-	-	-
2022	-	-	-	-	-	-	-	-	-	Masha Slamovich
2023	-	-	-	Trinity	-	-	-	-	-	-

== Inaugural championship holders ==
Championships	Knockout(s) (KO(s))	Company	Year(s)
Miss TNA Crown Championship	Taylor Vaughn	National Wrestling Alliance (NWA); Total Nonstop Action (TNA)	2002–2002
NWA World Women's Championship	Mildred Burke	National Wrestling Alliance (NWA); Total Nonstop Action (TNA)	2003–2004
TNA Knockouts World Championship	Gail Kim	Total Nonstop Action Wrestling (TNA); Global Force Wrestling (GFW); Impact Wrestling	2007–present
TNA Knockouts World Tag Team Championship	Sarita & Taylor Wilde	Total Nonstop Action Wrestling (TNA); Impact Wrestling	2009–2013; 2020–present
GFW Women's Championship	Christina Von Eerie	Global Force Wrestling (GFW) & Impact Wrestling unified	2015–2017
Impact Digital Media Championship	Jordynne Grace	Impact Wrestling	2021–2025
TNA Knockouts Television Championship	M by Elegance	Total Nonstop Action Wrestling (TNA)	2026–present

== Sponsorships ==
Knockout clothing and merchandise is available to purchase online, if wanting to purchase.

== Current Knockouts (Women's) division ==
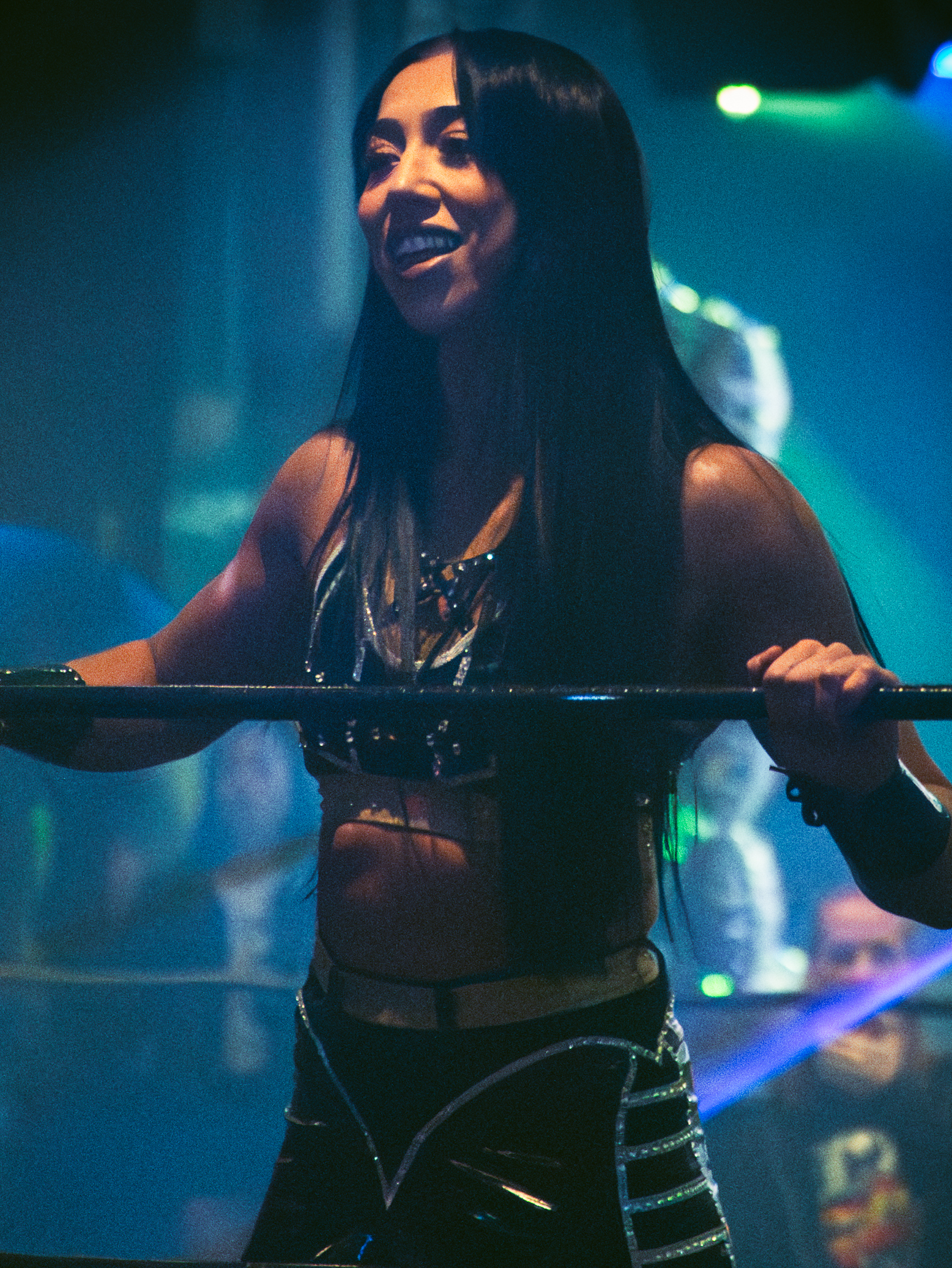
Indi Hartwell

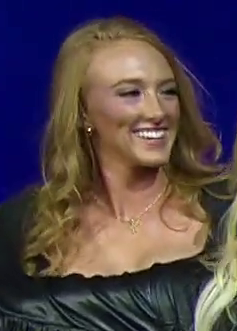
M by Elegance

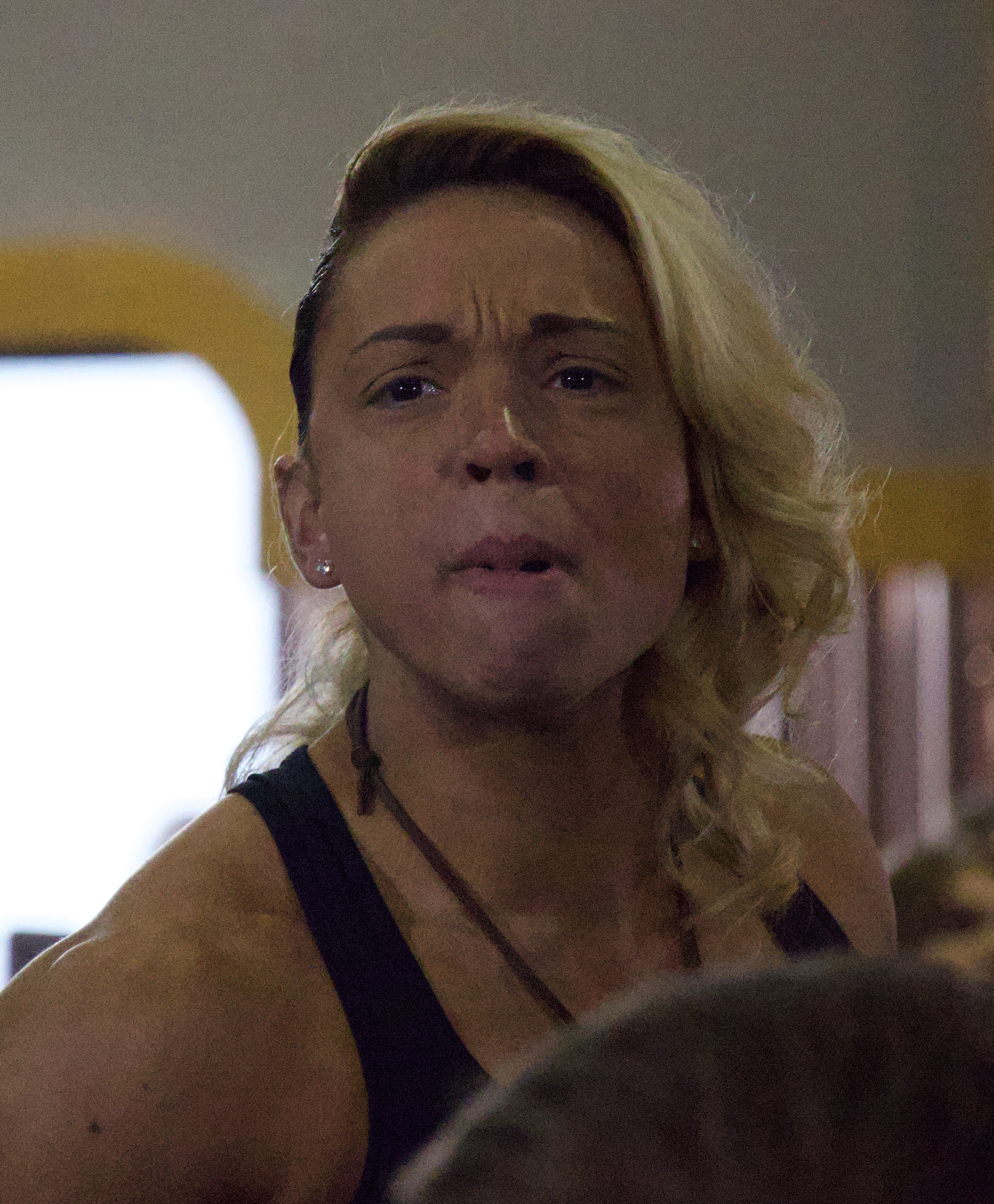
Zoey Serrano

Shayna Baszler

Ring name	Real name	Notes
Alisha Edwards	Alisha Maher	Marketing Coordinator
Allie	Laura Dennis	
Ash by Elegance	Ashley Sebera	
Elayna Black	Brianna Coda	
Gabby Forza	Undisclosed	
Harley Hudson	Lilli Pruden	
Heather by Elegance	Jaime Chambers	
Indi Hartwell	Samantha De Martin	Knockouts World Champion
Jada Stone	Savannah Foxworth	
Kiera Hogan	Kiera Hogan	
M by Elegance	Maggie Peters	Knockouts Television Champion; AAW Women's Champion
Mila Moore	Kellie Morga	
Shayna Baszler	Shayna Baszler	Knockouts World Tag Team Champion
Shotzi Blackheart	Ashley Alfaro	
Taryn Terrell	Taryn Dryden	
Tasha Steelz	Latasha Harris	
Xia Brookside	Xia-Louise Brooks	
Zoey Serrano	Theresa Serrano	Knockouts World Tag Team Champion
