= Chaparita Asari =

Japanese professional wrestler (born 1973)

Personal information
- Born: Masami Watanabe; September 15, 1973 (age 53) Arakawa, Tokyo, Japan
- Education: Japan Women's College of Physical Education
- Spouse: Kazuki Nakao (m. 2006; div. 2023)
- Children: 2

Professional wrestling career
- Ring names: Chaparita Asari; Chapa Asari; Top of the Superlight
- Billed height: 5 ft 0 in (152 cm)
- Billed weight: 123 lb (56 kg)
- Trained by: AJW Dojo
- Debut: November 19, 1992
- Retired: May 5, 2003

Masami Watanabe (わたなべ まさみみ, Watanabe Masami; born September 15, 1973) is a Japanese retired professional wrestler. Also known by her ring name, Chaparita Asari (チャパリータ ASARI; Chaparita ASARI), she wrestled from 1992 to 2003 in various Japanese promotions namely AJW, NEO Japan Pro Wrestling, ARSION, Michinoku Pro Wrestling, and also a few matches in the American wrestling promotion, WWF. In that tenure, she won WWWA Super Lightweight championship four times, AJW Junior Championship two times and the AJW Tag Team Championship one-time. Her signature finishing move is the Sky Twister Press, which she innovated.

== Early life ==
Born on September 15, 1973, in Tokyo, Asari graduated from Nikaido High School of Japan Women's College of Physical Education where she was a member of its gymnastics club.

== Career ==
In early 90s during the selection process in women's professional wrestling in Japan, Asari's application was rejected twice as she fell short of the minimum 160 cm (5 ft 3 in) height criteria while she was only 152 cm (5 ft 0 in) tall. In her next application, she changed her height to the minimum threshold and got accepted for next round in the process. Her signature wrestling move, Sky Twister Press and a display of other moves such as Corkscrew Moonsault had impressed the Dojo judges; and she passed the audition to join AJW in 1992.

On November 19, 1992, in AJW, Asari made her in–ring wrestling debut against Yuka Shiina in Katsushika, Tokyo. Following the match, she changed her in-ring name from Mama Watanabe to Chaparita Asari as she had been motivated by her selection despite not fulfilling the height criteria in her application. Later on March 26, 1995, in Kangawa, she won her first professional wrestling title in the match against Candy Okutsu to become AJW Junior champion. In the same year, she became a two-time AJW Junior champion by defending her title against Nobue Endo. On September 2, 1995, she won the AJW tag team championship with her tag team partner, Kumiko Maesawa. Two years later on May 18, 1996, she won her first wrestling championship in the promotion by defeating Toshie Uematsu for the WWWA Super Lightweight title. She held the Super Lightweight title for a cumulative total of 1,325 days and had won it for the fourth time before vacating the title to Ai Fujita. She left the promotion in 1997 following the win against her debut opponent, Yuka Shiina on July 21, 1997.

While actively wrestling in AJW, Asari joined Michinoku Pro Wrestling (MPW) in 1994 where she became an active participant in 1997 and in the same year had founded her own women's club in MPW. In 1997, she also wrestled in CMLL for the world women's championship only to lose in the tournament's final match against Lady Apache.

Asari had a brief stint in WWF which consisted of two matches—a debut 4 on 4 elimination match in Survivor Series 1995 and a following match on Monday Night RAW against Aja Kong, both of which she lost.

After leaving AJW in 1997, Asari joined NEO Japan Ladies Pro-Wrestling (NEO) where she debuted in the promotion's debut event on January 9, 1998, in a singles match winning it against Yoshiko Tamura. Later on the same day with Kyoko Inoue, NEO founder and Tamura as her tag team partners, she wrestled in a tag team match which they lost.

In late July 1999, Asari became inactive in NEO and went to Hyper Visual Fighting Arsion (ARSION) where she won the Sky High Tournament and later the Sky High of ARSION league to become the first Sky High of ARSION champion on September 23, 1999, after defeating Ayako Hamada. She held the title for 174 days before losing it to Mari Apache.

On May 5, 2003, Asari wrestled her final match at a NEO Mania event titled "Chaparita Asari's retirement show" in which she had defeated Kyoko Inoue in a singles match. This marked the end of her 11 year long career.

== Other media ==
Asari appeared as a character in these video games—Fire Pro Joshi: All-Star Dream Slam (1994), Super Fire Pro Wrestling: Queen's Special (1995) and All Japan Women's Pro Wrestling: Queen Legend Dream Battle (1998).

The Indian TV series Shaktimaan with its protagonist, Mukesh Khanna received criticism for allegedly copying Asari's red and gold outfit which she wore in the WWF singles match against Aja Kong.

== Championships and accomplishments ==
- All Japan Women's Pro Wrestling
  - AJW Junior Championship (2 times)
  - AJW Tag Team Championship (1 time) – with Kumiko Maekawa
  - WWWA Super Lightweight Championship (4 times)
- Hyper Visual Fighting Arsion
  - Sky High of Arsion Championship (1 time)
- NEO Japan Ladies Pro-Wrestling
  - NEO Hall of Fame (2005)

== See also ==
- Joshi puroresu
