= Sky High of Arsion Championship =

Professional wrestling women's championship

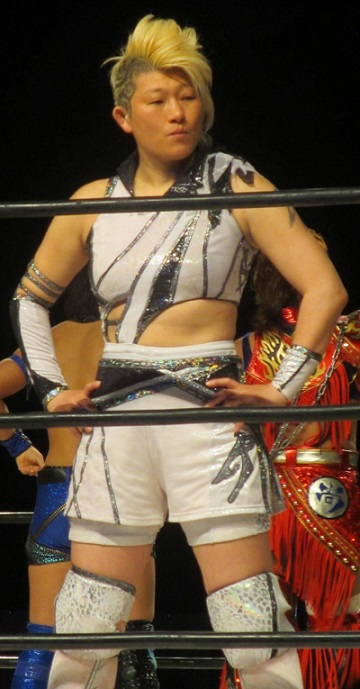
- Akino, who held the Sky High of Arsion Championship twice

Details
- Promotion: Hyper Visual Fighting Arsion
- Date established: September 23, 1999
- Date retired: June 22, 2003
Statistics
- First champion: Chaparita Asari
- Final champion: Akino
- Most reigns: Akino (2 reigns)
- Longest reign: Akino (2nd reign, 490 days)
- Shortest reign: Ayako Hamada (89 days)
- Oldest champion: Akino (28 years, 116 days)
- Youngest champion: Ayako Hamada (19 years, 180 days)
- Heaviest champion: Faby Apache (63 kg (139 lb))
- Lightest champion: Chaparita Asari (53 kg (117 lb))

The Sky High of Arsion Championship (Japanese: スカイ・ハイ・オブ・アルシオン王座, Hepburn: Sukai Hai Obu Arushion Ōz) was a women's professional wrestling championship owned by the Hyper Visual Fighting Arsion promotion. Like most professional wrestling championships, the title was won as a result of a scripted match. The championship, which was meant for high-flying wrestlers, was introduced on September 23, 1999, when Chaparita ASARI defeated Ayako Hamada in the finals of a tournament to become the inaugural champion. During the next four years, there were six reigns shared among five different wrestlers. The title was retired when Arsion went out of business on June 22, 2003, making Akino the final champion in the title's history. The title belt was later awarded as a trophy to Dark Angel, after she defeated Princesa Sujei at an Estrella★Japan event on April 5, 2010.

== History ==
On September 23, 1999, Chaparita Asari became the first champion in the title's history by defeating Ayako Hamada in the finals of a seven-woman round-robin tournament. On August 12, 2000, Hamada won the championship, however, the title was vacated on November 9 for undocumented reasons. Akino won the vacant championship on December 3. In August 2001, Akino vacated the title where she supposedly left Arison, only to return under a mask as noki-A. Faby Apache defeated her on October 27 to win the vacant championship in the finals of an eight-woman single-elimination tournament. On February 17, 2002, Akino won the title for the second time, where she held it until June 22, 2003, Upon Arison's closing.

== Reigns ==
Over the championship's three-year history, there have been six reigns between five champions and two vacancies. Chaparita Asari was the inaugural champion. Akino holds the record for most reign at two, while also being the last champion over its history. Akino's second reign is the longest at 490 days, while Hamada's is the shortest at 89 days. Akino is the oldest champion at 28 years old, while Hamada is the youngest at 19 years old.

Key
No.	Overall reign number
Reign	Reign number for the specific champion
Days	Number of days held
Defenses	Number of successful defenses

No.	Champion	Championship change			Reign statistics			Notes	Ref.
No.	Champion	Date	Event	Location	Reign	Days	Defenses	Notes	Ref.
1	Chaparita ASARI	September 23, 1999	Live event	Kobe, Hyōgo, Japan	1	174	3	Defeated Ayako Hamada in the finals of a seven-woman round-robin tournament to become the inaugural champion.	
2	Mari Apache	March 15, 2000	Live event	Tokyo, Japan	1	150	2		
3	Ayako Hamada	August 12, 2000	Live event	Nagoya, Aichi, Japan	1	89	3		
—	Vacated	November 9, 2000	—	—	—	—	—	The championship was vacated for undocumented reasons.	
4	Akino	December 3, 2000	Live event	Tokyo, Japan	1	(Note: The exact date on which Akino vacated the championship is unknown, which means that the title reign lasted between 241 and 271 days.)	4	Defeated Chaparita Asari to win the vacant championship.	
—	Vacated	August 2001	—	—	—	—	—	Akino vacated the championship, when she supposedly left Arsion, only to return under a mask as noki-A.	
5	Faby Apache	October 27, 2001	N/A	Osaka, Japan	1	113	2	Defeated noki-A in the finals of an eight-woman single-elimination tournament to win the vacant championship.	
6	Akino	February 17, 2002	Arsion 4th Anniversary	Tokyo, Japan	2	490	5		
—	Deactivated	June 22, 2003	—	—	—	—	—	The championship was retired, when Arsion goes out of business.	

== Combined reigns ==
¤	The exact length of a title reign is uncertain; the combined length may not be correct.

Rank	Wrestler	No. of reigns	Combined defenses	Combined days
1	Akino	2	9	731–761¤
2	Chaparita Asari	1	3	174
3	Mari Apache	1	2	150
4	Faby Apache	1	2	113
5	Ayako Hamada	1	3	89

== See also ==
- High Speed Championship
