= Faby Apache =

Mexican Luchadora, or female wrestler (born 1980)

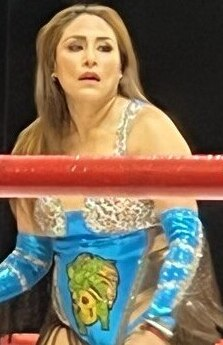
- Faby Apache in 2025

Personal information
- Born: Fabiola Balbuena Torres; 26 December 1980 (age 45) Mexico City, Mexico
- Spouse: Billy Boy (ex-husband)
- Children: 1
- Parent: Gran Apache (father)
- Relatives: Mari Apache (sister); Lady Apache (step mother); Natsumi (niece)

Professional wrestling career
- Ring name(s): Faby Apache; Fabi Apache
- Billed height: 1.60 m (5 ft 3 in)
- Billed weight: 63 kg (139 lb)
- Trained by: Gran Apache; Aja Kong; Mariko Yoshida
- Debut: 14 December 1998

Fabiola Balbuena Torres (born 26 December 1980) is a Mexican professional wrestler. She currently signed with WWE appearing in their sister company Lucha Libre AAA Worldwide (AAA) where she performs as Faby Apache (sometimes written as "Fabi Apache").

Between 2005 and 2009, she was involved in a long running storyline that revolved around her relationship with Billy Boy, her real-life husband, as well as her father Gran Apache, sister Mari Apache and even saw Billy Boy and Faby Apache's son Marvin play a part in it. She won the 2008 Reina de Reinas tournament and has held the AAA World Mixed Tag Team Championship four times.

== Life and career ==
=== Training and Japanese promotions (1998–1999) ===
After finishing high school, Balbuena asked her father Gran Apache for wrestling training, which he accepted. Balbuena made her debut in 1998 under the name "Lady Venom", a masked character. Early in her career she travelled to Japan to wrestle, as well as receive further training by Aja Kong and Mariko Yoshida. In Japan she wrestled for the Arsion promotion, where she won the Sky High of Arsion Championship.

=== Lucha Libre AAA Worldwide (1999–2022 appearing WWE 2025-present) ===
After she returned to Mexico in 1999, she became a regular worker for AAA, achieving a measure of in-ring success by winning Lucha de Apuesta, hair vs. hair matches against La Hechicera as well as male wrestler May Flowers.

In 2005 Faby Apache became involved in the storyline that, more than any other, would define her professional wrestling career. Billy Boy began showing up ringside during Faby's matches with flowers and signs profession his love. The two had dated for years in real life and had recently married when the storyline began, writing their real-life relationship into a storyline. The friction began when Faby Apache's father, Gran Apache, objected to the relationship and attacked Billy Boy as he was not "worthy" of his daughter. The storyline played out over several years and even had the birth of Billy Boy and Faby's son Marvin written into the storyline. At one point Gran Apache defeated Billy Boy, forcing him to not have anything to do with either Faby Apache or his son Marvin. Following the loss, the storyline was that Billy Boy was so depressed that he caused Los Barrio Boys to lose several matches, this in turn led to Alan and Decnnis turning on Billy Boy, siding with Gran Apache in the storyline. Soon after the storyline saw Billy Boy committed to a mental institution. On May 28, 2008, Faby Apache defeated Ayako Hamada and Mari Apache to win the 2008 Reina de Reinas tournament. Following Faby's win the Reina de Reinas trophy was turned into a regular wrestling championship represented by a title belt, instead of the annual tournament it had been between 1999 and 2008. During 2008 she started a feud with her older sister Mari Apache, due to tension from the Billy Boy storyline. On June 13, 2008, at Triplemanía XVI Faby Apache defeated her sister in a Lucha de Apuesta, hair vs. hair match. Following the match Gran Apache came to the ring and pleaded with Faby, persuading her to not shave Mari's hair off but instead shave his hair. The sacrifice by Gran Apache brought the family back together again.

Billy Boy would later return to AAA as Alfa, wearing a mask and keeping his true identity secret. As Alfa he gained Gran Apache's respect, leading Apache to stating that Alfa would make a good husband for Faby Apache. Following the statement Billy Boy unmasked to the surprise of everyone, reuniting with Faby Apache and Marvin, though the ruse did not please Gran Apache. During AAA's 2008 Guerra de Titanes show Billy Boy came to Faby Apache's aid after she lost a match, this in turn led to Faby Apache slapping Billy Boy, causing Billy Boy to attack her, turning Rudo (bad guy) for the first time in his career. During an in-ring celebration of Gran Apache's 50 years in professional wrestling Billy Boy attacked his father-in-law with a steel chair, injuring Apache's knee so he had to be taken from the ring on a stretcher. This turn of events was written into the storyline due to Gran Apache actually suffering a knee injury and this was used as a way to explain why he was not able to wrestle. In the spring of 2010 Aero Star was written into the storyline as a new love interest for Faby Apache, Initially Billy Boy acted like he did not care as he himself had found a new love in Sexi Star. During a television taping on March 21, 2010, Aero Star came to the ring and asked Gran Apache's permission to ask Faby Apache out, which led to Billy Boy storming to the ring and attacking Aero Star. The storyline evolved and saw all four involved in an inter-gender Lucha de Apueta Steel Cage Match where the last person in the ring would either have their hair shaved off or be forced to unmask. The match came down to Faby Apache and Billy Boy in the cage with Faby Apache pinning Billy. Following the Apuesta loss the storyline has focused more on Faby Apache and Sexi Star than Billy Boy. Following the Apuesta loss the storyline began to focus more on the rivalry between Faby Apache and Sexy Star and less on Billy Boy. The two faced off in a "Bull Terrier" match for Faby Apache's AAA Reina de Reinas Championship during AAA's Heroes Inmortales III event, in which Sexy Star defeated Faby Apache due to the interference of La Legión Extranjera members Jennifer Blade and Rain. In the time following the title victory Sexy Star became a member of La Legión, making her the only Mexican female in the group. The storyline between Sexy Star and Faby Apache continued at the 2009 Guerra de Titanes where Sexy Star defeated Faby Apache in a Lucha de Apuesta match, in no small part thanks to the interference of La Legión. Following the match Faby's father came to the ring and cut some of Faby's hair off, although he did not shave it all off as is tradition in Apuestas matches. On the same night, at Guerra de Titanes, Cinthia Moreno returned to AAA, siding with Faby Apache in her fight against La Legión. This meant that Moreno, Faby and her sister Mari Apache faced off against Sexy Star, Rain and Christina Von Eerie during the 2010 Rey de Reyes event, a match which Moreno won for her team by pinning Sexy Star. During a post Rey de Reyes interview Sexy Star claimed that the Apaches and Cintia Moreno were nothing but maids, which led to AAA booking a match between Cinthia Moreno, Faby and Mari Apache against Sexy Star, Rain and Jennifer Blade in a match at Triplemanía XVIII where the person pinned or submitted would have to be the winning team's slave for a month. At Triplemanía La Legión defeated Moreno and the Apaches, when Blade pinned Mari, thanks in part to the biased refereering by Hijo del Tirantes. Following the match Konnan ordered Mari Apache to begin her maid duty right away by cleaning up their dressing room. The stipulation expired on July 6, 2010. On June 2, 2010, Aero Star and Faby Apache lost the AAA World Mixed Tag Team Championship to La Legión Extranjera representatives Alex Koslov and Christina Von Eerie. On October 1, 2010, at Héroes Inmortales IV Apache regained the championship from Koslov and Von Eerie with her new partner Pimpinela Escarlata. Apache and Escarlata lost the title to Jennifer Blake and Alan Stone on March 13, 2011. In August 2011, Faby and her sister worked a tour of Japan, working with Oz Academy and Pro Wrestling Wave. On April 6, 2012, Mari Apache turned ruda and started a rivalry with Faby. On November 27, Apache returned to Japan, when she took part in the 2012 Reina de Reinas tournament co-produced by AAA and Pro Wrestling Wave in Tokyo's Korakuen Hall. Apache was eliminated from the tournament in her opening match by Kaguya. On March 17, 2013, at Rey de Reyes, Apache defeated LuFisto, Mari Apache and Taya in a tournament final to win the vacant Reina de Reinas Championship for the second time. On July 19, Apache became a double champion, when she and Drago defeated Halloween and Mari Apache for the AAA World Mixed Tag Team Championship. They lost the title to Pentagón Jr. and Sexy Star on April 19, 2014. On August 17 at Triplemanía XXII, Apache lost the Reina de Reinas Championship to Taya.

On March 5, 2017, Apache defeated Ricky Marvin in a title vs. career match to make herself, her father and her sister the new AAA World Trios Champions. although Mari and El Apache did not show up for defenses, during her first defense, her partners were Monster Clown and Murder Clown. Even though Monster and Murder were rudos, the team managed to keep the titles on Faby. On April 21, Faby brought out Dr. Wagner Jr. and Psycho Clown as her partners in a defense against the El Nuevo Poder del Norte team of Soul Rocker, Mocho Cota Jr. and Carta Brava Jr. In the end, El Nuevo Poder del Norte won the titles.

The storyline between Lady Shani and Faby Apache continued at the 2018 Triplemanía XXVI where Shani defeated Faby Apache in a Lucha de Apuesta match, in no small part thanks to the interference of La Parka.

She left the promotion on August 30, 2022.

At TripleMania 34, Apache competed in her 24th TripleMania. Nattie, La Hiedra and she lost to Roxanne Perez for the number 1 contender for Reyna de Reynas (Queen of Queens) title.

Apache made her Impact Wrestling debut on the September 20, 2018, episode of Impact! when she defeated Alisha Edwards, which was filmed in Mexico. After the match, Apache challenged Tessa Blanchard. On September 27 episode of Impact, Apache unsuccessfully challenged Blanchard for the Impact Knockouts Championship. On the October 19, 2019, episode of Xplosion, Apache earned her first win on Impact by defeating Alisha Edwards, which was filmed in Mexico. On April 1, 2022, at Multiverse of Matches, Apache challenged AAA Reina de Reinas Champion Deonna Purrazzo for the title, however, was unsuccessful.

=== All Elite Wrestling (2019) ===
Apache made her All Elite Wrestling (AEW) debut by marking a surprise appearance at All Out, participating in the Casino Battle Royale, where she was eliminated by Nyla Rose.

== Personal life ==
Balbuena comes from a wrestling family, she's the second daughter of Mario Balbuena González, who wrestled as Gran Apache. Her older sister Mariella wrestles as Mari Apache. She is the stepdaughter of Sandra González Calderón, better known as Lady Apache although Balbuena's father and Lady Apache divorced years ago. She was married to wrestler José Roberto Islas García, known as Billy Boy and together the couple have a son called Marvin.

== Championships and accomplishments ==
- Arsion
  - Sky High of Arsion Championship (1 time)
- Lucha Libre AAA Worldwide
  - AAA Reina de Reinas Championship (4 times)
  - AAA World Mixed Tag Team Championship (4 times) — with Gran Apache (1), Aero Star (1), Pimpinela Escarlata (1) and Drago (1)
  - AAA World Trios Championship (1 time) – with El Apache and Mary Apache
  - Lucha Libre World Cup: 2016 Women's division – with Lady Apache and Mary Apache
- Kaoz Lucha Libre
  - Kaoz Women's Championship (1 time)
  - Copa Martha Villalobos (2019)
- Pro Wrestling Illustrated
  - Ranked No. 44 of the top 100 female wrestlers in the PWI Female 100 in 2019

== Luchas de Apuestas record ==
Winner (wager)	Loser (wager)	Location	Event	Date	Notes
Faby Apache (hair)	La Hechicera (hair)	Orizaba, Veracruz	Live event	November 2, 2002	
Faby Apache (hair)	May Flowers (hair)	Naucalpan, Mexico State	Live event	October 19, 2003	(Note: This was a Relevos mixtos Intergender match.)
Faby Apache (hair)	Mari Apache (hair)	Mexico City	Triplemanía XVI	June 13, 2008	
Sexy Star (hair)	Faby Apache (hair)	Ciudad Madero, Tamaulipas	Guerra de Titanes	December 11, 2009	
Lady Shani (mask)	Faby Apache (hair)	Mexico City	Triplemanía XXVI	August 25, 2018	
