= Mari Apache =

Mexican professional wrestler (born 1979)

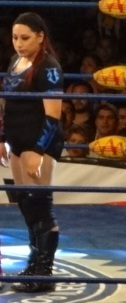
- Mari in 2013

Personal information
- Born: Mariella Balbuena Torres; October 19, 1979 (age 46)
- Children: Natsumi (daughter)
- Parent: Gran Apache (father)
- Relatives: Faby Apache (sister); Lady Apache (Step mother); Marvin Apache (nephew)

Professional wrestling career
- Ring name(s): La Maestra; Lady Venum; Love; Mari Apache; Princesa Apache
- Billed height: 1.60 m (5 ft 3 in)
- Billed weight: 70 kg (150 lb)
- Trained by: Gran Apache
- Debut: 1996
- Retired: 2023?

Mariella Balbuena Torres (born October 19, 1979) is a Mexican professional wrestler best known under the ring name Mari Apache (sometimes written as "Mary Apache"). She is the daughter of luchador Gran Apache and the sister of professional wrestler Faby Apache. She has wrestled for an extended period of time in Japan but is best known for working in Lucha Libre AAA Worldwide along with her father and sister. She is a former one-time AAA Reina de Reinas Champion and a two-time AAA World Mixed Tag Team Champion, having held the title with her father and Halloween. Torres has previously wrestled under the ring name Princesa Apache and as the masked character Love and Lady Venum.

== Professional wrestling career ==
Mariella Balbuena trained with her father Mario Balbuena González, better known as Gran Apache, who is one of Mexico's most prolific trainers of female professional wrestlers. She made her debut in 1996, at the age of 17, working under the ring name Princesa Apache, playing off her father's Native American ring character. Through her father's position with Lucha Libre AAA Worldwide, one of Mexico's largest wrestling promotions, she began working for AAA upon making her debut. In either late 1996 or early 1997 she adopted a new ring character, a masked character called "Love". Although she was masked, AAA did not hide the fact that she was the daughter of Gran Apache. The "Love" character only lasted about six months before Torres was given a new character. She became a part of a female version of the popular AAA stable Los Cadetes Del Espacio, wrestling as the masked "Lady Venum" a female version of Venum. She teamed up with Lady Discovery, Lady Luxor to form Las Cadetas del Espacion in later 1997. Las Cadetas teamed up with Xóchitl Hamada to defeat the team of La Fugitiva, La Migala, La Practicante and Martha Villalobos in the opening match of the 1997 Guerra de Titanes show. Not long after Guerra de Titanes Torres left AAA, giving the "Lady Venum" character to her younger sister Fabiola Torres, while adopting the ring name Mari Apache. Mari travelled to Japan to gain more experience, wrestling for a variety of Japanese all-female promotions such as All Japan Women's Pro-Wrestling, Gaea Japan and Arsion. In Arsion Mari Apache defeated Chaparita Asari on March 15, 2000, to win the Sky High of Arsion Championship. Apache lost the title on Ayako Hamada on August 12, 2000, during an Arsion event in Nagoya, Japan.

=== Lucha Libre AAA Worldwide (2007–2017) ===
Mari Apache returned to Mexico and began working full-time for AAA in 2007. Mari sided with her father Gran Apache in a long running storyline between Gran Apache and Mari's sister Faby Apache's "love interest" (and real-life husband) Billy Boy. On November 30, 2007, during the 2007 Guerra de Titanes, Gran and Mari Apache defeated Billy Boy and Faby Apache, Espiritu and La Diabólica, and Ayako Hamada and Mr. Niebla in a four-way match to win the vacant AAA World Mixed Tag Team Championship. The pair would successfully defend the title against the team of Super Caló and Rossy Moreno. Over the spring of 2008 the storyline between Gran Apache and Billy Boy evolved into Faby Apache fighting with Mari Apache, splitting the family. Gran Apache and Mari Apache successfully defended the mixed tag team title against Faby Apache and Billy Boy on April 20, 2008. The feud between the sisters was also the dominating storyline of the 2008 Reina de Reinas tournament. Mari defeated Chikayo Nagashima, Martha Villalobos, Sexy Star and Sonoko Kato to qualify for the finals. In the finals her younger sister Faby Apache defeated both Mari and Ayako Hamada to win the 2008 tournament. The feud between the sisters reached its conclusion at Triplemania XVI, where Faby Apache defeated her sister in a Lucha de Apuesta, hair vs. hair match. Following the match Gran Apache came to the ring and pleaded with Faby, persuading her to not shave Mary's hair off but instead shave his hair. The sacrifice by Gran Apache brought the family back together again. During the fall of 2008 Gran Apache and Mari successfully defended the mixed tag team title against the brother/sister team of El Oriental and Cinthia Moreno but was not able to defeat them a fourth time as they lost the AAA World Mixed Tag Team Championship at the 2008 Verano de Escandalo event on September 14, 2008. Over the next year Mari frequently teamed with her sister Faby, although she was not an integral part of the "family feud" that had turned into Faby Apache against Billy Boy. It was not until Faby Apache was attacked by La Legión Extranjera members Jennifer Blade and Rain, causing her to lose the Reina de Reinas championship to Sexy Sar during Heroes Inmortales III that Mari Apache became involved in the storyline. Mari, Faby and Cinthia Moreno faced off against La Legión members Sexy Star, Rain and Christina Von Eerie during the 2010 Rey de Reyes event, a match which Moreno won for her team by pinning Sexy Star. During a post Rey de Reyes interview Sexy Star claimed that the Apaches and Cintia Moreno were nothing but maids, which led to AAA booking a Triplemania XVIII match between Cinthia Moreno, Faby and Mari Apache against Sexy Star, Rain and Jennifer Blade in a match where the person pinned or submitted would have to be the winning team's slave for a month. At Triplemania La Legión defeated Moreno and the Apaches, when Blade pinned Mari, thanks in part to the biased refereering by Hijo del Tirantes. Following the match Konnan ordered Mari Apache to begin her maid duty right away by cleaning up their dressing room. The stipulation expired on July 6, 2010. On August 14 at Verano de Escandalo the Apaches and Aero Star faced Reina de Reinas Champion Sexy Star and Mixed Tag Team Champions Alex Koslov and Christina Von Eerie in a six-person tag team match, where both titles were on the line. In the end Mari pinned Sexy Star to win the Reina de Reinas Championship for the first time.

In 2011, Apache aligned with her fellow AAA technicas to battle the invading female wrestlers from American promotion Total Nonstop Action Wrestling (TNA). At Triplemanía XIX, Sexy Star and TNA's Angelina Love, Mickie James and Velvet Sky defeated the Apaches, Cynthia Moreno and Lolita in an eight-woman tag team match. On July 9, James and Sexy Star defeated Mari and Faby in a tag team match, after which James challenged Mari to a match for her title. On July 31 at Verano de Escándalo, Apache lost the AAA Reina de Reinas Championship to Pimpinela Escarlata in an eight-way elimination match. In August 2011, Mari and her sister worked a tour of Japan, working with Oz Academy and Pro Wrestling Wave. On April 6, 2012, Mari turned ruda and started a rivalry with her sister. On October 7, 2012, at Héroes Inmortales, Mari and Halloween defeated Alan Stone and Jennifer Blake, Atomic Boy and Faby Apache, Fénix and Lolita in a four-way match to win the AAA World Mixed Tag Team Championship. They lost the title to Drago and Faby Apache on July 19, 2013. The following month, Mari continued her feud against her sister by joining La Secta.

On September 28, 2014, Apache returned to Japan and Pro Wrestling Wave, teaming with Ayako Hamada and Yuu Yamagata in six-woman tag team match, where they defeated Hikaru Shida, Tomoka Nakagawa and Yumi Ohka, with Apache pinning Shida, the reigning Wave Single Champion, for the win. This led to Apache unsuccessfully challenging Shida for both the Wave Single Championship and the RCW Women's Championship on October 29. During her time in Japan, Apache also worked for Oz Academy and Michinoku Pro Wrestling.

=== World Wonder Ring Stardom (2017–2019) ===
In 2017, Apache relocated to Japan, where she began working regularly for World Wonder Ring Stardom. It was also announced that her daughter Natsumi had started training professional wrestling and would debut in Japan. On August 13, Apache defeated Shanna for the High Speed Championship. On September 24, Apache made her first successful title defense on against Hiromi Mimura. On December 24, Apache defeated Starlight Kid for her second successful title defense.

On January 21, 2018, at Stardom's seventh anniversary, Apache defeated Kay Lee Ray for her third successful title defense. Apache teamed with her sister Faby Apache on March 31, when they unsuccessfully challenged Hana Kimura and Kagetsu for their Goddesses of Stardom Championship. At Mask Fiesta 2018 on October 28, Apache, under the ring name La Maestra, teamed up with Hanita in a loss to Candy Skull and Marty Scurll. On December 24, Apache lost the championship to Hazuki.

== Personal life ==
Mariella Torres comes from a wrestling family, she's the oldest daughter of Mario Balbuena González, who wrestled as Gran Apache. Her younger sister Fabiola wrestles as Faby Apache. She is the stepdaughter of Sandra González Calderón, better known as Lady Apache although Torres' father and Lady Apache divorced years ago. Torres also has a younger sister Jessica, who briefly worked as Baby Apache. She is the sister-in-law of wrestler José Roberto Islas García, known as Billy Boy, who was married to Fabiola, as well as the aunt to their son Marvin.

== Championships and accomplishments ==
- Arsion
  - Sky High of Arsion Championship (1 time)
- Lucha Libre AAA Worldwide
  - AAA Reina de Reinas Championship (1 time)
  - AAA World Mixed Tag Team Championship (2 times)– with Gran Apache (1) and Halloween (1)
  - AAA World Trios Championship (1 time) – with El Apache and Faby Apache
  - Lucha Libre World Cup: 2016 Women's division – with Faby Apache and Lady Apache
- Pro Wrestling Illustrated
  - Ranked No. 75 of the top 100 female wrestlers in the PWI Female 100 in 2018
- World Wonder Ring Stardom
  - High Speed Championship (1 time)

== Luchas de Apuestas record ==
Winner (wager)	Loser (wager)	Location	Event	Date	Notes
Faby Apache (hair)	Mari Apache (hair)	Mexico City	Triplemania XVI	June 13, 2008	
Mari Apache (hair)	Súper Estrella (mask)	Guadalajara, Jalisco	Live event	March 6, 2011	
