= Leticia Cline =

American model and wrestling announcer

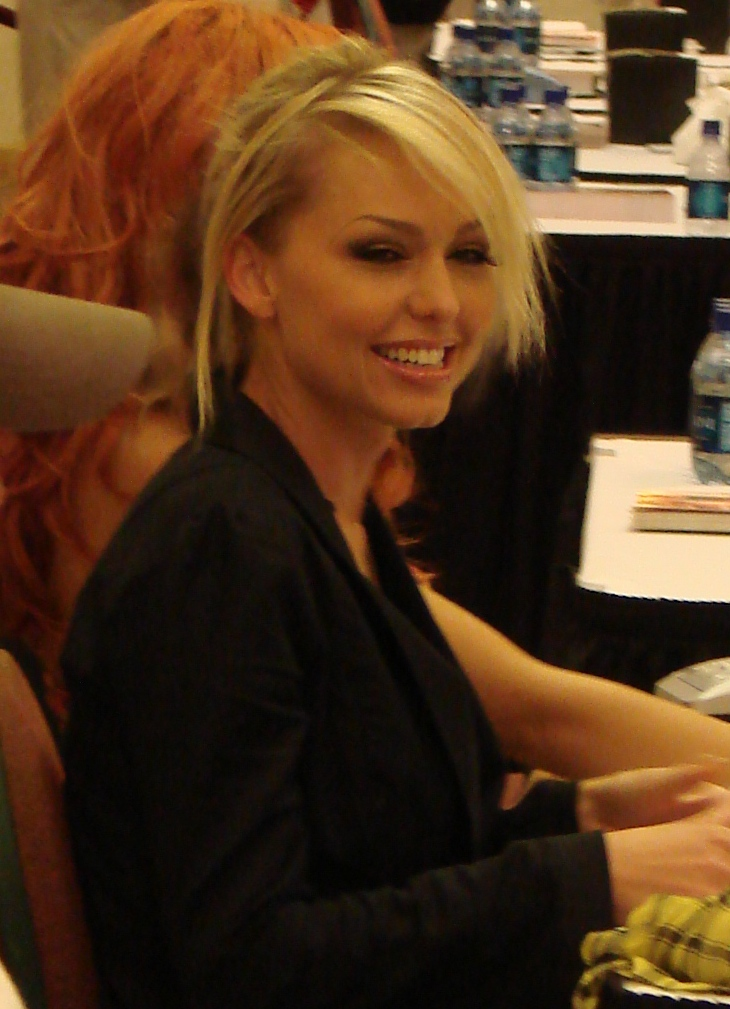
- Born: Leticia Ann Bjork Passmore; October 1, 1978 (age 48); Cave City, Kentucky
- Occupations: Journalist; Model; Actress; Interviewer
- Years active: 2014–present (Journalist); 1992–present (Model); 2006–2008 (Actress); 2006–2007 (Interviewer)
- Children: 1

Leticia Ann Bjork Passmore, a.k.a. Leticia Cline (born October 1, 1978) is an American journalist and model. She is best known as a former interviewer for TNA Wrestling, Maxim Magazine, the reality show Beauty and the Geek and her Playboy magazine appearance in July 2008.

== Early career ==
Cline began modeling at the age of 14. She went on to appear in a number of American magazines and spent a year modeling in Tokyo, Japan. She then focused on her education, earning degrees in psychology and finance from the University of Kentucky in 2000 and eventually became a certified public accountant; she worked as an accountant for four years. She also married and had a son, but the marriage broke up soon after.

Since 2014, Cline was co-founder partner of Standard Motorcycle Co in Orlando, Florida). In 2015, she was invited by "Gentleman´s Ride" to make the 2015 video of Distinguished Gentleman's Ride (a charity event held upon the last Sunday in September in cities worldwide, to raise awareness and funds for prostate cancer research and men's mental health programs).

In 2017, Cline became the first and only female Harley Hooligan Flattrack racer and even competed in the4 2017 ESPN X Games. Cline has completed many cross country motorcycle trips including a few Iron Butt awards.

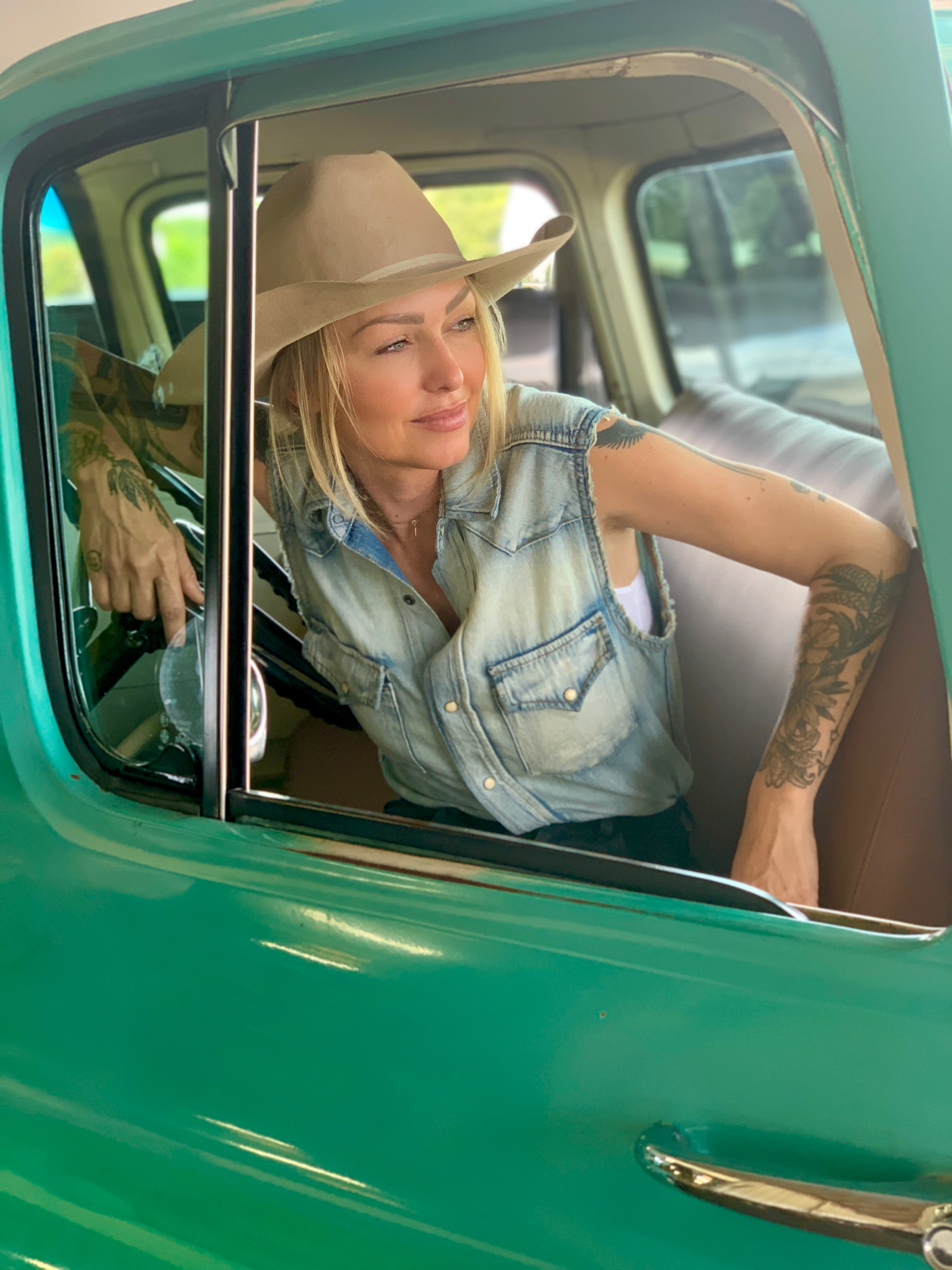
Cline at a meeting about Cars and Coffee.

In 2018, Cline moved back to her hometown, Cave City, Kentucky and opened a free community motorcycle garage named Smiley's after her late father. Cline also opened a bar, The Dive, with her sister and mother. Cline sits on Cave City City Council Also renovated a historic theater called “The Ace” and reopened it to the public as a coffee shop.

== Television ==
On October 23, 2006, Total Nonstop Action Wrestling producer Jessie Ward recruited Cline to TNA as an interviewer, complementing Jeremy Borash. Cline made her television debut on the November 30, 2006 episode of TNA Impact!. She took a break from TNA in the beginning of fall 2007 to concentrate on other projects. Her final appearance with TNA was on their first ever two-hour show. Cline was officially granted her release from TNA on November 25, 2007.

Cline was a Beauty on the 2008 season of the reality show Beauty and the Geek (Season 5). On week 5 of B&G, Matt Carter and Leticia won The Young and the Restless Soap Opera Challenge. They were eliminated in the series finale and got third place.

In 2008, Cline appeared as herself in the movie Last International Playboy and herself in the indy movie Closing Time.

In 2019, Cline played the role of Trixie in the movie Disturbing The Peace alongside Guy Pearce and Devon Sawa.

Cline appeared on the Howard Stern reality television show Bowling Beauties in 2008, but lost in the third episode.

== Personal life ==
In July 2021, TMZ broke the story of Cline dating American Pickers star Mike Wolfe. The two have been friends since 2018.
