= Tristar Productions =

American sports company

Tristar Productions, Inc.
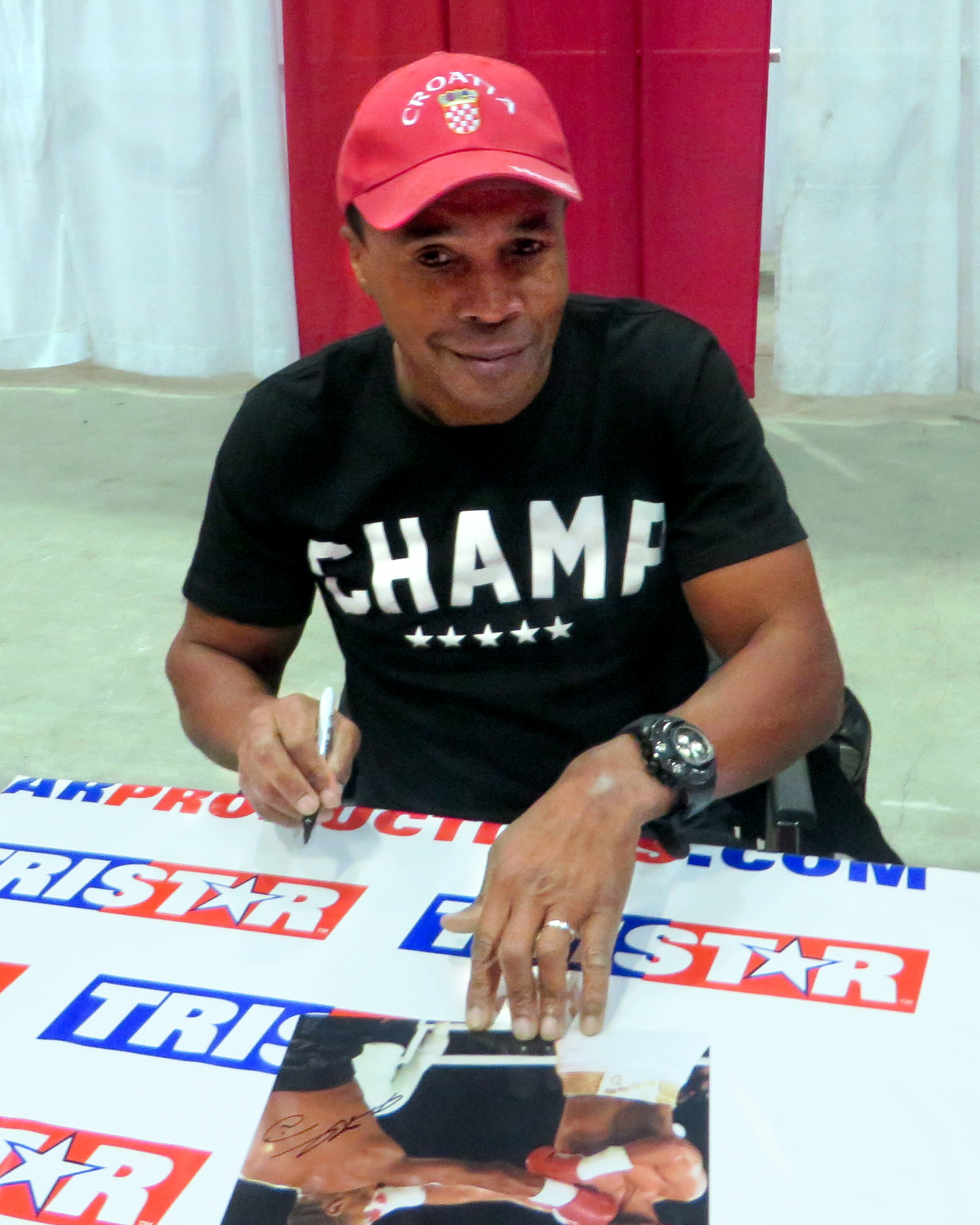
- Sugar Ray Leonard signs autographs at a Tristar Productions show in January 2014.
- Company type: Private
- Industry: Collectibles, Memorabilia
- Founded: Houston, Texas; United States (1987)
- Headquarters: Houston, Texas; United States
- Area served: United States (services) Worldwide (products)
- Key people: Jeffrey R. Rosenberg (President)
- Products: Autographed baseballs, Autographed football helmets, Autographed photographs, Trading cards
- Services: Advertising, Promotion
- Website: tristarproductions.com

Tristar Productions, Inc. promotes sports collectible events, distributes autographed sports memorabilia, and manufactures and distributes trading cards. The company was founded in 1987, in Houston, Texas, by Jeffrey R. Rosenberg. At Tristar's collectors shows, current and former sports players autograph memorabilia. The organization distributes trading cards for organizations including Minor League Baseball and Total Nonstop Action Wrestling.

== The organization ==
Rosenberg promoted his first trade show in 1987, forming Tristar Productions, Inc. in the process. Since then, Tristar has continued to promote events, and has produced and participated in the National Sports Collectors Convention. During events Tristar will host booths where current and retired Major League Baseball, National Basketball Association, National Football League players and professional wrestlers will hold autograph signings. The autographed sports memorabilia is also distributed outside of trade shows.

Tristar distributes autographed sports memorabilia, such as autographed baseballs, baseball bats, batting helmets, footballs, football helmets, jerseys and photographs. They have run a Hidden Treasure promotion where consumers can purchase undisclosed autographed material, for a chance at rare and valuable autographed memorabilia, such as a Babe Ruth and Roger Maris autographed baseball.

In August 2006, Tristar signed an exclusive agreement with Major League Baseball Properties to produce Minor League Baseball trading cards. The license granted Tristar exclusive rights to produce first year trading cards of drafted and undrafted amateur players selected from the Major League Baseball draft. Tristar has produced first year cards from 2006 to 2009, in a series called TriStar Prospects Plus. From that series, Tristar has also released autographed trading cards from 2006 to 2009, and memorabilia cards in 2006 and 2008. In 2010, Tristar released a series of trading cards called Tristar Pursuit, along with autographed cards.

In March 2008, Tristar acquired an exclusive license deal from Total Nonstop Action Wrestling to produce and distribute TNA trading cards and memorabilia. Tristar has produced TNA cards, as well as TNA autographed and memorabilia cards, from 2008 to 2010.
