= Ayako Hamada =

Mexican professional wrestler (born 1981)

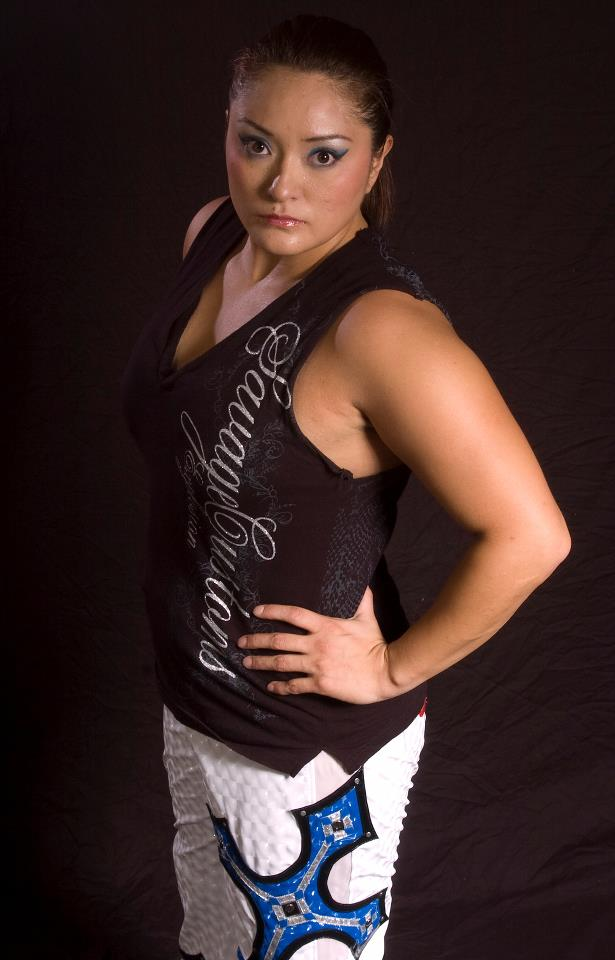
- Hamada in 2012

Personal information
- Born: Ayako Valentina Hamada Villarreal; February 14, 1981 (age 45) Mexico City, Mexico
- Parent: Gran Hamada (father)
- Relatives: Xóchitl Hamada (sister); Pentagón Black (brother-in-law); Silver King (ex-brother-in-law)

Professional wrestling career
- Ring name(s): Arisin Z Ayako Hamada; Dokron Z Ebekosan; Estrella Ayako Ohka; Hamada; Mexico Hamada
- Billed height: 1.62 m (5 ft 4 in)
- Billed weight: 65 kg (143 lb)
- Billed from: Tokyo, Japan; Mexico City, Mexico
- Trained by: Aja Kong; Mariko Yoshida; Gran Hamada; Gran Apache
- Debut: August 9, 1998

Ayako Valentina Hamada Villarreal (アヤコ・バレンティナ・ハマダ・ビジャレアル, Ayako Barentina Hamada Bijarearu; ring name: 浜田 文子; born February 14, 1981) is a Mexican Japanese professional wrestler. During her 20-year career, Hamada wrestled for various promotions, including All Japan Women's Pro-Wrestling, Gaea Japan and Pro Wrestling Wave in Japan, Consejo Mundial de Lucha Libre (CMLL) and Lucha Libre AAA Worldwide in Mexico and Shimmer Women Athletes and Total Nonstop Action Wrestling (TNA) in the United States. She is the daughter of Japanese professional wrestler Gran Hamada and the younger sister of fellow Mexican wrestler Xóchitl Hamada.

Hamada has won several titles in women's pro wrestling, including the WWWA World Single Championship and the AAAW Single Championship during the early 2000s and the TNA Knockouts Tag Team Championship two times during her time with TNA. She is also a former AAA Reina de Reinas Champion.

== Early life ==
Hamada was born in Mexico City, Mexico, as the daughter of Japanese professional wrestler Gran Hamada. Her elder sister is wrestler Xóchitl Hamada.

== Professional wrestling career ==
=== Japan and Mexico (1998–2008) ===
Ayako Hamada debuted at the age of seventeen against Candy Okutsu on August 9, 1998, for the Japanese Arsion promotion. She received an immediate push and won her first title, the Twin Star of Arsion Championship with Mika Akino, on June 30, 1999, less than one year after her debut. She won ZION 2000 on September 17, 2000, and the Queen of Arsion Championship from Aja Kong on December 3, 2000.

After leaving Arsion in 2001, she has won numerous women's titles in several Japanese and Mexican promotions, including the WWWA World Single Championship from Momoe Nakanishi on May 11, 2003, and the AAAW Single Championship from Dynamite Kansai on January 11, 2004, just one week after she had lost the WWWA title to Amazing Kong. From 2005 to 2006 Hamada performed in HUSTLE under the names Arisin Z and Dokron Z, before becoming affiliated with the Kaoru Ito Dojo.

Hamada was a regular for AAA in Mexico for most of 2007 and 2008. On November 30, 2007, she and Mr. Niebla were involved in four-way mixed tag team match with Billy Boy and Faby Apache, Espiritu and La Diabólica and Gran and Mari Apache for the vacant World Mixed Tag Team Championship. In November 2008, she left the promotion to join Martha Villalobos's wrestling school, where she worked as a trainer.

=== Total Nonstop Action Wrestling (2009–2010) ===
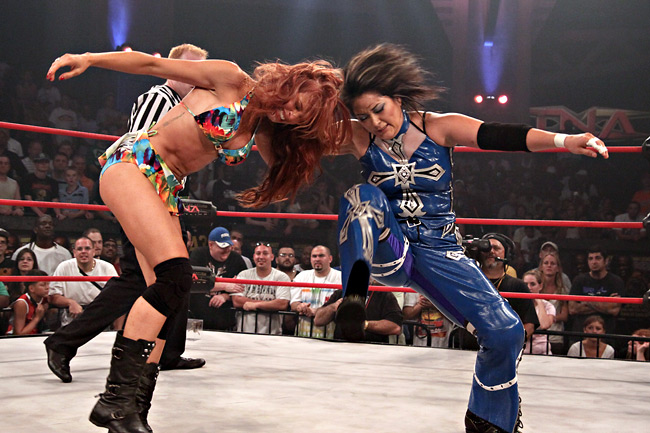
Hamada during a match with Christy Hemme in TNA in 2009

On April 8, 2009, it was announced at a press conference that the April 19 Ito Dojo show would be Hamada's final match in Japan as she had signed with Total Nonstop Action Wrestling. On August 6, 2009, Jeremy Borash announced on his Twitter page that Hamada would be starting with the company after the Hard Justice pay-per-view. On the August 27 edition of Impact!, Hamada made her debut as a face, defeating Daffney in a No Disqualification match. The following week on Impact! she and Sojo Bolt were eliminated in the first round of the Knockouts Tag Team Championship tournament by Tara and Christy Hemme, with Hamada afterwards hitting Bolt with the Hamada Driver. On the September 24 edition of Impact! she was assaulted by Alissa Flash while giving an interview. Flash proceeded to throw Hamada down some stairs, sparking a feud between the two. On the October 15 edition of Impact! Hamada defeated Flash in a Falls Count Anywhere match. On the November 19 and December 3 editions of Impact! Hamada beat Taylor Wilde and then Sarita, the Knockouts Tag Team Champions, with the Hamada Driver. On the December 10 edition of Impact!, Hamada was granted a TNA Global Championship shot by Kevin Nash, who was in charge for the evening. The champion, Eric Young, claimed that his group of foreign wrestlers, named World Elite, had been eyeing Hamada for some time and that this would be her initiation match. Though Hamada dominated the match, Young was able to retain his title by pinning her with his feet on the ropes. The following week Hamada and her new tag team partner Awesome Kong defeated Sarita and Wilde and the Beautiful People (Madison Rayne and Velvet Sky) in a three-way non-title tag team match. On the December 31 edition of Impact! Hamada defeated Madison Rayne and Roxxi on her way to the finals of a #1 contender's tournament, where she was defeated by ODB, after going through a table brought out by Awesome Kong. The following Monday on the live three-hour edition of Impact! Hamada and Kong defeated Sarita and Wilde to win the Knockouts Tag Team Championship. On March 1 Hamada's tag team partner Awesome Kong was reportedly released from TNA Wrestling, while the team still held the Knockouts Tag Team Championship. On the March 8 Monday night edition of Impact! Hamada and Kong were stripped of the titles after allegedly failing to defend them in 30 days, even though in fact the team defended the titles just 21 days prior against Madison Rayne and Velvet Sky.

After being off television for four months, Hamada returned on July 27 at the tapings of the August 5 edition of Impact!, teaming with Taylor Wilde to defeat The Beautiful People (Velvet Sky and Lacey Von Erich) to win the TNA Knockouts Tag Team Championship for the second time. In October 2010 Hamada returned to Japan and shortly afterwards requested her release from TNA. After months of inactivity in TNA, it was reported on December 6 that the promotion had agreed to release Hamada and vacate her Knockouts Tag Team Championship.

=== Shimmer Women Athletes (2009–2013) ===
On November 8, 2009, Hamada made her debut under her full name for Chicago-based all female wrestling promotion Shimmer Women Athletes, defeating Mercedes Martinez in a match taped for Volume 27 and losing to Sara Del Rey in a match taped for Volume 28. On February 5, 2010, Shimmer announced that Hamada would be returning to the company on April 11 for the tapings of Volumes 31 and 32. On Volume 31 she defeated Daizee Haze and on Volume 32 she was defeated in the main event by Cheerleader Melissa. Hamada returned to Shimmer on September 11, 2010, defeating Tomoka Nakagawa in a match taped for Volume 33. Later that day on Volume 34 she was defeated by Jessie McKay in a three-way match, which also included Sara Del Rey. The following day Hamada defeated Shimmer Tag Team Champion Nicole Matthews on Volume 35 and then took part in an elimination tag team match on Volume 36, where she, Ayumi Kurihara, Cheerleader Melissa and Serena Deeb defeated Daizee Haze, Madison Eagles, Sara Del Rey and Tomoka Nakagawa. On March 26, 2011, Hamada took part in the tapings of Volumes 37 and 38, during which she defeated Jessie McKay and Ayumi Kurihara, respectively, in singles matches. The following day, after pinning Shimmer Champion Madison Eagles on Volume 39 in a tag team match, where she teamed with Cheerleader Melissa and Eagles with Sara Del Rey, Hamada was granted a shot at the Shimmer Championship. Later that day, at the tapings of Volume 40, Hamada was unsuccessful in her attempt to win the title.

On August 26, 2011, it was announced that Hamada would return to the promotion on their tapings for Volumes 41 to 44 on October 1 and 2. On October 1 at the tapings of Volume 41, Hamada and Ayumi Kurihara defeated Daizee Haze and Tomoka Nakagawa to win the Shimmer Tag Team Championship. Hamada and Kurihara made their first title defense later that same day on Volume 42, defeating the Knight Dynasty (Britani and Saraya Knight). The following day the duo made successful defenses against the teams of Madison Eagles and Sara Del Rey, and the Canadian NINJAs (Nicole Matthews and Portia Perez). The team made their fourth defense of the title at a Joshi 4 Hope event in Tokyo on February 22, 2012, defeating former champions Hiroyo Matsumoto and Misaki Ohata. This was the first time the Shimmer Tag Team Championship was defended outside North America. Hamada returned to Shimmer on March 17, when she and Kurihara successfully defended the Shimmer Tag Team Championship against Regeneration X (Allison Danger and Leva Bates) on Volume 45. Hamada's and Kurihara's sixth successful title defense took place later that same day on Volume 46, when they defeated Hailey Hatred and Kalamity. The following day on Volume 47, Hamada and Kurihara successfully defended the title against the team of Leon and Ray. Later that day on Volume 48, Hamada and Kurihara lost the title to Courtney Rush and Sara Del Rey in a four-way elimination match, which also included the Canadian NINJAs and Regeneration X. Hamada returned to Shimmer on October 27, 2012, when she defeated Kalamity on Volume 49 and Kana on Volume 50. The following day on Volumes 51 and 52, Hamada defeated Portia Perez and Athena, respectively, to finish her weekend with a clean record of four wins out of four matches. On April 6, 2013, Hamada took part in Shimmer's first internet pay-per-view, Volume 53, where she was defeated by Athena.

=== Other promotions (2010–2018) ===
On January 9, 2010, Hamada made her debut for Jersey All Pro Wrestling's Women's Division in a match, where she defeated Rachel Summerlyn. Later in the night she challenged Sara Del Rey to a match for the Women's Championship and Del Rey agreed to face her at any time and anywhere.

In December 2011, Hamada took part in American promotion Chikara's JoshiMania weekend, teaming with Cherry to defeat Mayumi Ozaki and Mio Shirai in her night one match on December 2. The following day, Hamada was defeated by Aja Kong in the main event. On the third and final night of the tour, Hamada was defeated in another main event, this time by Sara Del Rey.

=== Pro Wrestling Wave (2011–2018) ===
After returning to Japan from the United States in 2011, Hamada began working for Pro Wrestling Wave, where she aligned herself with the villainous Black Dahlia stable. On July 2, 2012, Hamada signed a contract to officially make Wave her new home promotion. On October 6, 2013, Hamada and her Las Aventureras tag team partner Yuu Yamagata won the 2013 Dual Shock Wave tournament. On October 30, Hamada and Yamagata defeated the Classic Gals (Cherry and Shuu Shibutani) to win the Wave Tag Team Championship, Hamada's first title in Wave. After a reign of 270 days, the longest in the title's history, Hamada and Yamagata lost the title to Yankii Nichokenju (Isami Kodaka and Yuko Miyamoto) on July 27, 2014. They regained the title from Revolucion Amandla (Kyoko Kimura and Tomoka Nakagawa) on October 29. On February 11, 2015, Hamada became a double champion, when she defeated Hikaru Shida for the Wave Single Championship. On March 15, Hamada and Yamagata lost the Wave Tag Team Championship to Mio Shirai and Misaki Ohata. On October 30, Hamada and Yamagata won the Wave Tag Team Championship for the third time, when they defeated Kayoko Haruyama and Tsubasa Kuragaki in the finals of the 2015 Dual Shock Wave tournament. On December 27, Hamada lost the Wave Single Championship to her tag team partner Yuu Yamagata. On August 7, 2016, Hamada and Yamagata lost the Wave Tag Team Championship to Misaki Ohata and Ryo Mizunami.

=== Return to AAA (2017) ===
On March 19, 2017, Hamada returned to Mexico and AAA, defeating Taya to win the AAA Reina de Reinas Championship, 18 years after her sister Xóchitl became the inaugural champion. Taya regained the title by defeating her during a live event on April 21, 2017; at 33 days, Hamada's reign is the shortest in the title's history.

=== Return to other promotions (2019–present) ===
After a year, Hamada came out of retirement in July 2019. Her first match back was held on July 21 for Pro Wrestling Mexico, teaming with Chik Tormenta, defeating Taya Valkyrie and Star Fire.

=== Second return to AAA (2019–present) ===
On August 3, 2019, at Triplemanía XXVII, Hamada made her return to AAA, where she participated in a Tables, Ladders, and Chairs match for the vacant Reina de Reinas Championship, which was won by Tessa Blanchard.

== Personal life ==
Hamada is fluent in both Japanese and Spanish.

Via her sister Xóchitl Hamada's marriages, she is sister-in-law to wrestlers Pentagón Black and Silver King.

== Legal issues ==
Hamada was arrested on May 13, 2018, for possession of methamphetamine. Her arrest resulted in Pro Wrestling Wave terminating her contract and Sendai Girls' Pro Wrestling stripping her of the Sendai Girls World Championship. On July 18, 2018, she was given an 18-month prison sentence, suspended for three years. The same day, Hamada announced her retirement from pro wrestling, hoping to find work as an interpreter. However she returned to wrestling the following year.

== Championships and accomplishments ==
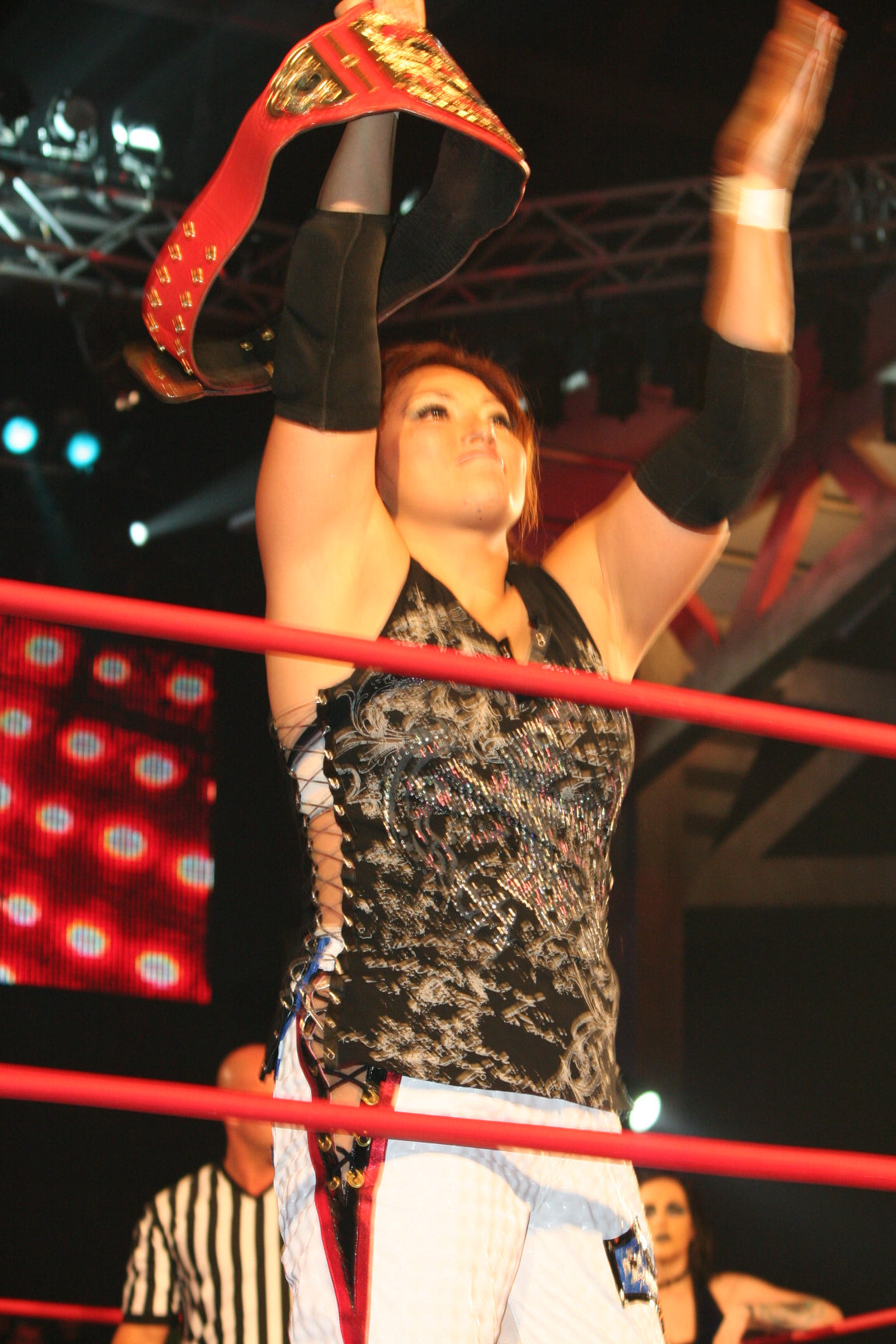
Hamada as a TNA Knockouts Tag Team Champion

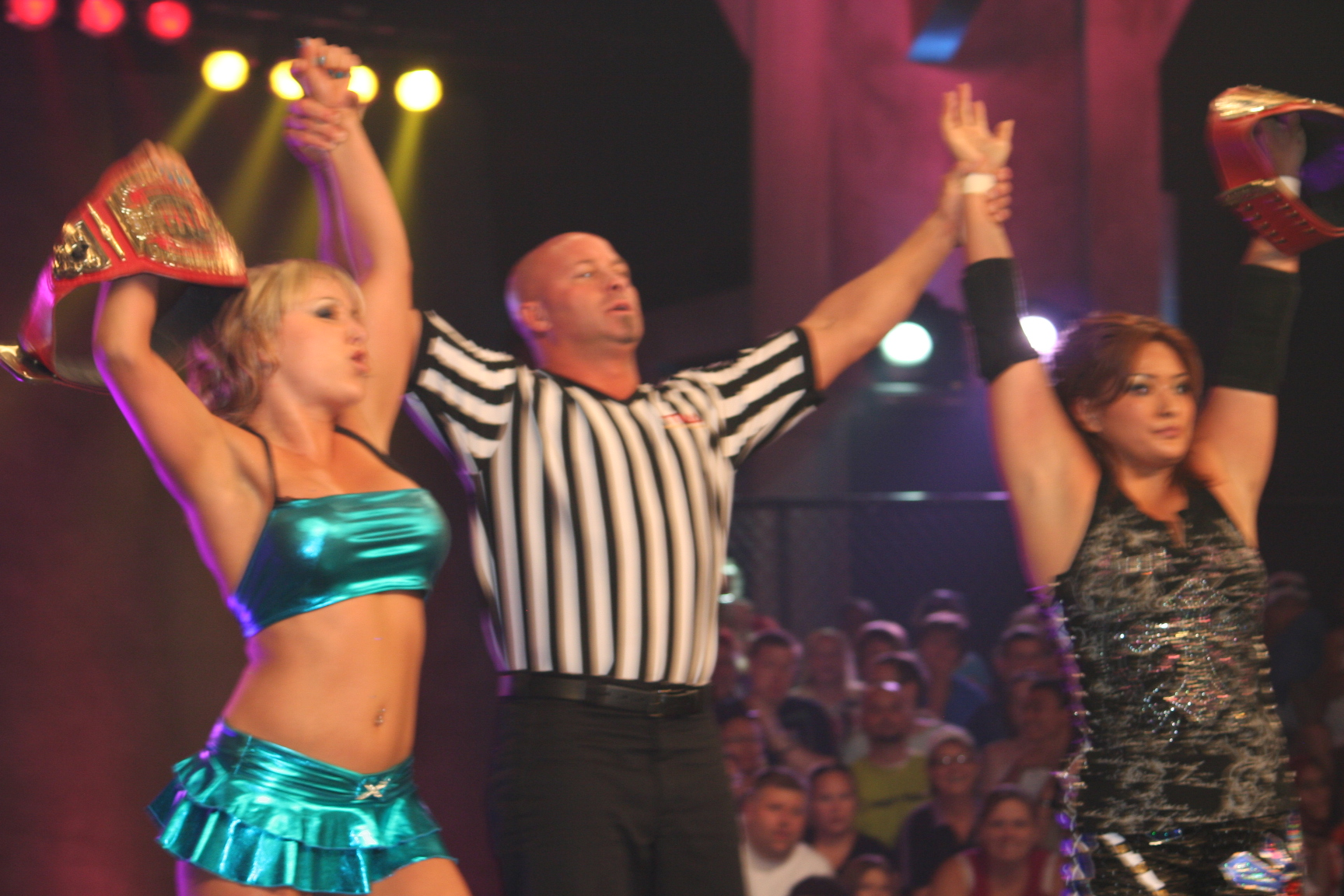
Hamada in her second reign as TNA Knockouts Tag Team Champion, with her partner Taylor Wilde

- All Japan Women's Pro-Wrestling
  - WWWA World Single Championship (2 times)
  - WWWA World Tag Team Championship (1 time) – with Nanae Takahashi
  - Tag League the Best (2003) – with Nanae Takahashi
- Arsion
  - Queen of Arsion Championship (1 time)
  - Sky High of Arsion Championship (1 time)
  - Twin Star of Arsion Championship (2 times) – with Mika Akino (1), Michiko Omukai (1)
  - P*Mix Tag Team Championship (1 time, current) – with Gran Hamada
- Gaea Japan
  - AAAW Single Championship (1 time)
  - AAAW Tag Team Championship (1 time) – with Meiko Satomura
  - High-Spurt 600 Tournament (2003)
- Azteca Karate Extremo
  - AKE Women's Championship (1 time, current)
- International Wrestling Revolution Group
  - IWRG Intercontinental Women's Championship (1 time)
- Lucha Libre AAA Worldwide
  - AAA Reina de Reinas Championship (1 time)
- NEO Japan Ladies Pro Wrestling
  - NEO Tag Team Championship (1 time) – with Kaoru Ito
- Pro Wrestling Illustrated
  - Ranked No. 18 of the top 50 female wrestlers in the PWI Female 50 in 2011
- Pro Wrestling Wave
  - Wave Single Championship (1 time)
  - Wave Tag Team Championship (3 times) – with Yuu Yamagata
  - Dual Shock Wave (2013, 2015) – with Yuu Yamagata
  - Catch the Wave Award (2 times)
    - Best Bout Award (2013) vs. Ryo Mizunami on May 26
    - Best Performance Award (2015) as part of the Wonderful World Fairy Family
- Sendai Girls' Pro Wrestling
  - Sendai Girls World Championship (1 time)
  - Battlefield War Tournament (2007)
- Shimmer Women Athletes
  - Shimmer Tag Team Championship (1 time) – with Ayumi Kurihara
- Tokyo Sports
  - Joshi Puroresu Grand Prize (2003)
- Total Nonstop Action Wrestling
  - TNA Knockouts Tag Team Championship (2 times) – with Awesome Kong (1) and Taylor Wilde (1)
- Universal Wrestling Association
  - UWA World Women's Championship (1 time)
- World Wrestling Association
  - WWA World Women's Championship (1 time)

== Luchas de Apuestas record ==
| Winner (wager) | Loser (wager) | Location | Event | Date | Notes |
|---|---|---|---|---|---|
| Ayako Hamada (hair) | Xóchitl Hamada (hair) | Tokyo, Japan | Live event | December 24, 2000 | |
