= ZION (wrestling tournament) =

- Promotions: Arsion
- First event: ZION '98
- Last event: ZION 2002

ZION, was a joshi puroresu (women's professional wrestling) single elimination tournament that was promoted by Arsion. The tournament was typically held between August and October each year. The tournament was held from 1998 until 2002, as the promotion folded in 2003.

== ZION '98 ==
The ZION '98 Tournament was held on August 31, 1998. It featured 8 competitors and was won by Mariko Yoshida, who defeated Ayako Hamada in the finals. The winner of this tournament earned the right to face the winner of the ARS '98 tournament winner, who was Candy Okutsu to crown the first Queen of Arsion Champion.

ZION Tournament 1998

Quarterfinals
Ayako Hamada | W
Mari Apache
Rie Tamada
Mikiko Futagami | W
Michiko Omukai | W
Yumi Fukawa
Reggie Bennett
Mariko Yoshida | W

Semifinals
Ayako Hamada | W
Mikiko Futagami
Michiko Omukai
Mariko Yoshida | W

Finals
Ayako Hamada
Mariko Yoshida | W

== ZION '99 ==
The ZION '99 Tournament was held on August 22, 1999. It featured 8 competitors and was won by Michiko Omukai, who defeated Mima Shimoda in the finals. Mariko Yoshida, who was the defending champion and was originally scheduled for this tournament, was replaced by Rie Tamada.

ZION Tournament 1999

Quarterfinals
Mima Shimoda | W
Yumi Fukawa
Aja Kong | W
Hiromi Yagi
Michiko Omukai | W
Rie Tamada
Mikiko Futagami | W
Rie Tamada

Semifinals
Mima Shimoda | W
Aja Kong
Michiko Omukai | W
Mikiko Futagami

Finals
Mima Shimoda
Michiko Omukai | W

== ZION 2000 ==
The ZION 2000 Tournament was held on September 17, 2000. It featured 10 competitors and was won by Ayako Hamada, who defeated Mariko Yoshida in the finals. Both Aja Kong and GAMI received first round byes.

ZION Tournament 2000

Round 1
Mari Apache | W
Red Lynx | L
Ayako Hamada | W
Mima Shimoda | L

Quarterfinals
Aja Kong | W
Mari Apache | L
Mariko Yoshida | W
Piko | L
Michiko Omukai | L
Rie Tamada | W
Ayako Hamada | W
GAMI | L

Semifinals
Aja Kong | L
Mariko Yoshida | W
Rie Tamada | L
Ayako Hamada | W

Finals
Mariko Yoshida | L
Ayako Hamada | W

== ZION 2001 ==
The ZION 2001 Tournament was held on September 22, 2001. It featured 8 competitors and was won by GAMI, who defeated Azumi Hyuga in the finals.

ZION Tournament 2001

Quarterfinals
GAMI | W
noki-A
Michiko Omukai
Mima Shimoda
Mariko Yoshida | W
Ayako Hamada
Azumi Hyuga | W
Rie Tamada

Semifinals
GAMI | W
Mima Shimoda
Mariko Yoshida
Azumi Hyuga | W

Finals
GAMI | W
Azumi Hyuga

== ZION 2002 ==
The ZION 2002 Tournament was held on October 7, 2002. It featured 10 competitors and was won by Mariko Yoshida, who defeated noki-A in the finals.

ZION Tournament 2002

Round 1
Rie Tamada | W
Bionic J | L
Ai Fujita | W
Takako Inoue | L

Quarterfinals
noki-A | W
Rie Tamada | L
Michiko Omukai | W
Emi Tojo | L
GAMI | W
Shark Tsuchiya | L
Ai Fujita | L
Mariko Yoshida | W

Semifinals
noki-A | W
Michiko Omukai | L
GAMI | L
Mariko Yoshida | W

Finals
noki-A | L
Mariko Yoshida | W
