= Yumi Fukawa =

Japanese actress and professional wrestler

Personal information
- Born: Yumi Fukawa (府川唯未, Fukawa Yumi); May 22, 1976 (age 50) Yokosuka, Kanagawa, Japan
- Spouse: Minoru Tanaka (m. 2002)
- Children: 2 (including Kizuna Tanaka)

Professional wrestling career
- Ring name: Yumi Fukawa
- Billed height: 1.52 m (5 ft 0 in)
- Billed weight: 54 kg (119 lb)
- Trained by: All Japan Women's Pro-Wrestling
- Debut: November 12, 1993
- Retired: March 20, 2001

Yumi Tanaka (田中 唯未, Tanaka Yumi; née Fukawa (府川), born May 22, 1976) is a Japanese actress, tarento and retired professional wrestler. She is best known for her wrestling career, where she competed in both All Japan Women's Pro Wrestling (AJW) and Hyper Visual Fighting Arsion under her maiden name.

== Professional wrestling career ==
=== All Japan Women's Pro Wrestling (1993–1997) ===
Fukawa was an amateur wrestler during her high school years and applied to join the All Japan Women's Pro Wrestling dojo upon graduation in 1992 at the age of 17. She passed the tryout and was accepted, joining as the smallest wrestler on the entire roster at just barely 5 feet tall. Fukawa made her in ring debut at Korakuen Hall on November 12, 1993. In only her second professional match, however, Fukawa fractured her right clavicle and was forced to miss the rest of 1993 and all of 1994. She did however remain active during her absence, working for AJW as a referee and continuing to hone her wrestling skills in the dojo. Fukawa returned to the ring on January 13, 1995, teaming with Kayo Noumi in a loss to Mari Mogami and Yuka Shiina. Fukawa began to gain popularity for her looks, and soon after redebuting she formed the tag team TamaFuka with Rie Tamada. As TamaFuka, the two captured the AJW Tag Team Championship on March 17, 1995. They held the belts for 272 days, defending them well into 1996 until they lost to Chikayo Nagashima and Sugar Sato in September. Despite her popularity, Fukawa achieved little success in AJW outside of the tag division. She received one shot at the AJW Championship in February 1997, but lost to Rie Tamada. On August 20, Fukawa's longtime partner Rie Tamada announced she would follow Aja Kong in leaving AJW. Fukawa later announced her intention to do the same, and all three were gone from the company shortly after.

=== Arsion (1998–2000) ===
After leaving AJW, Aja Kong announced the formation of a new promotion, to be known as Hyper Visual Fighting Arsion. Both Fukawa and Tamada were two of the first to sign on, and Yumi wrestled on the debut show at Korakuen Hall, going to a time limit draw with Candy Okutsu in front of a sell out crowd. She took part in the Twin Stars of Arsion league in October 1998, teaming with Michiko Omukai. They defeated Mariko Yoshida and Mika Akino, but were eliminated by Ayako Hamada and Tiger Dream. She also joined Michiko Omukai's Vogue Impact Poison (V.I.P) stable along with Etsuko Mita and Mima Shimoda. In March 2000, she took part in the Battlarts/Arsion Kings and Queens tournament, a 6 man mixed tag team tournament teaming male wrestlers from Battlarts with female wrestlers from Arsion. Fukawa was teamed with Alexander Otsuka and Mariko Yoshida, and the trio was able to go on to win the tournament, beating Yuki Ishikawa, Ai Fujita and Candy Okutsu in the final. She also took part in the P-Mix Grand Prix, teaming with New Japan Pro-Wrestling's Minoru Tanaka. They made it to the final, where they lost to Ayako Hamada and her father Gran Hamada. After a match on July 16, 2000, Fukawa visited a doctor who diagnosed her with an acute subdural hematoma and subarachnoid hemorrhage. After this, Fukawa became inactive and officially retired in March 2001, defeating Mariko Yoshida in her retirement match.

=== Post-retirement ===
Since retiring from wrestling, Fukawa has worked as an actress and tarento, frequently appearing on television, commercials and radio to this day. She also began teaching a basic physical fitness class at the U-File Camp, a martial arts gym owned by MMA legend Kiyoshi Tamura. One of her first students was current professional wrestler Kazuhiro Tamura. In 2013, she began mentoring Mika Iida, a young wrestler who she offered to train. Iida debuted for Pro Wrestling Wave in 2013.

== Personal life ==
Fukawa met fellow professional wrestler Minoru Tanaka through Arsion/Battlarts' working relationship in 2000, and they began dating shortly after. After Fukawa retired in 2001, the two became engaged in January 2002 and married in June of the same year. Together, they have two children. Their eldest daughter Kizuna began training as a professional wrestler in 2022, and made her debut for Pro Wrestling Wave in April 2023.

== Championships and accomplishments ==
- All Japan Women's Pro-Wrestling
  - AJW Tag Team Championship (1 time) – with Rie Tamada
- Battlarts
  - Kings and Queens Tournament (2000) – with Mariko Yoshida and Alexander Otsuka
