= Kong =

Kong may refer to:

== Places ==
- Kong Empire (1710–1895), a former African state covering north-eastern Côte d'Ivoire and much of Burkina Faso
- Kong, Iran, a city on the Persian Gulf
- Kong, Shandong (孔镇), a town in Laoling, Shandong, China
- Kong, Ivory Coast, a town in Savanes District, Ivory Coast
- Kong River, in Southeast Asia
- Koh Kong (island), island in the Gulf of Thailand, in the coastal waters of Cambodia
- Mountains of Kong, a purported mountain range in Africa

== Arts and entertainment ==
=== Fictional characters ===
- King Kong, a fictional giant ape appearing in several films and other works since 1933
- Donkey Kong, a series of video games that feature various ape characters that use the Kong name
  - Donkey Kong (character)
  - Diddy Kong, Donkey Kong's partner
- Major T. J. "King" Kong, in the 1964 film Dr. Strangelove
- the title caveman character of Kong the Untamed, a 1975 comic book series
- Giant Robots Kongs, various characters from the Dai Sentai Goggle-V series
- Jake Kong, one of the three main characters from the original The Ghost Busters
- Mammoth Kong, a gigantic ape monster - see Moonlight Mask
- the title robotic monster of Marine Kong, a Japanese TV show
- Blues Kong, a blue colored bulldog/ape hybrid from Android Kikaider

=== Music ===
- Kong (band), a Dutch progressive metal band
- "Kong", a song by Tenacious D, released as a B-side on the "POD" single
- "Kong", a song by Neneh Cherry from her 2018 album Broken Politics

=== Rides ===
- Kong (Six Flags Discovery Kingdom), a roller coaster
- KONG (ride), a ride at Morey's Piers in Wildwood, New Jersey

=== Other ===
- "Kong!", episode 3 of the eighth season of Alvin and the Chipmunks (1983)
- Kong: The Animated Series, an unofficial animated series based on the King Kong character
- Kong: Skull Island, 2017 American film
- Kong Bananza, a transformation used by Donkey Kong in Donkey Kong Bananza

== People ==
- Kong (surname) (孔), a Chinese and Korean surname
- nickname of Gary Elkerton (born 1964), Australian surfer
- nickname of Robbie Green (born 1974), English darts player
- a stage name of Shawn Crahan (born 1969), American musician
- Erika Shishido (born 1970), female professional wrestler who went by the ring name of "Aja Kong"
- Kia Stevens (born 1977), female professional wrestler who went by the ring names of "Amazing Kong" and "Awesome Kong"

== Other uses ==
- Kōng, a concept in Chinese Zen Buddhism
- Kong Company, an American dog toy producer
- KONG (TV), a television station in Seattle, Washington

== See also ==
- Cong (disambiguation)
- King Kong (disambiguation)
- Donkey Kong (disambiguation)
