= Mika Akino =

Japanese professional wrestler

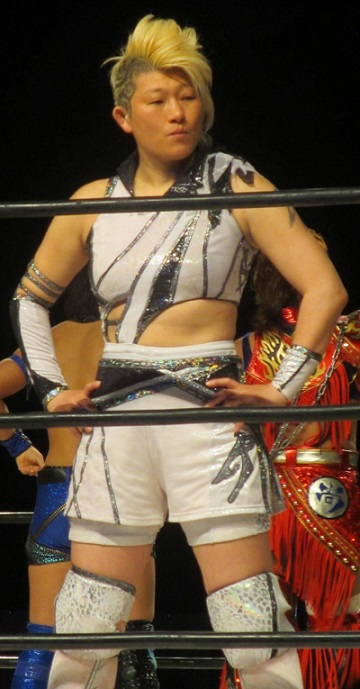
- Akino in April 2016

Personal information
- Born: October 24, 1973 (age 52) Adachi-ku, Tokyo, Japan

Professional wrestling career
- Ring name(s): Akino noki-A
- Billed height: 1.60 m (5 ft 3 in)
- Billed weight: 61 kg (134 lb)
- Debut: July 21, 1998

Mika Akino (秋野 美佳, Akino Mika), better known as Akino, (born October 24, 1973, in Tokyo, Japan) is a female Japanese joshi wrestler, signed to Oz Academy. Billed from Honshū, she started late in the sport and didn't debut until the age of 24. Trained by Mariko Yoshida, she proved to have an innate ring presence and excelled at the sport.

== Professional wrestling career ==
=== Early career ===
Akino debuted in the newly formed federation Arison (then run by Aja Kong) as Mika Akino. In her first months she floated around and tagged with fellow rookie Ayako Hamada now and again. Her most notable match was for the Queen of Arsion Championship, against her mentor, Yoshida. This match is considered by some to be the quintessential rookie versus veteran match of the 1990s, and both women were praised for their performance.

It wasn't long before Akino was repackaged as Akino, and placed in the stable called "Cazai", or Girls with Attitude. Fellow members included tag team partner Hamada, Ai Fujita, and Candy Okutsu. The heel stable gain notoriety and popularity within Arison. Hamada and Akino eventually won the Twin Star of Arsion Championship, which set the stage for possibly both women's biggest match in 1999.

Wrestling as "HamaKINO", the two champions entered a storyline with popular tag team "LCO" (Las Cachorras Orientales), made up of Etsuko Mita and Mima Shimoda. The story culminated in a bloody brawl that was later considered one of the matches of the year. Held at the Carnival '99 show, the match skyrocketed the popularity of HamaKINO, and cemented the two women as draws for the promotion.

The group split up later, and Akino went on to win the Sky High of Arsion Championship from Chaparita ASARI. Kong left ARSION after disputes with Rossy Ogawa, and joshi legend Lioness Asuka took her place. Hamada left not long after, and AKINO stayed. While she never won the Queen of Arsion Championship, she was involved in several spotlight storylines and matches, including tagging with Asuka and competing against Michiko Ohmukai.

=== Leaving Arison ===
After Asuka left, wrestler Yumiko Hotta took over and renamed Arison AtoZ. In 2003, Akino parted ways with the promotion, and declared herself a freelancer. Her mentor and friend Yoshida left AtoZ as well, as did wrestler Baby-M (at that time billed as Baby-A).

Akino began performing with other promotions, like Jd' and JWP. She also began training in mixed martial arts (MMA), and competed at the LoveImpact show, on February 8, 2004. She KO'd her opponent, a middle cup tournament winner, less than a minute into the match. She also competed at the SmackGirl show, on August 5, 2004, and went all three rounds against her opponent, winning by split decision.

During this time Akino wrestled primarily in Jd', JWP, and Gaea.

=== Forming M's Style ===
After leaving AtoZ, Akino joined with three other joshi wrestlers to form a new promotion. Her longtime friend Mariko Yoshida and fellow Arison wrestler Michiko Ohmukai joined her, and rising star Momoe Nakanishi also jumped on board. The name of their promotion, M's Style, stemmed from the fact that all four women's first names started with the letter "M".

M's Style held its first show in April 2004. At the time, the promotion was thought to be the future of joshi puroresu, and had been rumored to be working with puroresu powerhouse New Japan Pro-Wrestling. Nothing came of the partnership, and the promotion suffered another blow.

Momoe Nakanishi announced her retirement the same year, with nagging injuries being among the top reasons. Many in the joshi fan community considered this a death knell for M's Style, and expected the promotion to go under. It has stayed open. Running a show once a month, AKINO and Ohmukai still remain, with Yoshida occasionally wrestling, though she left to open Ibuki to train up the next generation of joshi wrestlers.

=== Present ===
M's Style closed in the Fall of 2006. After the final show, Akino announced she would be taking some time off from wrestling to let a lingering neck injury heal up.

While still teaching classes at U-FILE, she has scaled her wrestling appearances back dramatically, appearing in an Oz Academy show in January 2007 and in the Jaguar Yokota show on March 11, 2007.

In the meantime, she has taken up golfing and currently travels with a female golfer, Sakura, acting as her caddy while competing in tournaments herself.

One of her most notable students, who was also trained by Yoshida, is Ayumi Kurihara, who has tagged with Akino several times and also wrestled in M's Style.

Akino has held tag championships with Ranmaru and Tsubasa Kuragaki, and has held many singles titles as both Akino and her heel alter-ego noki-A.

Akino returned in mid-2007, working primarily with Oz Academy while freelancing with Pro Wrestling WAVE and performing in special shows held by Fuka.

She is currently a member of Aja Kong's Jungle Jack 21 stable along with Hiroyo Matsumoto and Tomoka Nakagawa. On April 24, 2013, Akino defeated Chikayo Nagashima to win the Oz Academy Openweight Championship for the first time. After a record-breaking eighteen-month reign, she lost the title to Tsubasa Kuragaki on October 13, 2014. She regained the title on May 17, 2015, only to lose it to Mio Shirai on June 7. On December 11, 2016, following Dynamite Kansai's retirement, Akino officially signed with Oz Academy, ending her days as a freelancer.

== Championships and accomplishments ==
- All Japan Women's Pro-Wrestling
  - All Pacific Championship (1 time)
- Arsion
  - Sky High of Arsion Championship (2 times)
  - Twin Star of Arsion Championship (1 time) – with Ayako Hamada
- JWP Joshi Puroresu
  - JWP Tag Team Championship (1 time) – with Tsubasa Kuragaki
- Oz Academy
  - Oz Academy Openweight Championship (2 times)
  - Oz Academy Pioneer 3-Way Championship (2 times)
  - Oz Academy Tag Team Championship (5 times) – with Ayumi Kurihara (1), Kaho Kobayashi (1), Ran Yu-Yu (2) and Sonoko Kato (1)
  - First Triple Crown Champion
  - Best Wizard Award (8 times)
    - Best Bout Award (2014) vs. Tsubasa Kuragaki on October 13
    - Best Bout Award (2015) with Sonoko Kato and Tsubasa Kuragaki vs. Arisa Nakajima, Hikaru Shida and Hiroyo Matsumoto on August 23
    - Best Bout Award (2017) with Kaho Kobayashi vs. Maya Yukihi and Mayumi Ozaki on October 29
    - Best Bout Award (2022) vs. Mayumi Ozaki on December 30
    - Best Tag Team Match Award (2012) with Ayumi Kurihara vs. Aja Kong and Sonoko Kato on August 19
    - MVP Award (2013, 2022, 2023)
