= Miho Wakizawa =

Japanese professional wrestler

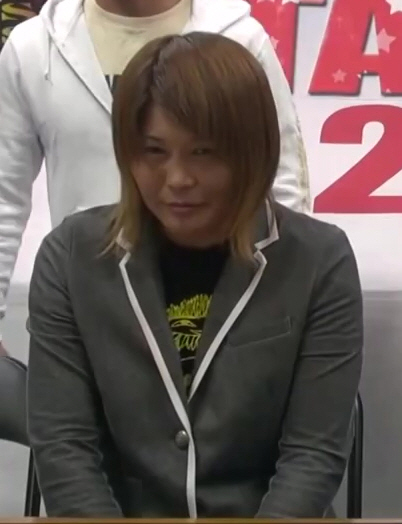
- Wakizawa in December 2014

Personal information
- Born: October 9, 1979 (age 46) Chiba, Japan

Professional wrestling career
- Ring name(s): Miho Wakizawa; Busu
- Billed height: 164 cm (5 ft 5 in)
- Billed weight: 64 kg (141 lb)
- Trained by: Kaoru Itō
- Debut: 1996
- Retired: 2014

Miho Wakizawa (脇沢美穂, Wakizawa Miho) is a Japanese retired professional wrestler best known for her time in the Japanese promotions World Wonder Ring Stardom and All Japan Women's Pro-Wrestling.

== Professional wrestling career ==
=== Independent circuit (1996-2014) ===
Wakizawa made some freelancer work by competing in multiple promotions. At JWP Listen !!, an event promoted by JWP Joshi Puroresu on June 13, 1999, she teamed up with Kayo Noumi to defeat Tsubasa Kuragaki and Kayoko Haruyama. At DDT Dramatic May Special, an event promoted by DDT Pro Wrestling on May 20, 2012, she teamed up with Michael Nakazawa to defeat Sanshiro Takagi and Soma Takao. At Gatoh Move Japan Tour #79, an event promoted by Gatoh Move Pro Wrestling on December 27, 2013, she wrestled Hiroshi Fukuda into a no-contest.

==== All Japan Women's Pro-Wrestling (1996-2001) ====
Wakizawa made her professional wrestling debut in the twelfth night of All Japan Women's Pro-Wrestling's Japan Grand Prix on July 28, 1996 where she wrestled Yachiyo Kawamoto in a time-limit draw.

She is known for competing in various of the promotion's signature events. One of them is the Japan Grand Prix, making her first appearance in the 1998 edition, placing herself in the Junior Block which she won with a total of twelve points after competing against Emi Motokawa, Momoe Nakawaki, Nanae Takahashi, Noriko Toyoda and ZAP Nakahara in the first stages and the fell short to Kaoru Ito in the semi-finals. One year later at the 1999 edition of the event, she scored only five points in the single block which also featured Yumiko Hotta, Takako Inoue and Tomoko Watanabe.

==== World Wonder Ring Stardom (2011-2014) ====
Wakizawa made her debut on World Wonder Ring Stardom at Stardom Year End Stars 2011 on December 25 where she fell short to Nanae Takahashi. On July 15, 2013 at Chapter Two Beginning, Wakizawa teamed up with Takahashi as "NanaMiho" to defeat Kawasaki Katsushika Saikyou Densetsu (Natsuki☆Taiyo and Yoshiko) in the finals of a four-team tournament to win the vacant Goddesses of Stardom Championship. She was part of the "Tawashis" stable, winning the Artist of Stardom Championship with her fellow stablemates Hiroyo Matsumoto and Mayu Iwatani on December 29, 2013 after defeating Kimura Monster-gun (Alpha Female, The Female Predator Amazon and Kyoko Kimura) at Stardom Yearend Climax 2013. At Stardom Queen Tradition on November 3, 2014, Wakizawa unsuccessfully challenged Mayu Iwatani for the Wonder of Stardom Championship. At Stardom Year-End Climax 2014, Wakizawa had her retirement match, a six-person tag team bout in which she teamed up with Genki Horiguchi and Manami Toyota in a losing effort to Io Shirai, Masaaki Mochizuki and Mayu Iwatani.

Wakizawa is known for competing in various of the promotion's signature events such as the Goddesses of Stardom Tag League. At the 2014 edition of the event, she teamed up with Koguma, placing themselves in the Blue Block and scoring a total of two points after competing against Hatsuhinode Kamen and Kaori Yoneyama, Io Shirai and Mayu Iwatani, and Star Fire and Mystique.

Wakizawa came out of retirement for one time at Stardom All Star Dream Cinderella on March 3, 2021 to compete in a 24-women Stardom All Star Rumble also involving returning wrestlers such as Yoko Bito, Yuzuki Aikawa, Chigusa Nagayo, Mima Shimoda and then current Stardom wrestlers like Bea Priestley, Mina Shirakawa, Unagi Sayaka, Starlight Kid and others.

== Championships and accomplishments ==
- All Japan Women's Pro-Wrestling
  - AJW Championship (1 time)
  - AJW Tag Team Championship (3 times) – with Kayo Noumi
  - Tag League the Best (1999) – with Manami Toyota
  - Junior Grand Prix (1998)
- World Wonder Ring Stardom
  - Artist of Stardom Championship (1 time) – with Hiroyo Matsumoto and Mayu Iwatani
  - Goddesses of Stardom Championship (1 time) – with Nanae Takahashi
  - Stardom Year-End Award (3 times)
    - Best Tag Team Award (2013) with Nanae Takahashi
    - Fighting Spirit Award (2012)
    - Special Merit Award (2014)
