= Tag League the Best =

Annual professional wrestling tag team tournament

The Tag League the Best (タッグリーグ・ザ・ベスト, Taggu Rīgu Za Besuto) was an annual professional wrestling tag team tournament, founded by All Japan Women's Pro-Wrestling (AJW), which held it from 1985 to 2004 (with no tournament taking place in 1990). After the folding of AJW in 2005, the tournament was adopted by its one-time rival and later associate promotion, JWP Joshi Puroresu, which held it annually from 2011 to 2016.

The tournament is usually held under round-robin rules with only the 2004 and 2016 tournaments having been held in a single-elimination format. The tournament's points system has varied throughout the years. From 1985 to 1992, a win was worth one point, a draw half a point and a loss zero points. From 1993 onwards a win has been worth two points, a draw one point and a loss zero points. When JWP took over promoting the tournament in 2011, it was moved to the beginning of the year from its usual position at the end of the year. JWP was also the first to introduce two round-robin blocks in the tournament instead of the usual single block system used by AJW. In AJW, the winners usually received a shot at the WWWA World Tag Team Championship, were they not already the reigning champions, while in JWP the tournament was used to determine the number one contenders to the unified Daily Sports Women's and JWP Tag Team Championships.

Due to the tournament's unusual name, it has sometimes been referred to as "The Best Tag (Team) League" by English language reporters, however, the tournament's Japanese promoters have always called it "Tag League the Best".

Manami Toyota holds the record for most Tag League the Best wins with five, all with different partners. No tag team has been able to win the tournament twice. Madusa Miceli is the only non-Japanese wrestler to be part of a winning team in the tournament.

== List of winners ==
- 1985: Bull Nakano and Dump Matsumoto
- 1986: Chigusa Nagayo and Yumiko Hotta
- 1987: Chigusa Nagayo and Lioness Asuka
- 1988: Hisako Uno and Mika Suzuki
- 1989: Madusa Miceli and Mitsuko Nishiwaki
- 1991: Kyoko Inoue and Toshiyo Yamada
- 1992: Aja Kong and Kyoko Inoue
- 1993: Akira Hokuto and Manami Toyota
- 1994: Manami Toyota and Takako Inoue
- 1995: Kyoko Inoue and Tomoko Watanabe
- 1996: Manami Toyota and Rie Tamada
- 1997: Kaoru Ito and Yumiko Hotta
- 1998: Momoe Nakanishi and Nanae Takahashi
- 1999: Manami Toyota and Miho Wakizawa
- 2000: Etsuko Mita and Mima Shimoda
- 2001: Manami Toyota and Yumiko Hotta
- 2002: Kayo Noumi and Momoe Nakanishi
- 2003: Ayako Hamada and Nanae Takahashi
- 2004: Kumiko Maekawa and Saki Maemura
- 2011: Kayoko Haruyama and Tsubasa Kuragaki
- 2012: Ran Yu-Yu and Toshie Uematsu
- 2013: Dash Chisako and Sendai Sachiko
- 2014: Rabbit Miu and Tsukushi
- 2015: Aoi Kizuki and Kayoko Haruyama
- 2016: Hanako Nakamori and Makoto

== 1985 ==
The first Tag League the Best was held in late 1985, with the finals taking place on October 10. The tournament featured eight teams in a single block, facing each other in a round-robin tournament. After the round-robin section was finished, the top team qualified straight to the final match, while teams placed second and third were put in a semifinal match to determine the other finalist.

Final standings
Wrestlers	Score
Chigusa Nagayo and Lioness Asuka (Crush Gals)	6.0
Itsuki Yamazaki and Noriyo Tateno (Jumping Bomb Angels)	5.0
Bull Nakano and Dump Matsumoto (Gokuaku Domei)	5.0
Jaguar Yokota and Yukari Omori	4.0
Devil Masami and Jumbo Hori	3.5
Monica Castillo and Monster Ripper	2.5
Mika Komatsu and Yumi Ogura	2.0
Kanako Nagatomo and Kazue Nagahori	0.0

Semifinal		Final
		1	Nagayo and Asuka
2	Yamazaki and Tateno	3	Nakano and Matsumoto
3	Nakano and Matsumoto

== 1986 ==
The second Tag League the Best was held at the end of 1986, with the finals taking place on October 10, 1986. This year, the two top teams following the round-robin portion advanced directly to the finals of the tournament, with no semifinal matches taking place.

Final standings
Wrestlers	Score
Chigusa Nagayo and Yumiko Hotta	6.5
Hisako Uno and Yukari Omori	6.5
Itsuki Yamazaki and Noriyo Tateno (Jumping Bomb Angels)	6.0
Bull Nakano and Condor Saito (Gokuaku Domei)	6.0
Devil Masami and Kyoko Asa	5.5
Kazue Nagahori and Yumi Ogura (Red Typhoons)	5.0
Dump Matsumoto and Yasuko Ishigura	4.0
Kanako Nagatomo and Mika Komatsu (Operon Domei)	3.5
Judy Martin and Velvet McIntyre	2.0
Lioness Asuka and Mika Suzuki	0.0

Final
1	Nagayo and Hotta
2	Uno and Omori

== 1987 ==
The third Tag League the Best culminated in a final match on October 11, 1987. For the second year in a row, there were no semifinal matches; the two top teams following the round-robin portion took part in a final match.

Final standings
Wrestlers	Score
Chigusa Nagayo and Lioness Asuka (Crush Gals)	7.0
Bull Nakano and Condor Saito (Gokuaku Domei)	7.0
Itsuki Yamazaki and Noriyo Tateno (Jumping Bomb Angels)	6.0
Angel Manelli and Leilani Kai	6.0
Devil Masami and Yukari Omori	5.5
Kazue Nagahori and Yumi Ogura (Red Typhoons)	4.0
Dump Matsumoto and Kage Kahoru	3.5
Mika Suzuki and Yumiko Hotta	2.5
Mika Komatsu and Yasuko Ishigura	2.0
Drill Nakamae and Kumiko Iwamoto	1.5

Final
1	Nagayo and Asuka
2	Nakano and Saito

== 1988 ==
The fourth Tag League the Best ran in late 1988 and culminated in a final match on October 10. The top team following the round-robin portion of the tournament moved directly to the finals, while teams number two and three faced off in a semifinal match.

Final standings
Wrestlers	Score
Mitsuko Nishiwaki and Yumiko Hotta (Fire Jets)	7.5
Hisako Uno and Mika Suzuki	7.0
Bull Nakano and Dynamite Jack (Gokumon To)	7.0
Mika Komatsu and Yumi Ogura (Calgary Typhoons)	6.5
Itsuki Yamazaki and Noriyo Tateno (Jumping Bomb Angels)	6.0
Manami Toyota and Toshiyo Yamada	5.5
Dynamite King and Dynamite Queen	5.5
Kumiko Iwamoto and Sachiko Nakamura	4.0
Erika Shishido and Nobuko Kimura	2.5
Kaoru Maeda and Mika Takahashi (Honey Wings)	2.0
Miori Kamiya and Raven Amada	1.5

Semifinal		Final
		1	Nishiwaki and Hotta
2	Uno and Suzuki	2	Uno and Suzuki
3	Nakano and Jack

== 1989 ==
The fifth Tag League the Best was held in late 1989 and culminated in a final match on October 8. This tournament was the first two introduce two semifinal matches, with the top four teams qualifying following the round-robin portion.

Final standings
Wrestlers	Score
Madusa Miceli and Mitsuko Nishiwaki	6.0
Manami Toyota and Toshiyo Yamada	6.0
Raven Amada and Yumiko Hotta	6.0
Akira Hokuto and Etsuko Mita	6.0
Beastie and Bull Nakano	6.0
Bison Kimura and Grizzly Iwamoto (The Outsiders)	5.5
Mima Shimoda and Suzuka Minami	4.5
Hiromi Hasegawa and Noriyo Tateno	4.0
Kaoru Maeda and Mika Takahashi (Honey Wings)	0.5
Aja Shishido and Miori Kamiya	0.5

Semifinals
1	Miceli and Nishiwaki
3	Amada and Hotta
2	Toyota and Yamada
4	Hokuto and Mita

Final
1	Miceli and Nishiwaki
2	Toyota and Yamada

== 1991 ==
After no tournament was held in 1990, Tag League the Best returned in 1991 taking place between October 4 and December 8.

Final standings
Wrestlers	Score
Kyoko Inoue and Toshiyo Yamada	5.5
Aja Kong and Bison Kimura (Jungle Jack)	4.5
Akira Hokuto and Bull Nakano	4.5
Bat Yoshinaga and Yumiko Hotta	3.5
Debbie Malenko and Suzuka Minami	3.0
Mariko Yoshida and Takako Inoue	3.0
Etsuko Mita and Manami Toyota (Mint Showers)	3.0
Mima Shimoda and Miori Kamiya	1.0

Semifinal		Final
		1	Inoue and Yamada
2	Kong and Kimura	2	Kong and Kimura
3	Hokuto and Nakano

== 1992 ==
The seventh Tag League the Best was held between October 17 and December 13, 1992. This was the final tournament to feature half points. The two top teams following the round-robin portion qualified directly to the semifinals.

Final standings
Wrestlers	Score
Aja Kong and Kyoko Inoue	6.5
Manami Toyota and Toshiyo Yamada	6.0
Debbie Malenko and Sakie Hasegawa	5.5
Suzuka Minami and Yumiko Hotta	5.0
Takako Inoue and Terri Power	4.0
Bat Yoshinaga and Tomoko Watanabe	3.0
Etsuko Mita and Mima Shimoda (Las Cachorras Orientales)	3.0
Miori Kamiya and Kaoru Ito	2.5
Erica Tsuchiya and Yukari Maedomari	1.0

Final
1	Kong and Inoue
2	Toyota and Yamada

== 1993 ==
The eighth Tag League the Best was held between October 10 and December 10, with a final match taking place between the two top teams.

Notably, the final point-determining match of the League ended in a tie for the top two placements. So was immediately followed up with a sudden-death rematch for the "final". Both matches received a 5-star rating from the Wrestling Observer Newsletter.

Final standings
Wrestlers	Score
Kyoko Inoue and Toshiyo Yamada	10
Akira Hokuto and Manami Toyota	10
Eagle Sawai and Yasha Kurenai	8
Takako Inoue and Yumiko Hotta	8
Bull Nakano and Suzuka Minami	8
Aja Kong and Sakie Hasegawa	8
Etsuko Mita and Mima Shimoda (Las Cachorras Orientales)	4
Kaoru Ito and Tomoko Watanabe	0

Final
1	Inoue and Yamada
2	Hokuto and Toyota

== 1994 ==
The ninth Tag League the Best was held between October 8 and December 10, 1994. Due to a three-way tie following the round-robin portion of the tournament, the top three teams faced each other once more to determine the winner. Manami Toyota and Takako Inoue prevailed, defeating both Aja Kong and Reggie Bennett, and Kyoko Inoue and Sakie Hasegawa, while Kong and Bennett were able to win only one of the tiebreaker matches and Inoue and Hasegawa lost both.

Final standings
Wrestlers	Score
Manami Toyota and Takako Inoue	10
Aja Kong and Reggie Bennett	10
Kyoko Inoue and Sakie Hasegawa	10
Etsuko Mita and Mima Shimoda (Las Cachorras Orientales)	9
Toshiyo Yamada and Yumiko Hotta	9
Kaoru Ito and Suzuka Minami	5
Rie Tamada and Tomoko Watanabe	2
Chaparita Asari and Mariko Yoshida	1

== 1995 ==
The tenth Tag League the Best ran between October 10 and December 10, 1995, and was the first and thus far only tournament to feature a match for the third place in the tournament.

Final standings
Wrestlers	Score
Kyoko Inoue and Tomoko Watanabe	10
Kaoru Ito and Manami Toyota	10
Reggie Bennett and Yumiko Hotta	9
Aja Kong and Takako Inoue	9
Akira Hokuto and Mima Shimoda	8
Etsuko Mita and Toshiyo Yamada (Dream Orca)	6
Mariko Yoshida and Sakie Hasegawa	4
Chaparita Asari and Yoshiko Tamura	0

Final
1	K. Inoue and Watanabe	Pin
2	Ito and Toyota	22:01

Third Place
3	Bennett and Hotta	Pin
4	Kong and T. Inoue	16:54

== 1996 ==
The eleventh Tag League the Best was held between October 13 and December 1, 1996. For the first time in five years, the tournament featured semifinal matches, with the top four teams qualifying for advancement following the round-robin portion.

Final standings
Wrestlers	Score
Chaparita Asari and Kyoko Inoue	15
Mima Shimoda and Reggie Bennett	14
Kumiko Maekawa and Tomoko Watanabe	12
Manami Toyota and Rie Tamada	9
Aja Kong and Yoshiko Tamura	8
Yuka Shiina and Yumiko Hotta	8
Etsuko Mita and Misae Genki	6
Saya Endo and Toshiyo Yamada	6
Takako Inoue and Yumi Fukawa	N/A
Kaoru Ito and Mariko Yoshida	N/A

Semifinals
1	Asari and Inoue
4	Toyota and Tamada
2	Shimoda and Bennett
3	Maekawa and Watanabe

Final
4	Toyota and Tamada
3	Maekawa and Watanabe

== 1997 ==
The twelfth Tag League the Best took place in late 1997 and culminated in a final match on December 21. No semifinal matches took place.

Final standings
Wrestlers	Score
Kaoru Ito and Yumiko Hotta	N/A
Kumiko Maekawa and Takako Inoue	N/A
Emi Motokawa and Manami Toyota	N/A
Kayo Noumi and Momoe Nakanishi	N/A
Miho Wakizawa and Miyuki Fujii	N/A

Final
1	Ito and Hotta
2	Maekawa and Inoue

== 1998 ==
The thirteenth Tag League the Best took place between October 10 and November 22, 1998, again with no semifinal matches.

Final standings
Wrestlers	Score
Momoe Nakanishi and Nanae Takahashi (Nana☆Momo☆)	10
Manami Toyota and Yumiko Hotta	9
Zap I and Zap T (ZAP)	9
Kayo Noumi and Miho Wakizawa	6
Emi Motokawa and Sachie Noshibori	2
Mayumi Takahashi and Miyuki Fujii	0
Kumiko Maekawa and Mika Haikae	0

== 1999 ==
The fourteenth Tag League the Best was held between October 10 and December 26, 1999. For the first time in eight years, the tournament featured a single semifinal match between teams ranked two and three following the round-robin portion, while the top team qualified directly to the finals.

Final standings
Wrestlers	Score
Kumiko Maekawa and Tomoko Watanabe	5
Manami Toyota and Miho Wakizawa	5
Momoe Nakanishi and Nanae Takahashi (Nana☆Momo☆)	5
Kaoru Ito and Kayo Noumi	3
Miyuki Fujii and Yumiko Hotta	2

Semifinal			Final
			1	Maekawa and Watanabe	Pin
2	Toyota and Wakizawa	Pin	2	Toyota and Wakizawa	1:41
3	Takahashi (Note: Momoe Nakanishi had suffered an injury and was unable to take part in the semifinal match, leaving Takahashi to wrestle alone.)	4:47

== 2000 ==
The fifteenth Tag League the Best was held between October 15 and December 23, 2000. The winners of the tournament, Etsuko Mita and Mima Shimoda, went on to defeat Momoe Nakanishi and Nanae Takahashi for the WWWA World Tag Team Championship on January 4, 2001.

Final standings
Wrestlers	Score
Etsuko Mita and Mima Shimoda (Las Cachorras Orientales)	7
Kayo Noumi and Manami Toyota	7
Momoe Nakanishi and Nanae Takahashi (Nana☆Momo☆)	6
Carol Midori and Sayuri Okina	6
Kaoru Ito and Miho Wakizawa	4
Kumiko Maekawa and Tomoko Watanabe	0

Results	Midori Okina	Mita Shimoda	Ito Wakizawa	Noumi Toyota	Maekawa Watanabe	Nakanishi Takahashi
Midori Okina	—N/a	Mita; Shimoda (17:21)	Midori; Okina (19:56)	Midori; Okina (20:22)	Midori; Okina (forfeit)	Nakanishi; Takahashi (17:07)
Mita Shimoda	Mita; Shimoda (17:21)	—N/a	Mita; Shimoda (19:26)	Noumi; Toyota (19:13)	Mita; Shimoda (8:26)	Draw (30:00)
Ito Wakizawa	Midori; Okina (19:56)	Mita; Shimoda (19:26)	—N/a	Noumi; Toyota (19:42)	Ito; Wakizawa (forfeit)	Ito; Wakizawa (20:49)
Noumi Toyota	Midori; Okina (20:22)	Noumi; Toyota (19:13)	Noumi; Toyota (19:42)	—N/a	Noumi; Toyota (forfeit)	Draw (30:00)
Maekawa Watanabe	Midori; Okina (forfeit)	Mita; Shimoda (8:26)	Ito; Wakizawa (forfeit)	Noumi; Toyota (forfeit)	—N/a	Nakanishi; Takahashi (forfeit)
Nakanishi Takahashi	Nakanishi; Takahashi (17:07)	Draw (30:00)	Ito; Wakizawa (20:49)	Draw (30:00)	Nakanishi; Takahashi (forfeit)	—N/a

Final
1	Mita and Shimoda	Pin
2	Noumi and Toyota	13:33

== 2001 ==
The sixteenth Tag League the Best was held between September 23 and December 2, 2001.

Final standings
Wrestlers	Score
Manami Toyota and Yumiko Hotta	6
Kaoru Ito and Momoe Nakanishi	6
Etsuko Mita and Mima Shimoda (Las Cachorras Orientales)	5
Kumiko Maekawa and Misae Genki	5
Kayo Noumi and Miho Wakizawa (Kiss no Sekai)	4
Nanae Takahashi and Tomoko Watanabe	4

Results	Mita Shimoda	Ito Nakanishi	Noumi Wakizawa	Maekawa Genki	Toyota Hotta	Takahashi Watanabe
Mita Shimoda	—N/a	Ito; Nakanishi (18:01)	Mita; Shimoda (18:32)	Draw (30:00)	Toyota; Hotta (7:40)	Mita; Shimoda (23:45)
Ito Nakanishi	Ito; Nakanishi (18:01)	—N/a	Ito; Nakanishi (19:05)	Maekawa; Genki (20:03)	Toyota; Hotta (18:39)	Ito; Nakanishi (20:06)
Noumi Wakizawa	Mita; Shimoda (18:32)	Ito; Nakanishi (19:05)	—N/a	Noumi; Wakizawa (23:05)	Noumi; Wakizawa (14:59)	Takahashi; Watanabe (20:44)
Maekawa Genki	Draw (30:00)	Maekawa; Genki (20:03)	Noumi; Wakizawa (23:05)	—N/a	Maekawa; Genki (20:32)	Takahashi; Watanabe (22:33)
Toyota Hotta	Toyota; Hotta (7:40)	Toyota; Hotta (18:39)	Noumi; Wakizawa (14:59)	Maekawa; Genki (20:32)	—N/a	Toyota; Hotta (19:33)
Takahashi Watanabe	Mita; Shimoda (23:45)	Ito; Nakanishi (20:06)	Takahashi; Watanabe (20:44)	Takahashi; Watanabe (22:33)	Toyota; Hotta (19:33)	—N/a

Final
1	Toyota and Hotta	Pin
2	Ito and Nakanishi	17:03

== 2002 ==
The seventeenth Tag League the Best was held between October 15 and December 23, 2002, and saw the return of the two semifinal match format. While the tournament was ongoing, Etsuko Mita and Mima Shimoda defeated Momoe Nakanishi and Nanae Takahashi in a non-tournament match to win the WWWA World Tag Team Championship, however, their failure to win the tournament resulted in them relinquishing the title.

Final standings
Wrestlers	Score
Kayo Noumi and Momoe Nakanishi (Kiss no Sekai)	8
Takako Inoue and Tomoko Watanabe	8
Etsuko Mita and Mima Shimoda (Las Cachorras Orientales)	8
Fang Suzuki and Nanae Takahashi	8
Mariko Yoshida and Yumiko Hotta	8
Kumiko Maekawa and Misae Genki	7
Megumi Yabushita and Sumie Sakai	7
Mika Nishio and Miyuki Fujii	2

Results	Mita Shimoda	Suzuki Takahashi	Noumi Nakanishi	Maekawa Genki	Yoshida Hotta	Yabushita Sakai	Nishio Fujii	Inoue Watanabe
Mita Shimoda	—N/a	Mita; Shimoda (23:27)	Noumi; Nakanishi (25:15)	Mita; Shimoda	Yoshida; Hotta (17:52)	Mita; Shimoda	Mita; Shimoda	Inoue; Watanabe (9:26)
Suzuki Takahashi	Mita; Shimoda (23:27)	—N/a	Suzuki; Takahashi (21:01)	Suzuki; Takahashi (23:39)	Yoshida; Hotta (18:06)	Yabushita; Sakai (17:54)	Suzuki; Takahashi (19:40)	Suzuki; Takahashi (20:40)
Noumi Nakanishi	Noumi; Nakanishi (25:15)	Suzuki; Takahashi (21:01)	—N/a	Draw (30:00)	Noumi; Nakanishi (8:30)	Yabushita; Sakai	Noumi; Nakanishi	Draw (30:00)
Maekawa Genki	Mita; Shimoda	Suzuki; Takahashi (23:39)	Draw (30:00)	—N/a	Yoshida; Hotta (24:00)	Maekawa; Genki (20:44)	Maekawa; Genki	Maekawa; Genki (17:00)
Yoshida Hotta	Yoshida; Hotta (17:52)	Yoshida; Hotta (18:06)	Noumi; Nakanishi (8:30)	Yoshida; Hotta (24:00)	—N/a	Yoshida; Hotta (17:03)	Nishio; Fujii	Inoue; Watanabe (5:33)
Yabushita Sakai	Mita; Shimoda	Yabushita; Sakai (17:54)	Yabushita; Sakai	Maekawa; Genki (20:44)	Yoshida; Hotta (17:03)	—N/a	Yabushita; Sakai (12:51)	Draw (30:00)
Nishio Fujii	Mita; Shimoda	Suzuki; Takahashi (19:40)	Noumi; Nakanishi	Maekawa; Genki	Nishio; Fujii	Yabushita; Sakai (12:51)	—N/a	Inoue; Watanabe (12:33)
Inoue Watanabe	Inoue; Watanabe (9:26)	Suzuki; Takahashi (20:40)	Draw (30:00)	Maekawa; Genki (17:00)	Inoue; Watanabe (5:33)	Draw (30:00)	Inoue; Watanabe (12:33)	—N/a

Semifinals
1	Noumi and Nakanishi	Pin
3	Mita and Shimoda	4:31
2	Inoue and Watanabe	Pin
4	Suzuki and Takahashi

Final
1	Noumi and Nakanishi	Pin
2	Inoue and Watanabe	4:19

== 2003 ==
The eighteenth Tag League the Best was held between November 2 and December 23, 2003, again with two semifinal matches between the top four teams. The winners of the tournament, Ayako Hamada and Nanae Takahashi, went on to defeat Kyoko Inoue and Takako Inoue for the WWWA World Tag Team Championship on January 3, 2004.

Final standings
Wrestlers	Score
Ayako Hamada and Nanae Takahashi	6
Amazing Kong and Eagle Sakai	6
Kumiko Maekawa and Saki Maemura	6
Kayo Noumi and Takako Inoue	6
Hikaru and Kyoko Inoue	4
Fang Suzuki and Sasori	2

Results	Kong Sakai	Hamada Takahashi	Suzuki Sasori	Hikaru K. Inoue	Noumi T. Inoue	Maekawa Maemura
Kong Sakai	—N/a	Kong; Sakai (11:18)	Kong; Sakai (18:19)	Kong; Sakai (15:03)	Noumi; T.Inoue (11:57)	Maekawa; Maemura (17:59)
Hamada Takahashi	Kong; Sakai (11:18)	—N/a	Hamada; Takahashi (24:01)	Hamada; Takahashi (16:52)	Noumi; T.Inoue (20:43)	Hamada; Takahashi (23:37)
Suzuki Sasori	Kong; Sakai (18:19)	Hamada; Takahashi (24:01)	—N/a	Hikaru; K. Inoue (11:44)	Noumi; T.Inoue (18:31)	Suzuki; Sasori (18:17)
Hikaru K. Inoue	Kong; Sakai (15:03)	Hamada; Takahashi (16:52)	Hikaru; K. Inoue (11:44)	—N/a	Hikaru; K. Inoue (20:01)	Maekawa; Maemura (20:52)
Noumi T. Inoue	Noumi; T.Inoue (11:57)	Noumi; T.Inoue (20:43)	Noumi; T.Inoue (18:31)	Hikaru; K. Inoue (20:01)	—N/a	Maekawa; Maemura (18:50)
Maekawa Maemura	Maekawa; Maemura (17:59)	Hamada; Takahashi (23:37)	Suzuki; Sasori (18:17)	Maekawa; Maemura (20:52)	Maekawa; Maemura (18:50)	—N/a

Semifinals
1	Hamada and Takahashi	Pin
4	Noumi and Inoue	3:42
2	Kong and Sakai	Pin
3	Maekawa and Maemura	4:46

Final
1	Hamada and Takahashi	Pin
2	Kong and Sakai	8:31

== 2004 ==
The 2004 version of the Tag League the Best, the final one held by AJW, was also the first tournament contested in a single-elimination format between December 4 and 26.

Quarterfinals
Kumiko Maekawa; Saki Maemura	Pin
Maruka Matsuo; Misae Genki	19:30
Ran Yu-Yu; Toshie Uematsu (Uematsu☆Ran)	Pin
Hikaru; Nanae Takahashi	18:05
The Bloody; Fang Suzuki	DQ
Dump Matsumoto; Sasori	10:41
Emi Tojo; Tomoko Watanabe	Pin
Kana; Yumiko Hotta	14:31

Semifinals
Kumiko Maekawa; Saki Maemura	Pin
Ran Yu-Yu; Toshie Uematsu	10:03
The Bloody; Fang Suzuki	Pin
Kana; Yumiko Hotta	14:32

Final
Kumiko Maekawa; Saki Maemura	Pin
Kana; Yumiko Hotta	21:14

== 2011 ==
Following the folding of AJW in 2005, Tag League the Best was dead for six years, before being picked up by JWP, which held its first tournament, overall the twentieth, between January 16 and March 6, 2011. The tournament featured eight teams split between two blocks, dubbed "Blue Zone" and "Red Zone". Due to a three-way tie at the top of the Blue Zone, February 20 saw two matches taking place between the three teams to determine who would get to face the winner of the Red Zone in the finals. During the opening day of the tournament, Kayoko Haruyama and Tsubasa Kuragaki put their Daily Sports Women's Tag Team Championship on the line in their match against Hailey Hatred and Kaori Yoneyama. Haruyama and Kuragaki entered the tournament as not only the Daily Sports Women's Tag Team Champions, but also as the JWP Tag Team Champions, and as they were able to win the tournament it did not result in any direct title matches.

Final standings
Blue Zone		Red Zone	
Leon and Misaki Ohata (Shishi no Ana)	4	Kayoko Haruyama and Tsubasa Kuragaki (Harukura)	6
Kazuki and Sachie Abe (The☆Wanted!?)	4	Hailey Hatred and Kaori Yoneyama (Queens Revolution)	4
Aoi Yagami and Command Bolshoi (Rainbow Dragon)	4	Hanako Nakamori and Tomoko Morii (Dog Lock Be)	2
masu-me and Tsukasa Fujimoto (Cutie Pair)	0	Sakura Hirota and Senri Kuroki (Hiroki)	0

Blue Zone	Yagami Bolshoi	Kazuki Abe	Leon Ohata	masu-me Fujimoto
Yagami Bolshoi	—N/a	Kazuki; Abe (15:29)	Yagami; Bolshoi (7:35)	Yagami; Bolshoi (8:24)
Kazuki Abe	Kazuki; Abe (15:29)	—N/a	Leon; Ohata (16:44)	Kazuki; Abe (10:21)
Leon Ohata	Yagami; Bolshoi (7:35)	Leon; Ohata (16:44)	—N/a	Leon; Ohata (9:52)
masu-me Fujimoto	Yagami; Bolshoi (8:24)	Kazuki; Abe (10:21)	Leon; Ohata (9:52)	—N/a
Red Zone	Hatred Yoneyama	Nakamori Morii	Haruyama Kuragaki	Hirota Kuroki
Hatred Yoneyama	—N/a	Hatred; Yoneyama (12:46)	Haruyama; Kuragaki (20:43)	Hatred; Yoneyama (13:44)
Nakamori Morii	Hatred; Yoneyama (12:46)	—N/a	Haruyama; Kuragaki (12:53)	Nakamori; Morii (16:33)
Haruyama Kuragaki	Haruyama; Kuragaki (20:43)	Haruyama; Kuragaki (12:53)	—N/a	Haruyama; Kuragaki (17:01)
Hirota Kuroki	Hatred; Yoneyama (13:44)	Nakamori; Morii (16:33)	Haruyama; Kuragaki (17:01)	—N/a

Finalist Decision Match #1
BZ1	Leon and Ohata	Pin
BZ3	Yagami and Bolshoi	4:15

Finalist Decision Match #2
BZ1	Leon and Ohata	Pin
BZ2	Kazuki and Abe	7:26

Final
BZ1	Leon and Ohata	Pin
RZ1	Haruyama and Kuragaki	21:59

== 2012 ==
The twenty-first Tag League the Best was held between January 9 and April 8, 2012, and was contested for the Daily Sports Women's and JWP Tag Team Championships, which were taken off Hailey Hatred and Kaori Yoneyama on January 9 as punishment for Yoneyama going back on her claim to retire at the end of 2011. Moon Mizuki was injured mid-tournament; as a result, she and her partner Manami Katsu were forced to forfeit their last two matches.

Final standings
Blue Zone		Red Zone	
Hanako Nakamori and Misaki Ohata (Labradorite)	6	Ran Yu-Yu and Toshie Uematsu (Uematsu☆Ran)	8
Kazuki and Morii (The☆Wanted!?)	5	Kayoko Haruyama and Tsubasa Kuragaki (Harukura)	6
Leon and Ray (Mascara Voladoras)	5	Command Bolshoi and Rabbit Miu (Pikorabi)	4
Cherry and Sachie Abe (Shishun Kiizu)	4	Dash Chisako and Sendai Sachiko (Jumonji Sisters)	2
Mochi Miyagi and Nana Kawasa (Mocchi 7)	0	Manami Katsu and Moon Mizuki (Tsuki no Ue no Poyo)	0

Blue Zone	Cherry Abe	Nakamori Ohata	Kazuki Morii	Leon Ray	Miyagi Kawasa
Cherry Abe	—N/a	Cherry; Abe (9:07)	Kazuki; Morii (12:43)	Leon; Ray (18:52)	Cherry; Abe (11:20)
Nakamori Ohata	Cherry; Abe (9:07)	—N/a	Nakamori; Ohata (11:24)	Nakamori; Ohata (18:40)	Nakamori; Ohata (11:32)
Kazuki Morii	Kazuki; Morii (12:43)	Nakamori; Ohata (11:24)	—N/a	Draw (20:00)	Kazuki; Morii (11:00)
Leon Ray	Leon; Ray (18:52)	Nakamori; Ohata (18:40)	Draw (20:00)	—N/a	Leon; Ray (11:40)
Miyagi Kawasa	Cherry; Abe (11:20)	Nakamori; Ohata (11:32)	Kazuki; Morii (11:00)	Leon; Ray (11:40)	—N/a
Red Zone	Bolshoi Miu	Chisako Sachiko	Haruyama Kuragaki	Katsu Mizuki	Yu-Yu Uematsu
Bolshoi Miu	—N/a	Chisako; Sachiko (13:05)	Haruyama; Kuragaki (9:12)	Bolshoi; Miu (9:32)	Yu-Yu; Uematsu (15:32)
Chisako Sachiko	Chisako; Sachiko (13:05)	—N/a	Haruyama; Kuragaki (15:21)	Chisako; Sachiko (10:48)	Yu-Yu; Uematsu (16:24)
Haruyama Kuragaki	Haruyama; Kuragaki (9:12)	Haruyama; Kuragaki (15:21)	—N/a	Haruyama; Kuragaki (forfeit)	Yu-Yu; Uematsu (18:44)
Katsu Mizuki	Bolshoi; Miu (9:32)	Chisako; Sachiko (10:48)	Haruyama; Kuragaki (forfeit)	—N/a	Yu-Yu; Uematsu (forfeit)
Yu-Yu Uematsu	Yu-Yu; Uematsu (15:32)	Yu-Yu; Uematsu (16:24)	Yu-Yu; Uematsu (18:44)	Yu-Yu; Uematsu (forfeit)	—N/a

Final
BZ1	Nakamori and Ohata	Pin
RZ1	Yu-Yu and Uematsu	20:19

== 2013 ==
The twenty-second Tag League the Best took place between February 17 and April 7, 2013, and was used to determine the number one contenders to the Daily Sports Women's and JWP Tag Team Championships, held by Kayoko Haruyama and Tsubasa Kuragaki.

Final standings
Block A		Block B	
Hanako Nakamori and Morii (Heart Move)	4	Dash Chisako and Sendai Sachiko (Jumonji Sisters)	3
Arisa Nakajima and Command Bolshoi (Aripiko)	2	Manami Katsu and Rabbit Miu (Manarabi)	2
Leon and Neko Nitta (Nekoka Tag)	0	Kazuki and Sachie Abe (The☆Wanted!?)	1

Block A	Nakajima Bolshoi	Nakamori Morii	Leon Nitta	Block B	Chisako Sachiko	Kazuki Abe	Katsu Miu
Nakajima Bolshoi	—N/a	Nakamori; Morii (13:21)	Nakajima; Bolshoi (13:59)	Chisako Sachiko	—N/a	Draw (12:29)	Chisako; Sachiko (13:17)
Nakamori Morii	Nakamori; Morii (13:21)	—N/a	Nakamori; Morii (12:36)	Kazuki Abe	Draw (12:29)	—N/a	Katsu; Miu (12:19)
Leon Nitta	Nakajima; Bolshoi (13:59)	Nakamori; Morii (12:36)	—N/a	Katsu Miu	Chisako; Sachiko (13:17)	Katsu; Miu (12:19)	—N/a

Final
A1	Nakamori and Morii	Pin
B1	Chisako and Sachiko	14:10

== 2014 ==
The twenty-third Tag League the Best took place between January 5 and March 16, 2014. Kayoko Haruyama and Manami Katsu originally won block B, but were forced to pull out of the final match after Katsu injured her left ankle while training, giving the spot in the finals to Leon and Ray, who had finished second in the block. The winners of the tournament were scheduled to challenge Dash Chisako and Sendai Sachiko for the Daily Sports Women's and JWP Tag Team Championships on April 20, but the match was canceled due to Sachiko suffering a knee injury.

Final standings
Block A		Block B	
Rabbit Miu and Tsukushi (Haruusagi)	4	Kayoko Haruyama and Manami Katsu (Spring☆Victory)	5
Arisa Nakajima and Kana	3	Leon and Ray (Mascara Voladoras)	4
Command Bolshoi and Kyoko Kimura	3	Hanako Nakamori and Takako Inoue	3
Kazuki and Rydeen Hagane (The☆Wanted!?)	2	Sachie Abe and Yako Fujigasaki	0

Block A	Nakajima Kana	Bolshoi Kimura	Kazuki Hagane	Miu Tsukushi	Block B	Nakamori Inoue	Haruyama Katsu	Leon Ray	Abe Fujigasaki
Nakajima Kana	—N/a	Draw (20:00)	Nakajima; Kana (13:57)	Miu; Tsukushi (14:38)	Nakamori Inoue	—N/a	Draw (20:00)	Leon; Ray (15:02)	Nakamori; Inoue (12:52)
Bolshoi Kimura	Draw (20:00)	—N/a	Kazuki; Hagane (14:21)	Bolshoi; Kimura (11:18)	Haruyama Katsu	Draw (20:00)	—N/a	Haruyama; Katsu (17:18)	Haruyama; Katsu (16:26)
Kazuki Hagane	Nakajima; Kana (13:57)	Kazuki; Hagane (14:21)	—N/a	Miu; Tsukushi (12:56)	Leon Ray	Leon; Ray (15:02)	Haruyama; Katsu (17:18)	—N/a	Leon; Ray (12:24)
Miu Tsukushi	Miu; Tsukushi (14:38)	Bolshoi; Kimura (11:18)	Miu; Tsukushi (12:56)	—N/a	Abe Fujigasaki	Nakamori; Inoue (12:52)	Haruyama; Katsu (16:26)	Leon; Ray (12:24)	—N/a

Final
A1	Miu and Tsukushi	Pin
B2	Leon and Ray	18:25

== 2015 ==
The twenty-fourth Tag League the Best took place between January 18 and March 22, 2015. Defending tournament winners Rabbit Miu and Tsukushi were forced to forfeit their opening match in the tournament on February 15, due to Miu being sidelined with dizziness. That same day, Hanako Nakamori suffered a knee injury, forcing her and Arisa Nakajima to forfeit their two remaining matches in the tournament.

Final standings
Block A		Block B	
Aoi Kizuki and Kayoko Haruyama (Orange Happies)	6	Command Bolshoi and Kyoko Kimura (Wild Snufkin)	6
Leon and Ray (Voladoras L×R)	4	Rabbit Miu and Tsukushi (Haruusagi)	2
Arisa Nakajima and Hanako Nakamori (Violence Princess)	2	Eri and Haruka Kato	2
Yako Fujigasaki and Yua Hayashi	0	Kazuki and Rydeen Hagane (Wanted '14)	2

Block A	Kizuki Haruyama	Nakajima Nakamori	Leon Ray	Fujigasaki Hayashi	Block B	Bolshoi Kimura	Eri Kato	Kazuki Hagane	Miu Tsukushi
Kizuki Haruyama	—N/a	Kizuki; Haruyama (forfeit)	Kizuki; Haruyama (18:23)	Kizuki; Haruyama (12:56)	Bolshoi Kimura	—N/a	Bolshoi; Kimura (16:06)	Bolshoi; Kimura (18:03)	Bolshoi; Kimura (forfeit)
Nakajima Nakamori	Kizuki; Haruyama (forfeit)	—N/a	Leon; Ray (forfeit)	Nakajima; Nakamori (15:50)	Eri Kato	Bolshoi; Kimura (16:06)	—N/a	Eri; Kato (17:33)	Miu; Tsukushi (13:59)
Leon Ray	Kizuki; Haruyama (18:23)	Leon; Ray (forfeit)	—N/a	Leon; Ray (14:49)	Kazuki Hagane	Bolshoi; Kimura (18:03)	Eri; Kato (17:33)	—N/a	Kazuki; Hagane (15:43)
Fujigasaki Hayashi	Kizuki; Haruyama (12:56)	Nakajima; Nakamori (15:50)	Leon; Ray (14:49)	—N/a	Miu Tsukushi	Bolshoi; Kimura (forfeit)	Miu; Tsukushi (13:59)	Kazuki; Hagane (15:43)	—N/a

Final
A1	Kizuki and Haruyama	Pin
B1	Bolshoi and Kimura	25:27

== 2016 ==
The 2016 version of the Tag League the Best was the second contested in a single-elimination format. Taking place between January 31 and February 21, the tournament was used to determine the number one contenders to the Daily Sports Women's and JWP Tag Team Championships, held by Best Friends (Arisa Nakajima and Tsukasa Fujimoto).

First round
Akane Fujita; Leon	Pin
Konami; Syuri	13:53
Kazuki; Rydeen Hagane (Wanted '14)	Pin
Meiko Tanaka; Sareee	14:26
Command Bolshoi; Rabbit Miu	Pin
Kagetsu; Sawako Shimono	13:25
Hanako Nakamori; Makoto (Makafushigi)	Pin
Hikaru Shida; Yako Fujigasaki	13:28

Semifinals
Konami; Syuri	Pin
Kazuki; Rydeen Hagane	10:24
Kagetsu; Sawako Shimono	Pin
Hanako Nakamori; Makoto	13:26

Final
Kazuki; Rydeen Hagane	Pin
Hanako Nakamori; Makoto	16:40

== See also ==
- All Japan Women's Pro-Wrestling
- JWP Joshi Puroresu
- Japan Grand Prix
- G1 Tag League
- World's Strongest Tag Determination League
