= Emiko Kado =

Japanese professional wrestler

Personal information
- Born: January 28, 1976 Osaka Prefecture, Japan
- Died: April 9, 1999 (aged 23) Fukuoka, Japan

Professional wrestling career
- Ring name: Emiko Kado
- Billed height: 1.65 m (5 ft 5 in)
- Billed weight: 61 kg (134 lb)
- Debut: February 18, 1999

Emiko Kado (門 恵美子, Kado Emiko) (January 28, 1976 – April 9, 1999) was a Japanese female professional wrestler. She died after a wrestling injury, only months into her professional career.

Kado's wrestling-related ring death was the second to occur in Japan. (The first was fellow joshi wrestler Plum Mariko.)

== Career ==
Kado had her first match in February, 1999 at the ARSION First Anniversary Show at Tokyo's Korakuen Hall in front of 1550 people, losing to Aja Kong. Kado went on to wrestle fourteen more matches in her short career, losing every one. In her last match, on March 31, 1999, she teamed up with Michiko Omukai to face the team of Mariko Yoshida and Mikiko Futagami. About 22 minutes into the match she suffered a serious injury from a blow to the head. Kado was rushed to a hospital in Fukuoka, where she died from intracerebral bleeding on April 9.

== See also ==
- List of premature professional wrestling deaths
