= DK =

DK (or variants) may refer to:

== In arts and entertainment ==
=== Film and television ===
- DK (film), a 2015 Indian film
- Derek "DK" Kitson, a character in the television series Third Watch, played by Derek Kelly
- Dark Kingdom (professional wrestling), a professional wrestling stable
- Discovery Kids, an American television network

=== Music ===
- DK (band), a Soviet rock band
- DK (singer), South Korean singer and member of Seventeen
- Deekay, a music production team
- Danity Kane, an American female music group
- Dave Koz, American saxophonist
- Dead Kennedys, American punk band

=== Other media ===
- Diddy Kong, a video game character
- Diels–Kranz numbering, a standard system for referencing the works of the pre-Socratic philosophers
- DistroKid, an American independent digital music service
- Dixie Kong, a video game character
- Donkey Kong (character), a video game character

== Businesses and organizations ==
- Dorling Kindersley, an international book publisher
- Democratic Coalition (Hungary), a political party in Hungary
- Design School Kolding (Danish: Designskolen Kolding)
- Digital Keystone, a technology company in Mountain View, California
- Digital Kitchen, a creative digital agency with offices in Seattle, Chicago, and Los Angeles
- Dravidar Kazhagam, a political party in India
- Eastland Air (1991-2003, IATA airline code DK), an Australian airline
- German Banking Industry Committee (German Die Deutsche Kreditwirtschaft)
- Sunclass Airlines (IATA airline code DK), a Danish airline
- Delek US, NYSE ticker symbol DK, a downstream energy company

== People ==
- DK Metcalf (born 1997), American football wide receiver
- Darryl Kile (1968–2002), American professional baseball pitcher
- Donna Karan (born 1948), fashion designer and creator of the DKNY label
- Dinesh Karthik (born 1985), Indian cricketer
- Keiichi Tsuchiya, known as the Drift King for his nontraditional use of drifting in non-drifting racing events and his role in popularizing drifting as a motorsport

== Places ==
- Denmark (ISO 3166-2 country code DK, licence plate code DK)
  - .dk, the country code top-level Internet domain for Denmark
- Dakshina Kannada, a district in Karnataka, India
- Democratic Kampuchea, name of present-day Cambodia from 1975 to 1979
- Dickinson County, Kansas, which uses the county code DK
- Dolný Kubín, a town in Slovakia and seat of the eponymous district which uses the code DK

== In science and technology ==
- Decikelvin (dK), an SI unit of thermodynamic temperature
- DK (automobile), a Danish automobile from the early 1950s
- Relative permittivity of a dielectric
- Diels–Kranz numbering

== Other uses ==
- Team DK, a defunct esports team
- Bali (vehicle registration prefix DK)

== See also ==
- Donkey Kong (disambiguation)
