= Twin Star of Arsion Championship =

Professional wrestling women's tag team championship

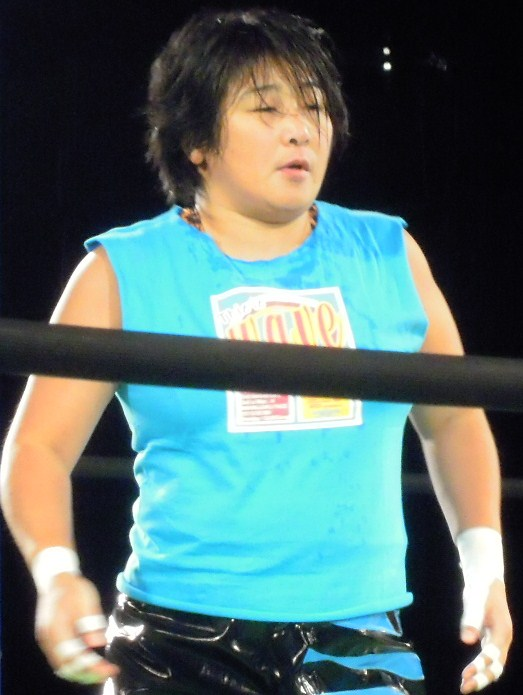
- Gami, who held the Twin Star of Arsion Championship four times

Details
- Promotion: Hyper Visual Fighting Arsion
- Date established: December 7, 1998
- Date retired: June 22, 2003
Statistics
- First champions: Hiromi Yagi and Rie Tamada
- Final champions: Rie Tamada and Takako Inoue
- Most reigns: As a team (2 reigns): Gami and Lioness Asuka; Gami and Rie Tamada; As an individual (4 reigns): Gami; Rie Tamada
- Longest reign: Las Cachorras Orientales (Etsuko Mita and Mima Shimoda (343 days)
- Shortest reign: Ayako Hamada and Michiko Ohmukai (<1 day)
- Oldest champion: Lioness Asuka (38 years, 358 days)
- Youngest champion: Ayako Hamada (18 years, 136 days)
- Heaviest champion: Aja Kong (103 kg (227 lb))
- Lightest champion: Mika Akino/Akino (57 kg (126 lb))

The Twin Star of Arsion Championship (Japanese: ツイン・スター・オブ・アルシオン王座, Hepburn: Tsuin Sutā Obu Arushion Ōza) was a professional wrestling tag team championship owned by the Hyper Visual Fighting Arsion promotion. Like most professional wrestling championships, the title was won as a result of a scripted match. The championship was introduced on December 7, 1998, when Hiromi Yagi and Rie Tamada defeated Ayako Hamada and Tiger Dream in the finals of a tournament to become the inaugural champions. During the next four and a half years, there were thirteen reigns shared among thirteen different wrestlers and eleven teams. The title was retired when Arsion went out of business on June 22, 2003, making Rie Tamada and Takako Inoue the final champions in the title's history.

== History ==
On December 7, 1998, Hiromi Yagi and Rie Tamada became the first champions in the title's history by defeating Ayako Hamada and Tiger Dream in the finals of a seven-team round-robin tournament. On October 21, 2001, right after Hamada and Michiko Omukai won the title by defeating the previous champions Lioness Asuka and Mariko Yoshida, it was vacated due to Hamada, who was the Queen of Arsion Champion at the time, wanted to concentrate on defending the Queen of Arison Championship.

On December 8, Gami and Rie Tamada won the vacant championship by defeating Ai Fujita and Michiko Omukai in the finals of an eight-team round-robin tournament.. On July 21, 2002, right before the previous champions Gami and Lioness Asuka's title defense, it was vacated. They won the title for the second time by defeating Ai Fujita and Michiko Omukai, and Bionic J and Melissa in a three-way tag team match. The championship was deactivated on June 22, 2003 as Arison's closing, with Rie Tamada and Takako Inoue being the last champions.

== Reigns ==
Over the championship's four-year history, there have been 13 reigns between 11 teams composed of 13 individual champions and two vacancies. Hiromi Yagi and Rie Tamada were the inaugural champions. As a team, Gami and Lioness Asuka, and Gami and Rie Tamada holds the record for most reigns at two, while individually, Gami and Rie Tamada has the most reigns at four. Las Cachorras Orientales (Etsuko Mita and Mima Shimoda)'s reign is the longest at 343 days, while Hamada and Michiko Omukai's reign is the shortest, which lasted less than a day. Lioness Asuka is the oldest champion at 38 years old, while Hamada is the youngest at 18 years old. On June 22, 2003 the title was deactivated.

Key
No.	Overall reign number
Reign	Reign number for the specific champion
Days	Number of days held
Defenses	Number of successful defenses

No.	Champion	Championship change			Reign statistics			Notes	Ref.
No.	Champion	Date	Event	Location	Reign	Days	Defenses	Notes	Ref.
1	Hiromi Yagi and Rie Tamada	December 7, 1998	Twinstar of Arison - Day 17	Tokyo, Japan	1	205	4	Defeated Ayako Hamada and Tiger Dream in the finals of a seven-team round-robin tournament to become the inaugural champions.	
2	Cazai; Ayako Hamada and Mika Akino/Akino	June 30, 1999	Live event	Tokyo, Japan	1	233	4	Mika Akino changed her ring name to Akino on July 25, 1999.	
3	Aja Kong and Mariko Yoshida	February 18, 2000	Live event	Tokyo, Japan	1	49	1		
4	Michiko Omukai and Mima Shimoda	April 7, 2000	Millennium Premium	Kawasaki, Kanagawa, Japan	1	135	2		
5	Gami and Rie Tamada (2)	August 20, 2000	Live event	Osaka, Japan	1	105	5		
6	Las Cachorras Orientales (Etsuko Mita and Mima Shimoda (2))	December 3, 2000	Live event	Tokyo, Japan	1	238	5		
7	Lioness Asuka and Mariko Yoshida (2)	July 29, 2001	Carnival the Queens	Tokyo, Japan	1	84	1		
8	Ayako Hamada (2) and Michiko Omukai (2)	October 21, 2001	Stargold - Day 5	Tokyo, Japan	1	<1	0		
—	Vacated	October 21, 2001	Stargold - Day 5	Tokyo, Japan	—	—	—	Ayako Hamada and Michiko Omukai vacated the title immediately after winning it due to Hamada wanting to concentrate on defending the Queen of Arsion Championship.	
9	Gami and Rie Tamada (3)	December 8, 2001	N/A	Tokyo, Japan	2	71	1	Defeated Ai Fujita and Michiko Omukai in the finals of an eight-team round-robin tournament to win the vacant championship.	
10	Ai Fujita and Michiko Omukai (3)	February 17, 2002	Arison 4th Anniversary	Tokyo, Japan	1	105	2		
11	Gami (3) and Lioness Asuka (2)	June 2, 2002	Starlight - Day 14 (Evening Show)	Sapporo, Hokkaido, Japan	1	49	0		
—	Vacated	July 21, 2002	—	Tokyo, Japan	—	—	—	Gami and Lioness Asuka championship the title right before a scheduled title match.	
12	Gami (4) and Lioness Asuka (3)	July 21, 2002	N/A	Tokyo, Japan	2	149	2	Defeated Ai Fujita and Michiko Omukai, and Bionic J and Melissa in a three-way match to win the vacant championship.	
13	Rie Tamada (4) and Takako Inoue	December 17, 2002	Carnival Arison	Tokyo, Japan	1	187	1		
—	Deactivated	June 22, 2003	—	—	—	—	—	The championship was retired, when Arsion goes out of business.	

== Combined reigns ==
<1	Indicates that the reign lasted less than one day

=== By team ===
Rank	Team	No. of reigns	Combined defenses	Combined days
1	Las Cachorras Orientales (Etsuko Mita and Mima Shimoda)	1	5	343
2	Cazai; Ayako Hamada and Mika Akino/Akino	1	4	233
3	Hiromi Yagi and Rie Tamada	1	3	205
4	Gami and Lioness Asuka	2	2	198
5	Rie Tamada and Takako Inoue	1	1	187
6	Gami and Rie Tamada	2	3	175
7	Michiko Omukai and Mima Shimoda	1	2	134
8	Ai Fujita and Michiko Omukai	1	2	105
9	Lioness Asuka and Mariko Yoshida	1	1	84
10	Aja Kong and Mariko Yoshida	1	1	50
11	Ayako Hamada and Michiko Omukai	1	0	<1

=== By wrestler ===
Rank	Wrestler	No. of reigns	Combined defenses	Combined days
1	Rie Tamada	4	7	567
2	Mima Shimoda	2	7	477
3	Gami	4	5	373
5	Etsuko Mita	1	5	343
5	Lioness Asuka	3	3	282
6	Michiko Omukai	3	4	239
7	Ayako Hamada	2	4	233
7	Mika Akino/Akino	1	4	233
9	Hiromi Yagi	1	3	205
10	Takako Inoue	1	1	187
11	Mariko Yoshida	2	2	134
12	Ai Fujita	1	2	105
13	Aja Kong	1	1	50

== See also ==
- AAAW Tag Team Championship
- JWP Tag Team Championship
- WWWA World Tag Team Championship
