= Arsion =

Japanese women's professional wrestling promotion

- Founded: 1997
- Defunct: 2003
- Style: Joshi Puroresu
- Headquarters: Japan
- Founder: Aja Kong
- Split from: All Japan Women's Pro-Wrestling
- Successor: AtoZ

Arsion (full official name Hyper Visual Fighting Arsion; frequently styled as ARSION) was a joshi puroresu (women's professional wrestling) promotion established in Japan in 1997 by Aja Kong. The first event took place on February 18, 1998 and was called "Virgin".

== History ==
In its initial conception, the major key figures in the company were founder Aja Kong, president, ex-AJW businessman Hiroshi "Rossy" Ogawa, manager Sakie Hasegawa and trainer Mariko Yoshida. Arsion's first event, entitled Virgin, took place in front of a sell-out crowd in Tokyo on February 18, 1998.

Arsion's wrestlers were trained at the promotion's dojo daily and attended Pancrase and Battlarts dojo events weekly, learning the styles of professional wrestling, lucha libre and shoot wrestling. The following year, in an attempt to boost audience numbers, Arsion put wrestlers Ai Fujita, AKINO, Ayako Hamada and Candy Okutsu together to form a pop group called Cazai. The act was an attempt to recreate the success of previous teams such as the Beauty Pair and Crush Gals, but in the end failed, leading to Arsion splitting the members up. Arsion then made another attempt to atttract audience by pushing former Cazai member Hamada to the top of the promotion with her defeating Aja Kong for the Queen of Arsion Championship in late 2000.

In 2001, Aja Kong left Arsion following a disagreement with management over the promotion's direction and subsequently sued president Ogawa for falsely advertising her for upcoming events. Kong's departure was followed by Ogawa signing Lioness Asuka as the promotion's new booker. Asuka proceeded to push herself, Etsuko Mita, Mima Shimoda and Gami into major storylines. In 2002, Ayako Hamada quit Arsion over internal politics within the promotion, feeling that she had been blamed for Arsion's recent problems and pushed down the card since Asuka took over the booking. Hamada joined Aja Kong at the Gaea Japan promotion. Arsion finally folded during the summer of 2003, after which Yumiko Hotta took over the promotion and renamed it AtoZ.

== Championships ==
Championship:	Final champion(s):	Date won:
Queen of Arsion Championship	Mariko Yoshida	August 24, 2003
Sky High of Arsion Championship	Mika Akino	February 17, 2003
Twin Star of Arsion Championship	Rie Tamada and Takako Inoue	December 17, 2002

== Tournaments ==
Tournament:	Final champion(s):	Date won:
ARS	Lioness Asuka	April 29, 2002
Sky High Tournament	Fabi Apache	October 27, 2001
Twin Stars of Arsion League	Gami and Rie Tamada	December 8, 2001
ZION Tournament	Mariko Yoshida	October 7, 2002

== Alumni ==
Since ARSION used numbers for their wrestlers, the list will be ordered numerically, with how long was their tenure in ARSION

1: Aja Kong (Nov 14th, 1997 – Feb 12th, 2001)

2: Mariko Yoshida (Nov 19th, 1997 – Jun 22nd, 2003), would a regular feature in AtoZ till December 2003

3: GAMI (Dec 2nd, 1997 – Jun 22nd, 2003), would be a regular feature in AtoZ till October 2004

4: Rie Tamada (Nov 19th, 1997 – Jun 22nd, 2003), would be a regular feature in AtoZ till her retirement in August 2004

5: Michiko Omukai (Dec 2nd, 1997 – Feb 11th, 2003), would briefly return to AtoZ in 2004

6: Yumi Fukawa (Nov 19th, 1997 – Mar 20th, 2001)

7: Candy Okutsu (Dec 18th, 1997 – Jan 5th, 2001)

8: Reggie Bennett (Dec 18th, 1997 – Apr 3rd, 1999)

9: Jessie Bennett (Dec 18th, 1997 – May 3rd, 2003)

10: Mary Apache (Mar 29th, 1998 – Jul 21st, 2002)

11: Faby Apache (Mar 29th, 1998 – Jun 28th, 2002), currently working in WWE-affiliated AAA

12: Lady Metal (Apr 17th, 1998 – Dec 16th, 1998)

13: AKINO (Jul 21st, 1998 – Jun 22nd, 2003), would be a regular feature in AtoZ until November 2003

14: Ayako Hamada (Dec 18th, 1997 – Jan 13rd, 2002)

15: Tiger Dream (Candy Okutsu)

16: Hiromi Yagi (JWP, Aug 31st, 1998 – Feb 11th, 2003)

17: Esther Moreno (Oct 7th, 1998 – Dec 18th, 1998)

18: Emiko Kado (Feb 6th, 1999 – Mar 31st, 1999)

19: La Galactica 2000 (Feb 14th, 1999 – Aug 8th, 1999)

20: Hikari Fukuoka (Mar 16th, 1999)

21: Ai Fujita (Apr 14th, 1999 – Jun 22nd, 2003), would be a regular feature in AtoZ until her retirement in April 2004

22: Chaparita ASARI (NEO Ladies) (Jul 25th, 1999 – Apr 29th, 2003)

23: LINDA STAR (Jul 25th, 1999 – Feb 25th, 2002)

24: Princesa Sugehit (Jul 25th, 1999 – Oct 19th, 1999)

25: Mima Shimoda (Jul 25th, 1999 – Jun 22nd, 2003), would be a regular feature in AtoZ until September 2005

26: Etsuko Mita (Jul 25th, 1999 – Apr 7th, 2002)

27: Masked Angel Rosetta (Hiromi Yagi)

28: Reina Takase (Feb 12th, 2000 – Jun 22nd, 2003), would be a regular feature in AtoZ until January 2005

29: Bionic J (Jessie Bennett)

30: Gran Hamada (Apr 7th, 2000 – Dec 23rd, 2001)

31: Gran Apache (Apr 7th, 2000 – Nov 25th, 2001)

32: Xochitl Hamada (Apr 20th, 2000 – Dec 24th, 2000)

33: Minoru Tanaka (Mar 12th, 2000 – Jun 7th, 2000)

34: Takeshi Ono (Mar 12th, 2000 – May 25th, 2000)

35: Yuki Ishikawa (Mar 12th, 2000 – Jun 7th, 2000)

36: Sumie Sakai (Jan 26th, 2003 – May 25th, 2003)

37: Red Lynx (Candy Okutsu)

38: Ricky Marvin (2000)

39: PIKO (Aug 12th, 2000 – May 24th, 2003)

40: Azumi Hyuga (JWP) (Nov 19th, 2000 – May 24th, 2003)

41, 63: Mister Cacao (Dec 3rd, 2000 – Feb 12th, 2001, Jul 14th, 2001 – Feb 17th, 2002)

42: Yuu Yamagata (Dec 3rd, 2000 – Apr 14th, 2002)

43: Ryo Miyuki (Jan 5th, 2001 – Feb 12th, 2001), would briefly return to AtoZ as Ai Fujita's manager in 2004

44: PIKA (Linda Star)

45: Lady Apache (Mar 15th, 2001 – Jan 17th, 2002)

46: Chikako Shiratori (Apr 21st, 2001 – May 6th, 2001)

47: POKO (Jun 3rd, 2001 – Sep 14th, 2001)

48: Emi Sakura (Jun 3rd, 2001 – Aug 12th, 2001)

49: Tiger Mask (Jun 24th, 2001)

50: The Great Sasuke (Jun 24th, 2001)

51: Misae Genki (Jun 24th, 2001)

52: Yuka Shiina (Aug 3rd, 2001)

53: Kaori Nakayama (Aug 5th, 2001 – Aug 12th, 2001)

54: Tsubasa Kuragaki (Aug 12th, 2001 – May 11th, 2002)

55: noki-A (Mika Akino)

56: baby-M (Sept 11th, 2001 – Jun 22nd, 2003)

57: Alda Moreno (POKO)

58, 76: Kaori Yoneyama (Nov 3rd, 2001 – Jun 23rd, 2002/Nov 17th, 2002 – May 24th, 2003)

59: Baby A (baby-M)

60: Debbie Malenko (Nov 25th, 2001)

61: Men's noki-A (Nov 25th, 2001 – Dec 9th, 2001)

62, 73: La Ampola (Jan 6th, 2002 – Jun 3rd, 2002)

65: Ran Yu-yu (Apr 7th, 2002)

66: Chitose Yamamoto (May 11th, 2002)

67: MARU (May 11th, 2002 – October 22nd, 2002)

68: Saki Maemura (May 11th, 2002 – Nov 2nd, 2002)

69: Hiroyoshi Kotsubo (May 11th, 2002)

70: Kayo Noumi (May 11th, 2002 – Apr 27th, 2003)

71: Mako Ogawa (May 11th, 2002 – Sept 4th, 2002)

72: Don Fujii (2002)/Mari Kuwata (May 11th, 2002)

74: Taylor Matheny (Jun 23rd, 2002 – Sep 23rd, 2002)

75: Cheerleader Melissa (Jun 23rd, 2002 – Sep 23rd, 2002)

77: Momoe Nakanishi (Mar 12th, 2002 – Dec 17th, 2002), would be a regular feature in AtoZ from September 2003 till January 2005

78: Emi Tomimatsu (Jul 9th, 2002 – Oct 9th, 2002)

79: Emi Tojo (Jul 21st, 2002 – Oct 7th, 2002)

80: Command Bolshoi (PIKO)

94: Atsuko Emoto (Jan 26th, 2003 – Jun 22nd, 2003), would be a regular feature in AtoZ until January 2005

95: Yukari Kitao (Apr 26th, 2003 – Jun 22nd, 2003), would be a regular feature in AtoZ until her retirement in June 2004

96: Mickey/Yuka (Jun 8th, 2003 – Jun 22nd, 2003)

99: Sakie Hasegawa (Nov 14th, 1997 – c. 1999)

100: Lioness Asuka (Jul 3rd, 2001 – May 16th, 2003)

110: Pentagón (Jun 24th, 2001 – Jul 15th, 2001)

111: Nanae Takahashi (May 11th, 2002 – Nov 10th, 2002)

118: Tomoko Watanabe (May 11th, 2002)

119: Gedo (Jun 24th, 2001)

200: Mikiko Futagami (GAMI)

240: Mika Nishio (Mar 12th, 2002 – Jun 22nd, 2003), would be a regular feature in AtoZ until November 2005

241: Miyuki Fujii (Mar 12th, 2002 – Dec 17th, 2002)

296: Kamikaze (2002)

644: Yumiko Hotta (May 11th, 2002 – Jun 22nd, 2003), would purchase ARSION and rebrand it as AtoZ until its dissolvement in August 2006

777: Manami Toyota (Nov 25th, 2001)

935: Kumiko Maegawa (2003)

1000: Rossy Ogawa (Nov 14th, 1997 – Jun 22nd, 2003)

1107: Takako Inoue (Jul 10th, 2002 – May 16th, 2003)

1910: Ikuto Hidaka (Men's noki-A)

2500: Tiger Honey (Azumi Hyuga)

A09: Alexander Otsuka (Mar 12th, 2000 – Jun 7th, 2000)

GO: Magnum Tokyo (Dec 11th, 1999)

== See also ==
- Puroresu
