= Michiko Omukai =

Japanese wrestler

Michiko Omukai 大向美智子
Personal information
- Born: May 30, 1975 (age 51) Kuji, Iwate Prefecture, Japan
- Family: Shinno (daughter)

Professional wrestling career
- Ring name: Michiko Omukai
- Billed height: 5 ft 7 in (170 cm)
- Billed weight: 143 lb (65 kg)
- Trained by: All Japan Women's Pro-Wrestling Dojo
- Debut: January 11, 1992
- Retired: December 9, 2007

Michiko Omukai (ja: 大向美智子, born May 30, 1975) is a Japanese former professional wrestler. She wrestled for All Japan Women's Pro-Wrestling, Ladies Legend Pro-Wrestling and Arsion.

== Professional wrestling career ==
=== All Japan Women's and Ladies Legend Pro Wrestling ===
Omukai passed the 1991 All Japan Women's Pro-Wrestling audition alongside Rie Tamada, Kumiko Maekawa and Chikako Shiratori. She attempted to debut that year, but due to injuries, she had to wait until January 11, 1992. She debuted against Shiho Nakamigawa, but was injured while practicing her match. She re-debuted with LLPW in 1993.

On September 27, 1994, she teamed up with Carol Midori to capture the AJW Tag Team Championship from fellow LLPW members, Yasha Kurenai and Miki Handa. The team held onto the titles until March 17, 1995, when they were defeated by Rie Tamada and Mariko Yoshida.

On April 15, 1997, she took on FMW wrestler Megumi Kudo in a losing effort.

=== Arsion ===
Due to a lack of progress in LLPW, Omukai joined Arsion in 1998. She appeared on their first show on February 18, 1998, taking on Aja Kong in a spirited contest, which some considered her best performance to date. In May 1998, she competed in the ARS '98 single elimination tournament, but was defeated by fellow AJW classmate, Rie Tamada in the first round.

In August 1998, she competed in the Arsion ZION '98 tournament. She defeated Yumi Fukawa before losing to Mariko Yoshida in the 2nd round. On December 18, 1998, she teamed up with Yumi Fukawa in a losing effort against Rie Tamada and Hiromi Yagi at Carnival Arsion '98.

1999 would prove to be Omukai's breakout year as she was awarded the 1999 Arsion MVP. On May 4, 1999, Omukai competed in the ARS '99 tournament. She won the tournament defeating Mikiko Futagami, Candy Okutsu and Hiromi Yagi in the finals. In August, she competed in the ZION '99 tournament. She defeated rival Rie Tamada, Mikiko Futagami and AJW wrestler, Mima Shimoda to win the tournament. Omukai then teamed with Yumi Fukawa to compete in the 1999 Twin Star of Arsion Tag Team League. The team made it to the finals where they were defeated by Las Cachorras Orientales (Etsuko Mita and Mima Shimoda) in the finals. The teams would meet again on January 30, 2000, and February 18, 2000, with the first match going to a draw and the second match ending with win for Mita and Shimoda. Omukai would end up joining together which Las Cachorras Orientales in 2000.

On April 7, 2000, Omukai teamed up with Shimoda to capture the Twin Star of Arsion tag team titles by defeating Aja Kong and Mariko Yoshida. At ARS 2000, on May 7, 2000, Omukai defeated Etsuko Mita and Yumi Fukawa before losing in the finals to Aja Kong. In September 2000, Omukai then competed in the ZION 2000 tournament, losing to rival Rie Tamada in the first round. On October 29, 2000, Omukai teamed with Shimoda to make it to the finals of the 2000 Twin Stars of Arsion Tag League.

On April 30, 2001, Omukai competed in the ARS 2001 tournament defeating GAMI (former Mikiko Futagami) in the finals. On July 3, 2001, at STARLIGHT '01, Omukai challenged for the Queen of Arsion Championship, but was defeated by Ayako Hamada. On September 22, 2001, Omukai competed in the ZION 2001 tournament, but was defeated by Mima Shimoda in the first round. She competed in the November Twinstar of Arsion 2001 league with partner Ai Fujita. The team became known as "Cyber Junk". The team was defeated in the finals by GAMi and Rie Tamada. At Carnival Arsion 2001 on November 25, 2011, she competed against classmate, Sakie Hasegawa.

On January 13, 2002, she competed in her 10th Anniversary match against Lioness Asuka, which ended in a draw. On February 17, 2002, her Cyber Junk team with Ai Fujita captured the Twin Star of Arsion Championship. At Arsion STARWARS 2002 on May 11, 2002, Omukai defeated Lioness Asuka for the Queen of Arsion Championship, making her a double champion as she also held the Twin Star of Arsion titles. On June 7, 2002, Omukai competed in a rare women's ten person tag match in New Japan Pro-Wrestling. In October, Omukai competed in the ZION 2002 tournament, making it to the semi-finals. Omukai defended her Queen of Arsion title successfully twice in 2002 against noki-A and Mariko Yoshida.

=== M's style and final years ===
In February 2003, Omukai left Arsion. In April 2004, Along with Mariko Yoshida, Akino and Momoe Nakanishi, they formed the M's Style unit. The "M" in M-Style referred to all four of them having the initial of "M" in their names. The group eventually held their own events. On August 22, 2004, Omukai teamed with classmate Rie Tamada and Kumiko Maekawa against Mariko Yoshida, GAMI and AKINO in Tamada's retirement match.

On June 28, 2005, she competed in a MMA match for Smackgirl and was victorious.

Omukai retired on December 9, 2007, at "Michiko Omukai Farewell Performance Final Egoist". She competed in a 10-person tag match with AKINO, Ayumi Kurihara, Bullfight Sora, Tojuki Leon and defeated Ai Fujita, Aja Kong, GAMI, Ayako Hamada and Mariko Yoshida. She returned from retirement on July 23, 2017, for World Wonder Ring Stardom, teaming with Konami and Yoko Bito to defeat Oedo Tai. She has since sporadically wrestled, wrestling one match for Niigata Pro Wrestling in 2019, and GLEAT in 2021.

== Personal life ==
Omukai is married with two children. Omukai's daughter debuted as a professional wrestler on May 24, 2025, wrestling for Marigold under the name Shinno. Omukai is related to Japanese diver, Misaki Omukai and Japanese enka singer, Misaki Kanazawa.

== Championships and accomplishments ==
- All Japan Women's Pro-Wrestling
  - AJW Tag Team Championship (with Carol Midori)
- Arsion
  - Twin Star of Arsion Championship (with Ai Fujita)
  - Queen of Arsion Championship
  - ARS '99 Tournament Champion
  - Twin Star of Arsion 1999 League Champion (with Yumi Fukawa)
  - ARS 2001 Tournament Champion

== Mixed martial arts record ==
Professional record breakdown
1 match	1 win	0 losses
By knockout	1	0
By submission	0	0
By decision	0	0
By disqualification	0	0
Unknown	0	0
Draws	0	
No contests	0	

Res.	Record	Opponent	Method	Event	Date	Round	Time	Location	Notes
Win	1–0	Hee Jin Lee	TKO (punches)	Smackgirl - Road to Dynamic!!	June 28, 2005	1	4:28	Tokyo, Japan	
