= Omukai =

Omukai (written: 大向) is a Japanese surname. Notable people with the surname include

- Ikki Omukai (大向一輝, born 1977), Japanese scholar
- Michiko Omukai (大向美智子, born 1975), Japanese professional wrestler
- Misaki Omukai (大向美咲, born 1990), Japanese diver
