= Cong =

Cong may refer to:

- Cong (vessel), a form of jade artifact from ancient China
- Cong (surname), (叢/丛) a Chinese surname
- Cong, County Mayo, Ireland, a village
- Cong Weixi (1933–2019), Chinese author influential in the post-Mao literary scene
- Phunoi people, called Cống in Vietnam, an indigenous people
- A slang name for the Vietcong, in the Vietnam War
- Colorado National Guard

== See also ==
- Kong (disambiguation)
