= Lioness Asuka =

Japanese professional wrestler

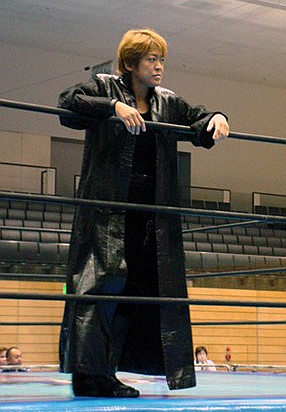
- Lioness Asuka in 2006

Personal information
- Born: Tomoko Kitamura; July 28, 1963 (age 63) Tokyo, Japan

Professional wrestling career
- Ring name(s): Lioness Asuka; Tomoko Kitamura; Zone
- Trained by: All Japan Women's Pro-Wrestling
- Debut: May 10, 1980
- Retired: April 3, 2005

Tomoko Kitamura (北村 智子, Kitamura Tomoko; born July 28, 1963) is a Japanese retired professional wrestler better known by her ring name Lioness Asuka (ライオネス 飛鳥, Raionesu Asuka). She was one half of the Crush Gals professional wrestling tag team, along with Chigusa Nagayo, who are known for their mainstream popularity in the 1980s, and for being one of the most successful women's tag teams of all time.

== Professional wrestling career ==
=== All Japan Women's Pro Wrestling (1980-1989) ===
==== Early career (1980-1983) ====
Asuka joined All Japan Women's Pro-Wrestling (AJW) in 1980 and made her professional debut on May 10 of that year. She was an immediate success, winning her first title, the AJW Junior Championship, the following year, and the AJW Championship in 1982.

==== Crush Gals (1983–1986) ====
On January 4, 1983, Asuka was matched against her future partner and the other half of the future Crush Gals tag team, Chigusa Nagayo. They had a standout performance and got a good response, which led to them becoming partners. The Crush Gals name was created from a combination of a nickname of Akira Maeda and a Japanese magazine called Gals. The Crush Gals then wrestled to another 60 minute draw against Jaguar Yokota and Devil Masami in June to a crowd of 5,000 fans. The Crush Gals released their first music single on August 21, called Bible of Fire, eventually selling over 100,000 copies. On August 25, the Crush Gals defeated their rivals, the Dynamite Girls, to capture the WWWA World Tag Team Championship.

In 1985, the Crush Gals began a rivalry with Dump Matsumoto's heel stable, the Atrocious Alliance. On February 25, Matsumoto and Crane Yu defeated the Crush Gals for the WWWA World Tag Team Championship.

==== Post-Crush Gals (1986-1989) ====
In the late 1980s, Crush Gals broke up, after which Asuka began a lengthy feud with Chigusa Nagayo. On February 26, Asuka and Nagayo clashed in a #1 Contender's Match for the WWWA World Single Championship. The match went to a 30-minute draw. Asuka won the WWWA World Single Championship on August 25, 1988, by defeating Nagayo, but immediately vacated it due to Nagayo's arm injury. Asuka and Nagayo's feud culminated in another match for the WWWA World Single Championship in 1989, which Asuka won. Asuka retired later that year.

=== Freelance (1994-2005) ===
Asuka came out of retirement on November 20, 1994, and formed the Rideen Array, a faction consisting of fellow freelance wrestlers Jaguar Yokota and Bison Kimura. She subsequently wrestled for many of the new women's promotions that arose at that time, such as Jd' and Arsion. She made one appearance for the WWF at the 1995 Survivor Series, teaming with Bertha Faye, Aja Kong, and Tomoko Watanabe. They defeated the team of Alundra Blayze, Kyoko Inoue, Sakie Hasegawa and Chaparita Asari.

=== GAEA Japan (1998-2005) ===
In 1998, she made a significant move when she joined GAEA Japan, the promotion run by her former partner, Nagayo. Asuka began her GAEA career as a top heel, feuding with Nagayo, and, in one storyline, winning control of the organization from her and eventually creating the Super Star Unit (SSU), a faction composed of veteran stars such as Akira Hokuto, Aja Kong, and Las Cachorras Orientales, among others. However, near the end of 1999, Nagayo and Asuka united against a common rival, the Mayumi Ozaki-led faction Team Nostradamus, and, the next spring, reformed Crush Gals. The storyline was huge news in Japan, and GAEA's show of May 14, 2000, featuring the debut of the reunited team, now called CRUSH 2000, was the biggest in the promotion's history.

Due to a neck injury, Asuka announced her retirement on November 3, 2004. Her retirement was made official on April 3, 2005, where she and Chigusa Nagayo teamed up for the last time to defeat Chikayo Nagashima and Sugar Sato at GAEA's tenth anniversary show.

== Championships and accomplishments ==
- All Japan Women's Pro-Wrestling

- AJW Championship (2 times)
- AJW Junior Championship (1 time)
- Unified Global Championship (1 time)
- WWWA World Single Championship (2 times)
- WWWA World Tag Team Championship (4 times) – with Chigusa Nagayo
- Japan Grand Prix (1985)
- Tag League the Best (1987) – with Chigusa Nagayo
- 1980 Rookie of the Year Decision Tournament
- AJW Hall of Fame (Class of 1998)

- Arsion

- Queen of Arsion Championship (1 time)
- Twin Star of Arsion Championship (3 times) – with Mariko Yoshida (1) and Gami (2)

- GAEA Japan

- AAAW Tag Team Championship (1 time) – with Chigusa Nagayo

- JDStar

- TWF World Women's Championship (4 times)

- Ladies Legend Pro-Wrestling

- LLPW Six Woman Tag Team Championship (2 times) – with Eagle Sawai and Shark Tsuchiya (2)

- NEO Japan Ladies Pro-Wrestling

- NWA Women's Pacific/NEO Single Championship (1 time)

- Tokyo Sports

- Joshi Puroresu Grand Prize (1997)

- Wrestling Observer Newsletter awards

- Wrestling Observer Newsletter Hall of Fame (Class of 1999)

Professional record breakdown
5 matches	3 wins	1 loss
By knockout	0	0
By submission	3	1
By decision	0	0
Draws	1	

Tomoko Kitamura mixed martial arts record
Res.	Record	Opponent	Method	Event	Date	Round	Time	Location	Notes
Win	3–1–0	Irma Verhoeff	Submission (Rear-Naked Choke)	LLPW: Ultimate L-1 1998	10 October 1998	1	9:26	Tokyo, Japan	
Win	2–1–0	Won Kyo Cho	Submission	Japan Regional	8 December 1997	1	15:31	Japan	
Win	1–1–0	Margot Neyhoft	Submission	Japan Regional	12 August 1996	2	4:14	Japan	
Loss	0–1–0	Yumiko Hotta	Submission (Armbar)	Japan Regional	13 August 1996	1	3:11	Japan	
