= Kong (ride) =

Amusement ride

KONG
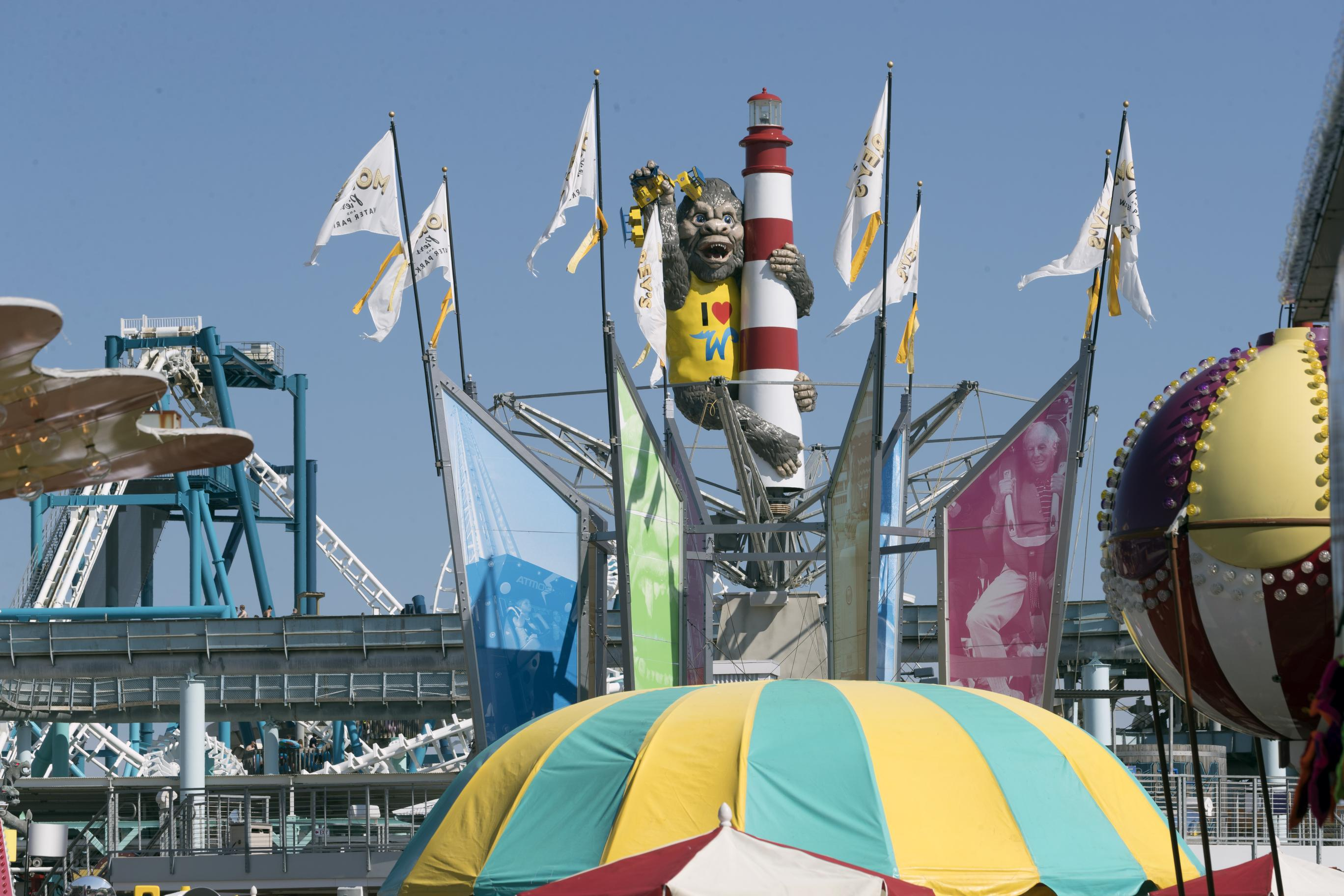

Morey's Piers
- Area: Surfside Pier
- Status: Operating
- Cost: $1.3 million
- Opening date: 1971 (original), 2015 (rebuilt)
- Closing date: 1980 (original)

Ride statistics
- Attraction type: Flying Scooters (rebuilt)
- Height: 60 ft (18 m)
- Speed: 27 mph (43 km/h)
- Duration: 2 minutes
- Height restriction: 44 in (112 cm)

Kong is a ride on the Surfside Pier at Morey's Piers seaside park. Each rider has a plane to fly around in and has steering controls. It is a typical Flying Scooters ride, manufactured by Larson International.

== History ==
The original KONG ride opened in 1971 and was one of the original rides on the North Wildwood pier. The planes on the ride were removed in 1975. The giant ape that resembles King Kong fell apart when they tried to move it to New York for refurbishment in 1980. Three decades later, 6,200 people took a survey and voted to bring back Kong in order to revitalize Wildwood's famous boardwalk. They got their wish and the new Kong ride opened in 2015. Underneath the current Kong ride is a store that has Wildwood and Kong merchandise.

== Theme ==
The theme of the ride is set to the classic 1933 movie King Kong, where the airplanes fly around the buildings trying to take down the reckless ape.
