= DK (automobile) =

Overview
- Manufacturer: S. A. Mathiesen
- Production: 1950
- Assembly: Denmark

Body and chassis
- Class: Prototype
- Body style: Chassisless

Powertrain
- Engine: Heinkel
- Transmission: ZF Friedrichshafen

Chronology
- Successor: DKR

The DK was a Danish automobile built as a prototype by S. A. Mathiesen in 1950. It was supposed to combine American comfort with European dimensions and economy. It featured a chassisless aluminum body, a Heinkel engine and a ZF Friedrichshafen gearbox. It remained a prototype, but in 1953 a new, modified version was introduced as the DKR. A few dozen were built, until 1954.
