= Queen of Arsion Championship =

Professional wrestling women's championship

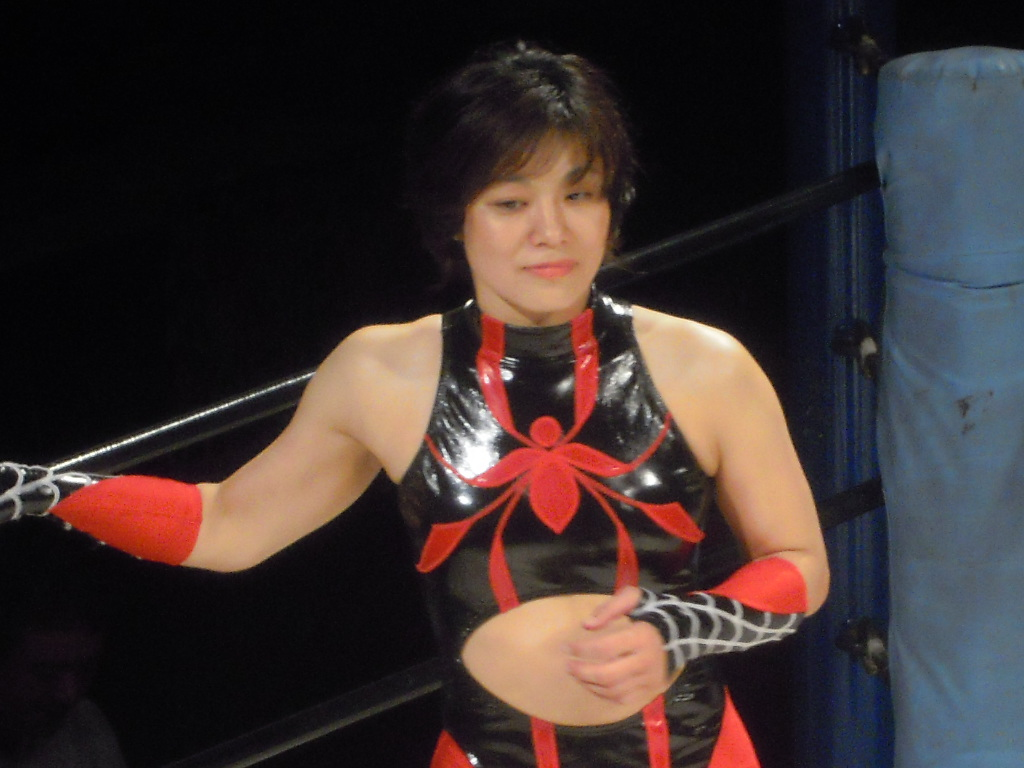
- Mariko Yoshida, who held the Queen of Arsion Championship three times

Details
- Promotion: Hyper Visual Fighting Arsion
- Date established: December 18, 1998
- Date retired: August 24, 2003
Statistics
- First champion: Mariko Yoshida
- Final champion: Mariko Yoshida
- Most reigns: Mariko Yoshida (3 reigns)
- Longest reign: Aja Kong (485 days)
- Shortest reign: Mariko Yoshida (3rd reign, <1 day)
- Oldest champion: Lioness Asuka (38 years, 120 days)
- Youngest champion: Ayako Hamada (19 years, 293 days)
- Heaviest champion: Aja Kong (103 kg (227 lb))
- Lightest champion: Ayako Hamada (62 kg (137 lb))

The Queen of Arsion Championship (Japanese: クイーン・オブ・アルシオン王座, Hepburn: Kuīn Obu Arushion Ōza) was a women's professional wrestling championship in Japan owned by the Hyper Visual Fighting Arsion promotion. Like most professional wrestling championships, the title was won as a result of a scripted match. The championship, which was situated at the top of Arsion's championship hierarchy, was introduced on December 18, 1998, when Mariko Yoshida defeated Candy Okutsu to become the inaugural champion. The two contestants had earlier in the year won separate tournaments to qualify for the match. During the next four and a half years, there were eight reigns shared among six different wrestlers. The title was retired on August 24, 2003, two months after the folding of Arsion, when Yoshida defeated Mima Shimoda to become the final champion.

== History ==
On December 18, 1998, Mariko Yoshida became the first champion in the title history by defeating the winner of the Ars '98 tournament, Candy Okutsu. On February 11, 2003, the championship was vacated after the previous titleholder Michiko Omukai left the promotion. On April 29, Yoshida defeated Rie Tamada to win the vacant championship, marking it her second reign. On August 24, after Yoshida won the championship for the third time, she immediately vacated it, and the title became deactivated with the promotion's closing.

== Reigns ==
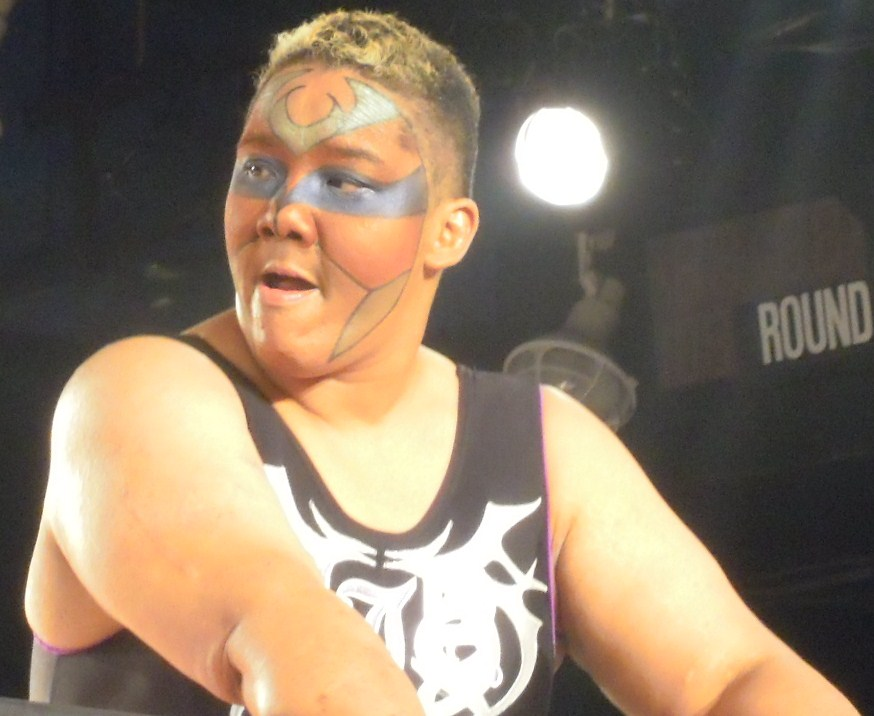
The longest reigning champion, Aja Kong

Over the championship's four-year history, there have been eight reigns between six champions and one vacancy. Mariko Yoshida was the inaugural and final champion, who also holds the record for most reigns at three. Aja Kong's reign is the longest at 485 days, while Yoshida's third reign and the last in the title history is the shortest, lasting less than a day. Lioness Asuka is the oldest champion at 38 years old, while Ayako Hamada is the youngest at 19 years old.

Key
No.	Overall reign number
Reign	Reign number for the specific champion
Days	Number of days held
Defenses	Number of successful defenses

No.	Champion	Championship change			Reign statistics			Notes	Ref.
No.	Champion	Date	Event	Location	Reign	Days	Defenses	Notes	Ref.
1	Mariko Yoshida	December 18, 1998	N/A	Yokohama, Kanagawa, Japan	1	231	4	Yoshida, winner of the Zion '98 tournament, defeated Candy Okutsu, winner of the Ars '98 tournament, in a decision match to become the inaugural champion.	
2	Aja Kong	August 6, 1999	Carnival The Queens	Tokyo, Japan	1	485	7		
3	Ayako Hamada	December 3, 2000	Live event	Tokyo, Japan	1	357	5		
4	Lioness Asuka	November 25, 2001	Carnival Arison	Urayasu, Chiba, Japan	1	167	5		
5	Michiko Omukai	May 11, 2002	Premium Starwars	Tokyo, Japan	1	276	2		
—	Vacated	February 11, 2003	—	—	—	—	—	The championship was vacated after Michiko Omukai left Hyper Visual Fighting Arsion.	
6	Mariko Yoshida	April 29, 2003	N/A	Tokyo, Japan	2	54	0	Yoshida defeated Rie Tamada for the vacant championship.	
7	Mima Shimoda	June 22, 2003	Starlet	Tokyo, Japan	1	63	0	This was the final Hyper Visual Fighting Arsion event.	
8	Mariko Yoshida	August 24, 2003	AtoZ Flag Raising Series ~ Attention Please - Day 7	Tokyo, Japan	3	<1	0	This was an eight-woman elimination tag team match, where Yoshida, Ai Fujita, Akino and Rie Tamada faced Mima Shimoda, Mirai, Sachie Abe and Yumiko Hotta.	
—	Deactivated	August 24, 2003	—	—	—	—	—	Mariko Yoshida retired the championship immediately after winning it.	

== Combined reigns ==
Rank	Wrestler	No. of reigns	Combined defenses	Combined days
1	Aja Kong	1	7	485
2	Ayako Hamada	1	5	357
3	Mariko Yoshida	3	4	285
4	Michiko Omukai	1	2	276
5	Lioness Asuka	1	5	167
6	Mima Shimoda	1	0	63

== See also ==
- AAAW Single Championship
- JWP Openweight Championship
- WWWA World Single Championship
