= Tiger Mask (professional wrestling) =

Japanese wrestling persona

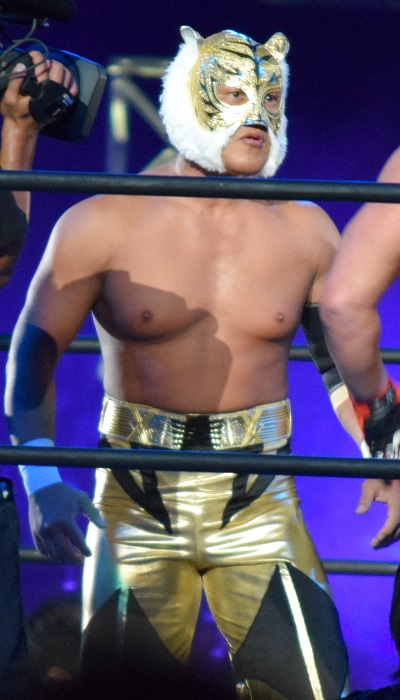
Tiger Mask IV

Tiger Mask (タイガーマスク, Taigāmasuku) is the persona of several Japanese professional wrestlers. The persona was inspired by the title character in Ikki Kajiwara's and Naoki Tsuji's 1968 manga series, Tiger Mask about a professional wrestler who was a feared heel in the United States, but became a face after returning to Japan when a young boy said that he wanted to be a villain like Tiger Mask when he grew up.

== History ==
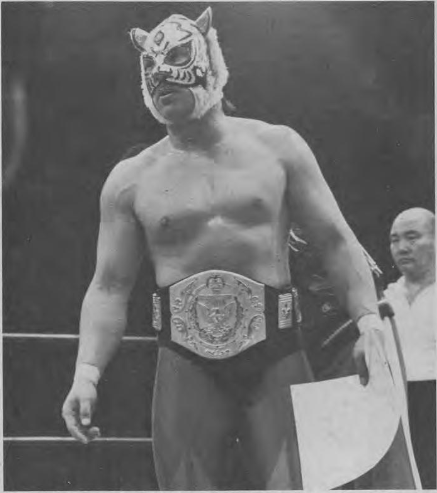
Satoru Sayama as the original Tiger Mask, 1982

In the early 1980s, the bookers in the New Japan Pro-Wrestling (NJPW) promotion licensed the character and created a real-life Tiger Mask, originally portrayed by Satoru Sayama, to help boost their junior heavyweight division. In the United States, Tiger Mask was the first wrestler to simultaneously hold the WWF Junior Heavyweight Championship and NWA World Junior Heavyweight Championship. Sayama played the role until 1983, when he left New Japan due to his hatred for the backstage politics of professional wrestling in general. As Tiger Mask, Sayama feuded with Kuniaki Kobayashi, Canada's Bret Hart, England's Chris Adams, Steve Wright and Dynamite Kid, Mexico's Fishman and the original Black Tiger.

In 1984, the rights to the Tiger Mask gimmick were bought by All Japan Pro Wrestling and given to Mitsuharu Misawa. Misawa also feuded with Dynamite Kid and Kuniaki Kobayashi, as well as Chavo Guerrero, Sr. and Atsushi Onita; he then moved up to the heavyweight division to feud, albeit unsuccessfully, with Jumbo Tsuruta and Genichiro Tenryu. In May 1990, Misawa gave up the mask in the middle of a match to wrestle as himself.

NJPW's Koji Kanemoto became the third Tiger Mask in March 1992 but was unsuccessful due to the dominance of Jyushin Thunder Liger. Kanemoto was never able to win a title as Tiger Mask and eventually lost the mask in a mask-vs-mask match against Liger in January 1994.

Since 1995, the name Tiger Mask has been held by Yoshihiro Yamazaki, who was trained directly (and is officially endorsed) by Sayama. Tiger Mask IV, originally based in Michinoku Pro Wrestling, joined NJPW in 2002.

On October 12, 1997, a tag team match was held at Ryōgoku Kokugikan during an event commemorating the 10th anniversary of the death of Ikki Kajiwara, titled "97 Martial Arts Festival Special", where Tiger Mask I and Tiger Mask IV faced Tiger Mask II and Tiger Mask III. Since Misawa was unable to participate due to his schedule, he was substituted by Yoshinobu Kanemaru who was referred to as "the second generation of the second generation".

A fifth-generation Tiger Mask, MMA fighter Ikuhisa Minowa, debuted on July 18, 2010, alongside the original Tiger Mask, Sayama, in a tag match for Maki Dojo.

On August 10, 2013, at a memorial event for mangaka Hisao Maki titled "Kick Guts 2013 Ikki Kajiwara Cup: Hisao Maki Memorial Event", a sixth-generation Tiger Mask appeared as a second for the team of the original Tiger Mask and Masashi Aoyagi. Sayama announced beforehand that "the sixth-generation Tiger Mask was a proven fighter," and although he did not participate in the match itself, he rescued Sayama and Aoyagi during a post-match brawl. The sixth-generation wore the same costume as in the 2013 film Tiger Mask directed by Ken Ochiai, featuring a design with added protective gear. This incarnation is believed to have been portrayed by former kickboxer Toshio Fujiwara, who also appeared at Chakuriki 15: The Return of the Fujiwara Festival, an event produced by the International Chakuriki Association on April 27, 2022, wearing the tiger mask.

In conjunction with the launch of the Tiger Mask W anime series, NJPW debuted Tiger Mask W on October 10, 2016, at King of Pro-Wrestling. This character was portrayed by Kota Ibushi and teamed with Tiger Mask IV in a match against Kazuchika Okada and Gedo.

On May 24, 2023, a press conference was held for the "7th Tiger Mask Project", where it was announced that kickboxer Takeru Segawa would take on the role of the seventh-generation Tiger Mask. However, Segawa's succession as the seventh-generation Tiger Mask would not signify a transition to professional wrestling, but rather the continuation of Sayama's social contribution activities.

Incarnations of Tiger Mask
Generation	Name (Note: Italics indicate the identity has not been officially confirmed.)
Tiger Mask I	Satoru Sayama
Tiger Mask II	Mitsuharu Misawa
Tiger Mask III	Koji Kanemoto
Tiger Mask IV	Yoshihiro Yamazaki
Tiger Mask V	Ikuhisa Minowa
Tiger Mask VI	Toshio Fujiwara
Tiger Mask W	Kota Ibushi
Tiger Mask VII	Takeru Segawa

== Related characters ==
The evil twin character Black Tiger (using a black costume with silver stripes) was created by New Japan in 1981 to oppose Sayama, and portrayed by Mark Rocco, though he did not exclusively feud with Tiger Mask. As Black Tiger, Rocco also feuded with The Cobra (George Takano), and the second incarnation Eddie Guerrero also feuded with Jushin Liger and Wild Pegasus. For many years, Black Tiger was only portrayed by foreign wrestlers, but the tradition was broken in 2009, when Tatsuhito Takaiwa was unmasked as Black Tiger. Tomohiro Ishii also had a short-lived run as the sixth incarnation in 2010.

When Tiger Mask IV was in Michinoku Pro Wrestling, he was briefly opposed by Masked Tiger, a doppelgänger character portrayed by Battlarts wrestler Takeshi Ono.

Último Dragón, as a temporary break between gigs in World Wrestling Entertainment (WWE), adopted the name and character The Tiger, modeled after the original, "The Tiger" Satoru Sayama, who was his childhood idol. Último also made a character called Tiger Dragon which saw his attire a blend of the Último Dragón and Tiger Mask garb. Sayama himself used the Super Tiger (in the original UWF) and uses the Tiger King and Original Tiger Mask characters in special appearances since 1996, as a means to differentiate himself as being the original.

Real Japan Pro Wrestling, a promotion founded by Sayama, has a wrestler named Super Tiger II, who has an opponent named Tiger Shark. Both of them are Sayama trainees.

Sayama also gave brief authorization for a female version of the character, called Tiger Dream, to be played by female wrestler Candy Okutsu in the mid-1990s. He and Tiger Mask IV also provided her with training. Another female gimmick, this one named Tiger Queen, debuted in Strong Style Pro-Wrestling in 2021, with wrestler Asuka under the mask.

Osaka Pro has a wrestler named Tigers Mask who wears a mask similar to Tiger Mask and is portrayed as a fan of the Hanshin Tigers baseball team. He had an opponent named Black Tigers, a character referencing Black Tiger and played by Jeremy Lopez, as well as Black Buffalo, representing the other Osaka baseball team, the Kintetsu Buffaloes.

Former Frontier Martial-Arts Wrestling superstar Ricky Fuji developed a Tiger Mask persona of his own called Calgary Tiger, influenced by the Canadian city, where he was trained, and debuted as a wrestler. He had debuted under the Tiger Mask persona in Stampede Wrestling, before changing his persona to Black Tomcat, while in the North Western Wrestling Federation in Canada.

American pro wrestler Treach Phillips Jr. wrestled as Tiger Mask V in the early 2000s, but is not recognized as an official incarnation of the character. Ken Peale and Tommy Gilbert have also wrestled under the name "Tiger Mask" at certain points in their careers.

In 1971, Samson Kutsuwada portrayed Tiger Mask on one Japan Pro Wrestling Alliance tour of South Korea.

== Signature moves associated with the character ==
- Tiger suplex
- Double underhook transitioned maneuvers
- Space Flying Tiger Drop (Cartwheel suicide corkscrew crossbody)

== Championships and accomplishments ==
- Pro Wrestling Illustrated (PWI) ranked Mitsuharu Misawa's version of Tiger Mask No. 37 of the 500 best singles wrestlers during the PWI Years in 2003.
