= Donkey Kong (disambiguation) =

Donkey Kong is a video game franchise by Nintendo.

Donkey Kong may also refer to:

- Donkey Kong (1981 video game), an arcade video game released in 1981, later ported to many home consoles
- Donkey Kong (1994 video game), a Game Boy video game
- Donkey Kong (character), the title character
- Donkey Kong (Game & Watch), an LCD games featuring Mario
