= Mima Shimoda =

Japanese professional wrestler (born 1970)

Mima Shimoda 下田 美馬
Personal information
- Born: December 23, 1970 (age 55) Meguro - Tokyo, Japan

Professional wrestling career
- Ring name(s): Mima-chan; Mima Shimoda
- Billed height: 1.66 m (5 ft 5 1/2 in)
- Billed weight: 65 kg (143 lb)
- Trained by: Akira Hokuto; Jaguar Yokota
- Debut: August 5, 1987

Mima Shimoda (下田 美馬, Shimoda Mima; born on December 23, 1970, in Tokyo, Japan) is a Japanese professional wrestler, who is working for the Mexican professional wrestling promotion Consejo Mundial de Lucha Libre (CMLL) and Japanese promotion World Woman Pro-Wrestling Diana. She is most well known for being half of Las Cachorras Orientales with Etsuko Mita.

== Professional wrestling career ==
=== All Japan Women's Pro-Wrestling (1987-1997) ===
Shimoda debuted on August 5, 1987, against her future Las Cachorras Orientales partner, Etsuko Mita. Early on in her career, Shimoda formed the "Tokyo Sweethearts" with Manami Toyota.

On October 8, 1989, Shimoda won the AJW Junior Championship.

On August 19, 1990, Shimoda competed in a kickboxing match against Aja Kong. She lost several teeth during the match in defeat.

By 1991, the Tokyo Sweethearts had stopped teaming together regularly, however they would team off and on through the 1990s.

In 1992, Shimoda formed Las Cachorras Orientales (LCO) with Etsuko Mita and Akira Hokuto. While Hokuto was an original member, she did not stay on long as a regular with the team. The team mostly wrestled in the undercard until they captured both the JWP Tag Team Championship and the UWA World Women's Tag Team Championship in March 1994. The team held both sets of titles until January 8, 1995, when they lost their JWP Tag Team Championship to Hikari Fukuoka and Mayumi Ozaki. On September 2, 1995, they vacated their UWA World Women's Tag Team Championship after a successful defense against Lioness Asuka and Jaguar Yokota.

On May 11, 1996, the Tokyo Sweethearts teamed up again to take on "Double Inoue" of Kyoko Inoue and Takako Inoue. The match went 52 minutes with Double Inoue getting the win. On June 22, 1996, the teams re-matched with the Tokyo Sweethearts winning the WWWA World Tag Team Championship. They held the titles until January 20, 1997.

=== Late career (1997-present) ===
Shimoda left All Japan Women's Pro-Wrestling with Mita in October 1997 as the promotion filed for bankruptcy for NEO Japan Ladies Pro-Wrestling. Between October 1997 and February 1998, the team made stops in Ladies Legend Pro-Wrestling, JDStar and Gaea Japan while creating a rivalry with Kyoko Inoue and Misae Genki in NEO. The team also stopped in JWP later that year.

The team became freelance in 1999. They wrestled multiple matches for Gaea Japan eventually joining the heel faction, SSU(Super Star Unit). The also started to appear in Arsion during Summer 1999, winning the Twin Stars of Arsion League in December 1999. They also returned to All Japan Women's during this time, capturing the WWWA Tag Titles on July 10, 1999.

On June 18, 1997, the team captured the WWWA World Tag Team Championship for the first time by defeating Tomoko Watanabe and Kumiko Maekawa, finally capturing the titles after 5 years as a team.

In 2003, Shimoda retired to work in a backstage role with AtoZ Pro-Wrestling. The retirement did not last long as by 2005, she was wrestling regularly again after AtoZ's closure.

In 2006 Shimoda moved to Mexico and began working regularly for Consejo Mundial de Lucha Libre (CMLL) as well as making frequent trips to Japan to work with a number of Japanese women's promotions, often touring with other CMLL wrestlers.

On November 1, 2009, LCO teamed for the final time as Mita retired. They teamed against Kyoko Inoue and Nanae Takahashi. Mima continued to wrestle after.

== Championships and accomplishments ==
- All Japan Women's Pro-Wrestling
  - AJW Championship (1 time)
  - AJW Junior Championship (1 time)
  - AJW Tag Team Championship (1 time) – with Etsuko Mita
  - Tag League the Best (2000) – with Etsuko Mita
- Arsion
  - Queen of Arsion Championship (1 time)
  - Twin Star of Arsion Championship (2 times) – with Etsuko Mita (1), Michiko Omukai (1)
- JWP Joshi Puroresu
  - JWP Tag Team Championship (1 time) – with Etsuko Mita
- NEO Japan Ladies' Pro Wrestling
  - NWA Women's Pacific/NEO Single Championship (1 time)
- Tokyo Sports
  - Joshi Puroresu Grand Prize (2000) – with Etsuko Mita
- Universal Woman's Pro Wrestling Reina
  - Reina World Tag Team Championship (1 time) – with Zeuxis
- Universal Wrestling Association
  - UWA World Women's Tag Team Championship (2 times) – with Etsuko Mita
- World Woman Pro-Wrestling Diana
  - WWWD World Tag Team Championship (1 time) – with Kaoru
- World Women's Wrestling Association
  - WWWA World Tag Team Championship (7 times) – with Akira Hokuto (1), Manami Toyota (1), Takako Inoue (1) Etsuko Mita (4)

== Luchas de Apuestas record ==
Winner (wager)	Loser (wager)	Location	Event	Date	Notes
Mima Shimoda (hair)	Roza Azteca (mask)	Toluca, Mexico State	Live event	November 19, 2010	
