= Tomoko Watanabe =

Japanese softball player

Personal information
- Nationality: Japanese
- Born: 14 April 1971 (age 55) Aichi, Japan

Sport
- Sport: Softball

Tomoko Watanabe (渡辺伴子, Watanabe Tomoko; born 14 April 1971) is a Japanese softball player. She competed in the women's tournament at the 1996 Summer Olympics.
