= Aja Kong =

Japanese professional wrestler (born 1970)

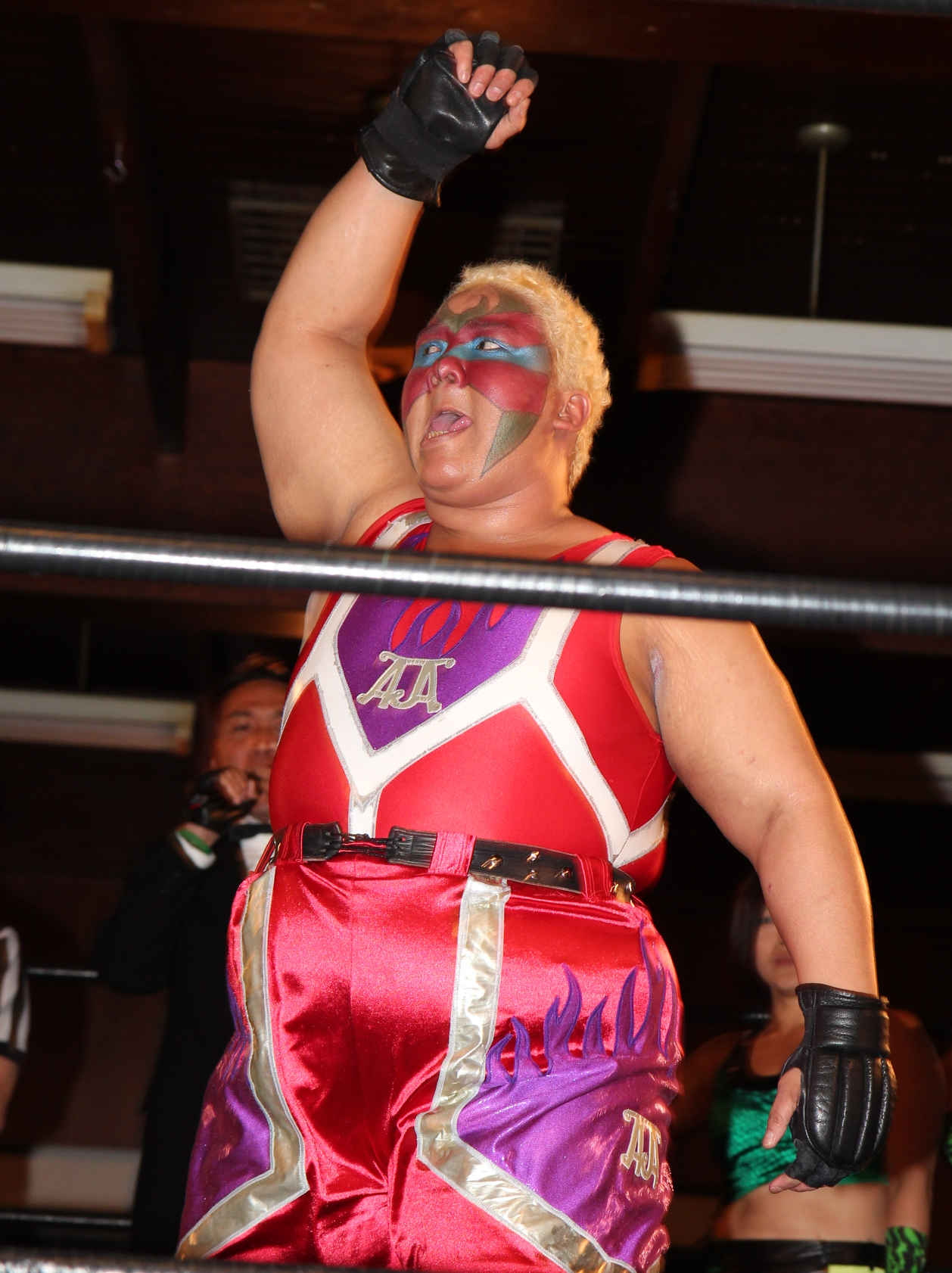
- Kong in 2015

Personal information
- Born: Erika Shishido (宍戸 江利花, Shishido Erika); September 25, 1970 (age 56) Akishima, Tokyo, Japan

Professional wrestling career
- Ring name(s): Aja Kong; Aja Shishido; AmeErika; Erika
- Billed height: 1.65 m (5 ft 5 in)
- Billed weight: 103 kg (227 lb)
- Billed from: Tokyo Tachikawa
- Trained by: Jaguar Yokota
- Debut: 1986

Erika Shishido (宍戸 江利花, Shishido Erika; born September 25, 1970) is a Japanese professional wrestler better known by her ring name Aja Kong (アジャ・コング, Aja Kongu). She currently makes appearances on the Japanese independent circuit and for Tokyo Joshi Pro-Wrestling (TJPW). She is the founder of the Arsion all-women professional wrestling promotion and has won several championships in both singles and tag-team divisions throughout her career, primarily while with All Japan Women's Pro-Wrestling.

== Early life ==
Born Erika Shishido, her mother is Japanese and her father, Henry Manigault, was an African-American who was a member of the US Army at Tachikawa Airfield. Although her parents were de facto married, they were forced to divorce when Erika was five years old, due to her father's sudden repatriation, and grew up in a single-mother family. Her mother was ostracized by all her relatives who did not like her relationship with Erika's father.

Erika and her mother moved from Tachikawa to Akishima, Tokyo, when Erika was in the 5th grade of elementary school. Erika started learning karate at the recommendation of her mother from elementary school. Erika was teased for her "mixed blood" and had fights almost daily, and she continued to suffer from serious bullying up until she graduated from junior high school. She was part of the volleyball club in her junior high school.

== Professional wrestling career ==
=== All Japan Women's Pro-Wrestling (1986–2005) ===
Shishido was trained by All Japan Women's Pro-Wrestling (AJW) and graduated as part of their class of 1986. She made her debut that summer against Noriyo Toyoda. She immediately joined Dump Matsumoto's heel stable Gokuaku Domei ("Atrocious Alliance"), along with classmate and tag team partner Nobuko Kimura. After the stable dissolved in 1988 due to Matsumoto's retirement, Shishido and Kimura went their separate ways, but re-formed in 1990 as Jungle Jack. Now called Aja Kong and Bison Kimura, they entered a two-year feud against their former allies Bull Nakano and her heel stable Gokumon-to. During their partnership they won the WWWA World Tag Team Championship twice. They lost a hair versus hair match on January 11, 1991, resulting in both women being shaved bald.

Kong herself also pursued Nakano for the WWWA World Single Championship during the early 1990s. She failed in several attempts before finally achieving her goal on November 15, 1992, ending Nakano's three-year reign.

=== World Wrestling Federation (1995) ===
In 1995, Kong made an appearance in the American World Wrestling Federation (WWF) as the sole survivor of a women's elimination match at the pay-per-view Survivor Series by pinning all four members of her opposing team, including WWF Women's Champion, Alundra Blayze. Kong also appeared on two episodes of Monday Night Raw and was victorious in both bouts. During one bout, she broke the nose of Chaparita ASARI.

Kong was being built up as a challenger for the WWF Women's Championship held by Alundra Blayze. Kong was scheduled to face Blayze at the Royal Rumble pay-per-view in January 1996, but the company elected to end its women's division after Alundra Blayze showed up on WCW Monday Nitro with the WWF Women's championship and threw the belt into a garbage can.

=== Arsion (1997–2004) ===
In 1997, Kong left AJW and started the independent promotion Hyper Visual Fighting Arsion (usually referred to as simply Arsion). She led the organization until February 12, 2001, when she walked out of a tag team match and announced she was quitting.

=== Freelance in Japan (2004–present) ===
On April 30, 2004, at the joshi promotion Gaea Japan's event Limit Break, Kong wrestled Amazing Kong in the latter's Japanese debut. Later in the night, the duo formed a tag team called W Kong. The duo defeated Chigusa Nagayo and Lioness Asuka for the AAAW Tag Team Championship on May 5. The team defended the championship all summer, eventually losing to Manami Toyota and Carlos Amano on September 20. They also held tag team championships in Japanese women's promotions AJW and Ladies Legend Pro-Wrestling. On June 6, 2006, wrestling as Erika and Margaret, the team defeated Wataru Sakata and Ryoji Sai for the Hustle Super Tag Team Championship. They lost the titles on October 9, 2006, to American tag team Bubba Ray and Devon in a three-way match which also included the team of Sodom and Gamora. On August 26, 2015, Kong reformed the W Kong tag team with Amazing Kong.

Kong also wrestled for Mayumi Ozaki's promotion, Oz Academy where she is affiliated with the Jungle Jack 21 stable. She has also held the promotion's championship.

=== Freelance in the United States (2011–2012, 2017–2019) ===
In December 2011, Kong took part in American promotion Chikara's JoshiMania weekend, losing to Sara Del Rey in the main event of night one on December 2. The following day, Kong defeated Ayako Hamada in the main event. On the third and final night of the tour, Kong teamed with Mio Shirai and Tsubasa Kuragaki to defeat Hanako Nakamori, Manami Toyota and Sawako Shimono in a six-woman tag team match.

Kong returned to the United States on April 11, 2015, working for Shimmer Women Athletes. Kong was brought in as a surprise to take part in Tomoka Nakagawa's retirement event.

On November 11, 2017, Kong returned to Shimmer Women Athletes joining the Trifecta heel stable with Mercedes Martinez and Nicole Savoy to replace the recently departed (for WWE) Shayna Baszler and appeared in matches the following night as well.

=== All Elite Wrestling (2019, 2021) ===
On May 25, 2019, Kong made her All Elite Wrestling (AEW) debut, as she teamed with Emi Sakura and Yuka Sakazaki where they unsuccessfully challenged the team of Hikaru Shida, Riho, and Ryo Mizunami. In February 2021, Kong was announced as a participant in a tournament for the AEW Women's World Championship as part of the Japanese bracket. Kong made it to the semi-finals, where she lost to Mizunami after being counted out.

== Personal life ==
Shishido's mother is Japanese and her father, who served in the military, is African American. Shishido has a half brother and sister via her father. She also has two nieces and two great nieces.

== Championships and accomplishments ==
- All Japan Women's Pro-Wrestling
  - AJW Championship (1 time)
  - AJW Tag Team Championship (1 time) – with Naboko Kimura
  - All Pacific Championship (1 time)
  - WWWA World Single Championship (2 times)
  - WWWA World Tag Team Championship (4 times) – with Amazing Kong (1), Bison Kimura (2) and Grizzly Iwamoto (1)
  - Japan Grand Prix (1992, 1996)
  - Tag League the Best (1992) – with Kyoko Inoue
  - AJW Hall of Fame (1998)
- Arsion
  - Queen of Arsion Championship (1 time)
  - Twin Star of Arsion Championship (1 time) – with Mariko Yoshida
- Dramatic Dream Team
  - KO-D 6-Man Tag Team Championship (1 time) – with Danshoku Dino and Makoto Oishi
  - Ironman Heavymetalweight Championship (7 times)
- GAEA Japan
  - AAAW Single Championship (3 times)
  - AAAW Tag Team Championship (3 times) – with Mayumi Ozaki (1), Devil Masami (1), and Amazing Kong (1)
- HUSTLE
  - HUSTLE Super Tag Team Championship (1 time) – with Margaret
- JWP Joshi Puroresu
  - JWP Tag Team Championship (1 time) – with Sachie Abe
- Ladies Legend Pro-Wrestling
  - LLPW Tag Team Championship (1 time) – with Amazing Kong
- Oz Academy
  - Oz Academy Openweight Championship (3 times)
  - Oz Academy Tag Team Championship (4 times) – with Hikaru Shida (1), Hiroyo Matsumoto (1), Kaoru Ito (1) and Sonoko Kato (1)
  - Oz Academy Openweight Championship Tournament (2007)
  - Best Wizard Award (5 times)
    - Best Bout Award (2011) vs. Mayumi Ozaki on April 10
    - Best Bout Award (2018) vs. Hikaru Shida on September 17
    - Best Singles Match Award (2012) vs. Ran Yu-Yu on October 14
    - Best Tag Team Match Award (2012) with Sonoko Kato vs. Akino and Ayumi Kurihara on August 19
    - MVP Award (2010)
- Sendai Girls' Pro Wrestling
  - Sendai Girls World Championship (1 time)
- Super Fireworks Pro Wrestling/Pro Wrestling Zero1
  - Blast Queen Championship (1 time, current)
- World Woman Pro-Wrestling Diana
  - WWWD World Championship (1 time)
- Wrestling Observer Newsletter awards
  - Wrestling Observer Newsletter Hall of Fame (Class of 2006)

== Luchas de Apuestas record ==
| Winner (wager) | Loser (wager) | Location | Event | Date | Notes |
|---|---|---|---|---|---|
| Bull Nakano & Kyoko Inoue (hair) | Aja Kong & Bison Kimura (hair) | Kawasaki, Kanagawa, Japan | AJW event | November 1, 1991 | |
