= Candy Okutsu =

Japanese professional wrestler

Personal information
- Born: Tomoko Okutsu; January 16, 1975 (age 51) Hiroshima, Japan

Professional wrestling career
- Ring name(s): Candy Okutsu; Tiger Dream; Red Lynx
- Billed height: 5 ft 1 in (155 cm)
- Billed weight: 128 lb (58 kg)
- Billed from: Hiroshima, Japan
- Trained by: Devil Masami
- Debut: August 4, 1992
- Retired: January 5, 2001

Tomoko Okutsu (奥津 智子, Okutsu Tomoko) (born January 16, 1975) is a Japanese retired professional wrestler, best known by her ring name Candy Okutsu (キャンディー奥津, Kyandī Okutsu). She is also known for her brief stint as Tiger Dream (タイガードリーム, Taigā Dorīmu), the female version of Tiger Mask.

== Career ==
Candy Okutsu made her professional wrestling debut on August 4, 1992, at the age of 17, for the JWP Joshi Puroresu. During her tenure there, she would go on to win the Junior Championship twice until she retired in 1997 due to what supposed to be a back injury, but Okutsu later revealed in her interview in July 2026 with Bull Nakano that the entire back injury was fictional, and the real motive was personal challenge, thus why she joined ARSION in December 1997, leaving her mentor Devil Masami in the dark, a move she'd say she still completely regrets to this day.

She made her comeback on February 18, 1998, and joined ARSION. Soon after her return, she was given then gimmick of Tiger Dream, the first female version of Tiger Mask. Okutsu retired from professional wrestling for the second and final time on January 5, 2001 due to burnout over the creative decisions and financial fiasco in ARSION by 2000.

For 23 years, Okutsu has disappeared from the professional wrestling spotlight, refusing any public appearances until July 2026, with her interview with pro wrestling legend, Bull Nakano.

== Championships and accomplishments ==
- All Japan Women's Pro-Wrestling
  - AJW Junior Championship (1 time)
- Arsion
  - ARS Tournament winner (1998)
  - Arsion Six Women Tag Team League (2000) - with Gami and Rie Tamada
- JWP Joshi Puroresu
  - JWP Junior Championship (2 times)
