= Mariko Yoshida =

Japanese professional wrestler

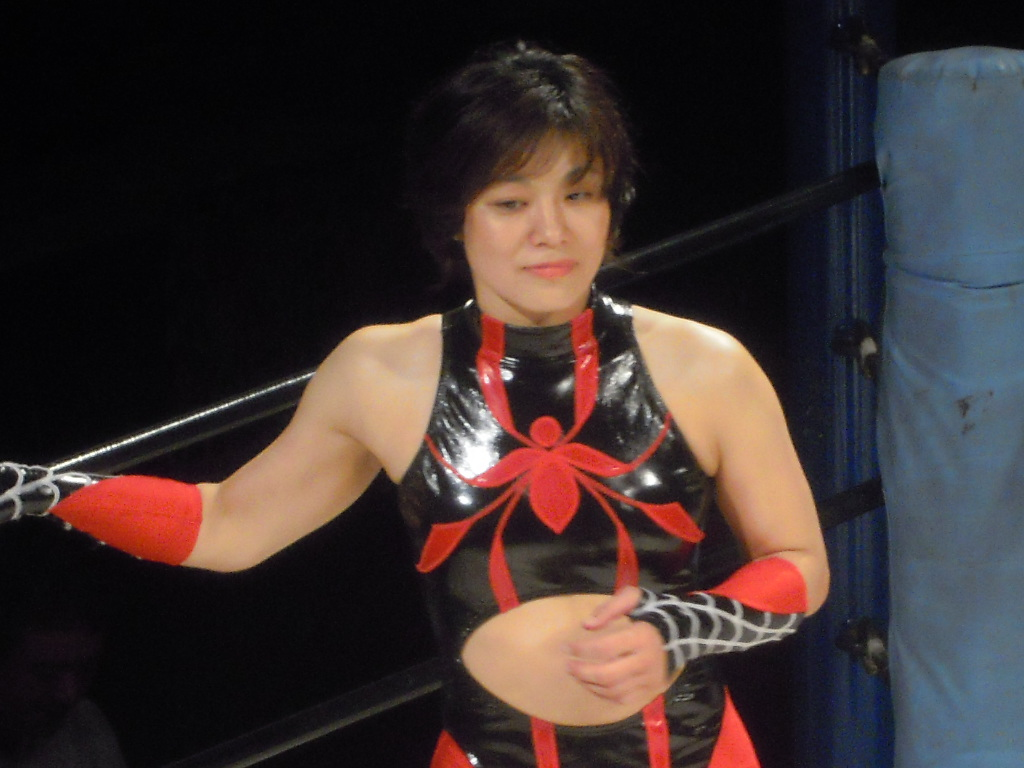
- Mariko Yoshida. Jungle Jack 21 June 12, 2011, Tokyo, Japan

Personal information
- Born: Mariko Morita; February 15, 1970 (age 56) Mukaishima, Hiroshima

Professional wrestling career
- Ring name: Mariko Yoshida
- Billed height: 1.63 m (5 ft 4 in)
- Billed weight: 63 kg (139 lb)
- Trained by: Jaguar Yokota
- Debut: October 10, 1988
- Retired: November 19, 2017

Mariko Morita (盛田 万里子, Morita Mariko; born February 15, 1970), better known by her ring name Mariko Yoshida (吉田 万里子, Yoshida Mariko), is a Japanese retired professional wrestler. She is best known for her work with the ARSION professional wrestling promotion, where she was also head trainer.

== Professional wrestling career ==
Yoshida debuted for All Japan Women's Pro-Wrestling (AJW or Zenjo) on October 10, 1988 at Tokyo's Korakuen Hall in a match against Keiko Waki. Before her neck injury in late 1992, which would cause her to miss two years of ring time, Yoshida was easily one of the best young stars in AJW, often showcasing Lucha Libre-inspired aerial maneuvers to go along with her mat-work skills.

In 1997, she left AJW to join Aja Kong's Arsion promotion, becoming their head trainer. There she was repackaged as a technical wrestling master, and pushed as a major star. She has been nicknamed ARSION no Shinjutsu, or "Arsion True Heart". Forgoing the high-flying techniques of her run in Zenjo, her style in Arsion was centered on mat wrestling and submission holds derived from shoot wrestling, along with more elaborate lucha-inspired submissions.

In June 2005, she launched Ibuki, a bi-monthly event series, with her intention to provide opportunities for young, up and coming wrestlers from different promotions to compete with each other and to challenge senior wrestlers like Yoshida herself. Ibuki has now gained high reputation among joshi puroresu fans in Japan.

In 2006, Yoshida was presented with the Cauliflower Alley Club's Future Legend Award, becoming only the second female after Cheerleader Melissa, to win this award.

Yoshida retired from professional wrestling on November 19, 2017, losing to her trainee Hiroyo Matsumoto in her final match.

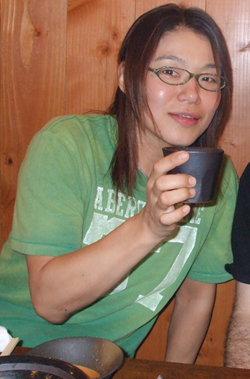
Yoshida photographed at home in 2008.

== Professional wrestling style and persona ==
Yoshida employed a submission-based style, based on her shoot wrestling training. Yoshida is the innovator of two finishing moves, an over-the-shoulder back-to-belly piledriver, which she calls the Air Raid Crash and a headscissors shoulder lock, which she has named the Spider Twist. Among her signature moves are the arm wrench inside cradle, a Cross armbar, sometimes proceeded by an Oklahoma roll, a lifting double underhook facebuster, a running big boot and a triangle choke. She uses "Fable" by Robert Miles as her theme song.

== Championships and accomplishments ==
- All Japan Women's Pro-Wrestling
  - AJW Championship (1 time)
  - AJW Tag Team Championship (3 times) – with Takako Inoue (2) and Rie Tamada (1)
- Arsion
  - Queen of Arsion Championship (3 times)
  - Twin Star of Arsion Championship (2 times) – with Aja Kong (1) and Lioness Asuka (1)
  - Zion '98
- BattlARTS
  - King And Queens Tournament (2000) – with Alexander Otsuka and Yumi Fukawa
- Cauliflower Alley Club
  - Future Legend Award (2006)
- ChickFight
  - ChickFight II
  - ChickFight III
- Consejo Mundial de Lucha Libre
  - CMLL World Women's Championship (1 time)
