= Devil Masami =

Japanese professional wrestler (born 1962)

Personal information
- Born: Masami Yoshida; January 7, 1962 (age 64) Kitakyushu, Japan

Professional wrestling career
- Ring name(s): Devil Masami; Madama Devil; Shizuka Minami; Super Heel Devil Masami
- Billed height: 1.68 m (5 ft 6 in)
- Billed weight: 70 kg (154 lb)
- Trained by: AJW Dojo
- Debut: August 21, 1978
- Retired: December 30, 2008

Masami Yoshida (吉田 雅美，born January 7, 1962) is a retired Japanese professional wrestler best known for her appearances in All Japan Women's Pro Wrestling, GAEA Japan and JWP Joshi Puroresu under the name Devil Masami. She is a member of the All Japan Women's Pro Wrestling Hall of Fame, being inducted in 1998.

== Professional wrestling career ==
=== All Japan Women's Pro-Wrestling (1978–1987) ===
Masami debuted on August 21, 1978.

She began teaming with Tarantula in 1981, winning the WWWA World Tag Team Championship on August 10, 1982 and vacating the title shortly thereafter in early 1983. On April 1, 1984, she defeated Judy Martin to win the vacated All Pacific Championship. Masami vacated on December 12, 1985 after winning the vacated WWWA World Single Championship in a match against Dump Matsumoto. She held that title until August 23, 1986, losing it to Yukari Omori. On December 26, 1987, Masami faced Chigusa Nagayo in her mandatory retirement match upon reaching the age of 25. Masami would continue wrestling as a freelancer shortly after her retirement, wrestling for Japan Women's Pro-Wrestling and JWP.

=== GAEA Japan (1995–2005) ===
She then came out of retirement and began working for GAEA Japan in 1995. On November 2, 1996 in Singapore, Chigusa Nagayo defeated Masami in a match to crown the first AAAW Single Champion. Masami, however, defeated Nagayo for the title on November 20, 1997, holding it until August 23, 1998, when Nagayo defeated her to regain the title.

On September 20, 1997 in Kawasaki, Japan, she defeated Zero (Chigusa Nagayo) for World Championship Wrestling's vacant WCW Women's Championship. The title, however, was abandoned after GAEA and WCW ceased their working relationship.

On February 11, 2003 she teamed with Aja Kong to defeat the team of Meiko Satomura and Ayako Hamada for the AAAW Tag Team Championship. They held the title until they were defeated by Chikayo Nagashima and Meiko Satomura on September 23 of that year.

=== All Japan Women's Pro-Wrestling (2005–2008) ===
Masami wrestled in the main event of AJW's final card on April 17, 2005, teaming up with Amazing Kong to defeat Kyoko Inoue and Misae Genki.

Masami announced in 2007 that she would retire from wrestling in 2008 after thirty years in the business. Her retirement match was on December 30, 2008 where she teamed up with Dynamite Kansai and Carlos Amano to lose to Aja Kong, Toshie Uematsu, and Ran Yu-Yu, when Uematsu pinned Masami with a Dragon Suplex.

== Championships and accomplishments ==
- All Japan Women's Pro Wrestling
  - AJW Championship (1 time)
  - All Pacific Championship (1 time)
  - WWWA World Single Championship (1 time)
  - WWWA World Tag Team Championship (1 time) – with Tarantula
  - Hall of Fame (1998)
  - Fuji TV Cup Tournament
- GAEA Japan
  - AAAW Single Championship (1 time) (Note: Masami won the championship when it was called the AAAW Heavyweight Championship. In May 1998, the title was re-named as the AAAW Single Championship.)
  - AAAW Tag Team Championship (1 time) – with Aja Kong
- JWP Joshi Puroresu
  - JWP Openweight Championship (1 time)
  - JWP Tag Team Championship (3 time) – with Cutie Suzuki (1), Dynamite Kansai (1) and Hikari Fukuoka (1)
- Universal Wrestling Association
  - UWA International Women's Championship (1 time)
- World Championship Wrestling
  - WCW Women's Championship (1 time)
- Wrestling Observer Newsletter
  - Hall of Fame (Class of 1996)
