= Ryo Mizunami =

Japanese professional wrestler

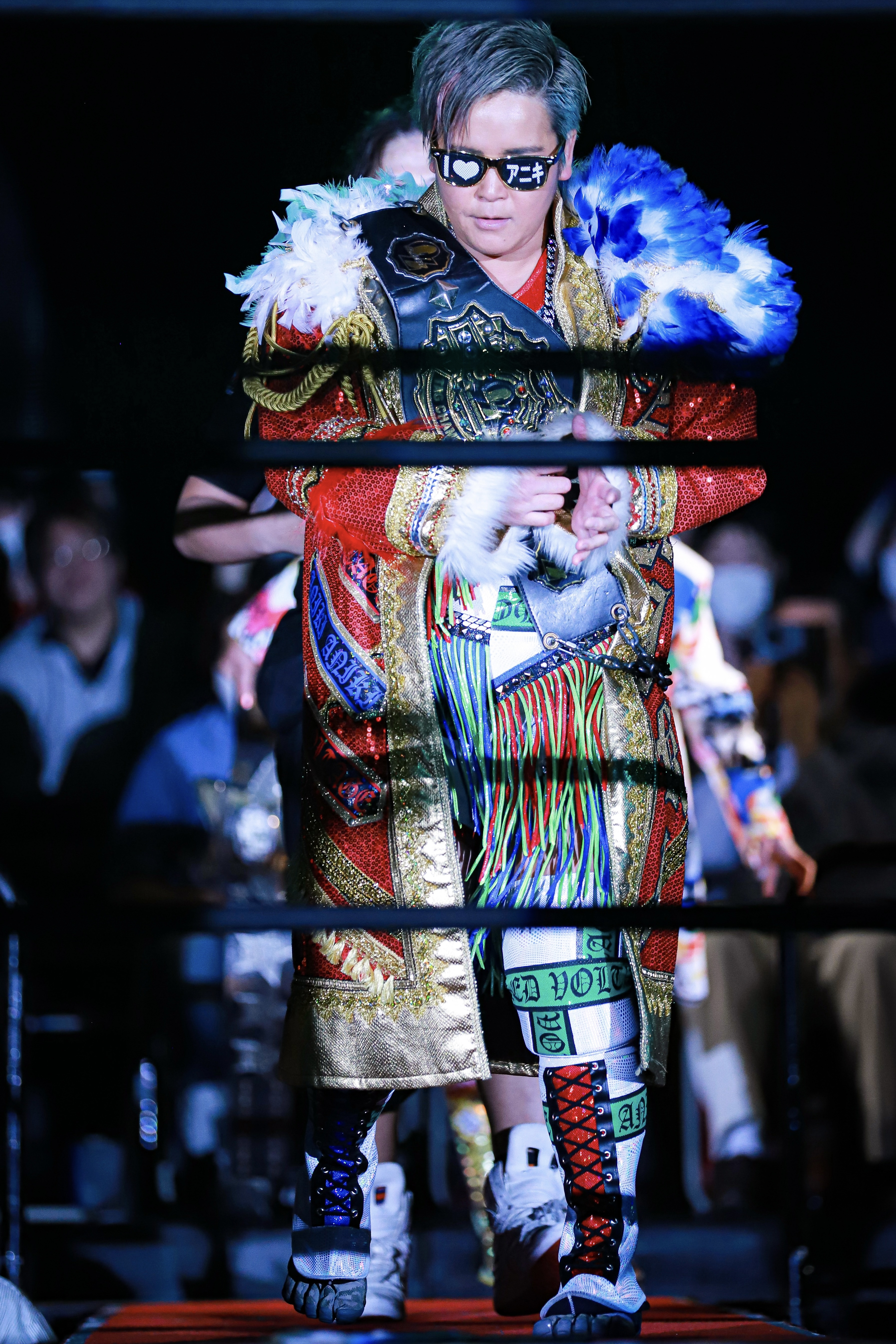
- Mizunami in April 2023

Personal information
- Born: Ayane Mizumura; March 24, 1988 (age 38) Nagoya, Aichi Prefecture, Japan

Professional wrestling career
- Ring name(s): Aniki; Ayane Mizumura; Aya Mizunami; Ryo Mizunami
- Billed height: 5 ft 3 in (160cm)
- Billed weight: 147 lb (67 kg)
- Billed from: Nagoya, Japan
- Trained by: Meiko Satomura
- Debut: November 3, 2004

Ayane Mizumura (水村 綾菜, Mizumura Ayane; born March 24, 1988), better known by her ring name Ryo Mizunami (水波綾, Mizunami Ryō), is a Japanese professional wrestler and mixed martial artist. She is best known for her time in Pro Wrestling Wave. She is also known for her appearances in other Japanese promotions such as Big Japan Pro-Wrestling, Sendai Girls' Pro Wrestling, Ice Ribbon, Oz Academy and Seadlinnng amongst others, as well as American promotions like All Elite Wrestling (AEW) and Shimmer Women Athletes, and Northern Championship Wrestling in Canada.

== Professional wrestling career ==
Mizumura started her professional wrestling career in 2004 with Gaea Japan under her birth name. She made her in-ring debut on November 3 in which she lost to Carlos Amano.

=== Pro Wrestling Wave (2009–2019) ===
Mizunami made her debut for Pro Wrestling Wave in April 2009 as part of a gauntlet battle royal for the DDT Ironman Heavymetalweight Championship.

=== All Elite Wrestling (2019, 2021–present) ===
In 2019, Mizunami made her debut for the newly formed American promotion All Elite Wrestling (AEW) at their inaugural event Double or Nothing in Las Vegas in which Mizunami, Hikaru Shida and Riho defeated the team of Yuka Sakazaki, Aja Kong and Emi Sakura. Mizunami later revealed that she was considering retirement but changed her mind after her appearance at Double or Nothing.

In 2021, Mizunami was announced as a participant in the AEW Women's Championship Eliminator Tournament as part of the Japanese bracket. In the opening round of the Japanese side of the bracket, Mizunami defeated Maki Itoh via submission on February 15. On February 22, Mizunami picked up a count-out victory over Aja Kong to advance to the Japanese finals. She won the Japanese bracket after defeating Yuka Sakazaki on an all-women's B/R Live special on February 28. On the March 3 edition of AEW Dynamite, Mizunami defeated Nyla Rose in the finals, winning the AEW Women's Championship Eliminator Tournament. For winning the tournament, Mizunami challenged Shida for the AEW Women's World Championship on March 7 at Revolution, but was unsuccessful. Three days later, on the following Dynamite, Mizunami teamed with Shida and Thunder Rosa where they defeated Nyla Rose, Maki Itoh and Dr. Britt Baker, D.M.D.

== Mixed martial arts record ==
Professional record breakdown
1 match	0 wins	1 loss
By knockout	0	0
By submission	0	1
By decision	0	0

Res.	Record	Opponent	Method	Event	Date	Round	Time	Location	Notes
Loss	0–1	Seo Hee Ham	Submission (armbar)	Gladiator: Dream, Power and Hope	April 21, 2013	1	1:05	Sapporo, Japan	For the CMA/KPW Women's Lightweight Championship.

== Championships and accomplishments ==
- All Elite Wrestling
  - AEW Women's World Championship Eliminator Tournament (2021)
- Ice Ribbon
  - International Ribbon Tag Team Championship (1 time) - with Misaki Ohata
- JWP Joshi Puroresu
  - JWP Junior Championship (1 time)
  - Princess of Pro-Wrestling Championship (1 time)
- Marvelous That's Women Pro Wrestling
  - AAAW Tag Team Championship (1 time) – with Sonoko Kato
- NEO Japan Ladies Pro-Wrestling
  - NEO Tag Team Championship (1 time) - with Aya Yuuki
- Oz Academy
  - Oz Academy Openweight Championship (1 time)
  - Oz Academy Tag Team Championship (2 times) – with Sonoko Kato
  - Oz Academy Pioneer 3-Way Championship (1 time, current)
  - New Year's Makenokori Majiten Tournament (2024)
  - Best Wizard Award (1 time)
    - MVP Award (2024)
- Pro Wrestling Illustrated
  - Ranked No. 124 of the top 250 female wrestlers in the PWI Women's 250 in 2024
- Pro Wrestling Wave
  - Wave Single Championship (2 times)
  - Wave Tag Team Championship (1 time) - with Misaki Ohata
  - Catch the Wave (2016)
  - Regina Di Wave Championship Next One Day Tournament (2018)
  - Catch the Wave Award (3 times)
    - Best Bout Award (2013) vs. Ayako Hamada on May 26
    - Best Bout Award (2015) vs. Yumi Ohka on June 10
    - Fighting Spirit Award (2015)
- Seadlinnng
  - Beyond the Sea Single Championship (1 time)
- Sendai Girls' Pro Wrestling
  - Sendai Girls Tag Team Championship (2 times, current) – with Manami
  - New Year One Night Tournament (2008)
- Tokyo Joshi Pro-Wrestling
  - Princess Tag Team Championship (1 time) – with Yuki Aino
  - Tokyo Princess Cup (2024)
