= Sonoko Kato =

Japanese professional wrestler

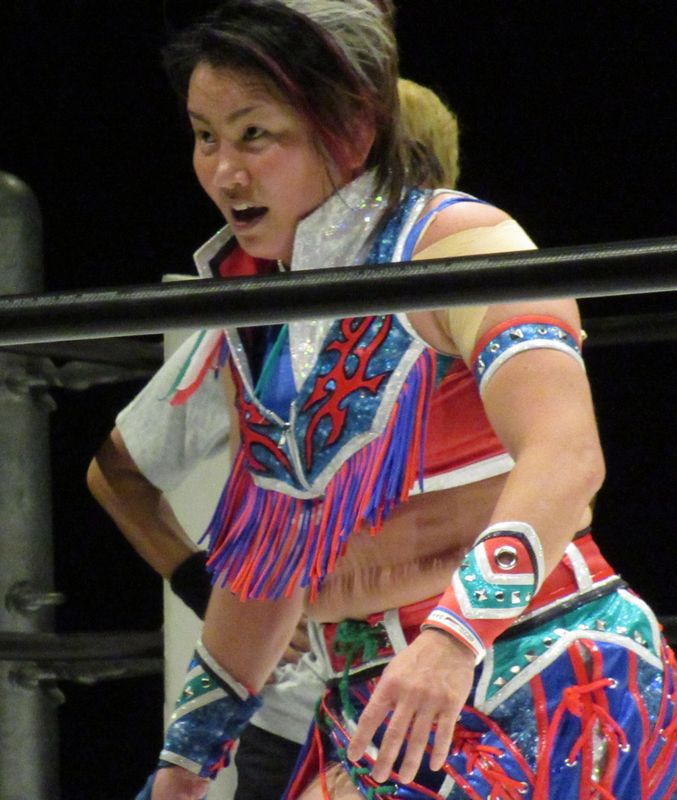
- Kato in July 2020

Personal information
- Born: Sonoko Kato; June 11, 1976 (age 50) Kasugai, Aichi

Professional wrestling career
- Ring name: Sonoko Kato
- Billed height: 1.58 m (5 ft 2 in)
- Billed weight: 65 kg (143 lb)
- Trained by: Chigusa Nagayo
- Debut: April 15, 1995
- Retired: November 23, 2025

Sonoko Kato (加藤 園子, Katō Sonoko; born June 11, 1976) is a Japanese retired professional wrestler. She made her debut in April 1995, working for Gaea Japan, where she became one half of the inaugural AAAW Junior Heavyweight Tag Team Champions. After becoming a two-time winner of the High Spurt 600 Tournament, Kato's career came to a halt following multiple injuries. After being sidelined for five years, Kato returned to the ring in October 2006, following the folding of Gaea Japan, and found a new home in the Oz Academy promotion, where she is a former two-time Oz Academy Openweight Champion and seven-time Oz Academy Tag Team Champion. Kato has also wrestled in the US for World Championship Wrestling (WCW) and in Mexico for Lucha Libre AAA World Wide (AAA).

== Professional wrestling career ==
=== Gaea Japan (1994–2005) ===
Kato had an excessive sports history in her childhood, practising track and field and volleyball in elementary school, handball in junior high school and javelin in high school. Despite her father's objections, she eventually followed her childhood dream, to be a professional wrestler, and took part in a professional wrestling audition held by Chigusa Nagayo. After passing the audition, Kato began training with Nagayo in October 1994. She made her debut on April 15, 1995, facing fellow debutante Meiko Satomura at the first ever event held by Nagayo's Gaea Japan promotion. Just before the debut match, Kato's father, whom Nagayo had managed to convince to support his daughter's dream of becoming a professional wrestler, died in a traffic accident. On November 2, 1996, Kato and Satomura became the inaugural AAAW Junior Heavyweight Tag Team Champions. Through Gaea Japan's working relationship with World Championship Wrestling (WCW), Kato made her American debut on November 29, 1996, in Wheeling, West Virginia, losing to Kaoru in a WCW Women's Championship tournament match. Kato returned to WCW in April 1997 to take part in a tournament to determine the inaugural WCW Women's Cruiserweight Champion, losing to Malia Hosaka in her semifinal match. On December 27, 1997, Kato won the High Spurt 600 Tournament, defeating Chikayo Nagashima in the finals. After a sixteen-month reign, Kato and Satomura lost the AAAW Junior Heavyweight Tag Team Championship to Chikayo Nagashima and Sugar Sato on March 29, 1998. After winning the High Spurt 600 Tournament for a second time in 1999, Kato began suffering from various injuries which sidelined her from late 1999 to July 2000 and again from February 2001 to 2006. During the time, Kato kept making non-wrestling appearances for Gaea Japan, including getting attacked and having her hair cut by the villainous D-Fix stable in late 2002. When Gaea Japan went out of business in 2005, Kato was uncertain whether she would ever wrestle again.

=== Oz Academy (2006–2025) ===
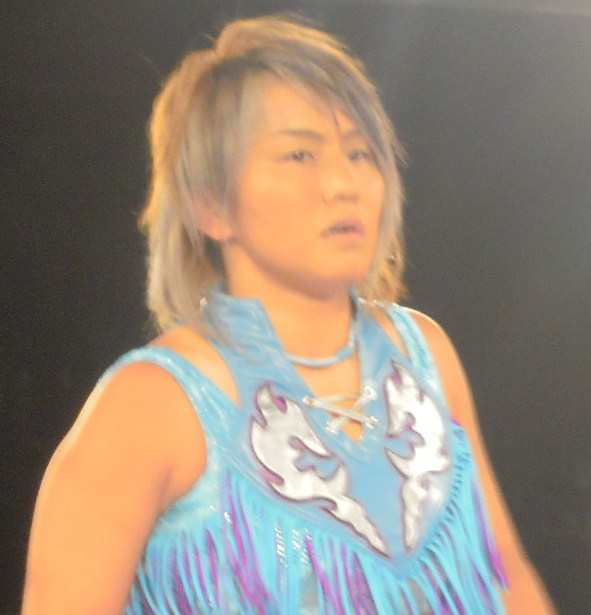
Kato in July 2010

Kato finally returned to the ring at an independent event produced by Chigusa Nagayo on October 1, 2006. Kato then began working regularly for the Oz Academy promotion, which featured many other former Gaea Japan wrestlers. On May 25, 2008, Kato made her Mexican debut for Lucha Libre AAA World Wide (AAA), taking part in a five-way elimination Reina de Reinas Tournament match, from which she was eliminated by Martha Villalobos. The following July, Kato and Chikayo Nagashima made it to the finals of a tournament to determine the inaugural Oz Academy Tag Team Champions, before losing to Carlos Amano and Dynamite Kansai. Kato and Nagashima eventually won the title from Aja Kong and Hiroyo Matsumoto on February 22, 2009. During the next eighteen months, Kato and Nagashima won the title two more times, becoming three-time champions together. Kato won the title for the fourth time on January 15, 2012, this time teaming with Aja Kong. After a seven-month reign, they lost the title to Akino and Ayumi Kurihara. On January 12, 2014, Kato received a shot at the Oz Academy Openweight Championship, but was defeated by the defending champion, Akino. The following June, Kato underwent a shoulder surgery, which would sideline her for an estimated six months. She returned to the ring on January 11, 2015. On February 8, Kato formed a new stable with Akino, Kagetsu and Kaho Kobayashi, which was on April 15 named "Mission K4" (MK4). On August 23, Kato won the first singles title of her twenty-year career, when she defeated Hiroyo Matsumoto in a Last Woman Standing match to win the vacant Oz Academy Openweight Championship. On October 10, Kato returned to the United States, when she made her debut for Shimmer Women Athletes, taking part in their two-day tenth anniversary weekend. After four successful title defenses, Kato was stripped of the Oz Academy Openweight Championship on April 24, 2016, when her defense against Hiroyo Matsumoto ended in a no contest. On July 18, Kato defeated Mayumi Ozaki to regain the vacant Oz Academy Openweight Championship. On November 13 at Oz Academy's 20th anniversary event, Kato lost the Oz Academy Openweight Championship to Hiroyo Matsumoto in her second defense.

== Championships and accomplishments ==
- Gaea Japan/Marvelous That's Women Pro Wrestling
  - AAAW Junior Heavyweight Tag Team Championship (2 times) – with Meiko Satomura (1) and Ryo Mizunami (1)
  - High Spurt 600 Tournament (1997, 1999)
- Oz Academy
  - Oz Academy Openweight Championship (3 times)
  - Oz Academy Tag Team Championship (7 times) – with Aja Kong (1), Akino (1), Chikayo Nagashima (3) and Ryo Mizunami (2)
  - Oz Academy Pioneer 3-Way Championship (1 time)
  - Best Wizard Award (6 times)
    - Best Bout Award (2015) with Akino and Tsubasa Kuragaki vs. Arisa Nakajima, Hikaru Shida and Hiroyo Matsumoto on August 23
    - Best Bout Award (2016) vs. Hiroyo Matsumoto on November 13
    - Best Tag Team Match Award (2010) with Chikayo Nagashima vs. Akino and Ran Yu-Yu on August 22
    - Best Tag Team Match Award (2011) with Chikayo Nagashima vs. Hiroyo Matsumoto and Tomoka Nakagawa on January 9
    - Best Tag Team Match Award (2012) with Aja Kong vs. Akino and Ayumi Kurihara on August 19
    - MVP Award (2015)
