= Oz Academy Openweight Championship =

Professional wrestling women's championship

- Current design of the championship (2019 – present)

Details
- Promotion: Oz Academy
- Date established: October 23, 2006
- Current champion: Hiroyo Matsumoto
- Date won: February 8, 2026
Statistics
- First champion: Aja Kong
- Most reigns: Mayumi Ozaki (4 reigns)
- Longest reign: Akino (537 days)
- Shortest reign: Mio Shirai (4 hours, 2 minutes)
- Oldest champion: Mayumi Ozaki (55 years, 183 days)
- Youngest champion: Yoshiko (24 years, 95 days)
- Heaviest champion: Aja Kong (103 kg (227 lb)))
- Lightest champion: Chikayo Nagashima (52 kg (115 lb)))

The Oz Academy Openweight Championship is a women's professional wrestling championship owned by the Oz Academy promotion. The reigning champion is referred to as the "Wizard of Oz". The championship, which is situated at the top of Oz Academy's championship hierarchy, was introduced on March 10, 2007, when Aja Kong defeated Chikayo Nagashima in the finals of a tournament to become the inaugural champion.

== Reigns ==
Aja Kong was the first champion in the title's history. She also holds the records for most reigns, with three. Akino holds the record for the longest reign, at 537 days, achieved on her first reign. Mio Shirai's only reign of four hours and two minutes is the shortest in the title's history. Overall, there have been a total of thirty-three reigns shared among twenty different wrestlers. Hiroyo Matsumoto is the current champion in her second reign.

== Title history ==
Key
| No. | Overall reign number |
| Reign | Reign number for the specific champion |
| Days | Number of days held |
| Defenses | Number of successful defenses |
| + | Current reign is changing daily |

| No. | Champion | Championship change | | | Reign statistics | | | Notes | Ref. |
| No. | Champion | Date | Event | Location | Reign | Days | Defenses | Notes | Ref. |
|---|---|---|---|---|---|---|---|---|---|
| 1 | Aja Kong | March 10, 2007 | Queen Rebirth | Tokyo, Japan | 1 | 309 | 1 | Kong defeated Chikayo Nagashima in the finals of a five-woman tournament to become the inaugural champion. | |
| 2 | Carlos Amano | January 13, 2008 | The Wizard of OZ 2008 | Tokyo, Japan | 1 | 364 | 2 | | |
| 3 | Mayumi Ozaki | January 11, 2009 | The Wizard of OZ 2009 | Tokyo, Japan | 1 | 42 | 2 | | |
| 4 | Dynamite Kansai | February 22, 2009 | The Country of OZ 2009 | Tokyo, Japan | 1 | 175 | 0 | | |
| 5 | Aja Kong | August 16, 2009 | Plum Hanasaku ~ Country of OZ 2009 | Tokyo, Japan | 2 | 36 | 0 | | |
| 6 | Manami Toyota | September 21, 2009 | OZ-Power is Everything - night 1 | Sapporo, Hokkaido, Japan | 1 | 93 | 0 | | |
| 7 | Carlos Amano | December 23, 2009 | here is No Christmas in the Country of OZ! | Tokyo, Japan | 2 | 200 | 1 | | |
| 8 | Kaoru | July 11, 2010 | Summer Factor | Tokyo, Japan | 1 | 273 | 4 | | |
| — | Vacated | April 10, 2011 | — | — | — | — | — | The championship was vacated, when Kaoru suffered an injury and was unable to continue a three-way street fight against Aja Kong and Mayumi Ozaki, forcing the match to be ended in a no contest. | |
| 9 | Aja Kong | April 10, 2011 | One Night in Heaven | Tokyo, Japan | 3 | 19 | 0 | Kong defeated Mayumi Ozaki to win the vacant championship. | |
| 10 | Ran Yu-Yu | April 29, 2011 | Heavenly Days in Osaka | Osaka, Japan | 1 | 86 | 0 | | |
| 11 | Dynamite Kansai | July 24, 2011 | Gravity | Tokyo, Japan | 2 | 28 | 0 | | |
| 12 | Mayumi Ozaki | August 21, 2011 | Plum Hanasaku ~ Country of OZ 2011 - night 2: 15th Anniversary ~ Yokohama Dreams Park | Yokohama, Kanagawa, Japan | 2 | 217 | 0 | This was a four-way elimination match, also involving Aja Kong and Shinobu Kandori. | |
| 13 | Chikayo Nagashima | March 25, 2012 | A Kingdom of the Chaos | Tokyo, Japan | 1 | 395 | 2 | This was a Dress Up Wild Fight 30-minute Time of the Trial match. | |
| 14 | Akino | April 24, 2013 | Wednesdays Showdown | Tokyo, Japan | 1 | 537 | 7 | | |
| 15 | Tsubasa Kuragaki | October 13, 2014 | No Answer | Tokyo, Japan | 1 | 216 | 2 | | |
| 16 | Akino | May 17, 2015 | Reincarnation - night 2 | Tokyo, Japan | 2 | 21 | 0 | | |
| 17 | Mio Shirai | June 7, 2015 | Focus - night 1 | Tokyo, Japan | 1 | <1 | 0 | | |
| — | Vacated | June 7, 2015 | Ozabun Spin-off | Tokyo, Japan | — | — | — | Mio Shirai vacated the championship due to losing to Kaho Kobayashi in a non-title match. | |
| 18 | Sonoko Kato | August 23, 2015 | Plum Hanasaku ~ Country Of OZ 2015: Yokohama Dreams Park #3 | Yokohama, Kanagawa, Japan | 1 | 245 | 5 | Kato defeated Hiroyo Matsumoto in a Last Woman Standing match to win the vacant championship. The match started off as a six-woman elimination tag team match, where Kato, Akino and Tsubasa Kuragaki faced Matsumoto, Arisa Nakajima and Hikaru Shida. | |
| — | Vacated | April 24, 2016 | The Artist | Tokyo, Japan | — | — | — | Kato was stripped of the championship after her title defense against Hiroyo Matsumoto ended in a no contest. | |
| 19 | Sonoko Kato | July 18, 2016 | Aja Kong 30th Anniversary ~ Summer Jumbo Kotobuki | Tokyo, Japan | 2 | 118 | 1 | Kato defeated Mayumi Ozaki in a No Holds Barred Hardcore match to win the vacant championship. | |
| 20 | Hiroyo Matsumoto | November 13, 2016 | OZ Academy 20th Anniversary ~ Yokohama Dreams Park DK | Yokohama, Kanagawa, Japan | 1 | 350 | 3 | | |
| 21 | Yoshiko | October 29, 2017 | Yokohama Undersea Unexplored Expedition | Yokohama, Kanagawa, Japan | 1 | 217 | 4 | | |
| 22 | Hikaru Shida | June 3, 2018 | Rude in June | Tokyo, Japan | 1 | 315 | 2 | | |
| 23 | Mayumi Ozaki | April 14, 2019 | It is the Dawn of the Era | Tokyo, Japan | 3 | 721 | 4 | | |
| 24 | Sonoko Kato | April 4, 2021 | OZ Academy Silver Bullet | Tokyo, Japan | 3 | 70 | 1 | | |
| 25 | Kaori Yoneyama | June 13, 2021 | OZ Academy The End Of Bright | Tokyo, Japan | 1 | 35 | 1 | | |
| 26 | Maya Yukihi | July 18, 2021 | OZ Academy Tournament 25th Fortress | Nagoya, Japan | 1 | <1 | 0 | | |
| — | Vacated | July 18, 2021 | — | — | — | — | — | | |
| 27 | Maya Yukihi | August 18, 2021 | OZ Academy Plum No Hanasaku OZ No Kuni ~ Mayumi Ozaki Debut 35th Anniversary | Tokyo, Japan | 2 | 228 | 1 | This was a four-way match, also involving Mayumi Ozaki, Saori Anou and Yumi Ohka. | |
| 28 | Akino | April 3, 2022 | OZ Academy Battle Big Bonus In Korakuen | Tokyo, Japan | 3 | 644 | 6 | | |
| 29 | Mio Momono | January 7, 2024 | OZ Academy The Wizard Of OZ 2024 | Tokyo, Japan | 1 | 112 | 0 | | |
| 30 | Mayumi Ozaki | April 28, 2024 | OZ Academy Battle Big Bonus 2024 | Tokyo, Japan | 4 | 182 | 3 | This was a winner takes all match which was also contested for Ozaki's AAAW Single Championship. | |
| 31 | Ryo Mizunami | October 27, 2024 | OZ Academy at Yokohama Budokan 2024 | Tokyo, Japan | 1 | 168 | 1 | The winner of the Yokohama Budokan Tournament Kyoto Ranbu got to challenge for the title. | |
| 32 | Saori Anou | April 13, 2025 | OZ Academy Battle Big Bonus 2025 | Tokyo, Japan | 1 | 301 | 1 | | |
| 33 | Hiroyo Matsumoto | February 8, 2026 | OZ Academy OZ 30th & Ozaki 40th: Blooming With Pride | Tokyo, Japan | 2 | 268+ | 1 | | |

== Combined reigns ==
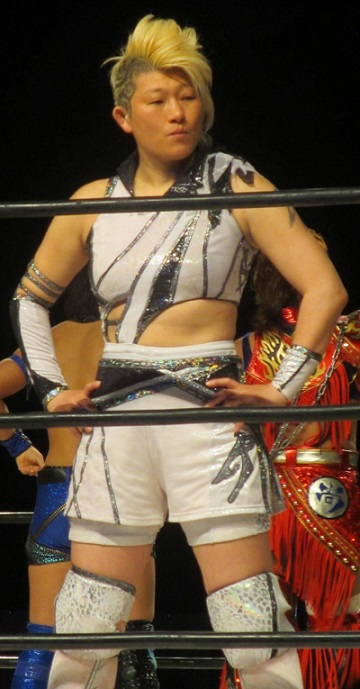
Three-time champion Akino, who is the longest combined-reigning champion at 1,202 days.

As of November 3, 2026.

| † | Indicates the current champion |

| Rank | Wrestler | No. of reigns | Combined defenses | Combined days |
|---|---|---|---|---|
| 1 | Akino | 3 | 13 | 1,202 |
| 2 | Mayumi Ozaki | 4 | 9 | 1,172 |
| 3 | Hiroyo Matsumoto † | 2 | 4 | 618+ |
| 4 | Carlos Amano | 2 | 3 | 564 |
| 5 | Sonoko Kato | 3 | 7 | 433 |
| 6 | Chikayo Nagashima | 1 | 2 | 395 |
| 7 | Aja Kong | 3 | 1 | 364 |
| 8 | Hikaru Shida | 1 | 2 | 315 |
| 9 | Saori Anou | 1 | 1 | 301 |
| 10 | Kaoru | 1 | 4 | 273 |
| 11 | Maya Yukihi | 2 | 1 | 228 |
| 12 | Yoshiko | 1 | 4 | 217 |
| 13 | Tsubasa Kuragaki | 1 | 2 | 216 |
| 14 | Dynamite Kansai | 2 | 0 | 203 |
| 15 | Ryo Mizunami | 1 | 1 | 168 |
| 16 | Mio Momono | 1 | 0 | 112 |
| 17 | Manami Toyota | 1 | 0 | 93 |
| 18 | Ran Yu-Yu | 1 | 0 | 86 |
| 19 | Kaori Yoneyama | 1 | 1 | 35 |
| 20 | Mio Shirai | 1 | 0 | <1 |
