= Mio Momono =

Japanese professional wrestler

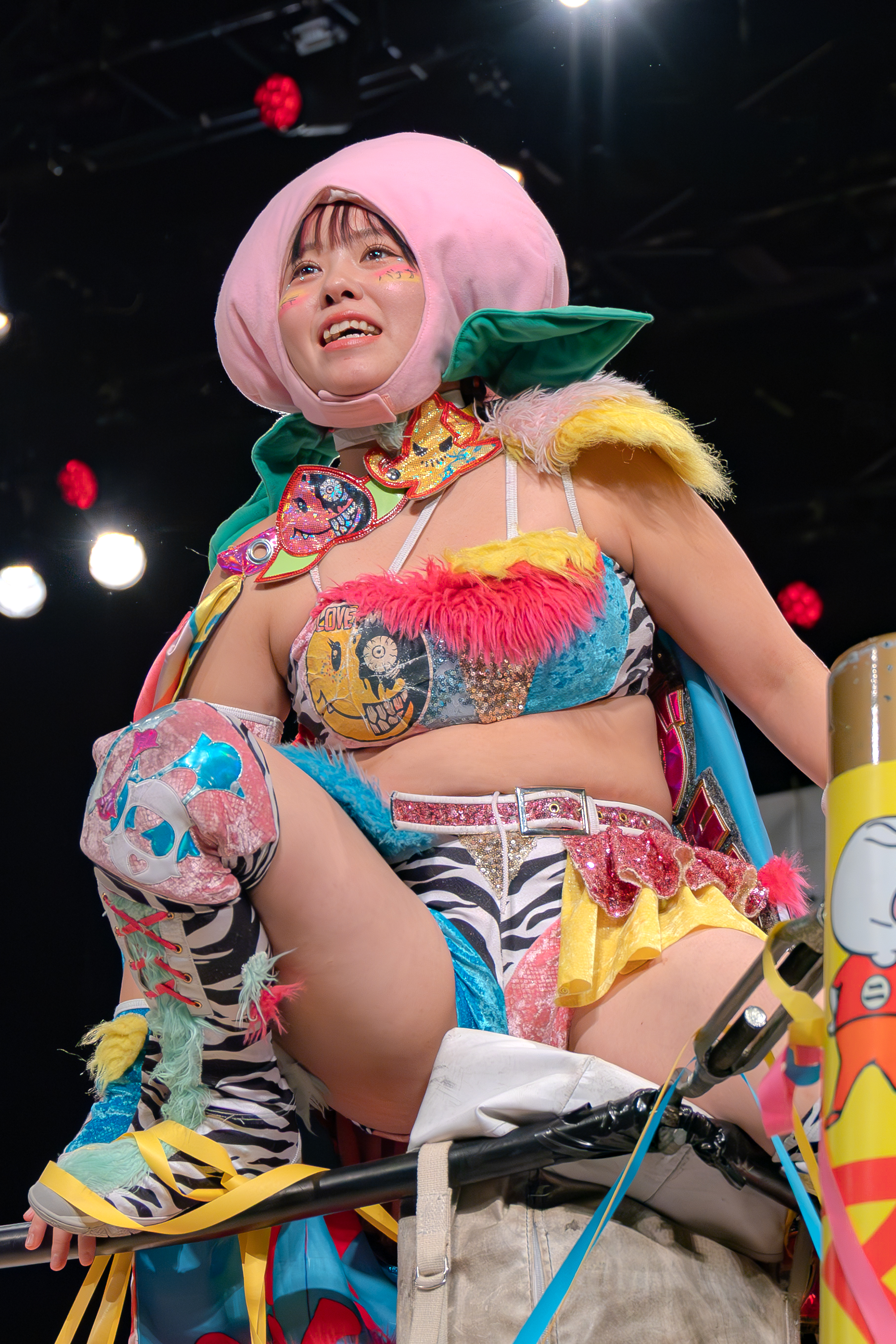
- Momono in December 2025

Personal information
- Born: May 30, 1998 (age 28) Ichihara, Chiba, Japan

Professional wrestling career
- Ring name: Mio Momono
- Billed height: 148.6 cm (4 ft 11 in)
- Billed weight: 53 kg (117 lb)
- Trained by: Chigusa Nagayo
- Debut: 2016

Mio Momono (桃野美桜, Momono Mio) is a Japanese professional wrestler currently working for Marvelous That's Women Pro Wrestling. She is best known for her time with the Japanese promotions Pro Wrestling Wave, Sendai Girls' Pro Wrestling and Ice Ribbon.

== Professional wrestling career ==
=== Independent circuit (2016-present) ===
Momono made her professional wrestling debut at MPUSA/NYWC Furinkazan III, a show promoted by New York Wrestling Connection in partnership with the US branch of Marvelous That's Women Pro Wrestling on February 13, 2016 where she teamed up with Renee Michelle in a losing effort to Davienne and Kyoko Kimura. As a freelancer, she is known for competing in various promotions. At a house show promoted by Pure-J on October 12, 2017, she teamed up with Hanako Nakamori in a losing effort to Command Bolshoi and Leon. At Hana Kimura Memorial Show from May 23, 2021, an event promoted by Kyoko Kimura to portrait one year from the passing of her daughter Hana, Momono teamed up with Asuka, Syuri and Natsupoi to defeat Oedo Tai (Kagetsu and HZK) and Tokyo Cyber Squad (Konami and Death Yama-san).

==== Ice Ribbon (2016-2018) ====
Momono wrestled for Ice Ribbon for a brief period of time. At New Ice Ribbon #838 form September 23, 2017, she teamed up with Maruko Nagasaki as "Mabutachi 2" in an International Ribbon Tag Team Championship tournament where they went into a time-limit draw against Best Friends (Arisa Nakajima and Tsukasa Fujimoto). At New Ice Ribbon #841 on October 9, she unsuccessfully challenged Fujimoto and Nakajima in a three-way match for the Triangle Ribbon Championship. She made her last appearance in the company at New Ice Ribbon #882 on May 5, 2018 where she teamed up with Kyuri and Tsukushi in a losing effort to Maika Ozaki, Saori Anou and Tae Honma.

==== Pro Wrestling Wave (2016-present) ====
Momono is known for competing in the promotion's signatures events such as the Catch the Wave tournament in which she made her first appearance at the 2018 edition, placing herself in the "Violence Block" and scoring a total of two points after competing against Ayako Hamada, Arisa Nakajima, Misaki Ohata, Hiroe Nagahama and Hikaru Shida. At the 2021 edition, she placed herself in the "Potential Block" where she met Sakura Hirota, Miyuki Takase and Tomoka Inaba and scored two points.

As for the Dual Shock Wave tournament, she made her only appearance at the 2017 edition where she teamed up with her "Boss To Mammy" stablemate Yumi Ohka to defeat Avid Rival (Misaki Ohata and Ryo Mizunami) in a first round match but fell short to New-Tra (Rin Kadokura and Takumi Iroha) in the second round.

==== Sendai Girls' Pro Wrestling (2016-present) ====
Momono made her debut in Sendai Girls' Pro Wrestling at Sendai Girls 10th Anniversary Show on October 16, 2016 where she teamed up with Mika Iwata and Ayako Hamada in a losing effort to Alex Lee, Hana Kimura and Kyoko Kimura as a result of a six-woman tag team match. At Sendai Girls Big Show 2017 from July 15, she teamed up with Rin Kadokura and Mika Shirahime in a losing effort to Aja Kong, Meiko Satomura and Nanae Takahashi.

== Championships and accomplishments ==
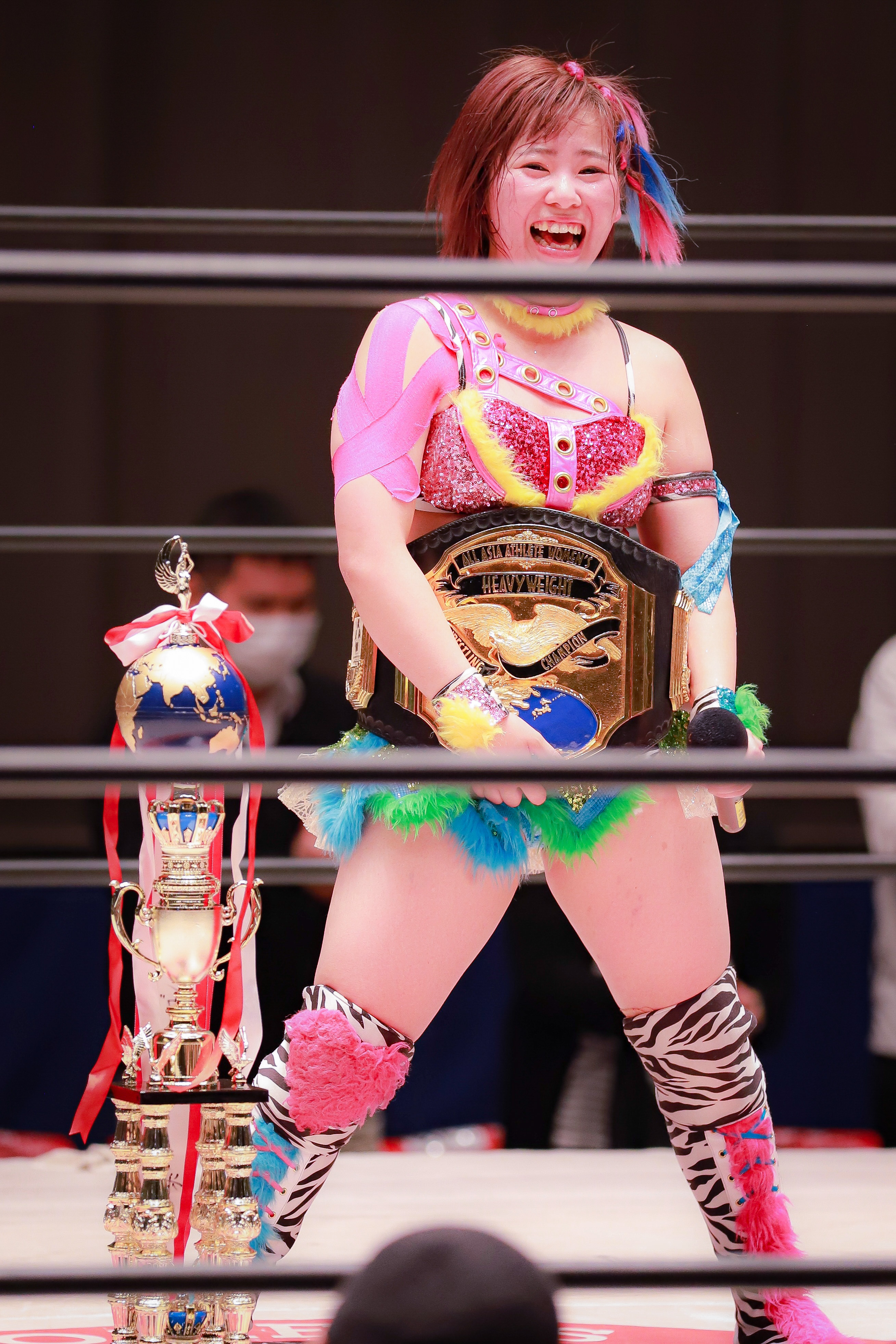
Momono is a one-time AAAW Single Champion

- Marvelous That's Women Pro Wrestling
  - AAAW Tag Team Championship (1 time) – with Yurika Oka
  - AAAW Single Championship (1 time)
- Oz Academy
  - Oz Academy Openweight Championship (1 time)
  - Best Wizard Award (1 time)
    - Best Bout Award (2023) with Chigusa Nagayo and Tomoko Watanabe vs. Kakeru, Mayumi Ozaki and Saori Anou on October 22
- Pro Wrestling Illustrated
  - Ranked No. 101 of the top 150 women's wrestlers in the PWI Women's 150 of 2021
- Pro Wrestling Wave
  - Wave Tag Team Championship (2 times) – with Yumi Ohka
  - Catch the Wave Award (2 times)
    - Fighting Spirit Award (2021)
    - Outstanding Performance Award (2021)
- Sendai Girls' Pro Wrestling
  - Sendai Girls Tag Team Championship (4 times) – with Rin Kadokura (1) and Yurika Oka (3)
- West Coast Pro Wrestling
  - West Coast Pro Women's Championship (1 time)
