= AAAW Single Championship =

Professional wrestling women's championship

- Original design of the belt (1996–present)

Details
- Promotion: Marvelous That's Women Pro Wrestling; Gaea Japan
- Date established: November 2, 1996
- Current champion: Takumi Iroha
- Date won: August 8, 2024

Other names
- AAAW Heavyweight Championship (1996–1998)
Statistics
- First champion: Chigusa Nagayo
- Most reigns: Aja Kong (3 reigns)
- Longest reign: Takumi Iroha (2nd reign, 635+ days)
- Shortest reign: Aja Kong (3rd reign, 7 days)
- Oldest champion: Mayumi Ozaki (54 years, 283 days)
- Youngest champion: Meiko Satomura (22 years, 25 days)
- Heaviest champion: Aja Kong (225 lbs)
- Lightest champion: Chikayo Nagashima (117 lbs)

The AAAW (All Asia Athlete Women's) Single Championship or AAAW Championship is a women's professional wrestling championship formerly contested in the Japanese women's professional wrestling promotion Gaea Japan until 2005 after the promotion was closed down. Originally a heavyweight championship, the weight class was dropped in 1998, making it an openweight title. On March 12, 2021 it was announced that the AAAW Singles Championship would be revived, along with the AAAW Tag Team Championship, at the GAEAISM show on April 29. It was revived in January 2022 and began being sanctioned by Marvelous That's Women Pro Wrestling ever since.

== Title history ==
On November 2, 1996, Chigusa Nagayo became the inaugural AAAW Heavyweight Champion after defeating Devil Masami. In May 1998, during Devil Masami's reign, the title was re-named as the AAAW Single Championship. The title remained active until the closing of Gaea Japan on April 10, 2005. On January 10, 2022, the title reactivated under Marvelous That's Women Pro Wrestling, where Takumi Iroha won it by defeating Chihiro Hashimoto. On November 4, Iroha vacated title after sustaining an injury.

On December 4, Nagashima won the vacant championship by defeating Mio Momono, making her the first person to hold the title both on Gaea and Marvelous.

== Reigns ==
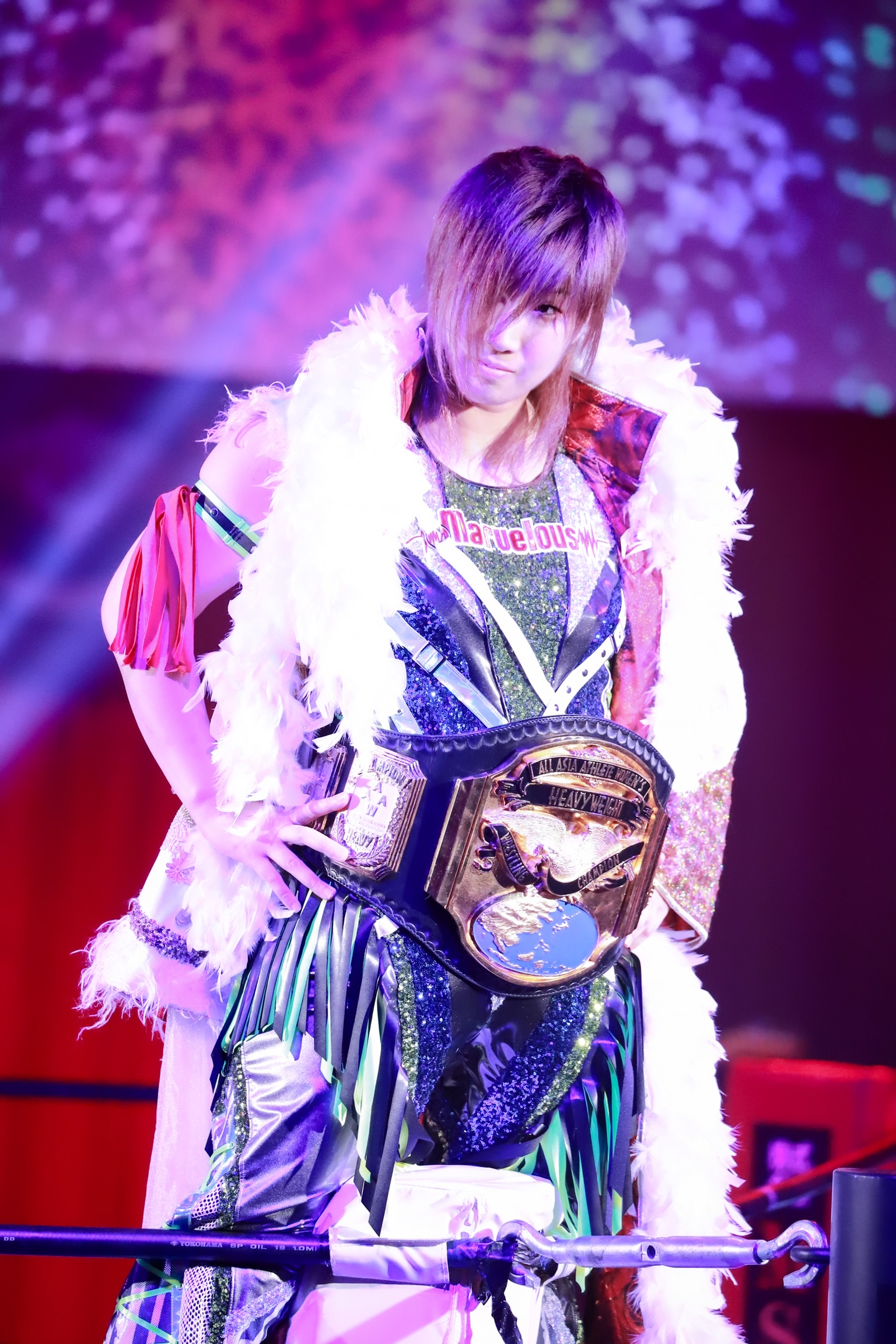
Current two-time and longest reigning champion Takumi Iroha

As of October 29, 2026, there have been 17 reigns shared between eleven different champions and one vacancy. Chigusa Nagayo was the inaugural champion. Aja Kong holds the record for most reigns at three. Kong's first reign is the longest at 607 days, while her third being the shortest at seven days. Chikayo Nagashima is the oldest champion at 46 years old, while Meiko Satomura is the youngest champion at 22 years old.

Takumi Iroha is the current champion in her second reign. She won the title by defeating Mayumi Ozaki at Marvelous 8th Anniversary on August 8, 2024, in Tokyo, Japan.

=== Names ===
Name	Years
AAAW Heavyweight Championship	November 2, 1996 – May 1998
AAAW Single Championship	May 1998 – present

Key
No.	Overall reign number
Reign	Reign number for the specific champion
Days	Number of days held

No.	Champion	Championship change			Reign statistics		Notes	Ref.
No.	Champion	Date	Event	Location	Reign	Days	Notes	Ref.
Gaea Japan
1	Chigusa Nagayo	November 2, 1996	We Are Gaea Japan!	Singapore	1	322	Nagayo defeated Devil Masami to become the inaugural champion.	
2	Devil Masami	September 20, 1997	Double Destiny	Kawasaki, Kanagawa, Japan	1	337	During Masami's reign, the title was re-named as the AAAW Single Championship.	
3	Chigusa Nagayo	August 23, 1998	Hard Luck – Day 2	Tokyo, Japan	2	268		
4	Aja Kong	May 18, 1999	Wipe Out – Day 3	Tokyo, Japan	1	607		
5	Mayumi Ozaki	January 14, 2001	Wild Times – Day 1	Tokyo, Japan	1	287		
6	Aja Kong	October 28, 2001	God Only Knows – Day 2	Nagoya, Japan	2	48		
7	Meiko Satomura	December 15, 2001	Deep Endless – Day 4	Kawasaki, Kanagawa, Japan	1	169		
8	Chikayo Nagashima	June 2, 2002	Ring On The Beat – Day 1	Tokyo, Japan	1	140		
9	Manami Toyota	October 20, 2002	Yokohama Mega Ride	Yokohama, Japan	1	406		
10	Dynamite Kansai	November 30, 2003	Iron Heart – Day 4	Tokyo, Japan	1	42		
11	Ayako Hamada	January 11, 2004	Wild Times – Day 1	Tokyo, Japan	1	110		
12	Meiko Satomura	April 30, 2004	Yoyogi Limit Break	Tokyo, Japan	2	338		
13	Aja Kong	April 3, 2005	Yokohama Final Impact	Yokohama, Japan	3	7		
—	Deactivated	April 10, 2005	Eternal Last Gong	Tokyo, Japan	—	—	The title retired at the final Gaea show.	
Marvelous That's Women Pro Wrestling
14	Takumi Iroha	January 10, 2022	Marvelous	Tokyo, Japan	1	298	Defeated Chihiro Hashimoto at Marvelous to win the reactivated title.	
—	Vacated	November 4, 2022	—	—	—	—	The championship was vacated after Iroha sustained an injury.	
15	Chikayo Nagashima	December 4, 2022	Marvelous	Tokyo, Japan	2	150	Defeated Mio Momono in the finals of a tournament to win the vacant title.	
16	Mio Momono	May 3, 2023	Marvelous 7th Anniversary	Tokyo, Japan	1	96		
17	Mayumi Ozaki	August 7, 2023	Marvelous	Tokyo, Japan	2	367		
18	Takumi Iroha	August 8, 2024	Marvelous 8th Anniversary	Tokyo, Japan	2	812+		

== Combined reigns ==
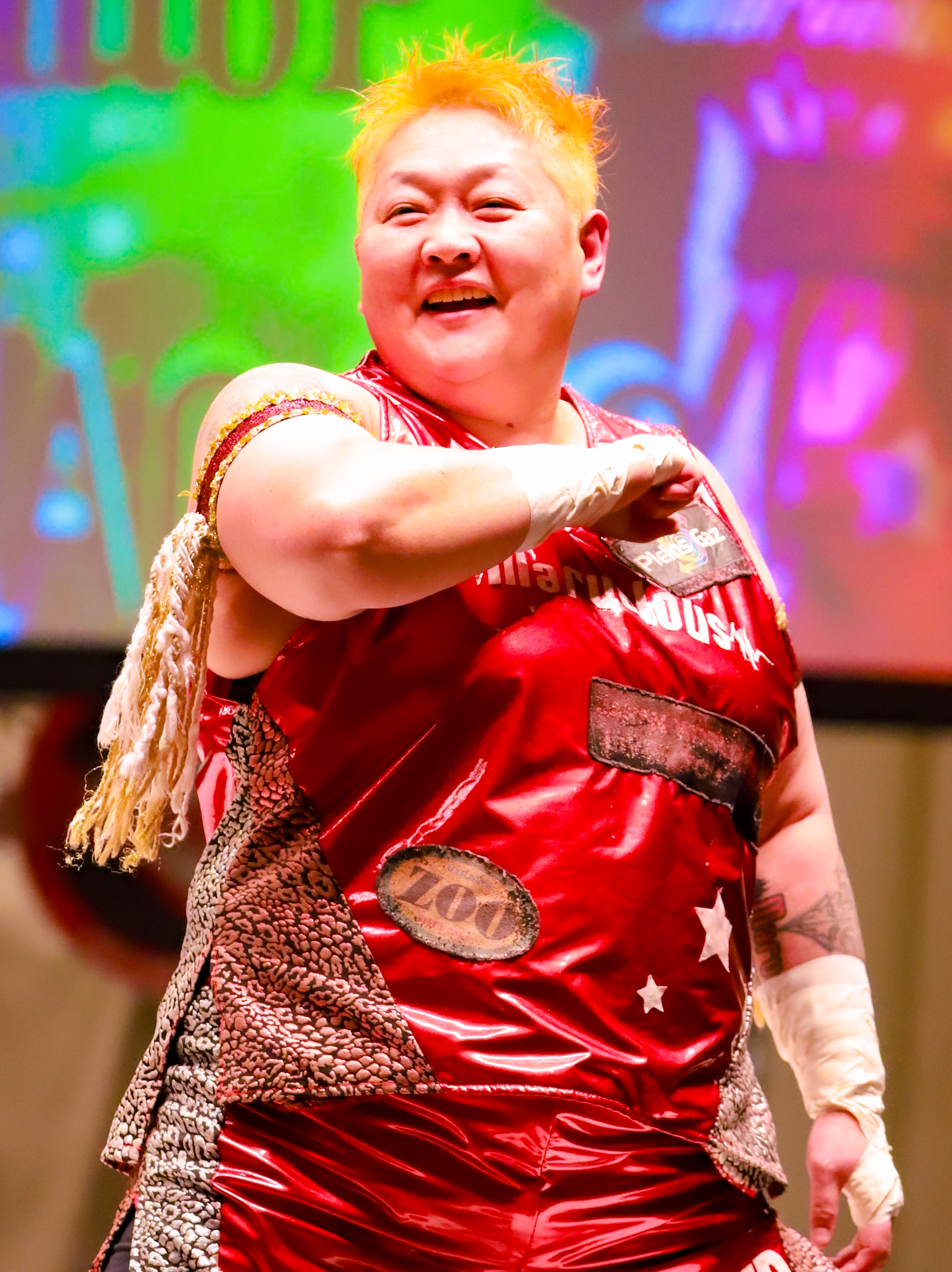
Inaugural and two-time champion Chigusa Nagayo

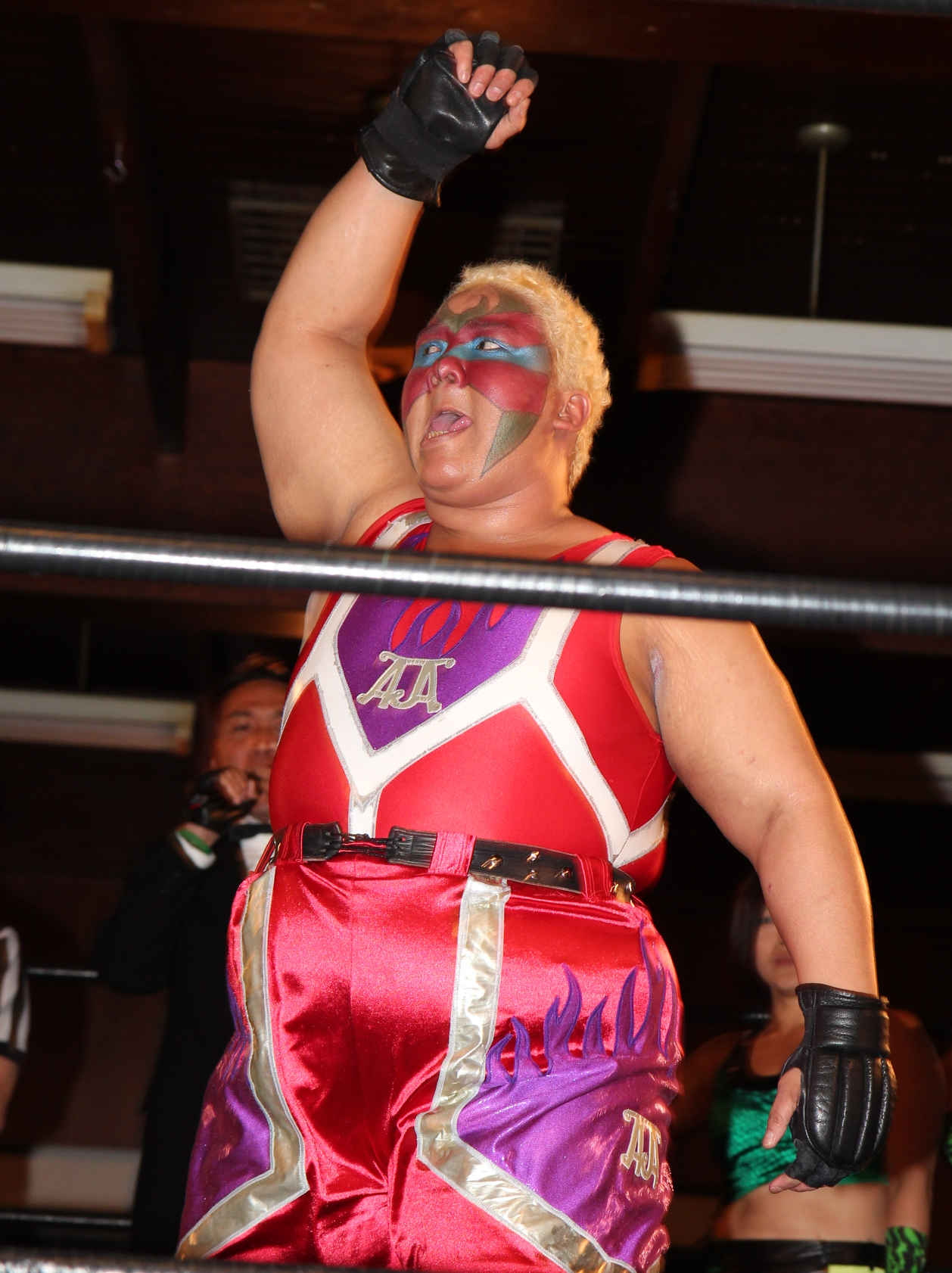
Record three-time champion Aja Kong

As of October 29, 2026.

†	Indicates the current champions

Rank	Wrestler	No. of Reigns	Combined Days
1	Takumi Iroha †	2	1,110+
2	Aja Kong	3	662
3	Mayumi Ozaki	2	654
4	Chigusa Nagayo	2	590
5	Meiko Satomura	2	507
6	Manami Toyota	1	406
7	Devil Masami	1	337
8	Chikayo Nagashima	2	290
9	Ayako Hamada	1	110
10	Mio Momono	1	96
11	Dynamite Kansai	1	42
