= WCW Women's Cruiserweight Championship =

Former professional wrestling title

- The WCW Women's Cruiserweight Championship belt

Details
- Promotion: World Championship Wrestling; GAEA Japan
- Date established: April 7, 1997
- Date retired: April 3, 1998
Statistics
- First champion: Toshie Uematsu
- Final champion: Sugar Sato
- Most reigns: All titleholders (1 reign)
- Longest reign: Sugar Sato (195 days)
- Shortest reign: Yoshiko Tamura (63 days)
- Oldest champion: Toshie Uematsu (22 years, 359 days)
- Youngest champion: Yoshiko Tamura (21 years, 164 days)
- Heaviest champion: Yoshiko Tamura (154lbs (70kg))
- Lightest champion: Toshie Uematsu (123lbs (56kg))

The World Championship Wrestling (WCW) Women's Cruiserweight Championship was a singles women's professional wrestling championship in World Championship Wrestling for smaller women. It was created as a joint venture between WCW and GAEA Japan. The weight limit for the women's cruiserweight division was 130 lb (as announced on WCW television). The first champion was crowned in a four-woman tournament that began on an episode of WCW Monday Nitro on March 31, 1997 and concluded on April 7, 1997. Since the tournament final was only shown on WCW Main Event, and the results were never mentioned on WCW television again, it is speculated that the title was created solely to be used by the GAEA promotion in Japan. In fact, the title was defended and changed hands twice in Japan before being abandoned in early 1998.

After it was retired, the rights to the WCW Women's Cruiserweight Championship, inactive since 1999, are currently owned by the World Wrestling Federation (WWF, now WWE) through its acquisition of the selected assets of WCW in 2001.

== Title history ==
On April 7, 1997, at Main Event, Toshie Uematsu became the inaugural champion by defeating Malia Hosaka in the finals of four-woman single-elimination tournament. The championship was short-lived, as it was deactivated on April 3, 1998, as GAEA Japan and WCW ended their relationship.

=== Inaugural championship tournament ===
Semifinals
1	Toshie Uematsu
4	Meiko Satomura
3	Malia Hosaka
2	Sonoko Kato

Finals
Toshie Uematsu
Malia Hosaka

== Reigns ==
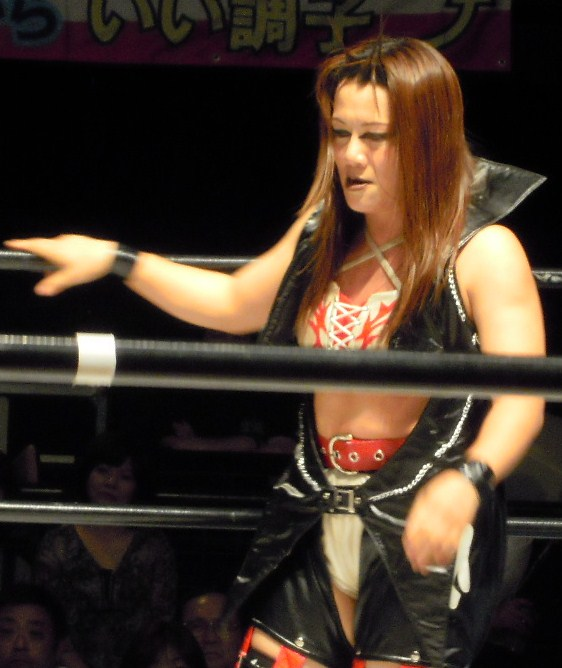
The inaugural champion Toshie Uematsu

Over the championship's 11-month history, there have only been three reigns between three champions. Toshie Uematsu was the inaugural champion. Sugar Sato's reign is the longest at 195 days, as well as being the final champion, while Yoshiko Tamura's reign is the shortest at 63 days. Uematsu is the oldest champion at 22 years old, while Tamura is the youngest at 21 years old.

Key
No.	Overall reign number
Reign	Reign number for the specific champion
Days	Number of days held

No.	Champion	Championship change			Reign statistics		Notes	Ref.
No.	Champion	Date	Event	Location	Reign	Days	Notes	Ref.
1	Toshie Uematsu	April 7, 1997	Main Event	Huntsville, AL	1	103	Defeated Malia Hosaka in the finals of a four-woman single-elimination tournament to become the inaugural champion.	
2	Yoshiko Tamura	July 19, 1997	The Dream and Future ~ 2nd Jr. All Stars	Yokohama, Japan	1	63		
3	Sugar Sato	September 20, 1997	Double Destiny	Kawasaki, Japan	1	195		
—	Deactivated	April 3, 1998	Full Bloom	Yamaguchi, Japan	—	—	The championship was deactivated due to WCW and GAEA ending their relationship.	

== See also ==
- Women's championships in WWE
- WCW Women's Championship
- WCW Cruiserweight Championship
- WCW Cruiserweight Tag Team Championship
