= Gaea Japan =

Japanese women's professional wrestling promotion

- Acronym: GAEA
- Founded: 1995
- Defunct: 2005
- Headquarters: Japan
- Founder: Chigusa Nagayo
- Owner(s): Yuka Sugiyama; Chigusa Nagayo
- Successor: Sendai Girls' Pro Wrestling; Marvelous That's Women Pro Wrestling

Gaea Japan (trademarked as GAEA Japan) was a Japanese women's professional wrestling promotion. GAEA's name comes from the Greek mythological goddess of the Earth, Gaea or Gaia.

== History ==
GAEA was founded in 1995 by Chigusa Nagayo, a professional wrestler who achieved huge success in the 1980s with her tag team partner, Lioness Asuka, as the Crush Gals.

GAEA's formation was first announced at a press conference held on August 24, 1994. Present at the event were charter members Nagayo, KAORU, and Bomber Hikaru. GAEA's first rookie auditions were also held on this occasion. Their rookie class included Meiko Satomura, Toshie Uematsu, Chikayo Nagashima, Sonoko Kato, Sugar Sato, Maiko Narita, Chihiro Nakano, and Makie Numao.

On April 15, 1995, the new promotion held its first show. It was at Tokyo's Korakuen Hall and was called Memorial First Gong. The event was a sellout and received good press. From this point on, GAEA held monthly shows at Korakuen and also occasionally went on the road to other Japanese cities.

GAEA's reputation grew as a result of the acquisition of some well-known wrestlers and the organization of some very successful interpromotional shows. GAEA acquired highly respected freelance wrestler Akira Hokuto on September 16, 1996, and Toshiyo Yamada on July 3, 1997. The promotion established a relationship with the Japanese hardcore promotion Frontier Martial Arts Wrestling (FMW) on July 29, 1995, and worked with the prominent American promotion World Championship Wrestling (WCW) in 1996. As a component of the relationship with WCW two GAEA wrestlers, Akira Hokuto and Toshie Uematsu, became the first WCW Women's Champion and WCW Women's Cruiserweight Champion respectively.

GAEA's most famous storyline involved the reunion of 80's tag team sensations, the Crush Gals, in 2000. The Crush phenomenon in Japan was roughly akin to the American phenomenon of Hulkamania and the first appearance of the reunited partnership on May 14, 2000, at GAEA's fifth-anniversary show, drew the attention of the entirety of the Japanese press.

On March 15, 2004, a weekly show with matches from GAEA started on The Wrestling Channel.

On April 10, 2005, GAEA closed its doors for good with a farewell show at the Tokyo Korakuen Hall called Eternal Last Gong. The promotion closed while still being profitable due to a combination of Nagayo's desire to retire, reliance on free agent wrestlers, and many of the original members being inactive or wanting to move on.

On February 5, 2020, Nagayo announced a one-night return for GAEA on April 15, 2020, in Korakuen Hall.

== Championships ==
GAEA established the two All Asia Athlete Women's (AAAW) titles (with AAAW being a play on the WWWA acronym of All Japan Women's Pro-Wrestling's titles), a singles championship and a tag team championship, on November 2, 1996. Originally, the singles belt was labeled "Heavyweight", while the tag team belts were labeled "Junior Heavyweight", but the weight class requirements were eliminated on May 31, 1998. The first AAAW Champion was GAEA founder Chigusa Nagayo. The belt was subsequently held by some of the most prominent Japanese women's wrestlers of the 1990s including Manami Toyota and Aja Kong. The AAAW Tag Team Championship was first held by Meiko Satomura & Sonoko Kato. Also, Uematsu's WCW Women's Cruiserweight Title was solely defended in GAEA after Uematsu won it in the United States until the title was abandoned after GAEA and WCW ceased their relationship.

The AAAW Single Championship and AAAW Tag Team Championship were revived in 2022 by Chigusa Nagayo's promotion Marvelous That's Women Pro Wrestling. The AAAW Single Championship was revived first, on January 10, 2022, with its first new champion being Takumi Iroha. The AAAW Tag Team Championship was later revived, on May 1, 2022, with Itsuki Aoki and Rin Kadokura winning a tag league tournament and obtaining the revived tag titles.

== Final champions ==
Championship	Last Champion(s)	Previous	Date Won	Location
AAAW Single Championship	Aja Kong	Meiko Satomura	April 3, 2005	Yokohama, Japan
AAAW Tag Team Championship	Ran Yu-Yu & Toshie Uematsu	Carlos Amano & Manami Toyota	April 3, 2005	Yokohama, Japan

== Alumni/notable guests ==
- Aja Kong
- Akira Hokuto
- Amazing Kong
- Ayako Hamada
- Carlos Amano
- Chigusa Nagayo
- Chihiro Nakano
- Chikayo Nagashima
- Devil Masami
- Kaoru
- Lioness Asuka
- Meiko Satomura
- Maiko Narita
- Makie Numao
- Manami Toyota
- Mayumi Ozaki
- Ran Yu-Yu
- Sonoko Kato
- Sugar Sato
- Toshie Uematsu
- Toshiyo Yamada
