= Ran Yu-Yu =

Japanese retired professional wrestler (born 1975)

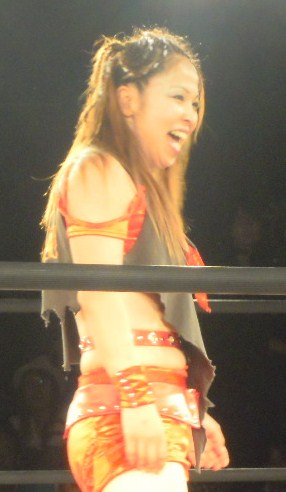
- Yu-Yu in July 2010

Personal information
- Born: Tomoko Miyaguchi; August 17, 1975 (age 50) Sennan, Osaka

Professional wrestling career
- Ring name(s): Made in Philippines; Ran Yu-Yu; Tomoko Miyaguchi
- Billed height: 1.60 m (5 ft 3 in)
- Billed weight: 62 kg (137 lb)
- Debut: December 4, 1994
- Retired: December 9, 2012

Tomoko Miyaguchi (宮口 知子, Miyaguchi Tomoko; born August 17, 1975) is a Japanese retired professional wrestler, better known by the ring name Ran Yu-Yu (輝優優, Ran Yū Yū). Best known as a tag team wrestler, Yu-Yu held the JWP Tag Team Championship a record seven times, the Daily Sports Women's Tag Team Championship three times, the AAAW Tag Team Championship and the Oz Academy Tag Team Championship twice each and the International Ribbon Tag Team Championship and Wave Tag Team Championship once each, but also excelled in singles competition, most notably winning the JWP and Oz Academy Openweight Championships. She finished her 18-year career on December 9, 2012.

== Professional wrestling career ==
Miyaguchi started her professional wrestling career in 1994, working under her real name in JWP Joshi Puroresu. She made her debut on December 4, 1994, in a match against Rieko Amano. Originally working as a "junior" wrestler in not only JWP, but also All Japan Women's Pro-Wrestling (AJW) and Gaea Japan, Miyaguchi went on to win the Junior Championships in both JWP and AJW. After the end of her junior days, Miyaguchi adopted the new ring name Ran Yu-Yu, which she held for the rest of her career. Under her new ring name, Yu-Yu went on to win the JWP Openweight Championship in 1999. She remained affiliated with JWP until October 2002, when she officially joined Gaea Japan full-time.

In Gaea Japan, Yu-Yu formed the highly successful Uematsu☆Ran tag team with Toshie Uematsu. The two remained together for ten years, winning Gaea Japan's AAAW Tag Team Championship twice, JWP's Daily Sports Women's Tag Team Championship twice, the JWP Tag Team Championship four times, and the Wave Tag Team Championship once, while also winning JWP's Tag League the Best tournament in 2012. On April 30, 2012, Yu-Yu and Uematsu defeated Moeka Haruhi and Shuu Shibutani in Uematsu's retirement match.

Following the folding of Gaea Japan in 2005, Yu-Yu began working as a freelancer though effectively making Oz Academy her new home promotion. In Oz Academy, Yu-Yu became a two-time Tag Team Champion with Akino, with the two representing Aja Kong's Jungle Jack 21 stable. On April 29, 2011, Yu-Yu defeated Kong to win the Oz Academy Openweight Championship. After a three-month reign, she lost the title to Dynamite Kansai. Shortly after her longtime tag team partner Toshie Uematsu had announced her retirement, Yu-Yu followed suit and announced that she would retire before the end of 2012. On November 11, Oz Academy founder Mayumi Ozaki was announced as Yu-Yu's opponent for her retirement match on December 9. Having quit Jungle Jack 21 and joined the villainous Seikigun stable on September 23, 2011, in order to get another shot at the Oz Academy Openweight Championship, Yu-Yu reunited with her old stablemates for her final self-produced event, titled Starlight's Regret, on December 2, 2012, which saw Yu-Yu, Aja Kong, Akino, Hiroyo Matsumoto and Tomoka Nakagawa defeat Carlos Amano, Chikayo Nagashima, Meiko Satomura, Sonoko Kato and Tsubasa Kuragaki in a ten-woman tag team match that lasted over an hour. On December 6, Yu-Yu wrestled her final matches for her original home promotion, JWP. First she wrestled Arisa Nakajima to a fifteen-minute time limit draw and then won a twelve-woman main event battle royal, where all participants were dressed as her, scoring the last elimination over Kazuki. On December 9, Yu-Yu was defeated by Ozaki in her advertised retirement match, following interference from Ozaki's Seikigun stable. However, immediately afterwards, Yu-Yu teamed with Carlos Amano to defeat Ozaki and Dynamite Kansai, pinning Ozaki for the win in the final match of her career.

== Championships and accomplishments ==
- All Japan Women's Pro-Wrestling
  - AJW Junior Championship (1 time)
- Gaea Japan
  - AAAW Tag Team Championship (2 times) – with Toshie Uematsu
- Ice Ribbon
  - International Ribbon Tag Team Championship (1 time) – with Azumi Hyuga
- JWP Joshi Puroresu
  - Daily Sports Women's Tag Team Championship (3 times) – with Azumi Hyuga (1) and Toshie Uematsu (2)
  - JWP Junior Championship (1 time)
  - JWP Openweight Championship (1 time)
  - JWP Tag Team Championship (7 times) – with Azumi Hyuga (2), Misae Genki (1) and Toshie Uematsu (4)
  - JWP Tag League the Best (2012) – with Toshie Uematsu
  - JWP Year End-Award (2 times)
    - Best Bout Award (2002) vs. Azumi Hyuga on May 19
    - Special Award (2001)
- M's Style
  - One Day Tag Tournament (2005) – with Toshie Uematsu
- Nikkan Sports
  - Joshi Tag Team Award (2006, 2008) – with Toshie Uematsu
- Oz Academy
  - Oz Academy Openweight Championship (1 time)
  - Oz Academy Tag Team Championship (2 times) – with Akino
  - Best Wizard Award (2 times)
    - Best Singles Match Award (2012) vs. Aja Kong on October 14
    - Best Tag Team Match Award (2010) with Akino vs. Chikayo Nagashima and Sonoko Kato on August 22
- Pro Wrestling Wave
  - Wave Tag Team Championship (1 time) – with Toshie Uematsu
