= Chikayo Nagashima =

Japanese professional wrestler (born 1976)

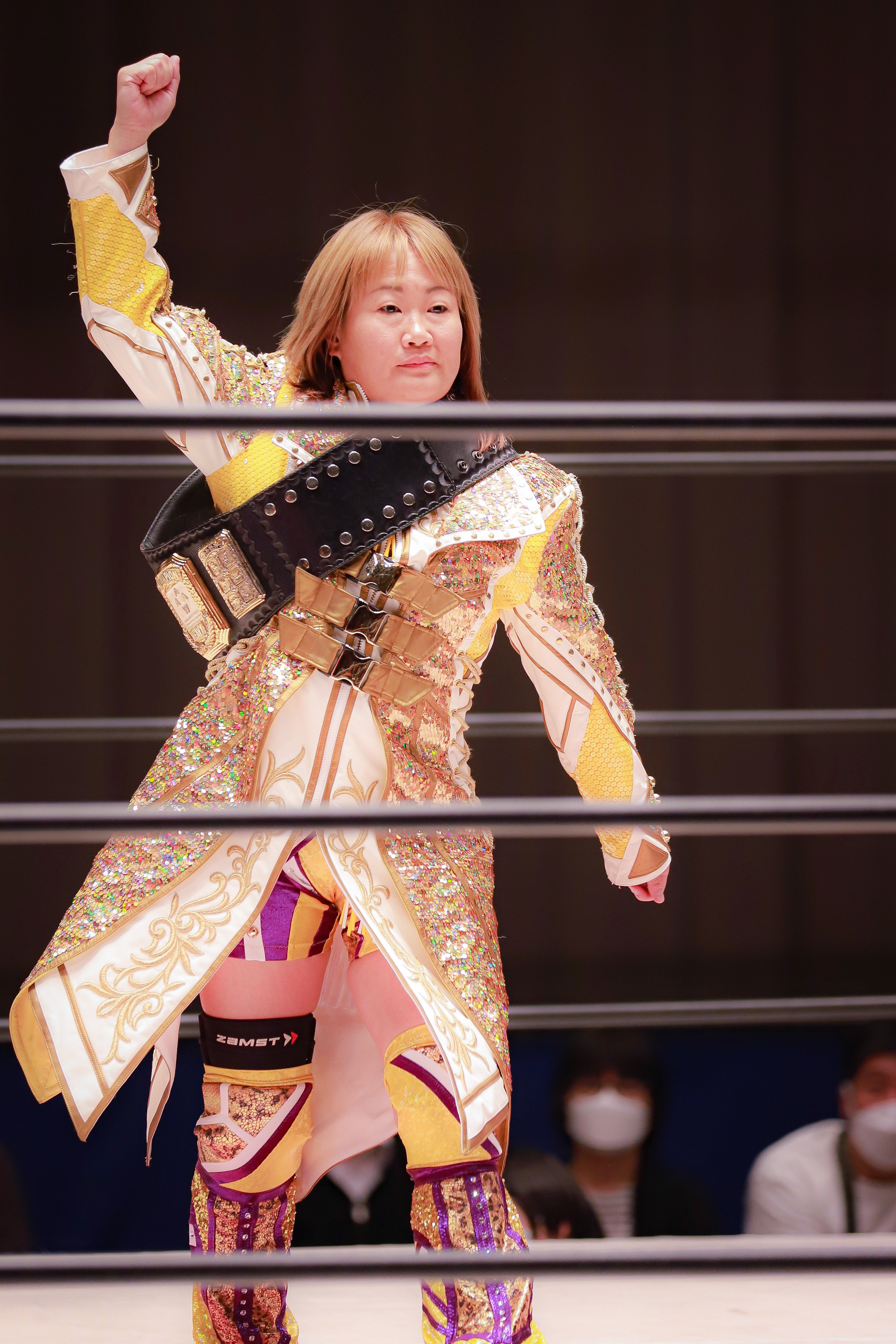
- Nagashima in May 2023

Personal information
- Born: Chikayo Nagashima; January 24, 1976 (age 50) Matsudo, Chiba

Professional wrestling career
- Ring name(s): Blanca X Chikayo Nagashima
- Billed height: 1.58 m (5 ft 2 in)
- Billed weight: 52 kg (115 lb)
- Trained by: Chigusa Nagayo
- Debut: April 15, 1995

Chikayo Nagashima (永島 千佳世, Nagashima Chikayo; born January 24, 1976) is a Japanese professional wrestler. She started her career in 1995, working for the Gaea Japan promotion, where she became a one-time AAAW Single Champion and a record five-time AAAW Tag Team Champion. She was also notably one of the four founding members of the Oz Academy stable. Following the folding of Gaea Japan in 2005, Nagashima affiliated herself with Oz Academy, now a full-time promotion, where she has become a three-time Oz Academy Tag Team Champion and a one-time Oz Academy Openweight Champion, holding the record for the longest reign in the title's history. Nagashima remained with Oz Academy until August 2015, after which she became a freelancer.

== Early life ==
Nagashima grew up a fan of professional wrestling and began practising judo in junior high school and amateur wrestling in high school, finishing third at the 47 kg (104 lb) class of the All Japan Women's Open Championship games.

== Professional wrestling career ==
=== Gaea Japan (1995–2005) ===
Instead of continuing her amateur wrestling career in a university, Nagashima took part in an audition held by professional wrestling promotion, Gaea Japan, which she passed with flying colors. Nagashima eventually made her in-ring debut at Gaea Japan's inaugural event on April 15, 1995, wrestling Toshie Uematsu to a twenty-one-minute draw. On April 29, 1996, Nagashima defeated Sonoko Kato in the finals of a tournament contested between Gaea Japan's rookies. On July 31, Nagashima turned on the Gaea Japan Seikigun ("regular army") and joined forces with Mayumi Ozaki, Carlos Amano and Sugar Sato, forming a stable, which later became known as Oz Academy. As a result, Nagashima began working as a villainous character for the first time in her career. Nagashima also made guest appearances for the All Japan Women's Pro-Wrestling promotion, where she and Sato won the AJW Tag Team Championship, Nagashima's first title in professional wrestling, on September 1, 1996. From 1998 to 2001, Nagashima and Sato also won Gaea Japan's tag team championship, the AAAW Tag Team Championship, three times. In May 2000, Nagashima and Sato ended their longtime partnership with Mayumi Ozaki by quitting her Himiko stable, the most recent incarnation of Oz Academy, and returning to Gaea Japan Seikigun. On June 2, 2002, Nagashima first won a tournament during an afternoon show to become the number one contender to Gaea Japan's top title, the AAAW Single Championship, and later that same day, during an evening show, defeated Meiko Satomura to become the new champion, while also becoming the lightest champion in the title's history. She lost the title to Manami Toyota on October 20. During the next two years, Nagashima went on to win the AAAW Tag Team Championship two more times, once with Meiko Satomura and once with old partner Sugar Sato. Nagashima's five tag team title reigns are a Gaea Japan record. On April 10, 2005, Gaea Japan held its final event before going out of business, during which Nagashima and Sato defeated Ran Yu-Yu and Toshie Uematsu, the final AAAW Tag Team Champions, in a non-title match.

=== Oz Academy (2005–2015) ===
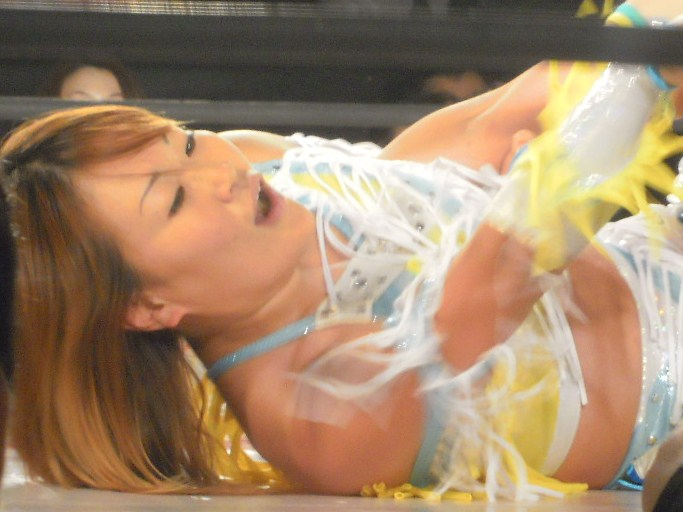
Nagashima in July 2010

Following the folding of Gaea Japan, Nagashima affiliated herself with Mayumi Ozaki's Oz Academy promotion, which she now had turned into a full promotion. During 2005, Nagashima also made several appearances for the Hustle promotion, working under a mask as "Blanca X". In early 2006, Nagashima, along with several other Oz Academy workers, made her first trip to Mexico, taking part in events held by AAA. Back in Oz Academy, as representatives of the Oz Seikigun, Nagashima and fellow Gaea Japan alum Sonoko Kato became three-time Oz Academy Tag Team Champions. In early 2008, Nagashima returned to Mexico's AAA, taking part in the Reina de Reinas Universal Tournament, from which she was eliminated by Mari Apache. On September 23, 2011, Nagashima turned on the Oz Seikigun (正規軍) and joined the villainous Seikigun (正危軍), another incarnation of the original Oz Academy stable, after the stable's leader Mayumi Ozaki had announced that she was only going to be defending the Oz Academy Openweight Championship against her stablemates. On February 26, 2012, Nagashima defeated Seikigun stablemates Hiroyo Matsumoto, Ran Yu-Yu and Yumi Ohka to become the number one contender to the Oz Academy Openweight Championship. On March 25, Nagashima defeated Ozaki in a Dress Up Wild Fight 30 minute Time of the Trial match to become the new Oz Academy Openweight Championship. Initially a reluctant member of Seikigun, Nagashima embraced her "dark side" only after cheating to successfully defend the Oz Academy Openweight Championship against Hiroyo Matsumoto on August 19. Nagashima made her second successful title defense on January 13, 2013, against Seikigun's newest member, Mio Shirai. On April 24, Nagashima lost the Oz Academy Openweight Championship to Akino in her third defense, ending her reign at 395 days, the longest in the title's history. Afterwards, Nagashima came to odds with her Seikigun stablemates, which led to a Hair vs. Hair match on September 15, where Maymi Ozaki, waging both her own and the stable's manager Mika Nishio's hairs, defeated Nagashima, forcing her to have her head shaved. Nagashima finally turned on Ozaki and the Seikigun on January 12, 2014. On February 9, Nagashima suffered a cruciate ligament rupture in her left knee, forcing her to undergo surgery on February 18.

After a full year of being sidelined, Nagashima returned to the ring on March 1, 2015, in a match, where she was defeated by Hikaru Shida. On July 19, Nagashima announced she was leaving Oz Academy and becoming a freelancer following August 23. In her final match under an Oz Academy contract, Nagashima defeated Ayako Hamada.

=== Freelancing (2015–present) ===
Nagashima's first major match since becoming a freelancer took place on September 23, 2015, when she unsuccessfully challenged Ayako Hamada for Pro Wrestling Wave's Single Championship. On September 19, 2016, Nagashima and Megumi Yabushita, representing the Crysis stable, defeated Keiko Aono and Kyoko Inoue to win World Woman Pro-Wrestling Diana's vacant World Tag Team Championship.

== Championships and accomplishments ==
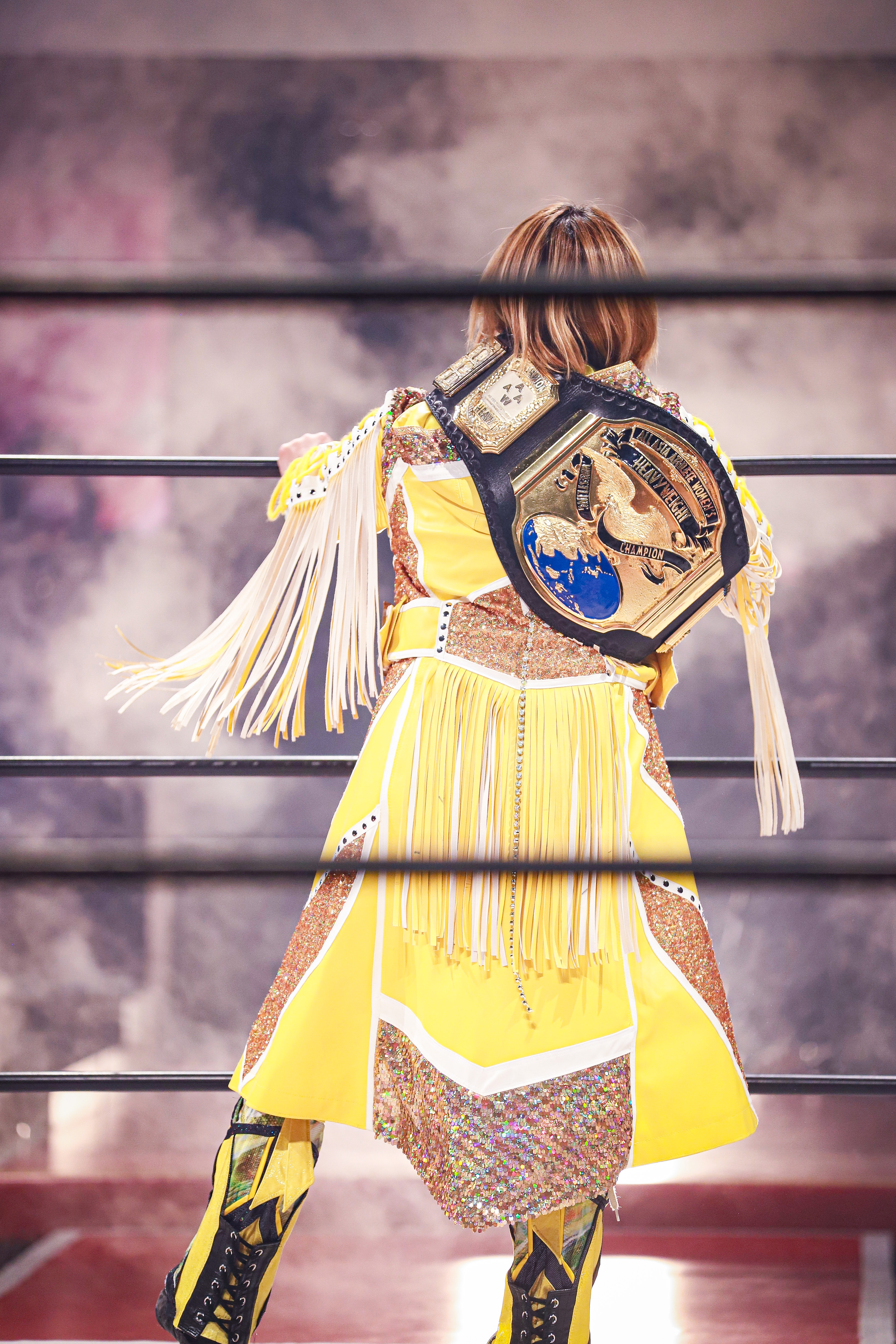
In Marvelous, Nagashima is a former AAAW Singles Champion

- All Japan Women's Pro-Wrestling
  - AJW Tag Team Championship (1 time) – with Sugar Sato
- Gaea Japan
  - AAAW Single Championship (2 times) (Note: Nagashima's first reign with the AAAW Single Championship was under the Gaea banner. Her second reign was at Marvelous.)
  - AAAW Junior Heavyweight Tag Team Championship / AAAW Tag Team Championship (6 times) – with Sugar Sato (4), (Note: During Nagashima's first reign with Sugar Sato, the title's name was changed from AAAW Junior Heavyweight Tag Team Championship to AAAW Tag Team Championship.) Meiko Satomura (1) and Takumi Iroha (1) (Note: Nagashima's first five reigns with the title was under the Gaea banner. Her sixth reign, where she won the title with Takumi Iroha, was at Marvelous.)
  - AAAW Single Championship Next Challenger Tournament (2002)
  - Rookie League (1996)
  - Tag Team Tournament (1996) – with Sugar Sato
- Marvelous That's Women Pro Wrestling
  - AAAW Single Championship (2 times)
  - AAAW Tag Team Championship (6 times) – with Takumi Iroha
- Oz Academy
  - Oz Academy Openweight Championship (1 time)
  - Oz Academy Tag Team Championship (3 times) – with Sonoko Kato
  - Iron Woman Tag Tournament (2004) – with Amazing Kong
  - Best Wizard Award (3 times)
    - Best Bout Award (2013) vs. Mayumi Ozaki on September 15
    - Best Tag Team Match Award (2010) with Sonoko Kato vs. Akino and Ran Yu-Yu on August 22
    - Best Tag Team Match Award (2011) with Sonoko Kato vs. Hiroyo Matsumoto and Tomoka Nakagawa on January 9
- Pro Wrestling Illustrated
  - Ranked No. 177 of the top 250 female singles wrestlers in the PWI Women's 250 in 2023
- Pro Wrestling Wave
  - Catch the Wave Award (1 time)
    - Best Performance Award (2015) as part of the Wonderful World Fairy Family
- World Woman Pro-Wrestling Diana
  - WWWD Queen Elizabeth Championship (1 time)
  - WWWD World Tag Team Championship (1 time) – with Megumi Yabushita

== Luchas de Apuestas record ==
Winner (wager)	Loser (wager)	Location	Event	Date	Notes
Mayumi Ozaki (hair)	Chikayo Nagashima (hair)	Yokohama, Kanagawa, Japan	Yokohama Dreams Park 2	September 15, 2013	(Note: Ozaki waged both her own and Mika Nishio's hairs.)
