= AAAW Tag Team Championship =

Women's professional wrestling championship

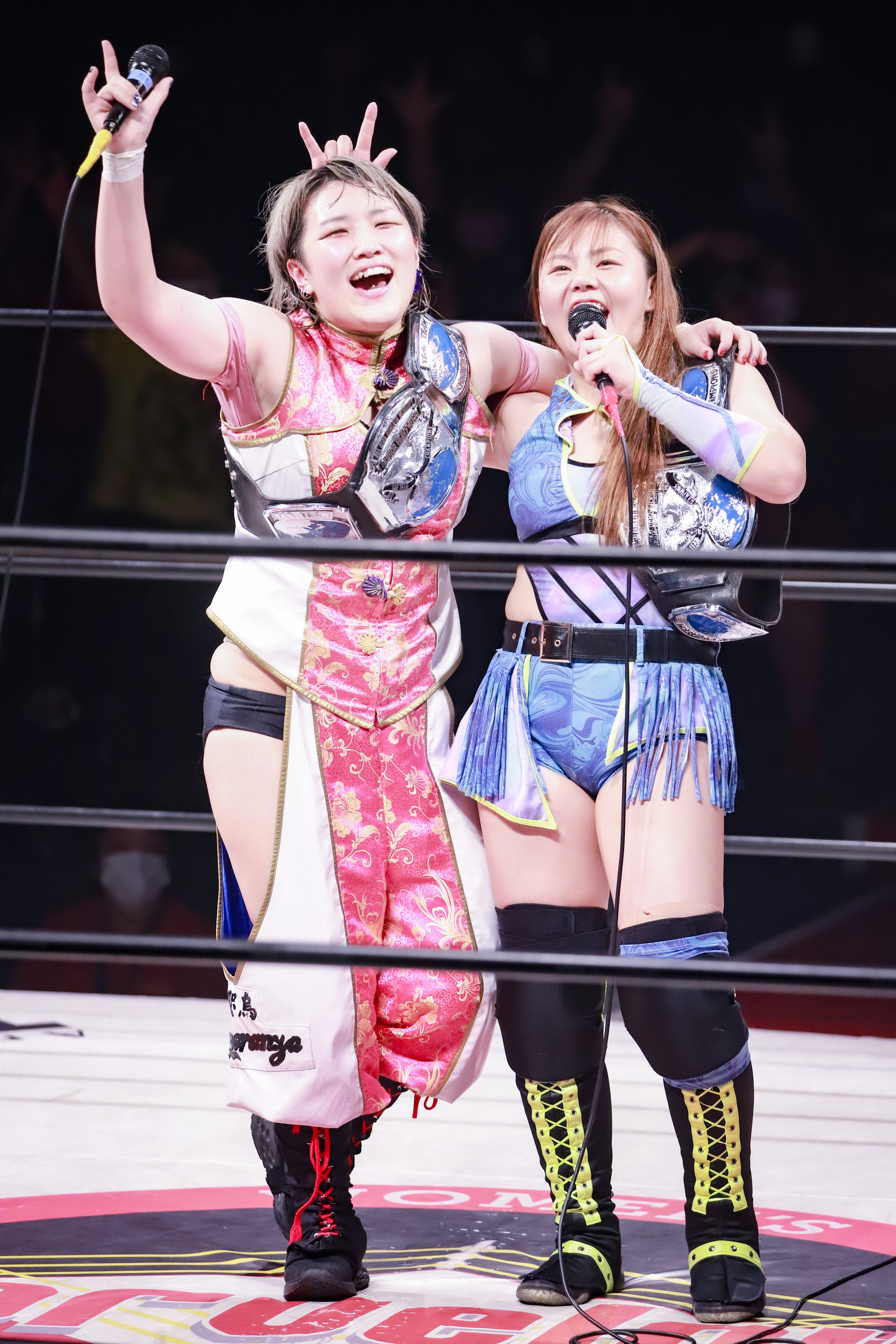
- Itsuki Aoki (left) and Rin Kadokura (right) with the belts in 2022

Details
- Promotion: Marvelous That's Women Pro Wrestling; Gaea Japan
- Date established: November 2, 1996
- Current champions: Nightshade and Nyla Rose
- Date won: May 5, 2026

Other names
- AAAW Junior Heavyweight Tag Team Championship (1996–1998)
Statistics
- First champions: Meiko Satomura and Sonoko Kato
- Most reigns: As a team (4 reigns): Chikayo Nagashima and Sugar Sato; As an individual (6 reigns): Chikayo Nagashima
- Longest reign: Chikayo Nagashima and Sugar Sato (2nd reign, 518 days)
- Shortest reign: The Crush Gals (Chigusa Nagayo and Lioness Asuka) (5 days)
- Oldest champion: Sonoko Kato (48 years, 243 days)

The AAAW Tag Team Championship is a women's professional wrestling championship formerly contested in the Japanese women's professional wrestling promotion Gaea Japan. The title which was originally known as the AAAW Junior Heavyweight Tag Team Championship before weight classes were dropped in 1998, was abandoned when GAEA closed in 2005. It was revived in May 2022 and began being sanctioned by Marvelous That's Women Pro Wrestling ever since.

== Title history ==
On November 2, 1996, Meiko Satomura and Sonoko Kato defeated Chikayo Nagashima and Sugar Sato to become the inaugural champions. On March 29, 1998, during Nagashima and Sato's reign, the title was renamed from AAAW Junior Heavyweight Tag Team Championship to AAAW Tag Team Championship. The title remained active until the closing of Gaea Japan on April 10, 2005.

=== Reactivation tag league (2022) ===
On May 1, 2022, the title reactivated under Marvelous That's Women Pro Wrestling, where Itsuki Aoki and Rin Kadokura won it by defeating Kaoru Ito and Tomoko Watanabe in a tag league finals, tournamrent which began on February 24, 2022.

Final standings
Block A		Block B	
Kaoru Ito and Tomoko Watanabe	4	Itsuki Aoki and Rin Kadokura	4
Hibiscus Mii and Takumi Iroha	3	Las Fresa de Egoistas (Makoto and Maria)	3
Ancham and Chikayo Nagashima	3	Riko Kawahata and Yuki Miyazaki	3
Nippon Ganbare Union (Yuna Manase and Yuuri)	2	Ai Houzan and Yurika Oka	2

Block A	Ito Watanabe	Mii Iroha	Ancham Nagashima	Manase Yuuri
Ito Watanabe	—N/a	Ito; Watanabe (14:13)	Ancham; Nagashima (12:52)	Ito; Watanabe (14:13)
Mii Iroha	Ito; Watanabe (14:13)	—N/a	Mii; Iroha	Draw (20:00)
Ancham Nagashima	Ancham; Nagashima (12:52)	Mii; Iroha	—N/a	Double Count Out (15:25)
Manase Yuuri	Ito; Watanabe (14:13)	Draw (20:00)	Double Count Out (15:25)	—N/a
Block B	Aoki Kadokura	Makoto Maria	Kawahata Miyazaki	Houzan Oka
Aoki Kadokura	—N/a	Aoki; Kadokura (16:36)	Kawahata; Miyazaki (12:40)	Aoki; Kadokura (15:51)
Makoto Maria	Aoki; Kadokura (16:36)	—N/a	Makoto; Maria (14:31)	Draw (20:00)
Kawahata Miyazaki	Kawahata; Miyazaki (12:40)	Makoto; Maria (14:31)	—N/a	Draw (20:00)
Houzan Oka	Aoki; Kadokura (15:51)	Draw (20:00)	Draw (20:00)	—N/a

Final; May 1, 2022
A1	Kaoru Ito and Tomoko Watanabe	Pin
B1	Itsuki Aoki and Rin Kadokura	17:48

== Reigns ==
As of November 3, 2026, there have been a total of 25 reigns shared between 20 teams composed of 30 individual champions. Meiko Satomura and Sonoko Kato were the inaugural champions. As a team, Chikayo Nagashima and Sugar Sato has the most reigns at four, while individually, Nagashima has the most reigns at six. Nagashima and Sato's second reign is the longest at 518 days, while The Crush Gals (Chigusa Nagayo and Lioness Asuka)'s reign is the shortest at five days. Nagashima is the oldest champion at 46 years old.

Nightshade and Nyla Rose are the current champions in their first reign as a team and individually. They won it by defeating Maria and Riko on May 5, 2026, in Tokyo, Japan.

=== Names ===
Name	Years
AAAW Junior Heavyweight Tag Team Championship	November 2, 1996 – May 1998
AAAW Tag Team Championship	May 1998 – April 10, 2005; May 1, 2022 – present

Key
No.	Overall reign number
Reign	Reign number for the specific team—reign numbers for the individuals are in parentheses, if different
Days	Number of days held
Defenses	Number of successful defenses
+	Current reign is changing daily

No.	Champion	Championship change			Reign statistics			Notes	Ref.
No.	Champion	Date	Event	Location	Reign	Days	Defenses	Notes	Ref.
Gaea Japan
1	Meiko Satomura and Sonoko Kato	November 2, 1996	We Are Gaea Japan!	Singapore	1	512	3	Defeated Chikayo Nagashima and Sugar Sato to become the inaugural champions.	
2	Chikayo Nagashima and Sugar Sato	March 29, 1998	Full Bloom – Day 2	Osaka, Japan	1	147	0	During the reign, the name of the title was changed from "AAAW Junior Heavyweight Tag Team Championship" to "AAAW Tag Team Championship".	
3	Aja Kong and Mayumi Ozaki	August 23, 1998	Hard Luck – Day 2	Tokyo, Japan	1	329	1		
4	Oz Academy (Chikayo Nagashima and Sugar Sato)	July 18, 1999	Surprise Attack – Day 3	Tokyo, Japan	2	518	3		
5	Akira Hokuto and Mayumi Ozaki	December 17, 2000	Deep Endless – Day 5	Osaka, Japan	1 (1, 2)	126	1		
6	Oz Academy (Chikayo Nagashima and Sugar Sato)	April 22, 2001	Limit Break – Day 4	Osaka, Japan	3	350	0		
7	Kaoru and Mayumi Ozaki	April 7, 2002	Limit Break – Day 1	Yokohama, Japan	1 (1, 3)	196	1		
8	Ayako Hamada and Meiko Satomura	October 20, 2002	Yokohama Mega Ride	Yokohama, Japan	1 (1, 2)	114	1		
9	Aja Kong and Devil Masami	February 11, 2003	War Cry – Day 2	Tokyo, Japan	1 (2, 1)	224	0		
10	Chikayo Nagashima and Meiko Satomura	September 23, 2003	New Energy – Day 2	Tokyo, Japan	1 (4, 3)	147	3		
11	Ran Yu-Yu and Toshie Uematsu	February 17, 2004	War Cry – Day 2	Tokyo, Japan	1	33	0		
12	Oz Academy (Chikayo Nagashima and Sugar Sato)	March 21, 2004	Edge Of The Heart – Day 2	Tokyo, Japan	4	40	0		
13	The Crush Gals (Chigusa Nagayo and Lioness Asuka)	April 30, 2004	Yoyogi Limit Break	Tokyo, Japan	1	5	2		
14	Aja Kong and Amazing Kong	May 5, 2004	Junction – Day 2	Tokyo, Japan	1 (3, 1)	138	0		
15	Carlos Amano and Manami Toyota	September 20, 2004	New Energy – Day 2	Tokyo, Japan	1	195	0		
16	Ran Yu-Yu and Toshie Uematsu	April 3, 2005	Yokohama Final Impact	Yokohama, Japan	2	7	0		
—	Deactivated	April 10, 2005	Eternal Last Gong	Tokyo, Japan	—	—	—	The titles were retired at the final Gaea show.	
Marvelous That's Women Pro Wrestling
17	Itsuki Aoki and Rin Kadokura	May 1, 2022	Marvelous 6th Anniversary	Tokyo, Japan	1	138	0	Defeated Kaoru Ito and Tomoko Watanabe in the finals of a tag league to win the revived titles.	
18	Chikayo Nagashima and Takumi Iroha	September 16, 2022	Marvelous	Tokyo, Japan	1 (6, 1)	450	1		
19	Magenta (Maria and Riko Kawahata)	December 10, 2023	Marvelous	Tokyo, Japan	1	242	2		
20	Team 200kg (Chihiro Hashimoto and Yuu)	August 8, 2024	Marvelous	Tokyo, Japan	1	80	1		
21	Bob Bob Momo Banana (Mio Momono and Yurika Oka)	October 27, 2024	Marvelous	Nagoya, Japan	1	105	1		
22	H2D (Ryo Mizunami and Sonoko Kato)	February 9, 2025	Oz Academy Angels Of The Abyss	Tokyo, Japan	1 (1, 2)	100	1		
23	Spark Rush (Sareee and Takumi Iroha)	May 20, 2025	Marvelous	Tokyo, Japan	1 (1, 2)	222	3		
24	Magenta (Maria and Riko)	December 28, 2025	Marvelous	Tokyo, Japan	2	128	0	Riko was previously known under her full ring name of Riko Kawahata.	
25	Nightshade and Nyla Rose	May 5, 2026	Marvelous 10th Anniversary Commemorative Event	Tokyo, Japan	1	182+	1		

== Combined reigns ==
As of November 3, 2026.

†	Indicates the current champions

=== By team ===
Rank	Team	No. of reigns	Combined defenses	Combined days
1	Oz Academy (Note: Nagashima and Sato named their tag team "Oz Academy" in their second reign.) (Chikayo Nagashima and Sugar Sato)	4	3	1,055
2	Meiko Satomura and Sonoko Kato	1	3	512
3	Chikayo Nagashima and Takumi Iroha	1	1	450
4	Magenta (Maria and Riko/Kawahata)	2	2	370
5	Aja Kong and Mayumi Ozaki	1	1	329
6	Aja Kong and Devil Masami	1	0	224
7	Spark Rush (Sareee and Takumi Iroha)	1	3	222
8	Kaoru and Mayumi Ozaki	1	1	196
9	Carlos Amano and Manami Toyota	1	0	195
10	Nightshade and Nyla Rose †	1	1	182+
11	Chikayo Nagashima and Meiko Satomura	1	0	147
12	Aja Kong and Amazing Kong	1	0	138
12	Itsuki Aoki and Rin Kadokura	1	0	138
14	Akira Hokuto and Mayumi Ozaki	1	1	126
15	Ayako Hamada and Meiko Satomura	1	1	114
16	Bob Bob Momo Banana (Mio Momono and Yurika Oka)	1	1	105
17	H2D (Ryo Mizunami and Sonoko Kato)	1	1	100
18	Team 200kg (Chihiro Hashimoto and Yuu)	1	1	80
19	Ran Yu-Yu and Toshie Uematsu	2	0	40
20	The Crush Gals (Chigusa Nagayo and Lioness Asuka)	1	2	5

=== By wrestler ===
Rank	wrestler	No. of reigns	Combined defenses	Combined days
1	Chikayo Nagashima	6	4	1,652
2	Sugar Sato	4	3	1,055
3	Meiko Satomura	3	4	773
4	Aja Kong	3	1	691
5	Takumi Iroha	2	4	672
6	Mayumi Ozaki	3	3	651
7	Sonoko Kato	2	4	612
8	Maria	2	2	370
8	Riko/Kawahata	2	2	370
10	Devil Masami	1	0	224
11	Sareee	1	3	222
12	Kaoru	1	1	196
13	Carlos Amano	1	0	195
13	Manami Toyota	1	0	195
15	Nightshade †	1	1	182+
15	Nyla Rose †	1	1	182+
17	Amazing Kong	1	0	138
17	Itsuki Aoki	1	0	138
17	Rin Kadokura	1	0	138
20	Akira Hokuto	1	1	126
21	Ayako Hamada	1	1	114
22	Mio Momono	1	1	105
22	Yurika Oka	1	1	105
24	Ryo Mizunami	1	1	100
25	Chihiro Hashimoto	1	1	80
25	Yuu	1	1	80
27	Ran Yu-Yu	2	0	40
27	Toshie Uematsu	2	0	40
29	Chigusa Nagayo	1	2	5
29	Lioness Asuka	1	2	5
