= Rin Kadokura =

Japanese professional wrestler

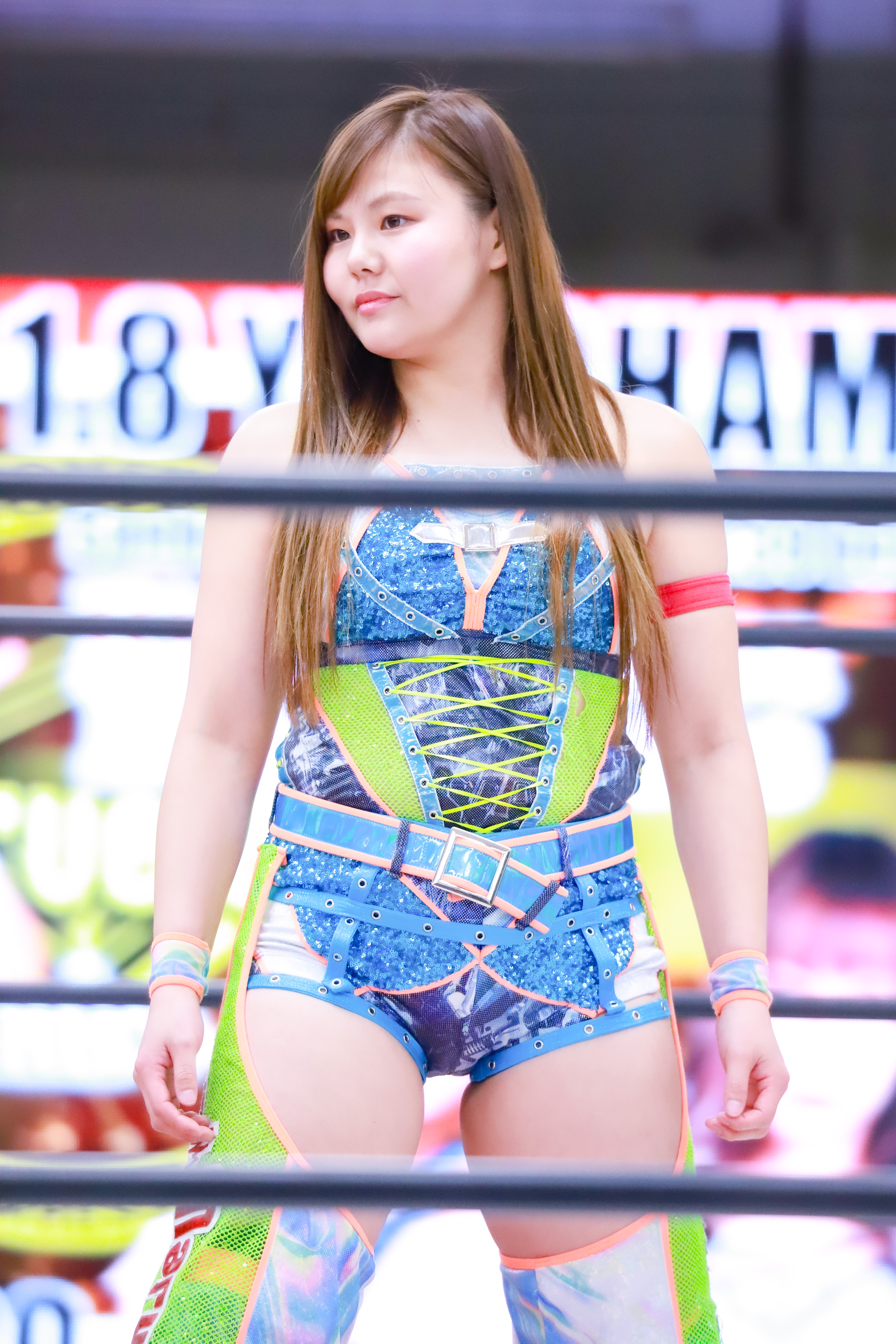
- Kadokura in January 2023

Personal information
- Born: Kazumi Sugiura; February 27, 1993 (age 33) Chiba, Japan
- Spouse: Kennosuke Sasaki (m. 2022)
- Children: 1
- Family: Kensuke Sasaki (father-in-law); Akira Hokuto (mother-in-law)

Professional wrestling career
- Ring name(s): Rin Kadokura; Rin
- Billed height: 156 cm (5 ft 1 in)
- Trained by: Chigusa Nagayo
- Debut: 2016
- Retired: May 5, 2026

Kazumi Sasaki (佐々木一美, Sasaki Kazumi) (née Sugiura), better known by her ring name Rin Kadokura (門倉凛, Kadokura Rin) is a Japanese retired professional wrestler. She is best known for her tenure with the Japanese professional wrestling promotion Pro Wrestling Wave where she is a former Wave Tag Team Champion.

== Professional wrestling career ==
=== Independent circuit (2016–2026) ===
Kadokura made her professional wrestling debut in Seadlinnng, competing at the SEAdLINNNG Let's Go Now event from May 18, 2016, where she teamed up with Takumi Iroha in a losing effort to Sareee and Meiko Tanaka in a tag team match. At a house show hosted by Pure-J on November 8, 2017, she unsuccessfully chellanged Command Bolshoi in a singles match. Kadokura worked for the Marvelous That's Women Pro Wrestling promotion multiple times, having her most notable performance at a house show from August 26, 2017, where she teamed up with Takumi Iroha and Nyla Rose in a losing effort to Jordynne Grace, Tomoko Watanabe and Yuu Yamagata.

=== Sendai Girls' Pro Wrestling (2016-2022) ===
Another promotion for which she worked is Sendai Girls' Pro Wrestling. A notable match in which she competed took place on August 19, 2018, at a promotion's house show where she teamed up with Meiko Satomura, falling short to Riot Crown (Dash Chisako and Kaoru). At Sendai Girls Road To GAEAism, from January 10, 2021, she competed in a 14-person gauntlet match where she teamed up with Hibiki, Maria, Masha Slamovich, Mei Hoshizuki, Mikoto Shindo and Mio Momono as Team Marvelous, scoring a victory against Team Sendai Girls (Chihiro Hashimoto, Dash Chisako, Kanon, Manami, Mika Iwata, Natsuho Kaneko and Yurika Oka).

=== World Wonder Ring Stardom (2017; 2020–2021) ===
She worked in a couple of matches for World Wonder Ring Stardom, first one taking place at a house show from October 1, 2017, where alongside Takumi Iroha, she defeated Team Jungle (Jungle Kyona and Natsuko Tora). She returned after a three-year hiatus on September 28, 2020, at Stardom 5Star Special, where she teamed up again with her NEW-TRA tag partner Takumi Iroha and Mei Hoshizuki, picking up a victory against Queen's Quest (AZM, Momo Watanabe and Utami Hayashishita). At Stardom All Star Dream Cinderella from March 3, 2021, she participated in a 24-women Stardom All-Star rumble won by Unagi Sayaka which portraited the return of many legends from the past such as Kyoko Inoue, Mima Shimoda, Hiroyo Matsumoto, Emi Sakura, Yuzuki Aikawa, Yoko Bito and Haruka Kato.

=== Pro Wrestling Wave (2016–2022) ===
Kadokura made several appearances in Pro Wrestling Wave's signature events such as Catch the Wave, working her first matches at the 2017 edition, placing herself in the Other Than Block and scoring a total of seven points after going against Sareee, Mochi Miyagi and Saki, and then losing to Rina Yamashita in the semi-finals. At the 2019 edition of the event which was also for the vacant Wave Single Championship, she placed herself in the Technical Block and scoring a total of two points after facing Takumi Iroha, Mika Iwata and Sakura Hirota. She also competed in Dual Shock Wave, a one-night tag-team tournament which took place on September 17, 2017, where she teamed up with Takumi Iroha as NEW-TRA to defeat Boss To Mammy (Mio Momono and Yumi Ohka).

=== All Elite Wrestling (2021) ===
Kadokura made her debut in All Elite Wrestling (AEW) on February 15, 2021, taking part in an AEW Women's World Championship Eliminator Tournament which culminated at Revolution, unsuccessfully facing Aja Kong in a first round match. On February 28, 2021, she teamed up with Hikaru Shida and Mei Suruga to defeat Veny, Maki Itoh and Emi Sakura in a six-person tag team match.

=== Retirement ===
After seemingly disappearing from wrestling after a January 2023 match in Marvelous That's Women Pro Wrestling, Kadokura returned to the promotion in December 2025 as simply "Rin". On January 28, 2026, after a tag match loss alongside Itsuki Aoki to Sareee & Takumi Iroha, she announced her retirement for Marvelous' upcoming Yokohama Buntai show, and specifically voiced interest in wrestling her old Stardom tag partner Mayu Iwatani before that date. That match happened for Dream Star Fighting Marigold on February 23, after which Mayu agreed to reunite their tag team for her retirement match. On May 5, the tandem of Blue MaRine defeated Itsuki Aoki & Mio Momono in Rina's final match.

== Personal life ==
It was reported (and later confirmed in an in-ring statement) that Rin Kadokura had married Kensuke Sasaki and Akira Hokuto's eldest son Kennosuke in April 2022. In that same in-ring statement, Kadokura announced that while she was indeed married, she was both continuing her wrestling career as well as continuing to perform under her current ring name. Their daughter was born on August 9, 2023, in Canada.

== Championships and accomplishments ==
- Marvelous That's Women Pro Wrestling
  - AAAW Tag Team Championship (1 time) – with Itsuki Aoki
- Pro Wrestling Wave
  - Wave Tag Team Championship (2 times) – with Itsuki Aoki (1) and Takumi Iroha (1)
  - Catch the Wave Award (1 time)
    - Fighting Spirit Award (2017)
- Sendai Girls' Pro Wrestling
  - Sendai Girls Tag Team Championship (1 time) – with Mio Momono (1)
