= Toshie Uematsu =

Japanese professional wrestler (born 1974)

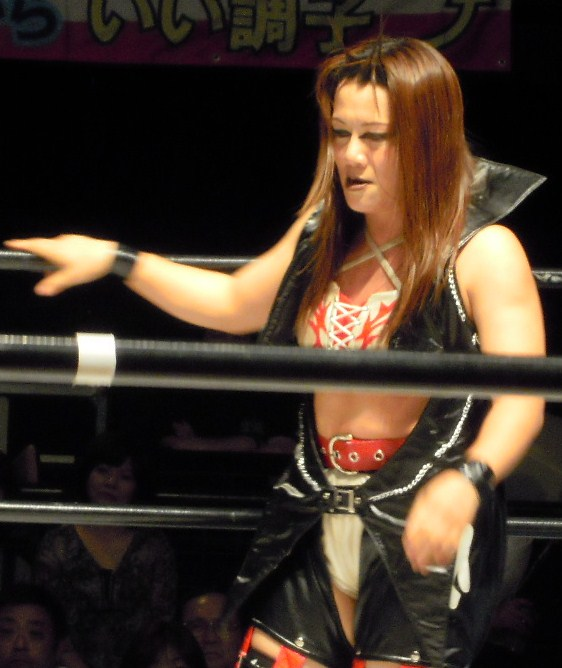
- Uematsu in 2010

Personal information
- Born: April 14, 1974 (age 52) Fujinomiya, Shizuoka, Japan

Professional wrestling career
- Ring name(s): Toshie Uematsu; Tocchan-chan; To-chan; Toshi-A; Super Heel Toshie Uematsu
- Billed height: 1.57 m (5 ft 2 in)
- Billed weight: 59 kg (130 lb)
- Trained by: Chigusa Nagayo
- Debut: April 15, 1995
- Retired: April 30, 2012

Toshie Uematsu (植松 寿絵, Uematsu Toshie; born April 14, 1974) is a female Japanese retired professional wrestler best known for her popularity in the 1990s and 2000s. She was one of the members of the first class of wrestlers trained by Chigusa Nagayo when Nagayo formed the GAEA Japan promotion. Uematsu finished her career in 2012, working for the Pro Wrestling Wave promotion. After her retirement, Uematsu continued working as a trainer for Pro Wrestling Wave.

== Career ==
Toshie Uematsu debuted at the age of 21 on April 15, 1995, at Memorial First Gong, the first show of the GAEA Japan joshi puroresu promotion. In 1997, several GAEA wrestlers, including Uematsu, appeared in World Championship Wrestling (WCW). Uematsu was entered in the inaugural tournament for the newly created women's cruiserweight title. She won the tournament, defeating Malia Hosaka on April 7, 1997, in Hunstville, Alabama to become the first holder of the WCW Women's Cruiserweight Championship. Uematsu lost the belt to Yoshiko Tamura on July 19, 1997, and the belt was abandoned soon afterwards. On February 17, 2004, Uematsu and her partner, Ran Yu-Yu won the AAAW Tag Team Championship for the first time when they beat Chikayo Nagashima and Meiko Satomura by countout (in Japan, a title can change hands on a countout). Uematsu and Yu-Yu were a cunning combo, winning most of their matches by countout after luring their opponents as far away from the ring as they could. They won the belts for the second time on April 3, 2005, defeating Manami Toyota and Carlos Amano. The championship was retired one week later when the GAEA promotion closed; Uematsu and Yu-Yu lost to Sugar Sato and Chikayo Nagashima in a non-title match on the final card. Uematsu has stayed busy since, wrestling as a free-lancer for several joshi promotions. Uematsu returned to the United States on March 12, 2011, when she defeated Madison Eagles at an event promoted by the Chikara promotion. The following day she was defeated by Sara Del Rey at another Chikara event. Uematsu returned to Chikara on December 2, 2011, to take part in the special JoshiMania weekend, losing to Manami Toyota on night one. The following day, Uematsu teamed with GAMI to defeat Cherry and Sawako Shimono in a tag team match. On the third and final night of the tour, Uematsu teamed with The Batiri (Kobald, Kodama and Obariyon) to defeat Cherry and The Colony (Fire Ant, Green Ant and Soldier Ant) in an eight-person tag team match. On April 30, 2012, Uematsu wrestled her retirement match at a Pro Wrestling Wave event, where she and Ran Yu-Yu defeated Moeka Haruhi and Shuu Shibutani in a tag team match. Uematsu made a one-night return to the ring on December 30, 2013, taking part in Gami's retirement match, a 70-person battle royal. Uematsu made another return on March 22, 2014, when she took part in Kaoru's return match at an event produced by Chigusa Nagayo.

== Championships and accomplishments ==
- Dramatic Dream Team

- Ironman Heavymetalweight Championship (4 times)

- GAEA Japan

- AAAW Tag Team Championship (2 times) – with Ran Yu-Yu

- JWP Joshi Puroresu

- Daily Sports Women's Tag Team Championship (3 time) - with Kazuki (1) and Ran Yu-Yu (2)
- JWP Tag Team Championship (5 times) – with Kazuki (1) and Ran Yu-Yu (4)
- JWP Tag League the Best (2012) – with Ran Yu-Yu

- M's Style

- One Day Tag Tournament (2005) – with Ran Yu-Yu

- Nikkan Sports
  - Joshi Tag Team Award (2006, 2008) – with Ran Yu-Yu
  - Joshi Technique Award (2005, 2006, 2008)
- Pro Wrestling Wave

- Wave Tag Team Championship (1 time) – with Ran Yu-Yu

- World Championship Wrestling

- WCW Women's Cruiserweight Championship (1 time)
- WCW Women's Cruiserweight Championship Tournament (1997)
