= Carlos Amano =

Japanese professional wrestler

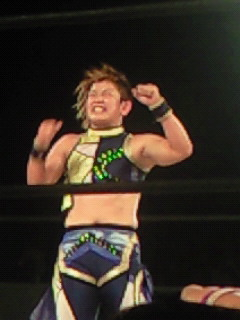
- Amano in June 2010

Personal information
- Born: Rieko Amano; March 16, 1976 (age 50) Shimizu, Shizuoka

Professional wrestling career
- Ring name(s): Carlos Amano; Cutie Rieko; Kamen Tenshi Freia; Rieko Amano
- Billed height: 1.58 m (5 ft 2 in)
- Billed weight: 62 kg (137 lb)
- Debut: December 4, 1994
- Retired: August 17, 2014

Rieko Amano (天野 理恵子, Amano Rieko; born March 16, 1976) is a Japanese retired professional wrestler better known by the ring name Carlos Amano (カルロス天野, Karurosu Amano). Amano made her debut for JWP Joshi Puroresu in December 1994 and early on began also making appearances for the Gaea Japan promotion, where she most notably became one of the four founding members of the Oz Academy stable. Amano joined Gaea Japan full-time in 2002 and remained with the promotion until its folding in 2005, becoming a one-time AAAW Tag Team Champion. Afterwards, Amano began working for Oz Academy, now a full-time promotion, where she went on to become a two-time Oz Academy Openweight Champion and a three-time Oz Academy Tag Team Champion. Amano retired from professional wrestling in August 2014.

== Professional wrestling career ==
=== JWP and Gaea Japan (1994–2005) ===
Amano made her debut under her real name for the JWP Joshi Puroresu on December 4, 1994, when she faced another debutante, Tomoko Miyaguchi, in a singles match. Early on in her career, Amano also began making regular appearances for the Gaea Japan promotion, where, during the summer of 1997, she, Mayumi Ozaki, Chikayo Nagashima and Sugar Sato formed a villainous stable named Oz Academy. On December 8, 1997, Amano also ventured into the world of mixed martial arts, when she took part in an event held by Central Martial Arts Association. Amano won her only MMA fight, when her opponent, Yoko Takahashi, was disqualified for illegally kicking her in the head. Amano won her first championship back in her home promotion, when she and Command Bolshoi defeated Hikari Fukuoka and Tomoko Kuzumi for the JWP Tag Team Championship on January 15, 1999. During the reign, Amano began working under the new ring name "Carlos Amano". After a thirteen-month reign, they lost the title to ZAP I and ZAP T on February 10, 2000. Later that same year, Amano quit JWP to first become a freelancer, continuing to make appearances for Gaea Japan. In November 2002, Amano officially joined Gaea Japan, making the promotion her new home. Amano also made appearances for independent events held by Mayumi Ozaki under the Oz Academy banner, most notably winning the ¥10,000,000,000 Iron Woman Tournament on August 8, 2004, defeating Aja Kong in the finals. On September 20, 2004, Amano won her only title in Gaea Japan, when she and Manami Toyota defeated Aja Kong and Amazing Kong for the AAAW Tag Team Championship. After a six-month reign, they lost the title to Ran Yu-Yu, the former Tomoko Miyaguchi, and Toshie Uematsu, just days before the folding of Gaea Japan. At the promotion's final event on April 10, 2005, Amano was defeated by Aja Kong in a singles match.

=== Oz Academy (2005–2014) ===
Following the folding of Gaea Japan, Amano joined Oz Academy, which Mayumi Ozaki had now turned into a full promotion. Despite being one of the founding members of the Oz Academy stable in Gaea Japan, since 2005, Amano has mainly worked as a member of the Oz Seikigun ("regular army"), opposing the villainous stable, led by Ozaki. In early 2006, Amano, along with several other Oz Academy workers, made her first trip to Mexico, taking part in events held by AAA. Amano returned to AAA in early 2008 to take part in the Reina de Reinas Universal Tournament, from which she was eliminated by Estrellita. On January 13, 2008, Amano defeated Aja Kong to become the second Oz Academy Openweight Champion. The following July, Amano and Dynamite Kansai defeated Chikayo Nagashima and Sonoko Kato to become the inaugural Oz Academy Tag Team Champions. However, Amano's and Kansai's reign lasted less than a month, before they lost the title to D-Fix (Kaoru and Mayumi Ozaki). After a reign of 364 days, Amano lost the Oz Academy Openweight Championship to Mayumi Ozaki on January 11, 2009. Amano regained the title from Manami Toyota on September 21, 2009, and on May 2, 2010, once again became a double champion, when she and Toyota won the Oz Academy Tag Team Championship from Akino and Ran Yu-Yu. After another month-long reign, Amano and Toyota lost the title to Aja Kong and Kaoru Ito. On July 11, 2010, Amano also lost the Oz Academy Openweight Championship to Kaoru. Amano and Toyota won the Oz Academy Tag Team Championship once more on June 26, 2011, by defeating Hiroyo Matsumoto and Tomoka Nakagawa. After a seven-month reign, they lost the title to Aja Kong and Sonoko Kato on January 15, 2012. On August 17, 2014, while recovering from a knee injury, Amano announced that she would be following her doctor's advice and retiring from professional wrestling due to damage to her brainstem. Her official retirement ceremony took place on April 15, 2015.

== Championships and accomplishments ==
- Gaea Japan
  - AAAW Tag Team Championship (1 time) – with Manami Toyota
  - High Spurt 600 Tournament (2004)
- JWP Joshi Puroresu
  - JWP Tag Team Championship (1 time) – with Command Bolshoi
  - 1998 All Generation Tournament
- JDStar
  - TWF World Tag Team Championship (1 time) – with Kamen Tenshi Rosetta
- Ladies Legend Pro-Wrestling
  - LLPW Six Woman Tag Team Championship (1 time) – with Keiko Aono and Mizuki Endo
- Oz Academy
  - Oz Academy Openweight Championship (2 times)
  - Oz Academy Tag Team Championship (3 times) – with Dynamite Kansai (1) and Manami Toyota (2)
  - Iron Woman Singles Tournament (2004)
  - Best Wizard Award (2 times)
    - Happening Award (2014) Amano's sudden retirement
    - Impact Award (2014) Amano's sudden retirement

=== Luchas de Apuestas record ===
Winner (wager)	Loser (wager)	Location	Event	Date	Notes
Carlos Amano (hair)	Mayumi Ozaki (hair)	Tokyo, Japan	Oz Ariake Max	April 12, 2008	(Note: Two Out of Three Falls Dress Up Wild Fight for the Oz Academy Openweight Championship)

=== Mixed martial arts record ===
Professional record breakdown
1 match	1 win	0 losses
By knockout	0	0
By submission	0	0
By decision	0	0
By disqualification	1	0
Draws	0	

Res.	Record	Opponent	Method	Event	Date	Round	Time	Location	Notes
Win	1–0	Yoko Takahashi	DQ (illegal soccer kick)	CMA: Octagon Challenge	December 8, 1997	1	17:25	Nagoya, Japan	
