= Marvelous That's Women Pro Wrestling =

Japanese professional wrestling

- Official logo of the promotion
- Acronym: Marvelous
- Founded: March 22, 2014
- Style: Joshi puroresu
- Headquarters: Funabashi, Chiba, Japan
- Founder: Chigusa Nagayo
- Owner(s): Chigusa Nagayo; Kaoru
- Predecessor: Gaea Japan
- Website: Official website

Marvelous That's Women Pro Wrestling (女子プロレスのマーベラス, Joshi puroresu no māberasu) often abbreviated simply as Marvelous is a Japanese joshi puroresu or women's professional wrestling promotion based in Chiba, Japan. It was founded by Chigusa Nagayo in 2014.

== History ==
According to Chigusa Nagayo, former chairman of All Japan Women's Pro-Wrestling Takashi Matsunaga, who died on July 11, 2009, entrusted his will to her, saying "I want to do it again at Yokohama Arena" in 2012. This referred to his significantly appreciation towards Nagayo's in-ring performance. Just before Matsunaga's death, his father, who died in the spring of 2018, said, "Please show me your professional wrestling skills one more time". Kaoru, who was an ex-ally of Nagayo during their time in Gaea Japan, returned after about three years of fighting illness, and together they put the base of the newfounded promotion of Marvelous That's Women Pro Wrestling. The promotion held its first official event on March 22, 2014, a house show hosted at Ota City General Gymnasium.

Over the years, the promotion has established partnerships with various promotions from the Japanese independent scene. On October 1, 2021, Marvelous held a cross-over event with Pro Wrestling Wave, promotion with which seldomly collaborates, the Marvelous/WAVE Fusion ~ Tommy 40th Anniversary. Marvelous started a professional relationship with World Wonder Ring Stardom at the beginning of 2022, sending various wrestlers from the roster to compete in rookie-based pay-per-views promoted by the latter promotion under the brand of "New Blood". Marvelous was first represented by Ai Houzan and Maria at Stardom New Blood 1 on March 11, 2022.

Since its birth, the promotion never established their own created championships. But at GAEAism Decade Of Quarter Century, an independent event promoted on June 13, 2021, to commemorate sixteen years since the dissolution of Gaea Japan, it was announced that the latter promotion's AAAW Single Championship and AAAW Tag Team Championship would be revived and sanctioned by Marvelous beginning with 2022. On January 10, Takumi Iroha became the first AAAW Single Champion, while on May 1, Itsuki Aoki and Rin Kadokura became the first AAAW Tag Team Champions under Marvelous.

On May 20, 2025, Marvelous announced that their content would be added to the Wrestle Universe streaming service.

== Roster ==
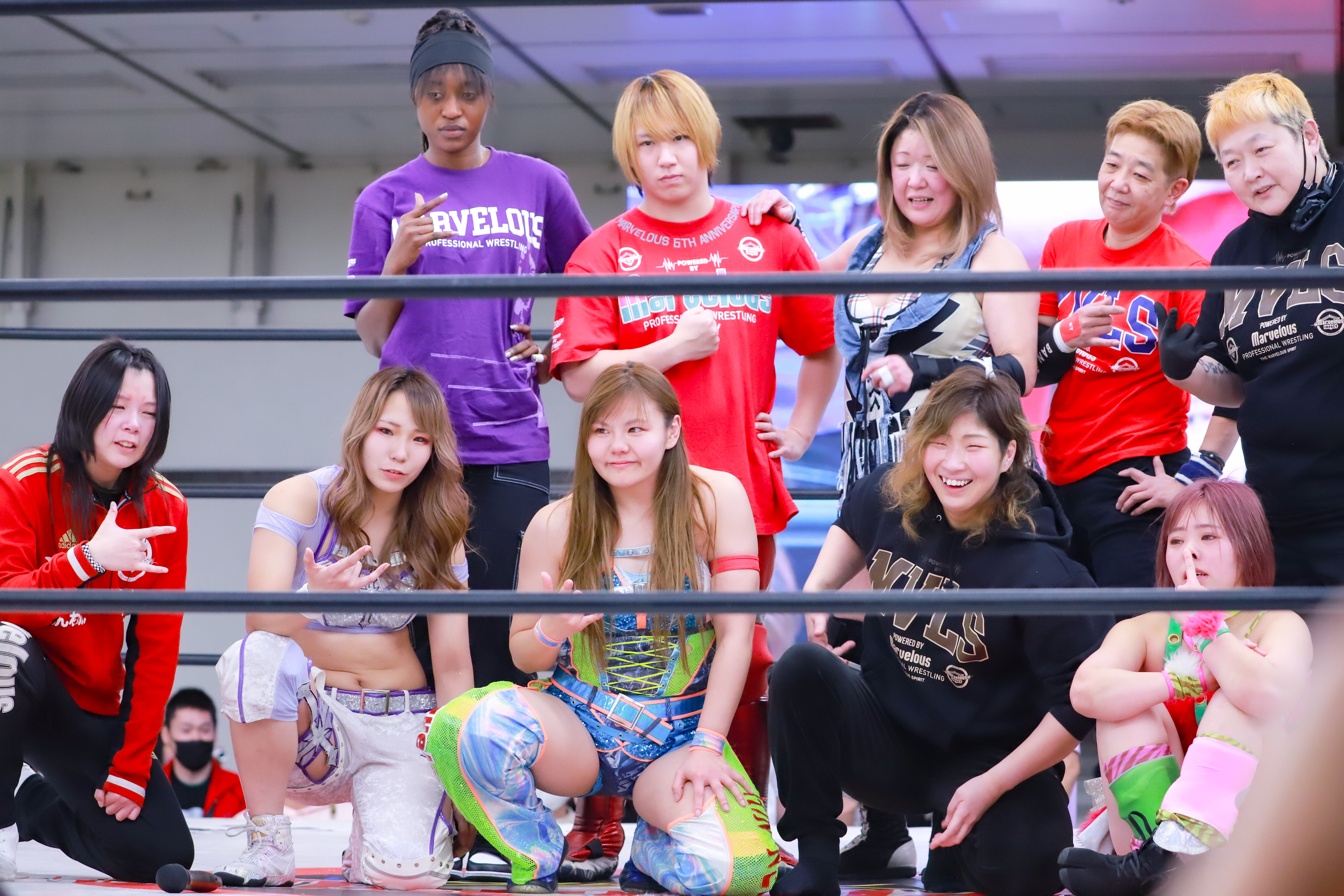
Marvelous roster in January 2023

This is a list of professional wrestlers who currently wrestle for the company. Alumni and notable guest superstars are also included.

=== Active ===
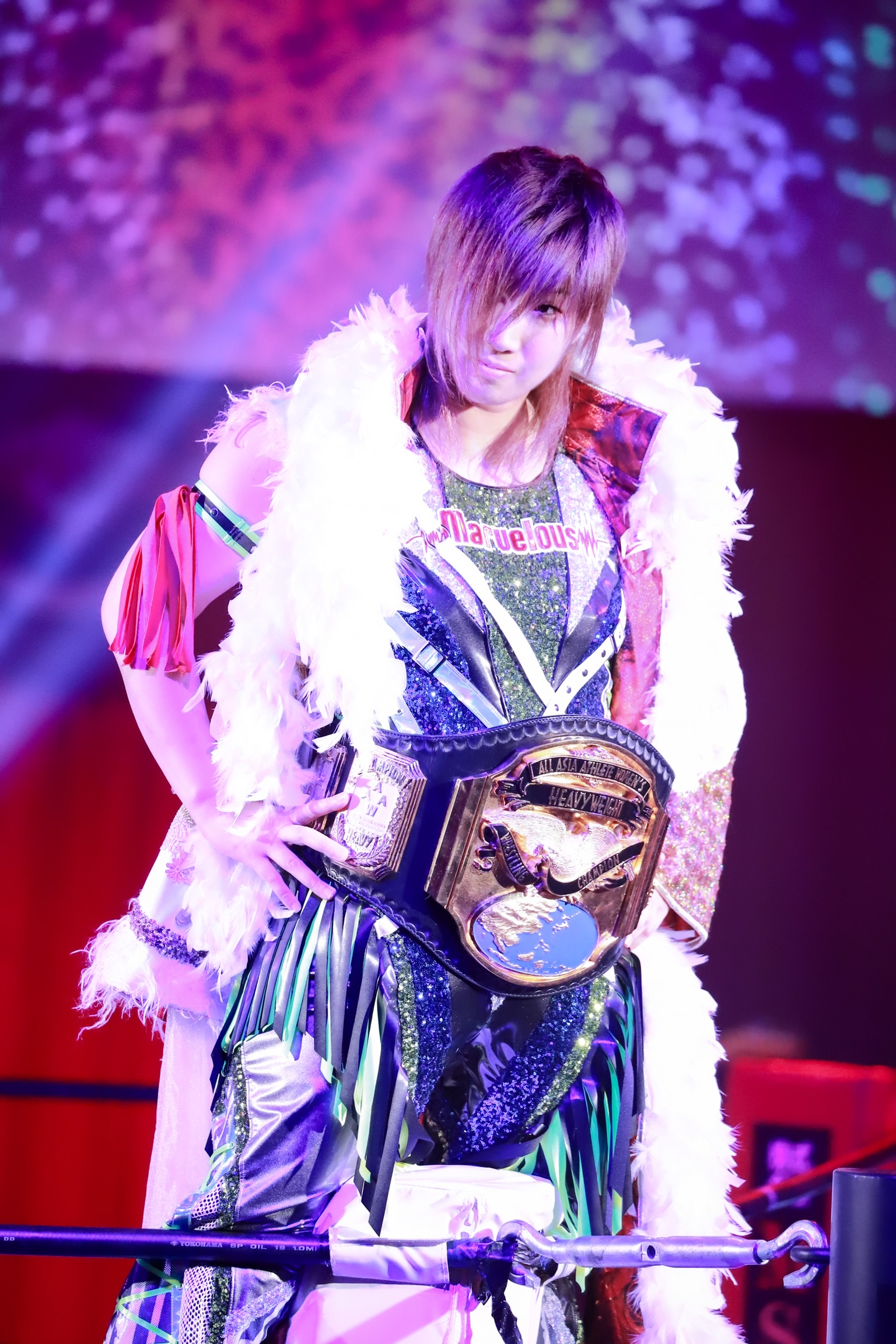
Takumi Iroha

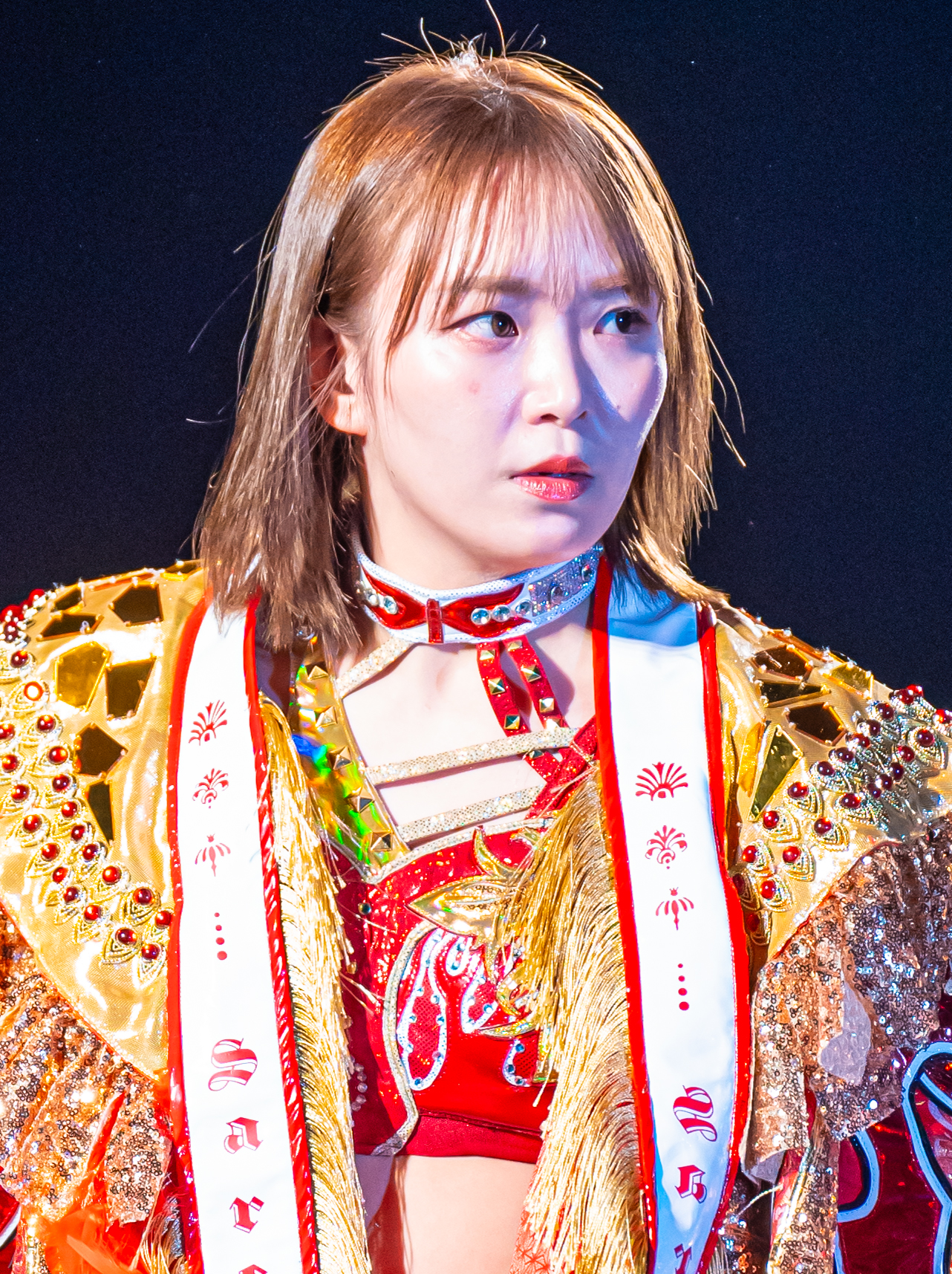
Sareee

Ring name	Real name	Notes
Ai Houzan	Unknown	
Chikayo Nagashima	Unknown	Freelancer
Itsuki Aoki	Unknown	Freelancer
Kaoru Ito	Kaoru Ito	Freelancer
Leo Isaka	Unknown	
Makiko Kato	Unknown	
Maria	Maria Takeda	
Mayumi Ozaki	Mayumi Ozaki	Signed to Oz Academy
Mio Momono	Unknown	
Rin Kadokura	Kazumi Sugiura	Freelancer
Riko Kawahata	Unknown	
Sareee	Sari Fujimura	Freelancer
Senka Akatsuki	Unknown	
Sora Ayame	Unknown	
Takumi Iroha	Takumi Iroha	AAAW Singles Champion
Tomoko Watanabe	Unknown	Freelancer
Yosuke♡Santa Maria	Yosuke Watanabe	Signed to Dragongate
Yurika Oka	Yurika Oka	Signed to Sendai Girls' Pro Wrestling

=== Alumni/guests ===
- Ancham
- Asuka
- Ayame Sasamura
- Chihiro Hashimoto
- Dash Chisako
- Dump Matsumoto
- Hibiki
- Hiroe Nagahama
- Kaoru
- Kyuri
- Kohaku
- Makoto
- Manami
- Mei Hoshizuki
- Megumi Yabushita
- Mikoto Shindo
- Queen Aminata
- Saki
- Sareee
- Saki Akai
- Unagi Sayaka
- Yuki Miyazaki
- Yuna Manase
- Yurika Oka
- Yuu

== Championships ==
Championship	Current champion(s)	Reign	Date won	Days held	Location	Notes
AAAW Single Championship	Takumi Iroha	2	August 8, 2024	757+	Tokyo, Japan	Defeated Mayumi Ozaki at Marvelous 8th Anniversary
AAAW Tag Team Championship	Nightshade and Nyla Rose	1 (1, 1)	May 5, 2026	122+	Tokyo, Japan	Defeated Magenta (Maria and Riko) at Marvelous 10th Anniversary Commemorative Event

== See also ==
- Professional wrestling in Japan
- List of professional wrestling promotions in Japan
