= Oz Academy Tag Team Championship =

Professional wrestling women's tag team championship

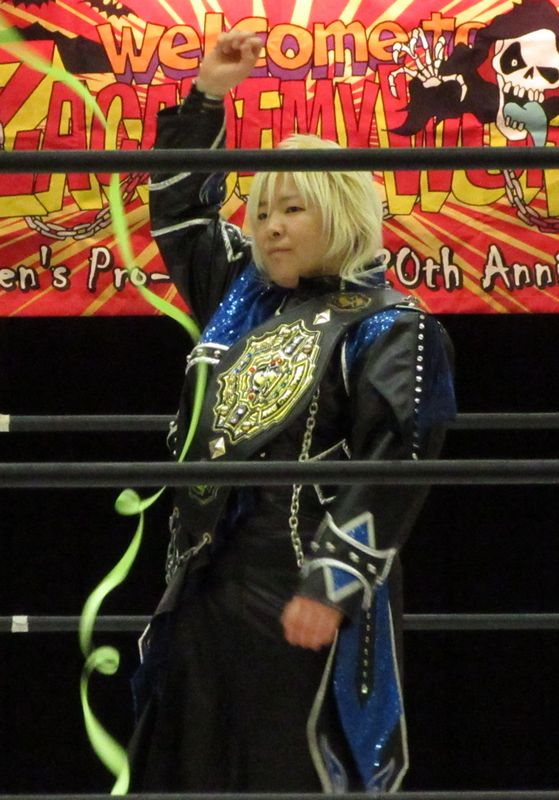
- Tsubasa Kuragaki with one of the Oz Academy Tag Team Championship belts in May 2016

Details
- Promotion: Oz Academy
- Date established: May 9, 2008
- Current champions: Jet Black Oimokabuki (Saori Anou and Unagi Sayaka)
- Date won: August 16, 2026
Statistics
- First champions: Oz Seikigun (Carlos Amano and Dynamite Kansai)
- Most reigns: As a team (3 reigns): Jungle Jack 21 (Hiroyo Matsumoto and Tomoka Nakagawa); SonChika (Chikayo Nagashima and Sonoko Kato); As an individual (7 reigns): Mayumi Ozaki; Sonoko Kato; Hiroyo Matsumoto
- Longest reign: Mission K4 (Akino and Sonoko Kato) (493 days)
- Shortest reign: SonChika (Chikayo Nagashima and Sonoko Kato) (14 days)
- Oldest champion: Jaguar Yokota (61 years, 272 days)
- Youngest champion: Kagetsu (22 years, 250 days)
- Heaviest champion: Aja Kong (103 kg (227 lb)))
- Lightest champion: Chikayo Nagashima and Mio Shirai (52 kg (115 lb)))

The Oz Academy Tag Team Championship is a professional wrestling tag team championship owned by the Oz Academy professional wrestling promotion. The championship was introduced on July 13, 2008, when Carlos Amano and Dynamite Kansai defeated Chikayo Nagashima and Sonoko Kato in the finals of a tournament to become the inaugural champions.

Like most professional wrestling championships, the title is won as a result of a scripted match. There have been a total of forty-two reigns shared among thirty-three teams and thirty-seven wrestlers. Hiroyo Matsumoto and Zones are the current champions in their first reign as a team, while it's the seventh reign individually for Kato and the first for Matsumoto.

== Reigns ==
Carlos Amano and Dynamite Kansai were the first champions in the title's history. SonChika (Chikayo Nagashima and Sonoko Kato) and Jungle Jack 21 (Hiroyo Matsumoto and Tomoka Nakagawa) share the record for most reigns as a team, with three. The former's second reign holds the record for the shortest reign in the title's history, at 14 days, while the latter's third reign holds the record for the longest reign, at 385 days. Mayumi Ozaki, Hiroyo Matsumoto and Sonoko Kato hold the record for most reigns individually, with seven.

== Title history ==
Key
No.	Overall reign number
Reign	Reign number for the specific team—reign numbers for the individuals are in parentheses, if different
Days	Number of days held
Defenses	Number of successful defenses
+	Current reign is changing daily

No.	Champion	Championship change			Reign statistics			Notes	Ref.
No.	Champion	Date	Event	Location	Reign	Days	Defenses	Notes	Ref.
1	Oz Seikigun (Carlos Amano and Dynamite Kansai)	July 13, 2008	OZ-Double Wizard	Tokyo, Japan	1	28	0	Defeated Chikayo Nagashima and Sonoko Kato in the finals of a six tag team tournament to become the inaugural champions.	
2	D-Fix (Kaoru and Mayumi Ozaki)	August 10, 2008	Plum Mariko Memorial - Day 1	Tokyo, Japan	1	179	0	This was a Two Out of Three Falls Hairs vs. Hairs match.	
3	Jungle Jack 21 (Aja Kong and Hiroyo Matsumoto)	February 5, 2009	OZ-The Perfect Taboo!	Tokyo, Japan	1	17	0		
4	SonChika (Chikayo Nagashima and Sonoko Kato)	February 22, 2009	The Country of OZ	Tokyo, Japan	1	101	2		
5	D-Fix (Kaoru and Mayumi Ozaki)	June 3, 2009	OZ-Show Women	Tokyo, Japan	2	60	1		
6	SonChika (Chikayo Nagashima and Sonoko Kato)	August 2, 2009	OZ-Let's Party	Tokyo, Japan	2	14	0		
7	Jungle Jack 21 (Akino and Ran Yu-Yu)	August 16, 2009	Plum Hanasaku ~ Country of OZ	Tokyo, Japan	1	259	5		
8	Oz Seikigun (Carlos Amano and Manami Toyota)	May 2, 2010	Free and Easy at Osaka	Osaka, Japan	1 (2, 1)	42	0		
9	Aja Kong and Kaoru Ito	June 13, 2010	Dream Girls	Tokyo, Japan	1 (2, 1)	28	0		
10	Jungle Jack 21 (Akino and Ran Yu-Yu)	July 11, 2010	Summer Factor	Tokyo, Japan	2	42	0		
11	SonChika (Chikayo Nagashima and Sonoko Kato)	August 22, 2010	Country of OZ - Night 2	Tokyo, Japan	3	231	3		
12	Jungle Jack 21 (Hiroyo Matsumoto and Tomoka Nakagawa)	April 10, 2011	One Night in Heaven	Tokyo, Japan	1 (2, 1)	77	1		
13	Oz Seikigun (Carlos Amano and Manami Toyota)	June 26, 2011	Unbalanced	Tokyo, Japan	2 (3, 2)	203	1		
14	Aja Kong and Sonoko Kato	January 15, 2012	The Wizard of OZ	Tokyo, Japan	1 (3, 4)	217	2		
15	Akino and Ayumi Kurihara	August 19, 2012	Plum Hanasaku ~ Country of OZ	Tokyo, Japan	1 (3, 1)	175	0		
16	Seiki-gun (Mayumi Ozaki and Yumi Ohka)	February 10, 2013	Expansion	Tokyo, Japan	1 (3, 1)	28	0		
17	Jungle Jack 21 (Hiroyo Matsumoto and Tomoka Nakagawa)	March 10, 2013	Yokohama Monster House	Yokohama, Kanagawa, Japan	2 (3, 2)	45	0		
18	Aja Kong and Hikaru Shida	April 24, 2013	Wednesdays Showdown	Tokyo, Japan	1 (4, 1)	109	0		
19	Jungle Jack 21 (Hiroyo Matsumoto and Tomoka Nakagawa)	August 11, 2013	Plum Hanasaku ~ Country of OZ	Tokyo, Japan	3 (4, 3)	386	2		
—	Vacated	September 1, 2014	—	Osaka, Japan	—	—	—	The championship was vacated due to Hiroyo Matsumoto being sidelined with a knee injury.	
20	Ozakura Princess (Mayumi Ozaki and Sakura Hirota)	September 23, 2014	Heart on Wave	Tokyo, Japan	1 (4, 1)	159	1	Defeated Aja Kong and Tsubasa Kuragaki in the finals of a five tag team tournament to win the vacant championship.	
21	Mission K4 (Kagetsu and Kaho Kobayashi)	March 1, 2015	Forgiveness	Tokyo, Japan	1	140	1		
22	Seiki-gun (Mayumi Ozaki and Mio Shirai)	July 19, 2015	2Bad	Tokyo, Japan	1 (5, 1)	35	0		
23	Mission K4 (Kagetsu and Kaho Kobayashi)	August 23, 2015	Plum Hanasaku ~ Country of OZ: Yokohama Dreams Park 3	Yokohama, Kanagawa, Japan	2	112	0		
24	Kaori Yoneyama and Tsubasa Kuragaki	December 13, 2015	Loaded	Tokyo, Japan	1	273	1		
25	Hikaru Shida and Syuri	September 11, 2016	The Dynamite 2	Tokyo, Japan	1 (2, 1)	287	3		
26	Mission K4 (Akino and Kaho Kobayashi)	June 25, 2017	Voyager	Yokohama, Kanagawa, Japan	1 (4, 3)	126	1		
27	Seiki-gun (Maya Yukihi and Mayumi Ozaki)	October 29, 2017	Yokohama Undersea Unexplored Expedition	Yokohama, Kanagawa, Japan	1 (1, 6)	323	1		
28	Borderless (Rina Yamashita and Yoshiko)	September 17, 2018	Flower Bloom in Yokohama	Yokohama, Kanagawa, Japan	1	76	0	This was a title vs. title match in which Yamashita and Yoshiko also defended the Beyond the Sea Tag Team Championship.	
29	Beast Friend (Hiroyo Matsumoto and Kaori Yoneyama)	December 2, 2018	Connect to the Future	Tokyo, Japan	1 (5, 2)	161	1		
30	Seiki-gun (Maya Yukihi and Saori Anou)	May 12, 2019	Something is Happening Tonight	Tokyo, Japan	1 (2, 1)	105	0		
31	Mission K4 (Akino and Sonoko Kato)	August 25, 2019	Plum Hanasaku ~ Oz No Kuni 2019 Yokohama Shining	Yokohama, Kanagawa, Japan	1 (5, 5)	493	2		
32	Mission K4 (Kaho Kobayashi and Kakeru Sekiguchi)	December 30, 2020	The End of the Year	Tokyo, Japan	1 (4, 1)	95	1		
33	Beast Friend (Kaori Yoneyama and Yuu)	April 4, 2021	Oz Academy Silver Bullet	Tokyo, Japan	1 (3, 1)	35	0		
34	Itsuki Aoki and Tsubasa Kuragaki	May 9, 2021	OZ Academy Spring Storm Assault	Tokyo, Japan	1 (1, 2)	235	1		
35	Chin Crushers (Hiroyo Matsumoto and Rina Yamashita)	December 30, 2021	I See the Light - Day 2	Tokyo, Japan	1 (6, 2)	365	3		
36	Team 200 kg (Chihiro Hashimoto and Yuu)	December 30, 2022	The Anthem For 2022 At Korakuen Hall	Tokyo, Japan	1 (1, 2)	72	0		
37	H2D (Ryo Mizunami and Sonoko Kato)	March 12, 2023	OZ Academy Who Knows?	Tokyo, Japan	1 (1, 6)	42	0		
38	Age 115 (Jaguar Yokota and Mayumi Ozaki)	April 23, 2023	OZ Academy Battle Big Bonus In Korakuen 2023	Tokyo, Japan	1 (1, 7)	385	2		
39	H2D (Ryo Mizunami and Sonoko Kato)	May 12, 2024	OZ Academy Paradise Lost	Tokyo, Japan	2 (2, 7)	232	3		
40	Fukuoka Double Crazy (Hazuki and Koguma)	December 30, 2024	OZ Academy Eternal Sparkle	Tokyo, Japan	1 (1, 1)	104	2		
41	Phantom Limit (Kohaku and Tsubasa Kuragaki)	April 13, 2025	OZ Academy Battle Big Bonus 2025	Tokyo, Japan	1 (1, 3)	126	1		
42	Gojizones Union (Hiroyo Matsumoto and Zones)	August 17, 2025	OZ Academy Plum No Hanasaku OZ No Kuni 2025	Tokyo, Japan	1 (7, 1)	364	3		
43	Jet Black Oimokabuki (Saori Anou and Unagi Sayaka)	August 16, 2026	OZ Academy OZ 30th & OZAKI 40th	Tokyo, Japan	1 (2, 1)	98+	1		

== Combined reigns ==
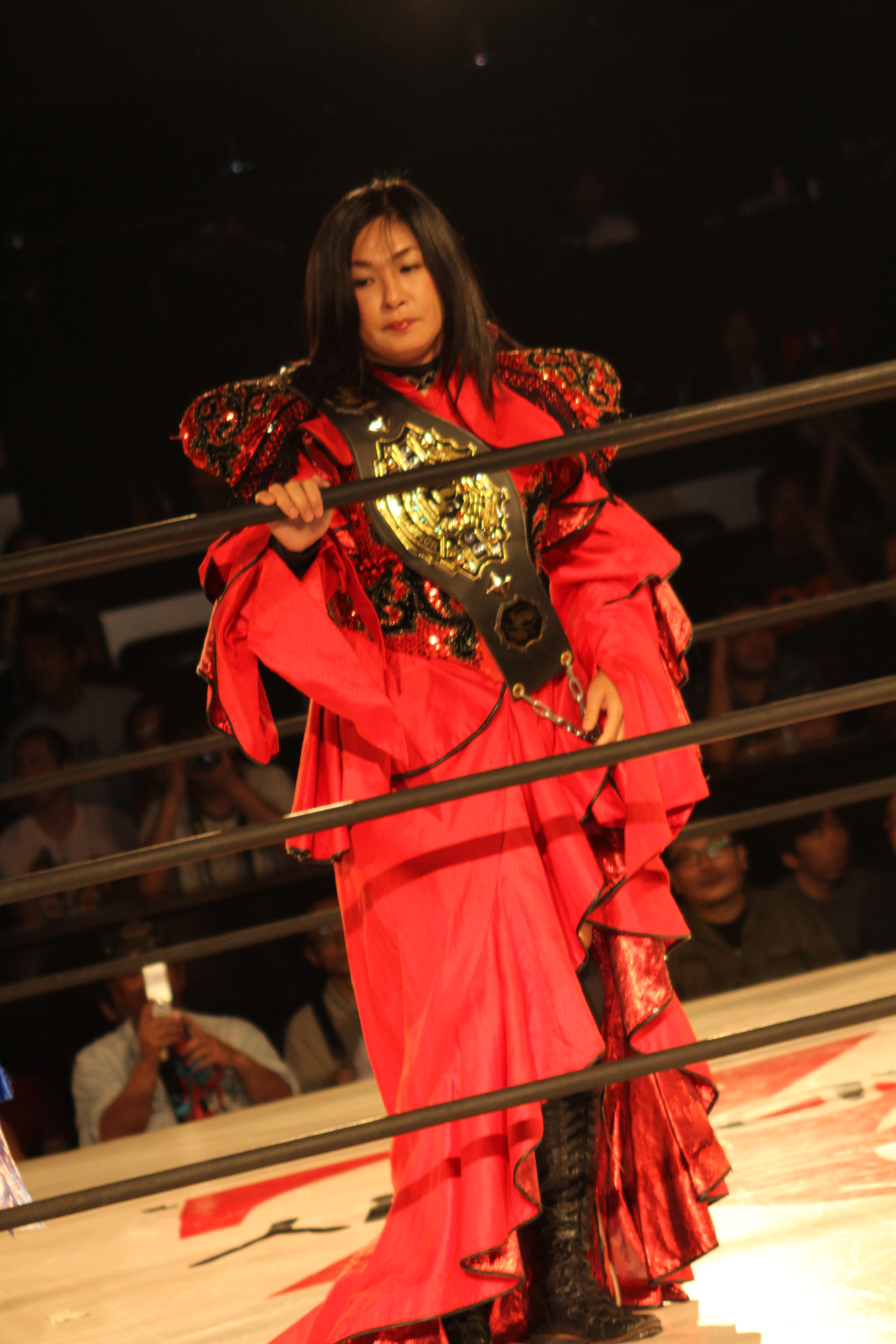
Manami Toyota, former two-time Oz Academy Tag Team Champion, with one of the title belts in July 2011

As of November 22, 2026

†	Indicates the current champions

=== By team ===
Rank	Team	No. of reigns	Combined defenses	Combined days
1	Jungle Jack 21 (Hiroyo Matsumoto and Tomoka Nakagawa)	3	3	507
2	Mission K4 (Akino and Sonoko Kato)	1	2	493
3	Age 115 (Jaguar Yokota and Mayumi Ozaki)	1	2	385
4	Hiroyo Matsumoto and Rina Yamashita	1	3	365
5	Gojizones Union (Hiroyo Matsumoto and Zones)	1	3	364
6	SonChika (Chikayo Nagashima and Sonoko Kato)	3	5	346
7	Seiki-gun (Maya Yukihi and Mayumi Ozaki)	1	1	323
8	Jungle Jack 21 (Akino and Ran Yu-Yu)	2	5	301
9	Hikaru Shida and Syuri	1	3	287
10	H2D (Ryo Mizunami and Sonoko Kato)	2	3	274
11	Kaori Yoneyama and Tsubasa Kuragaki	1	1	273
12	Mission K4 (Kagetsu and Kaho Kobayashi)	2	1	252
13	Oz Seikigun (Carlos Amano and Manami Toyota)	2	1	245
14	D-Fix (Kaoru and Mayumi Ozaki)	2	1	239
15	Itsuki Aoki and Tsubasa Kuragaki	1	1	235
16	Aja Kong and Sonoko Kato	1	2	217
17	Akino and Ayumi Kurihara	1	0	175
18	Beast Friend (Hiroyo Matsumoto and Kaori Yoneyama)	1	1	161
19	Ozakura Princess (Mayumi Ozaki and Sakura Hirota)	1	1	159
20	Phantom Limit (Kohaku and Tsubasa Kuragaki)	1	1	126
20	Mission K4 (Akino and Kaho Kobayashi)	1	1	126
22	Aja Kong and Hikaru Shida	1	0	109
23	Seiki-gun (Maya Yukihi and Saori Anou)	1	0	105
24	Fukuoka Double Crazy (Hazuki and Koguma)	1	2	104
25	Jet Black Oimokabuki † (Saori Anou and Unagi Sayaka)	1	1	98+
26	Mission K4 (Kaho Kobayashi and Kakeru Sekiguchi)	1	1	95
27	Borderless (Rina Yamashita and Yoshiko)	1	0	76
28	Team 200 kg (Chihiro Hashimoto and Yuu)	1	0	72
29	Beast Friend (Kaori Yoneyama and Yuu)	1	0	35
29	Seiki-gun (Mayumi Ozaki and Mio Shirai)	1	0	35
31	Aja Kong and Kaoru Ito	1	0	28
31	Oz Seikigun (Carlos Amano and Dynamite Kansai)	1	0	28
31	Seiki-gun (Mayumi Ozaki and Yumi Ohka)	1	0	28
34	Jungle Jack 21 (Aja Kong and Hiroyo Matsumoto)	1	0	17

=== By wrestler ===
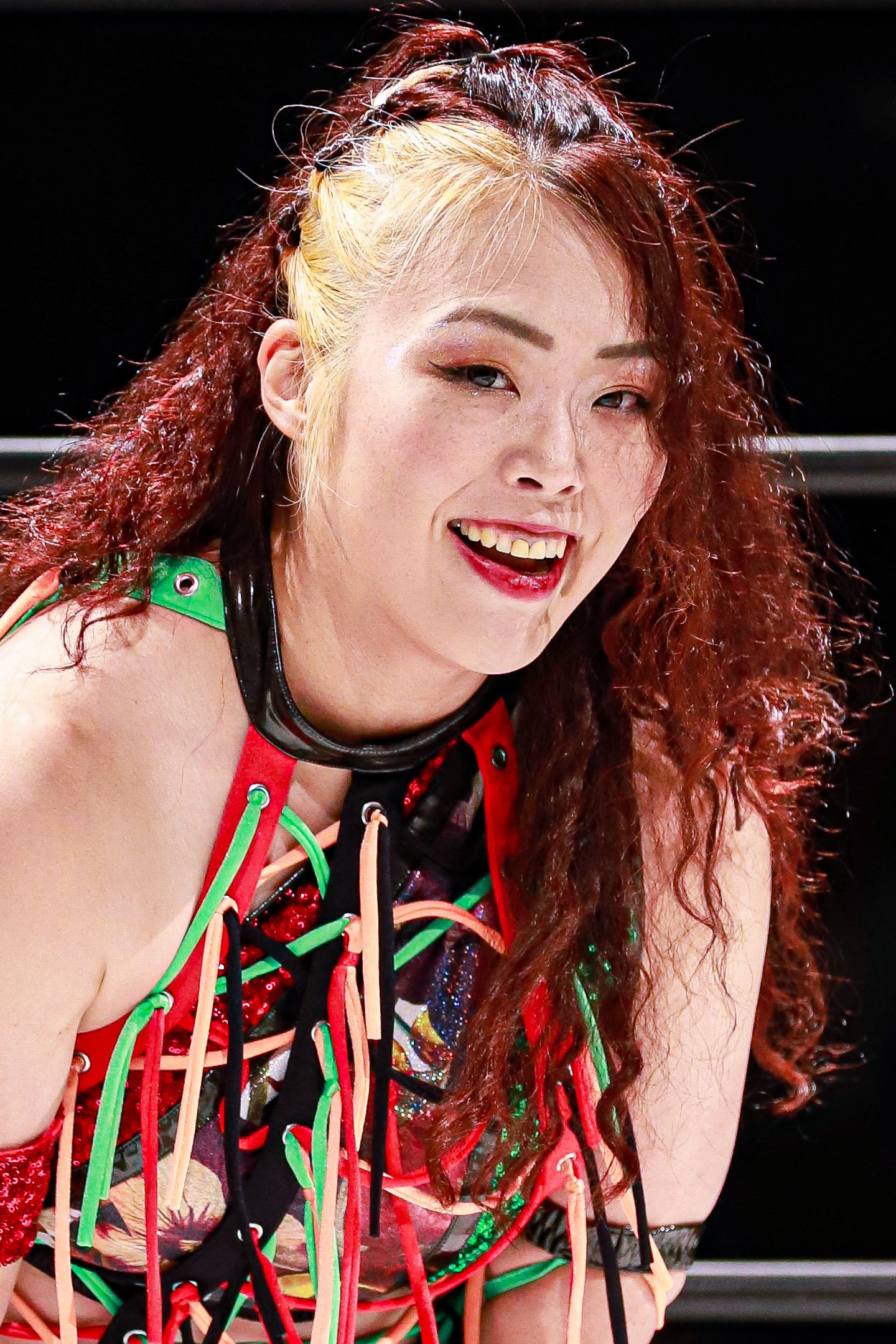
Record tying seven-time champion individually, Hiroyo Matsumoto, who is the longest combined-reigning champion at 1,415 days.

Rank	Wrestler	No. of reigns	Combined defenses	Combined days
1	Hiroyo Matsumoto	7	9	1,415
2	Sonoko Kato	7	12	1,330
3	Mayumi Ozaki	7	5	1,169
4	Akino	5	8	1,095
5	Tsubasa Kuragaki	3	3	634
6	Tomoka Nakagawa	3	3	507
7	Kaho Kobayashi	4	3	473
8	Kaori Yoneyama	3	2	469
9	Rina Yamashita	2	3	441
10	Maya Yukihi	2	1	428
11	Hikaru Shida	2	3	396
12	Jaguar Yokota	1	2	385
13	Aja Kong	4	2	371
14	Zones	1	3	364
15	Chikayo Nagashima	3	5	346
16	Ran Yu-Yu	2	5	301
17	Syuri	1	3	287
18	Ryo Mizunami	2	3	274
19	Carlos Amano	3	1	273
20	Kagetsu	2	1	252
21	Manami Toyota	2	1	245
22	Kaoru	2	1	239
23	Itsuki Aoki	1	1	235
24	Saori Anou †	2	1	203+
25	Ayumi Kurihara	1	0	175
26	Sakura Hirota	1	1	159
27	Kohaku	1	1	126
28	Yuu	2	0	107
29	Hazuki	1	2	104
29	Koguma	1	2	104
31	Unagi Sayaka †	1	1	98+
32	Kakeru Sekiguchi	1	1	95
33	Yoshiko	1	0	76
34	Chihiro Hashimoto	1	0	72
35	Mio Shirai	1	0	35
36	Dynamite Kansai	1	0	28
36	Kaoru Ito	1	0	28
36	Yumi Ohka	1	0	28

== See also ==
- Goddesses of Stardom Championship
- International Ribbon Tag Team Championship
- JWP Tag Team Championship
- Wave Tag Team Championship
- Women's World Tag Team Championship
