= Hiroyo Matsumoto =

Japanese professional wrestler

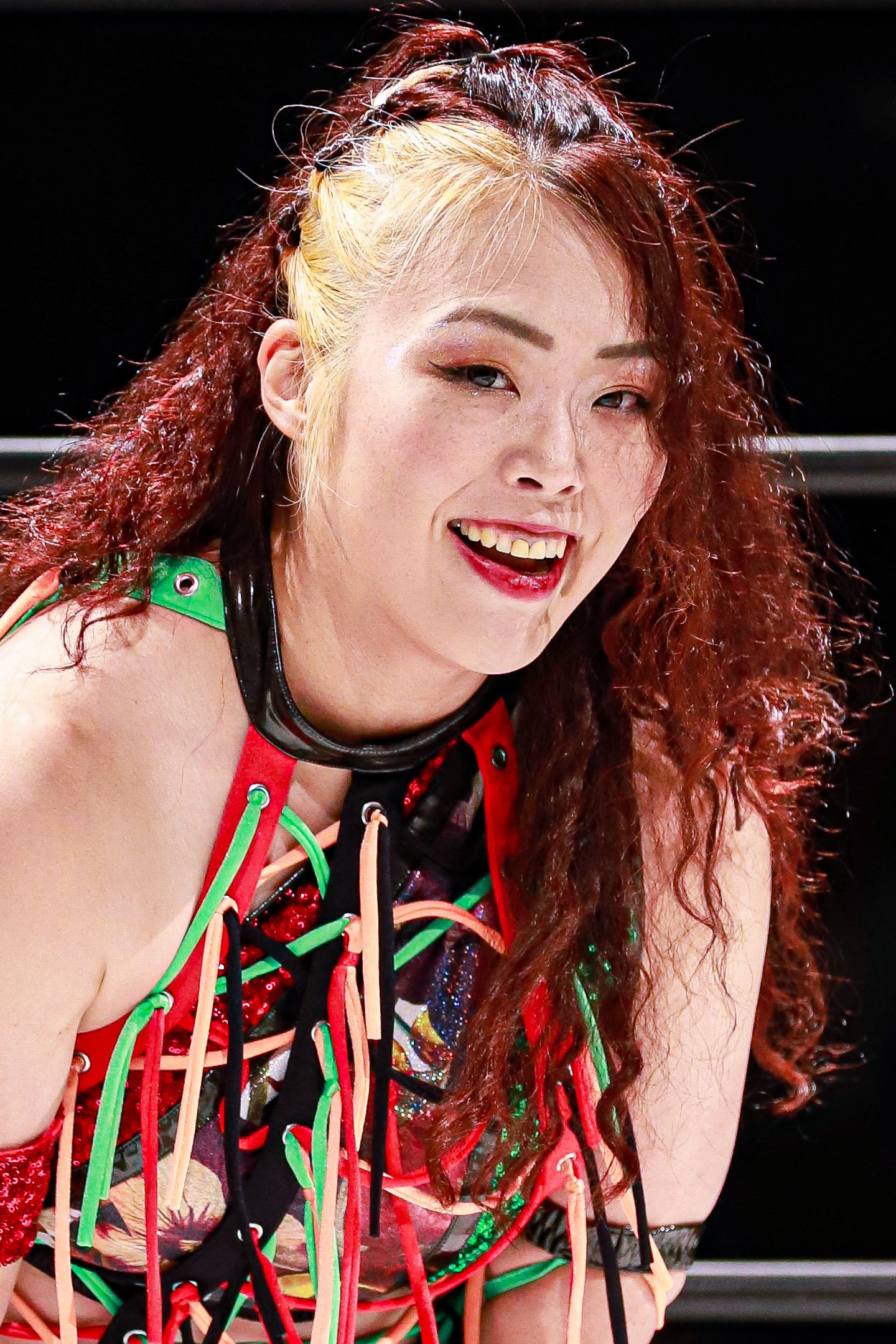
- Matsumoto in July 2023

Personal information
- Born: November 6, 1985 (age 40) Hiratsuka, Kanagawa

Professional wrestling career
- Ring name(s): Hiroyo Matsumoto; Hiroyo Moe Moe; Kaihime; Masked Hiroyon
- Billed height: 1.66 m (5 ft 5 1/2 in)
- Billed weight: 70 kg (154 lb)
- Trained by: Mariko Yoshida
- Debut: 2006

Hiroyo Matsumoto (松本 浩代, Matsumoto Hiroyo; born November 6, 1985) is a Japanese professional wrestler, currently working as a freelancer. Emi Sakura gave her the nickname of Lady Destroyer (破壊する女, Hakai Suru Onna) because Matsumoto broke a wall in the Ichigaya arena during her Ice Ribbon debut. She is best known with other wrestling promotions such as Oz Academy and Seadlinnng. She graduated from Hiratsuka Konan High School in the Kanagawa Prefecture.

== Professional wrestling career ==
=== Career beginnings and Japan (2006–present) ===
On March 19, 2006, Matsumoto had a pre-debut 5-minute exhibition match in Shin-Kiba 1st Ring against Mai Ichii. On July 16, Matsumoto had her official debut match against Hanako Kobayashi in Shinjuku Face, winning in 6:38 with a Body Slam.

On May 5, 2007, Matsumoto teamed with Shuu Shibutani to face veterans Mariko Yoshida and Meiko Satomura. She scored the pinfall against mentor Mariko Yoshida with her Backdrop Driver finisher. On October 7, Matsumoto teamed with fellow Ibuki worker Tomoka Nakagawa to debut in Ice Ribbon, with the pair scoring the victory over Aoi Kizuki & Miki Ishii.

On January 12, 27, and February 11, 2008, Matsumoto participated in and won the 「NEO STAGE08」 singles tournament. On March 2, Matsumoto challenged Haruka Matsuo for the NWA Women's Pacific/NEO Single Championship, and was defeated. On April 20, May 23 & June 27, Matsumoto participated in the Sendai Girls' Pro Wrestling's Jaja Uma Tournament - winning the tournament by defeating Sendai Girls' Pro Wrestling's own Ryo Mizunami in the finals. On July 1, Matsumoto teamed with Dramatic Dream Team (DDT) wrestler Choun Shiryu for an unsuccessful challenge for Ice Ribbon's International Ribbon Tag Team Championship, held by Etsuko Mita and Makoto. On July 13, Matsumoto partnered with Kyoko Inoue to win the NEO Midsummer Tag Tournament. On October 12, in OZ Academy's open league to determine the next OZ Academy Openweight Championship challenger, Matsumoto defeated veteran and mentor Aja Kong via over the top rope. Following the match, she was admitted into Kong's stable - Jungle Jack 21. On November 1, at the Ice Ribbon Senbonzakura Hall show, Matsumoto had a singles bout with Ayako Hamada. On December 21, at the Ibuki show at the Korakuen Hall, Matsumoto won her first singles title by defeating JWP Joshi Puroresu's Arisa Nakajima for the JWP Junior and Princess of Pro-Wrestling Championships. On December 31, Matsumoto achieved her 150th pro wrestling match in a tag match, with Matsumoto partnering with Makoto against Aoi Kizuki and Riho (One-fourth of her 150 matches took place in Ice Ribbon).

On February 1, 2009, at the Ibuki show in Shin-Kiba 1st Ring, Matsumoto faced Sendai Sachiko for the JWP Junior Title/POP Title. She was successful in the first defense of the junior double titles. On February 5, at the OZ Academy show in Shinjuku Face, Matsumoto partnered with Aja Kong to defeat Mayumi Ozaki and KAORU and win the OZ Academy Tag Team Championship, thus making Matsumoto a triple crown champion. On February 8, at the JWP/NEO double header at the Tokyo Cinema Club, Matsumoto defeated JWP's Pinky Mayuka for her second successful defense of the JWP Junior/POP double titles. On March 29, Matsumoto partnered with Kyoko Inoue to win the NEO Tag Titles. On May 31, at the Ibuki Korakuen Hall show, Matsumoto lost the JWP Junior/POP double titles to fellow Ibuki wrestler and close friend Misaki Ohata. On August 29, at the NEO in Osaka, Matsumoto and Kyoko Inoue faced Passion Red team of Nanae Takahashi and Kana for the NEO Tag Titles. Matsumoto and Inoue defended the titles by time limit draw. On October 10, Matsumoto and Kyoko Inoue had a rematch against Passion Red's Nanae Takahashi and Kana at the NEO Shin-Kiba 1st Ring show and lost the NEO Tag Titles. During the match, Matsumoto also injured her foot. On November 8, in her return match from foot injury, Matsumoto faced Atsuko Emoto at the Ibuki show at Korakuen Hall.

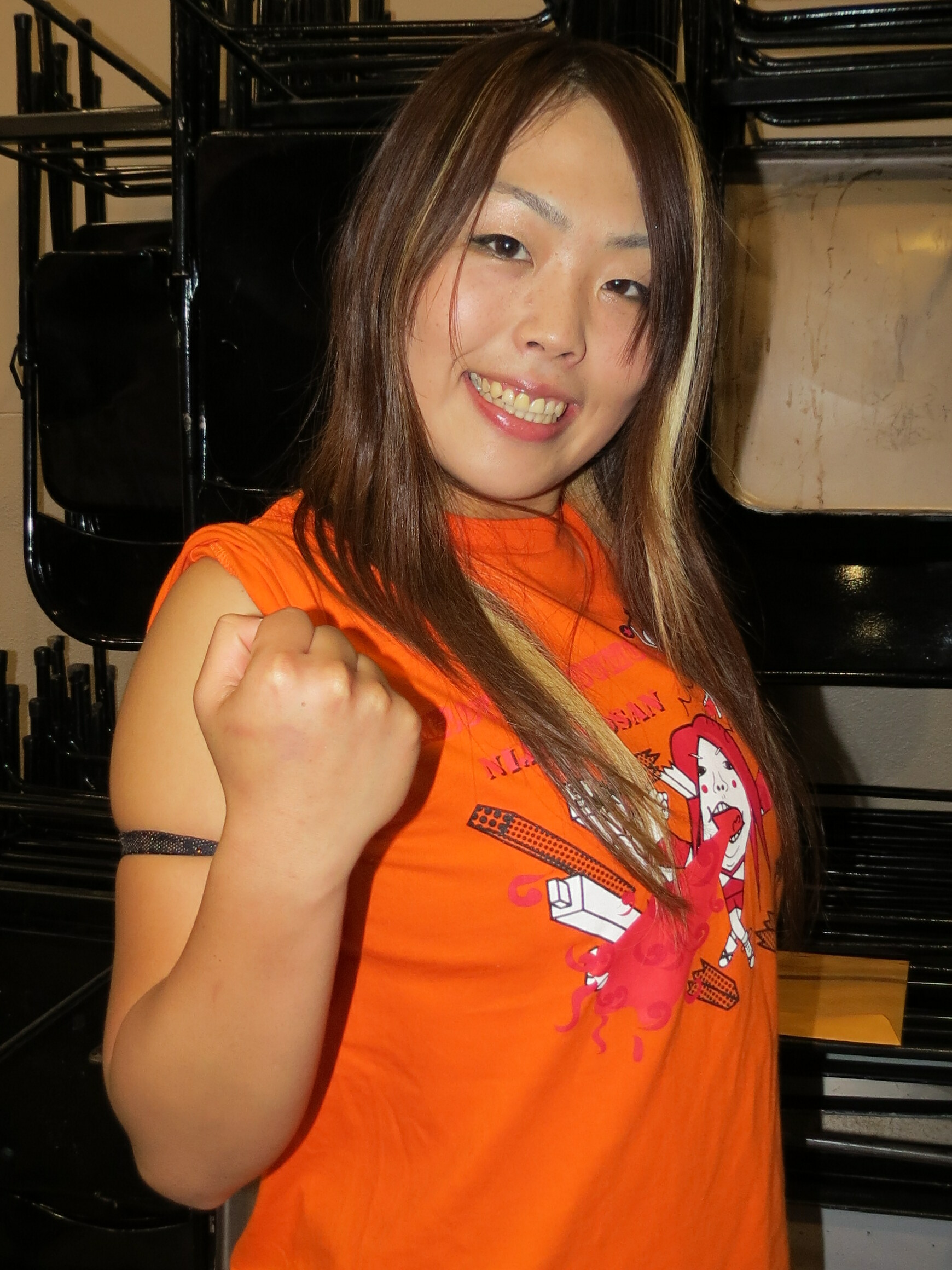
Matsumoto in 2012

On January 4, 2010, at the Ice Ribbon show in Shin-Kiba 1st Ring, Matsumoto teamed up with Ice Ribbon wrestler Hamuko Hoshi to face Nanae Takahashi and Mai Ichii for the recently vacated International Ribbon Tag Titles. Matsumoto and Hoshi were successful in winning the tag titles. On February 20, Matsumoto and Hoshi lost the International Ribbon Tag Titles to Nanae Takahashi and Kazumi Shimouma. On April 9, Matsumoto participated in Sendai Girls' Pro Wrestling's 2nd annual Battlefield Tournament, but lost to Ryo Mizunami in Round 1. On April 10 & April 11, Matsumoto made her U.S. debut when she appeared in the Shimmer Women Athletes' DVD tapings in Berwyn, IL. During that weekend, Matsumoto faced the likes of Sara Del Rey, Lufisto, and Mercedes Martinez. On July 25, Matsumoto made her second challenge for the NWA Women's Pacific/NEO Single Championship, this time held by NEO's Yoshiko Tamura. Matsumoto lost the match but forced Tamura to use her top finisher - Mt. Cook to end the match.

On March 26, 2011, at the Shimmer Women Athletes show in Berwyn, Illinois, Matsumoto and Misaki Ohata, as the Seven Star Sisters, won the Shimmer Tag Team Championship from the Canadian NINJAs (Portia Perez and Nicole Matthews), and then successfully defended them against Britani Knight and Saraya Knight. They would lose the title to Daizee Haze and Tomoka Nakagawa the following day. On September 23, at an OZ Academy show, Matsumoto turned on the Jungle Jack 21 stable and joined Mayumi Ozaki's villainous Seikigun stable.

In 2012, Matsumoto began working regularly for World Wonder Ring Stardom, unsuccessfully challenging Nanae Takahashi for the World of Stardom Championship on May 3 and joining Yuzuki Aikawa's Zenryoku Joshi stable on June 3. On June 10, Matsumoto defeated Ran Yu-Yu in the finals of a tournament to become the number one contender to the Oz Academy Openweight Championship. On August 19, Matsumoto unsuccessfully challenged Chikayo Nagashima for the Oz Academy Openweight Championship. On October 27, Matsumoto returned to Shimmer Women Athletes and the following day, unsuccessfully challenged Saraya Knight for the Shimmer Championship in a four-way elimination match, which also included Kellie Skater and MsChif. On December 2, Matsumoto officially quit Mayumi Ozaki's Seikigun stable and returned to Jungle Jack 21.

On March 10, 2013, Matsumoto and Tomoka Nakagawa defeated Mayumi Ozaki and Yumi Ohka to win the Oz Academy Tag Team Championship for the second time. On April 24, Matsumoto and Nakagawa lost the title to Aja Kong and Hikaru Shida. On August 11, Matsumoto and Nakagawa regained the Oz Academy Tag Team Championship from Kong and Shida. On October 19, Matsumoto returned to Shimmer and on Volume 59 unsuccessfully challenged Cheerleader Melissa for the Shimmer Championship. On October 25, Matsumoto made her debut for Shimmer's sister promotion, Shine Wrestling, unsuccessfully challenging Rain for the Shine Championship in the main event. On December 29, Matsumoto won her first title in Stardom, when she, Mayu Iwatani and Miho Wakizawa defeated the Kimura Monster-gun (Alpha Female, The Female Predator "Amazon" and Kyoko Kimura) for the Artist of Stardom Championship.

On August 10, 2014, Matsumoto, Iwatani and Wakizawa lost the Artist of Stardom Championship to Hatsuhinode Kamen, Kaori Yoneyama and Tsubasa Kuragaki in their fifth defense. On August 31, Matsumoto and Tomoka Nakagawa vacated the Oz Academy Tag Team Championship due to Matsumoto being sidelined with a knee injury.

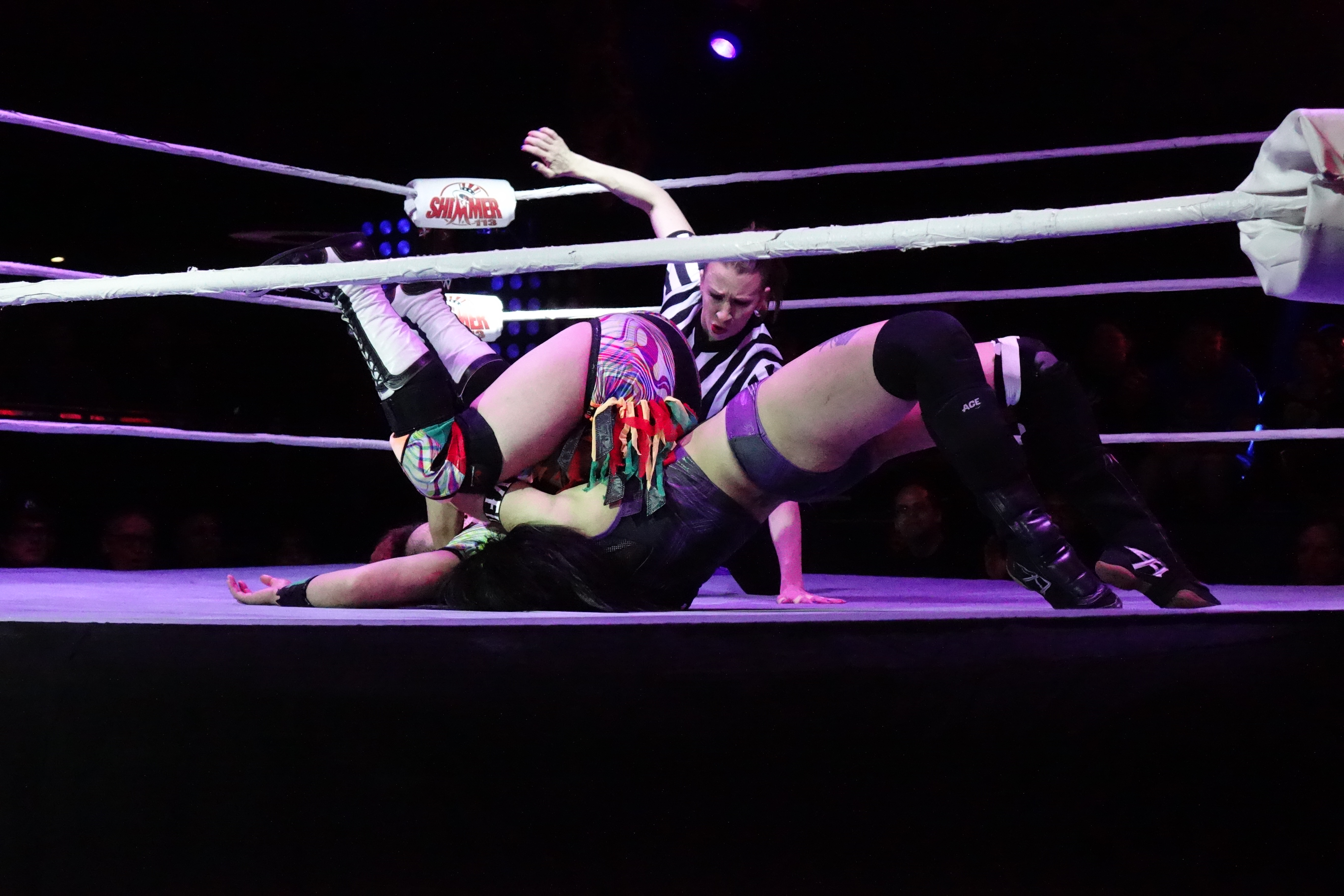
Matsumoto facing Nicole Savoy at a Shimmer event in April 2019

Matsumoto returned from her knee injury on April 12, 2015, at a Shimmer Women Athletes event. She returned early in order to take part in Tomoka Nakagawa's second to last match, where she, Nakagawa, Kellie Skater and Misaki Ohata were defeated by Aja Kong, Dynamite Kansai, Kyoko Kimura and Mayumi Ozaki. Matsumoto's official return match took place at her self produced event on June 28, where she was defeated by Arisa Nakajima. On December 6, Matsumoto won her first title since her return, when she, Evie and Kellie Skater captured the vacant Artist of Stardom Championship.

On February 28, 2016, Matsumoto, Evie and Skater lost the Artist of Stardom Championship to Io Shirai, Kairi Hojo and Mayu Iwatani in their third defense. On November 13, at Oz Academy's 20th anniversary event, Matsumoto defeated Sonoko Kato to win the Oz Academy Openweight Championship for the first time.

=== WWE (2018) ===
Matsumoto was announced to take part in the 2018 Mae Young Classic. She defeated Rachel Evers in the first round. In the second round, Matsumoto was eliminated by Toni Storm.

== Championships and accomplishments ==
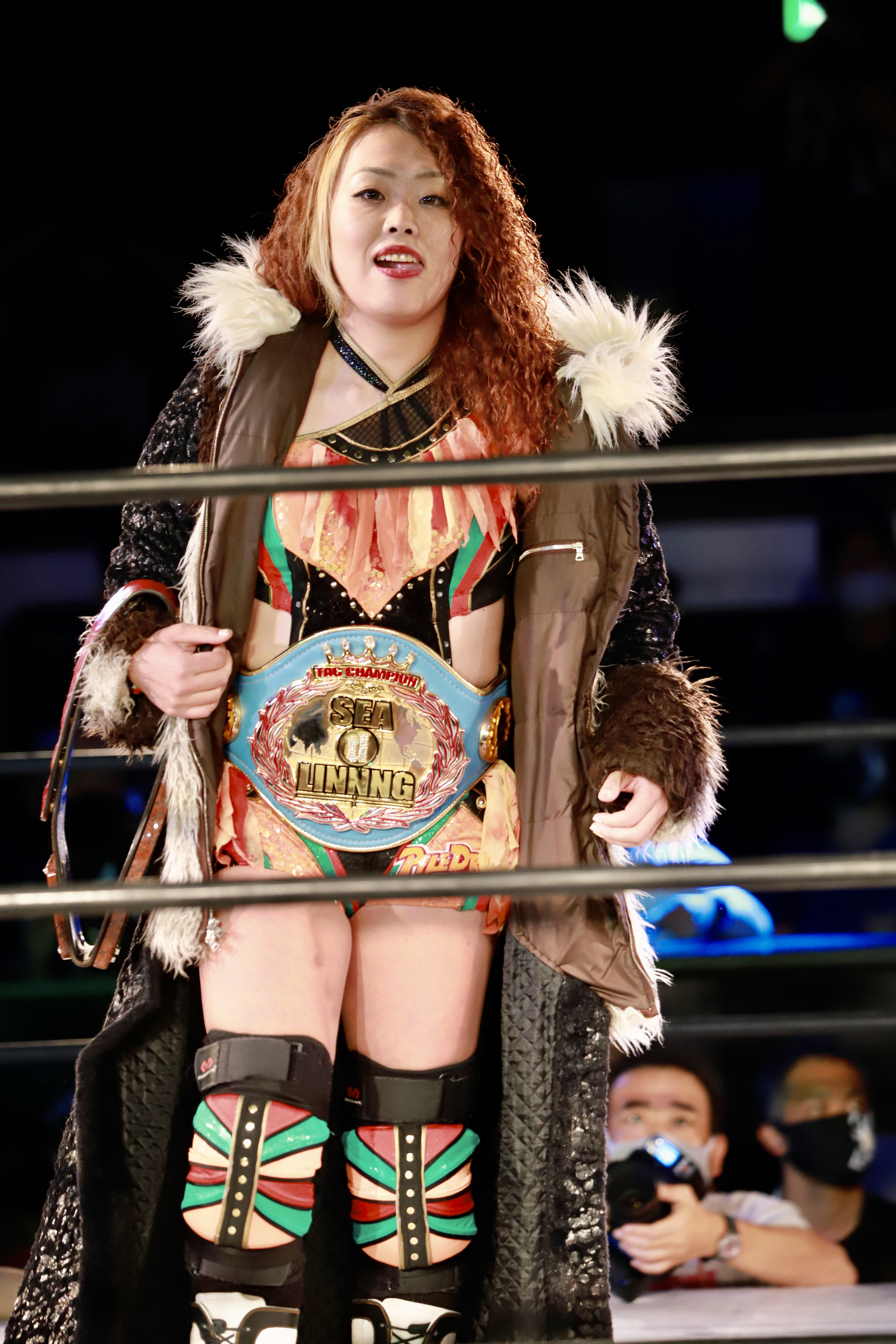
In Seadlinnng, Matsumoto is a former Beyond the Sea Tag Team Champion...

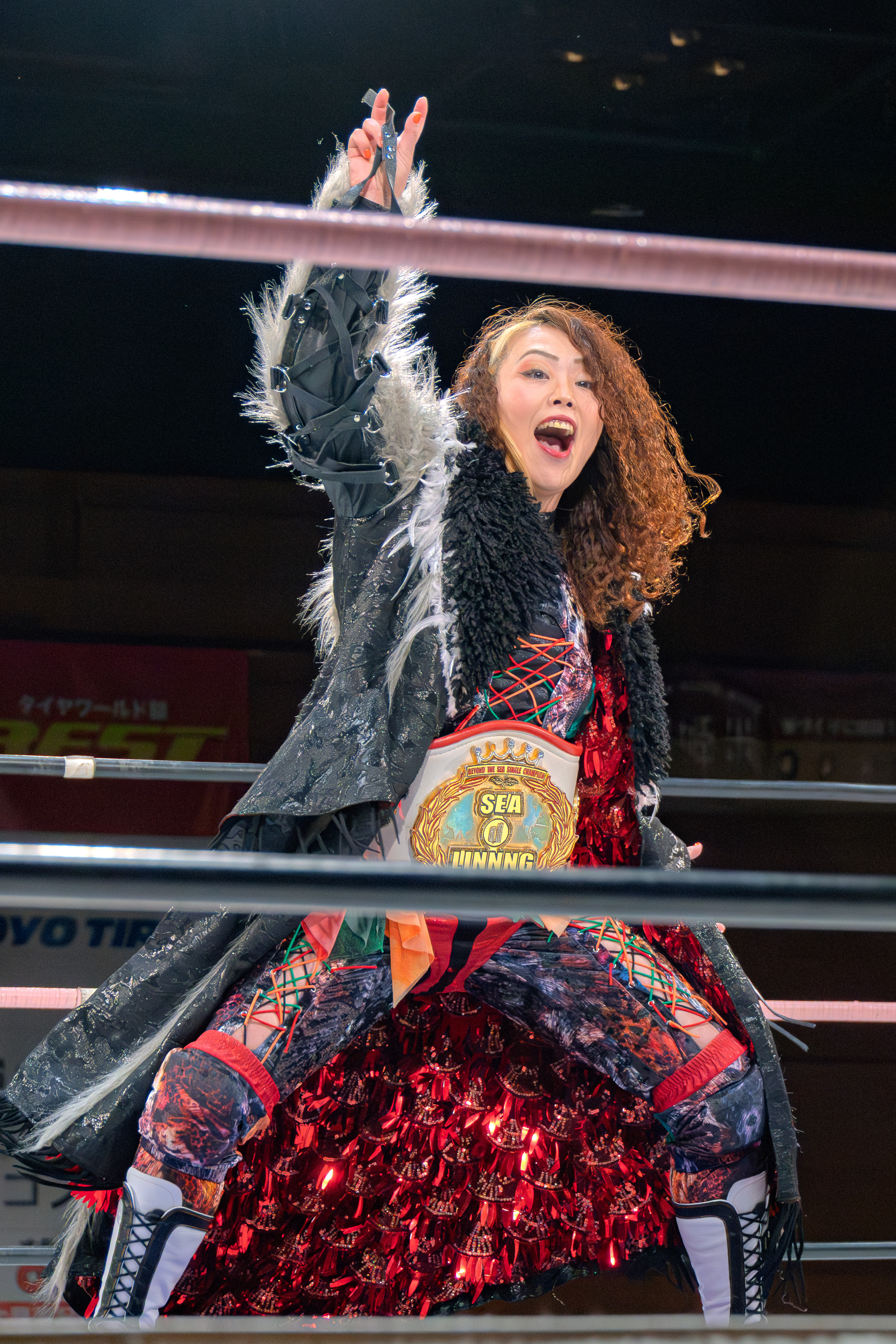
...and a Beyond the Sea Single Champion.

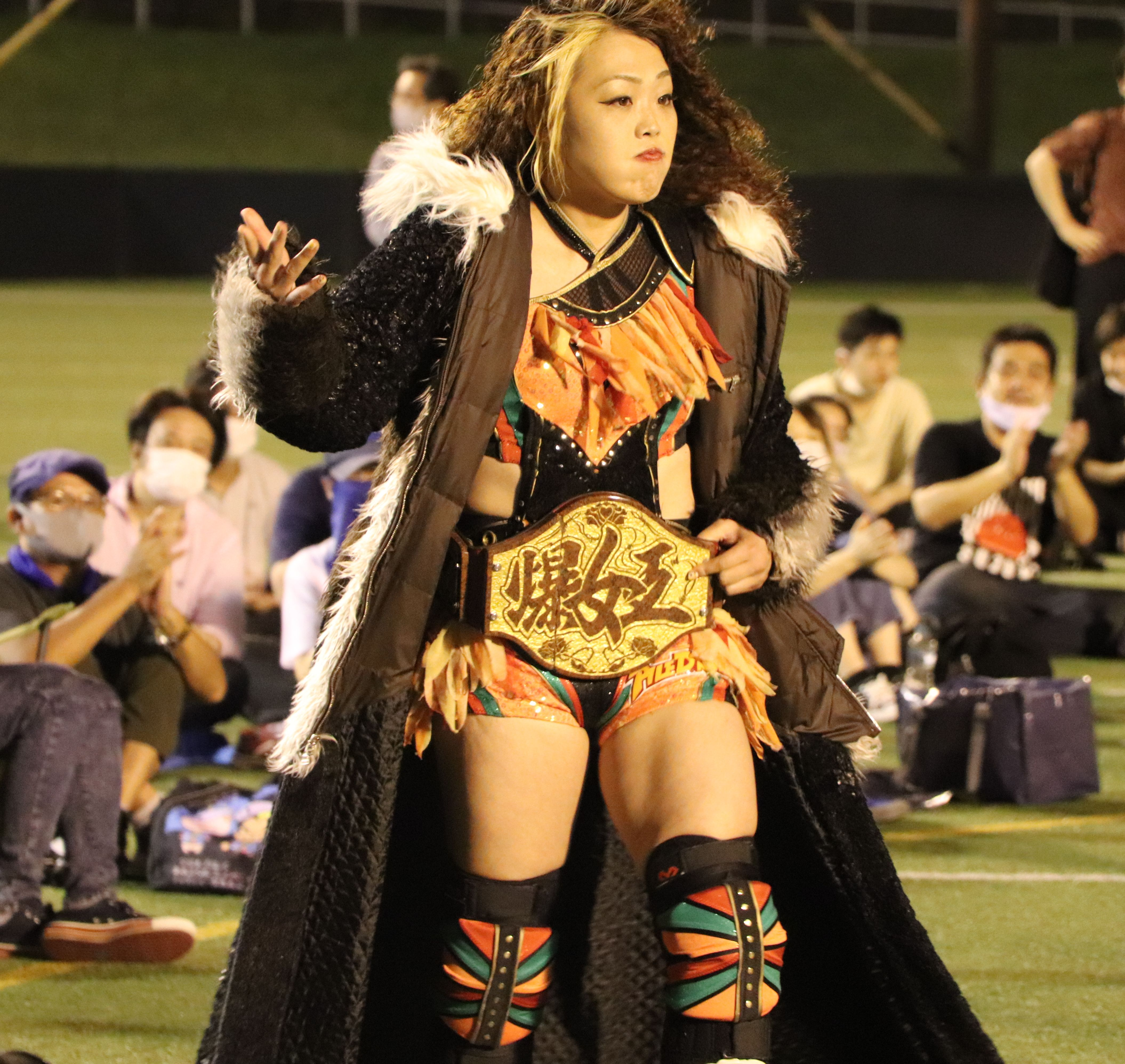
In Pro Wrestling Zero1, Matsumoto is a former Blast Queen Champion

- Dramatic Dream Team
  - Ironman Heavymetalweight Championship (1 time)
- Ice Ribbon
  - International Ribbon Tag Team Championship (2 times) – with Hamuko Hoshi (1) and Tsukasa Fujimoto (1)
- JWP Joshi Puroresu
  - JWP Junior Championship (1 time)
  - Princess of Pro-Wrestling Championship (1 time)
- NEO Japan Ladies Pro-Wrestling
  - NEO Tag Team Championship (1 time) – with Kyoko Inoue
  - NEO Stage (2008)
  - NEO Mid-Summer Tag Tournament VII (2008) – with Kyoko Inoue
- Oz Academy
  - Oz Academy Openweight Championship (2 times, current)
  - Oz Academy Tag Team Championship (7 times) – with Aja Kong (1), Kaori Yoneyama (1), Rina Yamashita (1) Tomoka Nakagawa (3), Zones (1)
  - Oz Academy Openweight Championship Next Challenger Determination Tournament (2012)
  - Best Wizard Award (6 times)
    - Best Bout Award (2015) with Arisa Nakajima and Hikaru Shida vs. Akino, Sonoko Kato and Tsubasa Kuragaki on August 23
    - Best Bout Award (2016) vs. Sonoko Kato on November 13
    - Best Bout Award (2019) vs. Mayumi Ozaki in a barbed wire current blast bat death match on August 25
    - Best Tag Team Match Award (2011) with Tomoka Nakagawa vs. Chikayo Nagashima and Sonoko Kato on January 9
    - MVP Award (2016)
    - Special Award (2011)
- Pro Wrestling Illustrated
  - Ranked No. 25 of the top 50 female singles wrestlers in the PWI Female 50 in 2017
- Seadlinnng
  - Beyond the Sea Single Championship (2 times)
  - Beyond the Sea Single Championship Tournament (2022)
  - Beyond the Sea Tag Team Championship (1 time) – with Yoshiko
- Sendai Girls' Pro Wrestling
  - Jaja Uma (2008)
  - Sendai Girls World Championship (1 time)
  - Sendai Girls Tag Team Championship (3 times) – with Dash Chisako
- Shimmer Women Athletes
  - Shimmer Tag Team Championship (1 time) – with Misaki Ohata
- Super Fireworks Pro Wrestling/Pro Wrestling Zero1
  - Blast Queen Championship (2 times)
- World Wonder Ring Stardom
  - Artist of Stardom Championship (3 times) – with Mayu Iwatani and Miho Wakizawa (1), Evie and Kellie Skater (1), and Jungle Kyona and Kaori Yoneyama (1)
  - Goddesses of Stardom Championship (1 time) – with Jungle Kyona
