= Yoshiko (wrestler) =

Japanese professional wrestler

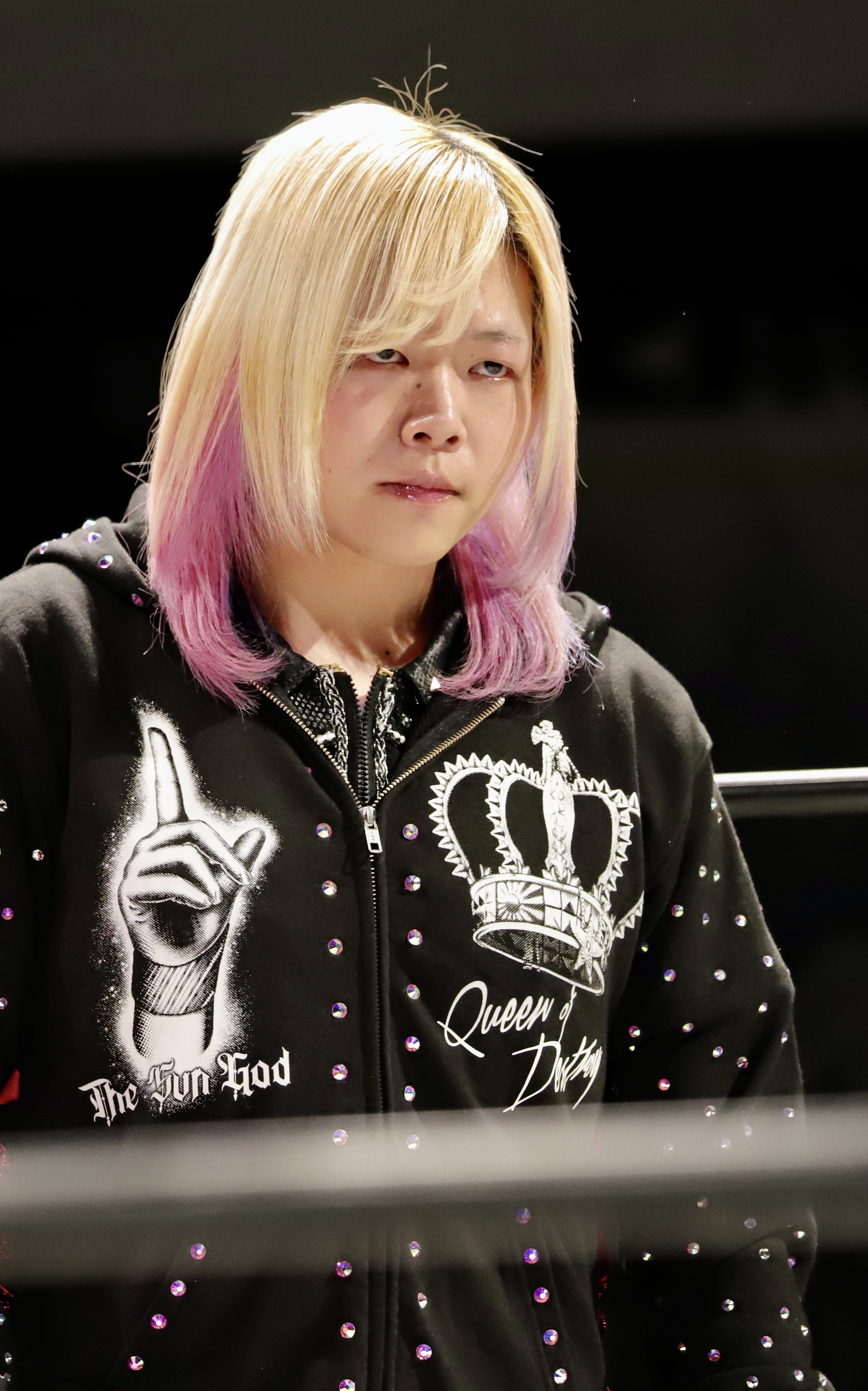
- Yoshiko in January 2021

Personal information
- Born: Yoshiko Hirano (平野 芳子, Hirano Yoshiko); July 26, 1993 (age 33) Katsushika, Tokyo

Professional wrestling career
- Ring name(s): Kintora; World of Tiger; Yoshiko; Yoshikong
- Billed height: 1.62 m (5 ft 4 in)
- Billed weight: 75 kg (165 lb)
- Trained by: Fuka; Nanae Takahashi; Natsuki☆Taiyo; Yuu Yamagata
- Debut: January 23, 2011

Yoshiko Hirano (平野 芳子, Hirano Yoshiko; born July 26, 1993), known mononymously as Yoshiko (世志琥, Yoshiko; originally 世IV虎), is a Japanese professional wrestler. She is working for Seadlinnng.

She debuted with the World Wonder Ring Stardom promotion in January 2011, forming a successful partnership with Natsuki☆Taiyo, with the two winning the Goddesses of Stardom Championship and the 2012 Goddesses of Stardom Tag League. Following Taiyo's retirement, Yoshiko won Stardom's top title, the World of Stardom Championship, in August 2014. Yoshiko's reign ended in controversy in February 2015, when she went off script during a match with Act Yasukawa, legitimately beating and injuring her. Afterwards, Yoshiko was stripped of the World of Stardom Championship, suspended and eventually announced her retirement. However, she soon returned to professional wrestling, and in February 2016, began working for Nanae Takahashi's new promotion Seadlinnng. She later made a special appearance at All Star Dream Cinderella, in a match against Mayu Iwatani.

== Professional wrestling career ==
=== World Wonder Ring Stardom (2010–2015) ===
Hirano was presented as part of World Wonder Ring Stardom's roster at the promotion's first press conference on September 7, 2010. She was trained by Fuka Kakimoto alongside the likes of Eri Susa, Mayu Iwatani, Yoko Bito and Yuzuki Aikawa as part of Stardom's first class of trainees. Hirano was given the ring name Yoshiko, spelled with the Roman numeral for the number four, IV, read as "shi". She was given a villainous character, inspired by the yankii culture. Her debut match took place at Stardom's inaugural event on January 23, 2011, where she was defeated by Yoko Bito. Afterwards, Yoshiko formed a partnership with veteran wrestler Natsuki☆Taiyo. The team was named "Kawasaki Katsushika Saikyou Densetsu" ("Kawasaki [Taiyo's birthplace] Katsushika [Yoshiko's birthplace] Strongest Legend"). On July 24, Yoshiko was part of a match to determine the inaugural Wonder of Stardom Champion, but was defeated by Yuzuki Aikawa. On November 27, Yoshiko and Taiyo were defeated by Aikawa and Bito in the finals of the 2011 Goddesses of Stardom Tag League, which was used to determine the inaugural Goddesses of Stardom Champions. Yoshiko ended the year by winning a four-woman tournament contested between the class one trainees to become the 2011 Rookie of Stardom.

Yoshiko and Taiyo eventually won the Goddesses of Stardom Championship on November 25, 2012, by defeating Kairi Hojo and Natsumi Showzuki in the finals of the 2012 Goddesses of Stardom Tag League. Meanwhile, Kawasaki Katsushika Saikyou Densetsu expanded into "Kawasaki Katsushika Saikyou Densetsu Plus One" with the additions of Act Yasukawa, Kyoko Kimura and Saki Kashima. After three successful title defenses, Yoshiko and Taiyo lost the Goddesses of Stardom Championship to former stablemate Kyoko Kimura and Hailey Hatred on March 17. On April 29, Yoshiko main evented Stardom's Ryōgoku Cinderella event, defeating Yuzuki Aikawa in her retirement match. On October 17, Yoshiko took part in a sixteen-woman elimination tag team match, promoted by Sendai Girls' Pro Wrestling. The match pitted a team of younger wrestlers against a team of industry veterans. Yoshiko won the match for the younger generation by scoring the final elimination over Sendai Girls' founder Meiko Satomura. Back in Stardom, Yoshiko continued teaming with Taiyo until her retirement in June 2014. On the road to her retirement, Taiyo was defeated by Yoshiko on March 16 in what was billed as the final match between the teacher and student pairing.

After going solo, Yoshiko won Stardom's top title, the World of Stardom Championship, by defeating Io Shirai on August 10, 2014. Afterwards, Yoshiko came together with Shirai, Mayu Iwatani and Reo Hazuki to form a group of wrestlers born in the Heisei period, opposing a team of Stardom's older wrestlers, led by Nanae Takahashi. On January 18, 2015, Yoshiko successfully defended the World of Stardom Championship against Takahashi.

==== Incident with Act Yasukawa ====
On February 22, 2015, Yoshiko faced former stablemate Act Yasukawa in her third defense of the World of Stardom Championship. The match saw Yoshiko go off script, legitimately beating Yasukawa until veteran wrestler Kyoko Kimura threw in a towel to end the match after less than eight minutes. Afterwards, Yasukawa was diagnosed with fractured cheek, nasal and orbital bones, which required surgery. Yasukawa has had issues with her eyes before the incident, having undergone a cataract surgery the previous year. On February 25, Stardom held a press conference, during which Yoshiko publicly apologized for the incident, after which she was stripped of the World of Stardom Championship and suspended indefinitely. The incident received mainstream attention in Japan and became known as Seisan Matchi (凄惨マッチ; "Ghastly Match"). The incident also strained the relationship between Stardom's management and top wrestler Nanae Takahashi, leading to Takahashi quitting the promotion in May. On May 31, Stardom announced that Yoshiko had decided to retire from professional wrestling. Her retirement ceremony took place on June 14, however, during the closing ten-bell salute meant to signal the end of her career, Yoshiko walked out on the ceremony, leading to questions over whether she was truly retired. Yasukawa eventually returned to the ring on September 23, 2015, but retired the following December due to the damage inflicted on her eye in the incident with Yoshiko.

=== Seadlinnng (2016–present) ===
Yoshiko returned to professional wrestling on January 11, 2016, during an event held by Nanae Takahashi's new Seadlinnng promotion. She appeared ringside, supporting Takahashi during her main event match against Meiko Satomura. On February 11, Seadlinnng officially announced that Yoshiko (now with a revised ring name) had joined the promotion and would be returning to wrestling full-time. Her return match took place on March 7 and saw her defeat Takahashi. Afterwards, Yoshiko also began making appearances outside of Seadlinnng, working for Sendai Girls' Pro Wrestling on April 8, World Woman Pro-Wrestling Diana on May 5, and participating in Pro Wrestling Wave's 2016 Catch the Wave tournament between April 10 and June 5, making it to the semifinals, before losing to eventual tournament winner Ryo Mizunami. On August 24, 2017, Yoshiko defeated Takumi Iroha in the finals to win the Ultra U-7 Tournament. On October 29, Yoshiko defeated Hiroyo Matsumoto to win the Oz Academy promotion's top title, the Oz Academy Openweight Championship. On July 25, 2018, Yoshiko and Rina Yamashita became the first Seadlinnng Beyond the Sea Tag Team Champions, defeating Nanae Takahashi and Tsukasa Fujimoto. Yoshiko and Rina Yamashita, in the Oz Academy promotion, defeated Maya Yukihi and Mayumi Ozaki to win the Oz Academy Tag Team Championship on September 17, the match was also for the Beyond the Sea Tag Team Championship.

=== Return to Stardom (2020–present) ===
After five and a half years since leaving Stardom, Yoshiko alongside Nanae Takahashi, made their surprise return where they confronted Mayu Iwatani, Momo Watanabe, Starlight Kid and Saya Iida. Yoshiko had her return match against Iwatani at Stardom's 10 Year Anniversary All Star Dream Cinderella show.

== Mixed martial arts career ==
Yoshiko Hirano
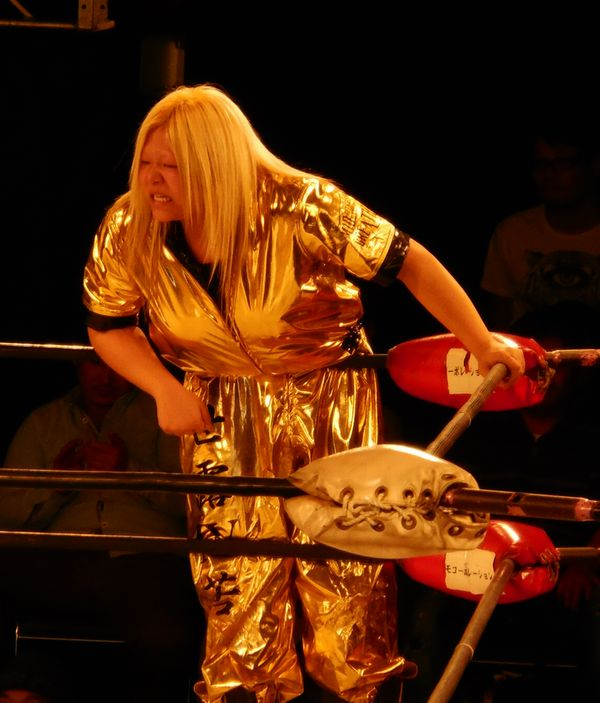
- Height: 160 cm (5 ft 3 in)
- Weight: 77.85 kg (172 lb; 12 st 4 lb)
- Division: Middleweight

Mixed martial arts record
- Total: 3
- Wins: 2
- By knockout: 1
- By submission: 1
- Losses: 1
- By decision: 1

Other information
- Mixed martial arts record from Sherdog
- Last updated on: December 24, 2017

On January 23, 2017, Yoshiko announced she would be making her mixed martial arts (MMA) debut for Road Fighting Championship (Road FC) on February 11 in South Korea. Road FC used the incident with Yasukawa to promote the debut, dubbing Yoshiko the "face-crusher". She had been training MMA since the autumn of 2016 at Kiyoshi Tamura's U-File Camp and underwent further training under Hidetaka Monma at his Brightness dojo after the fight was announced. In her debut fight, Yoshiko defeated local fighter Chun Sun-Yoo by knockout in the first round. Yoshiko and Chun Sun-Yoo had a rematch on June 10, 2017, with Yoshiko this time winning via submission with a Kimura in the first round. Yoshiko suffered her first loss when she was defeated by Young Ji Kim via unanimous decision on December 23, 2017. That same day, Yoshiko was named Road FC's Female Rookie of the Year.

== Championships and accomplishments ==
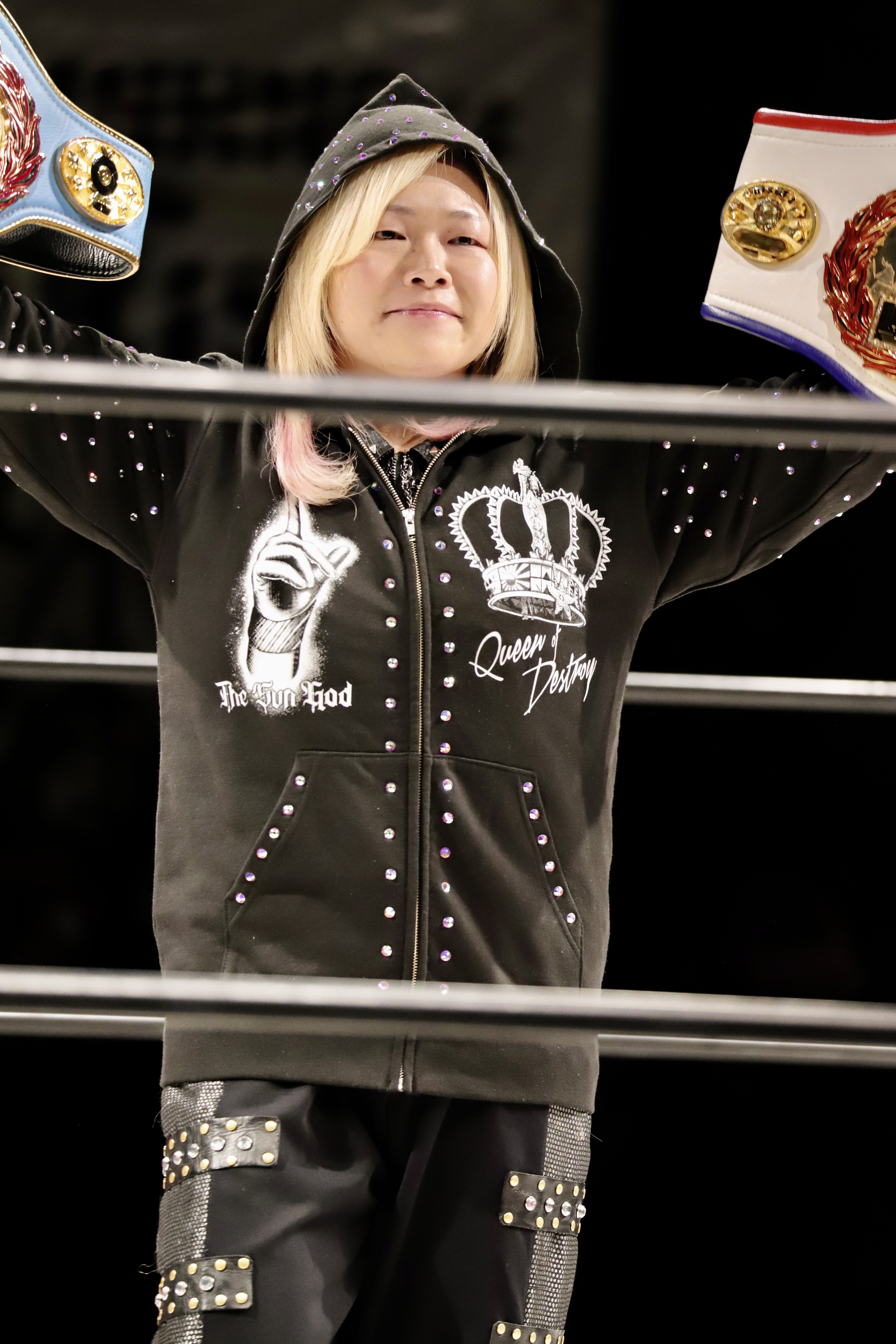
In Seadlinnng, Yoshiko is a one-time Beyond the Sea Single Champion and a three-time Beyond the Sea Tag Team Champion

Mixed martial arts

- Road Fighting Championship
  - Female Rookie of the Year (2017)

Professional wrestling

- Oz Academy
  - Oz Academy Openweight Championship (1 time)
  - Oz Academy Tag Team Championship (1 time) – with Rina Yamashita
  - Best Wiazrd Award (1 time)
    - MVP Award (2017)
- Pro Wrestling Zero1
  - Blast Queen Championship (1 time)
- Seadlinnng
  - Beyond the Sea Single Championship (1 time)
  - Beyond the Sea Tag Team Championship (3 times) – with Hiroyo Matsumoto (1), Rina Yamashita (1) and Sareee (1)
  - Ultra U-7 Tournament (2017)
- World Wonder Ring Stardom
  - Goddesses of Stardom Championship (1 time) – with Natsuki☆Taiyo
  - World of Stardom Championship (1 time)
  - Goddesses of Stardom Tag League (2012) – with Natsuki☆Taiyo
  - Stardom Rookie of the Year (2011)
  - 5★Star GP Award (2 time)
    - 5★Star GP Fighting Spirit Award (2012)
    - 5★Star GP Finalist Award (2014)
  - Stardom Year-End Award (4 times)
    - Best Match Award (2013) vs. Yuzuki Aikawa on April 29
    - Best Tag Team Award (2012) with Natsuki☆Taiyo
    - Fighting Spirit Award (2011)
    - Outstanding Performance Award (2014)

== Mixed martial arts record ==
Professional record breakdown
3 matches	2 wins	1 loss
By knockout	1	0
By submission	1	0
By decision	0	1

Res.	Record	Opponent	Method	Event	Date	Round	Time	Location	Notes
Loss	2–1	Young Ji Kim	Decision (unanimous)	Road FC 045	December 23, 2017	2	5:00	Seoul, South Korea	Openweight match
Win	2–0	Sun Yoo Chun	Submission (keylock)	Road FC 039	June 10, 2017	1	4:49	Seoul, South Korea	Openweight match
Win	1–0	Sun Yoo Chun	KO (punch)	Road FC 036	February 11, 2017	1	2:01	Seoul, South Korea	Openweight match
