= Yumi Ohka =

Japanese professional wrestler

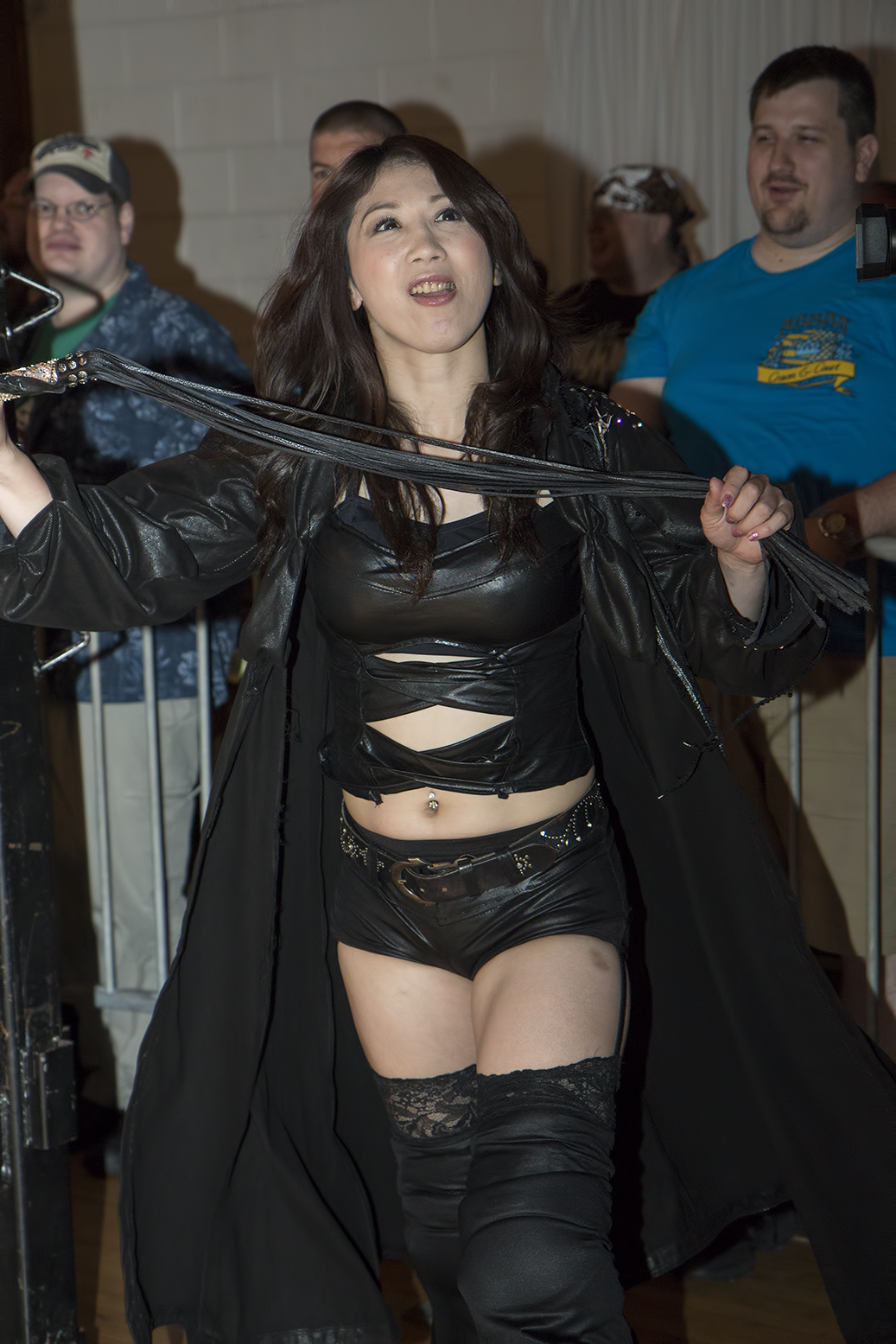
- Ohka in 2016

Personal information
- Born: Yumiko Abe; April 4, 1979 (age 47) Koga, Ibaraki

Professional wrestling career
- Ring name(s): Sakura Candle; Sandaime Misaki Glico; Yumi Ohka
- Billed height: 1.68 m (5 ft 6 in)
- Billed weight: 59 kg (130 lb)
- Trained by: Jaguar Yokota; Toshie Uematsu
- Debut: August 19, 2001

Yumiko Abe (阿部 由美子, Abe Yumiko; born April 4, 1979), better known by her ring name Yumi Ohka (桜花 由美, Ōka Yumi), is a Japanese professional wrestler. Originally trained by the now defunct JDStar promotion, Ohka now works for Oz Academy and Pro Wrestling Wave. She is a former two-time Wave Single Champion, while also being a former Oz Academy Tag Team Champion and Wave Tag Team Champion. She is the managing director of Zabun Co., Ltd., which owns Pro Wrestling Wave.

== Professional wrestling career ==
=== JDStar (2001–2007) ===
After originally working as a voice actress, Abe, with a sports background in judo, transitioned to professional wrestling, making her debut under the ring name Yumi Ohka on August 19, 2001, in a tag team match, where she teamed with Chiaki Kashiwada against Keiko Furuta and Teruko Kagawa. Afterwards, Ohka entered the training dojo of the JDStar promotion, where she was trained by Jaguar Yokota as part of the "Athtress" program, which aimed at building physically attractive women into not only professional wrestlers, but also mainstream celebrities. She graduated from the program on March 23, 2003. Ohka's first wrestling character saw her proclaim herself as an idol, which included her singing her own entrance themes and occasionally holding performances in the middle of JDStar events. After her graduation, Ohka formed a regular tag team with fellow athtress The Bloody. On June 22, the two made it to the finals of a tournament for the vacant TWF World Tag Team Championship, before being defeated by Maru and Megumi Yabushita. Ohka would win her first title on August 10, when she and The Bloody defeated Maru and Yabushita in a rematch for the TWF World Tag Team Championship. They would lose the title to Crow and Fang on November 24 in a barbed wire steel cage death match, a match type chosen by the challengers to gain an advantage over the champions. Ohka and The Bloody would regain the title on January 18, 2004, but were stripped three months later, when The Bloody left JDStar. Starting her singles career, Ohka main evented JDStar's event on June 6, losing to Asami. On August 8, Ohka made a guest appearance for the Oz Academy promotion, entering the Iron Woman Singles and Tag Team Tournaments, being eliminated from both in the first round; by Aja Kong in the singles tournament and by Amazing Kong and Chikayo Nagashima in the tag team tournament, where she teamed with Michiko Omukai. On June 26, 2005, Ohka achieved her first major singles accomplishment, when she defeated Kei Akiyama to win JDStar's 2005 Jupiter League. With the win, Ohka solidified her spot as the "ace" of JDStar. Three days later, Ohka defeated Toshie Uematsu to win Dramatic Dream Team's (DDT) Ironman Heavymetalweight Championship. She would lose the title to Keiko Saito later that same day.

On September 23, 2005, Ohka wrestled at an Ibuki event, where she and Kyoko Kimura faced Atsuko Emoto and Ayumi Kurihara in a Two Out of Three Falls match, during which she broke the anterior cruciate ligament in her left knee. Ohka underwent an immediate surgery on her meniscus and on February 16, 2006, also underwent a surgery to repair the ACL. The injury would leave her sidelined for almost two years. Despite her inactivity from in-ring competition, Ohka kept making semi-regular appearances for JDStar, including producing her fifth anniversary event on August 20, 2006. During early 2007, JDStar announced that it was going out of business, which led to Ohka hurrying back to make one final appearance for the promotion. On July 16 at JDStar's final ever event, Ohka wrestled rookie Misaki Ohata to a five-minute time limit draw in what was billed as a "prologue" to her real return match.

=== Pro Wrestling Wave (2007–present) ===
After the closure of JDStar, Ohka, along with fellow JDStar alum Gami and booker Tatsuya Takeshi, formed the Pro Wrestling Wave promotion, which held its first event on August 26, 2007. The first show was main evented by Ohka's official return match from her ACL injury, a tag team match, where she and Michiko Omukai were defeated by Ran Yu-Yu and Toshie Uematsu. During the following month, Ohka competed in three consecutive main event singles matches, losing them all, against Misae Genki, Nanae Takahashi, and Toshie Uematsu. Ohka's main event losing streak ended on September 23, when she defeated thirteen other women in a battle royal to win the Daily Sports Journal Cup. On November 25, Ohka teamed with Michiko Omukai to end Ran Yu-Yu's and Toshie Uematsu's undefeated streak. On January 27, 2008, Ohka took part in a high-profile match, which saw freelancer Manami Toyota make a special appearance and defeat her in a singles match. On August 16 at Wave's first anniversary event, Ohka wrestled her seventh anniversary match, in which she was defeated by Hikaru. Ohka and Toyota had a rematch on March 15, 2009, where Toyota was again victorious.

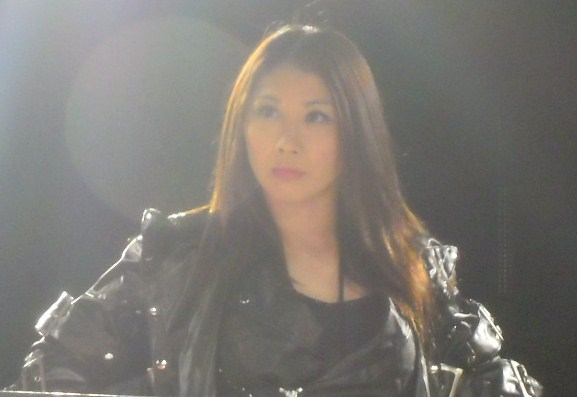
Ohka in July 2010

On May 27, Ohka entered the first ever Catch the Wave tournament, where she competed in the "Technical" block. After two wins and one loss, Ohka advanced to the semifinals on August 11, where she defeated Kana. Later that same day, Ohka defeated Ayumi Kurihara to win the 2009 Catch the Wave. During the tournament, Abe also debuted a new masked alter ego, Sakura Candle, a comedy character supposedly made of wax. Abe continues to make sporadic appearances under the character. On August 23 at Wave's second anniversary event, Ohka was defeated in the main event by Aja Kong. On February 13, 2010, Ohka wrestled in Wave's 100th match, where she and Kana defeated Hiroyo Matsumoto and Shuu Shibutani. On February 24, Ohka defeated Oz Academy representative Mayumi Ozaki in a high-profile main event. On May 30, Ohka entered the 2010 Catch the Wave, looking to successfully defend her crown. After two wins, one draw and one loss, Ohka was entered into a decision match on August 10, where she defeated Kana to advance to the semifinals. However, the following day, Ohka was defeated in her semifinal match by Gami. On October 3, Pro Wrestling Wave took a major step up in the world of joshi puroresu, when the promotion held its first event in Tokyo's Korakuen Hall. The main event of the evening saw Ohka, Ayumi Kurihara and Sawako Shimono wrestle Ayako Hamada, Meiko Satomura and Yoshiko Tamura to a thirty-minute time limit draw.

Dissatisfied (in storyline) with her position in Wave, Ohka turned heel on October 24 and formed a tag team with Bambi. On December 5, Ohka unsuccessfully challenged NEO Japan Ladies Pro Wrestling representative Yoshiko Tamura for the NEO Single and NWA Women's Pacific Championships. On December 19, longtime babyface Misaki Ohata also turned heel and joined Ohka and Bambi. In early 2011, Cherry and Hiren joined Ohka, Bambi and Ohata to form the stable named Black Dahlia, after the 1947 murder case. In the new formation, Ohka, the original leader, took a backseat to Ohata, who became the de facto leader of the group. As a member of Black Dahlia, Ohka was able to win her first Wave of Waves match on February 13, when she defeated Gami, who had won the three previous Wave of Waves matches between the two founders of the promotion. During the next two months, Ohka tied the score in Wave of Waves matches by defeating Gami first on March 20 and then on April 10. On May 2, Ohka entered the 2011 Catch the Wave. After two wins and two losses, which included a win over Misaki Ohata, Ohka failed to make it to the semifinals of the tournament for the first time. On August 28, Wave held its fourth-anniversary event, where Ohka wrestled her tenth-anniversary match, where she, Ohata and Ayako Hamada defeated Aja Kong, Gami and Tomoka Nakagawa, with Ohka pinning Kong for the win. The following month, Wave held the Dual Shock Wave 2011 tournament to crown the first ever Wave Tag Team Champions. Ohka entered the tournament with Black Dahlia's newest member Ayako Hamada, with the forming the tag team billed as "Negras Dahlia". After defeating Kagetsu and Sawako Shimono in their first round match, Ohka and Hamada were eliminated from the tournament in the second round by Gami and Tomoka Nakagawa.

On October 27, Ohka represented Wave in Sendai Girls' Pro Wrestling's Joshi Puroresu Dantai Taikou Flash Tournament, a single-elimination tournament, where different joshi promotions battled each other. Team Wave, which also included Gami, Moeka Haruhi, Shuu Shibutani and Toshie Uematsu, was eliminated in their first round match by Team JWP of Command Bolshoi, Hanako Nakamori, Kaori Yoneyama, Kayoko Haruyama and Leon. On April 30, 2012, Ohka entered the 2012 Catch the Wave, wrestling in the Black Dahlia round-robin block. After a loss to Cherry, wins over Hanako Nakamori, and Misaki Ohata, and a draw against Tsukasa Fujimoto, Ohka finished tied at the top of the block. On July 1, Ohka defeated Fujimoto in a tiebreaker match to advance to the semifinals of the tournament. On July 16, Ohka was eliminated from the tournament in the semifinals by Ayumi Kurihara, who went on to win the entire tournament. On July 27, Black Dahlia and rival group White Tails wrestled to a draw in a five-on-five gauntlet match, which ended with Ohka wrestling Mika Iida to a ten-minute time limit draw. Following the match, Black Dahlia leader Misaki Ohata blamed the result on Ohka, noting that she, as well as Ayako Hamada, Bambi and Cherry, the other members of the stable in the match, were all in their thirties. Ohata then recruited the 24-year-old Mio Shirai to the stable to bring down the average age of the group. The draw between Black Dahlia and White Tails led to the two groups agreeing that the stable, which would manage to draw fewer people to their self-produced Wave event, which would take place August 7 and 8, would disband. The Black Dahlia event was headlined by an eight-woman tag team match between the stable's two generations. In the match, Ohka, Ayako Hamada, Bambi and Cherry were defeated by Ohata, Apple Miyuki, Hanako Nakamori and Mio Shirai, with Ohata pinning Ohka for the win after hitting her with the stable's signature whip. White Tails ended up winning the battle for attendance 201–191, forcing Black Dahlia to disband.

Ohka and Misaki Ohata faced off on August 26 at Wave's fifth-anniversary event in a singles match, which was won by Ohata. On September 23, Ohka made her debut for Ice Ribbon at Ribbon no Kishitachi 2012, where she represented Pro Wrestling Wave in a six-woman tag team Two Out of Three Falls Wave vs. Ice Ribbon match, where she, Gami and Ryo Mizunami defeated Hamuko Hoshi, Maki Narumiya and Tsukasa Fujimoto, with Ohka pinning Narumiya for the win. Two days later, Ohka entered the 2012 Dual Shock Wave tournament with Ice Ribbon's Hikaru Shida, whom she chose as her partner after Misaki Ohata had picked Shida's regular tag team partner Tsukasa Fujimoto as her own partner. In their opening round-robin match of the tournament, Ohka and Shida, billed together as Shidarezakura were defeated by Shuu Shibutani and Syuri. After wins over Kurigohan (Ayumi Kurihara and Mika Iida) and 1st Impact (Makoto and Moeka Haruhi), Shidarezakura finished their round-robin block with four points, tied at the top with Shuu Shibutani and Syuri, forcing a decision match between the two teams. On November 16, Ohka and Shida were eliminated from the Dual Shock Wave tournament, after suffering their second loss against Shuu Shibutani and Syuri in a match to determine the winner of their round-robin block. On November 27, Ohka was defeated in a singles match by Kana, who then announced that as a result of her loss, Ohka had lost the right to call herself the "ace" of Wave. On January 4, 2013, Ohka and Hikaru Shida failed to capture the Wave Tag Team Championship from Misaki Ohata and Tsukasa Fujimoto in a title match, which ended in a thirty-minute time limit draw.

On February 17, Ohka, as the 2009 Catch the Wave winner, was granted entrance into a tournament to determine the inaugural Wave Single Champion and defeated rival Misaki Ohata in her semifinal match. On March 17, Ohka defeated Kana in the finals to win the tournament and become the inaugural Wave Single Champion. Ohka made her first successful title defense on April 21 against Yuu Yamagata. On July 15, Ohka became a double champion in Wave, when she and Hikaru Shida defeated Triple Tails.S (Kana and Mio Shirai) for the Wave Tag Team Championship. However, after a reign of only a month, Shidarezakura lost the Wave Tag Team Championship to Yoko Hatanaka (Gami and Tomoka Nakagawa) in their first defense on August 15. On August 25, Ohka made her second successful defense of the Wave Single Championship against rival and winner of the 2013 Catch the Wave, Misaki Ohata. From September 1 to October 6, Ohka took part in the 2013 Dual Shock Wave tournament, where she teamed with Kana under the team name Giann's. The team made it all the way to the finals of the tournament, before losing to Las Aventureras (Ayako Hamada and Yuu Yamagata) in a three-way match, which also included Muscle Venus (Hikaru Shida and Tsukasa Fujimoto). On October 30, Ohka made her third successful defense of the Wave Single Championship against Tomoka Nakagawa, avenging a loss suffered during the 2013 Dual Shock Wave. On November 20, Ohka combined her two tag teams with Hikaru Shida and Kana to form a trio named Shidare Giann's for a 6-Person Tag Tournament. In their first round Two Out of Three Falls match, the three defeated Urayama Arrows (Natsuki Urabe, Rina Yamashita and Yako Fujigasaki). On November 27, Shidare Giann's was eliminated from the tournament in a semifinal submission match by Revolucion Yoko Hatanaka (Gami, Kyoko Kimura and Tomoka Nakagawa). On December 15, Ohka made her fourth successful defense of the Wave Single Championship against Shuu Shibutani. Following Gami's retirement from professional wrestling at the end of 2013, Ohka became the new official representative of Wave. Ohka made her fifth successful defense of the Wave Single Championship on January 26, 2014, when she wrestled Misaki Ohata to a thirty-minute time limit draw. On March 2, Ohka made her sixth successful defense against JWP representative Kayoko Haruyama as part of a storyline rivalry between the two promotions. Ohka's seventh successful title defense took place on April 20, when she defeated Hikaru Shida. From May 5 to June 22, Ohka took part in the round-robin portion of the 2014 Catch the Wave tournament, winning her block with a record of three wins, two draws and one loss, suffered against Tsukasa Fujimoto. On July 27, Ohka was eliminated from the tournament in the semifinals by Misaki Ohata. On August 24, Ohka's seventeen-month reign as the Wave Single Champion came to an end, when she lost the title to the 2014 Catch the Wave winner Hikaru Shida in her eighth defense.

On September 23, Ohka entered the 2014 Dual Shock Wave, teaming with Ice Ribbon's Tsukasa Fujimoto, playing off the two's management roles in their respective home promotions. They were, however, eliminated from the tournament in the first round by Plus Minus 2014 (Mio Shirai and Misaki Ohata). On October 5, Ohka made a special appearance for All Japan Pro Wrestling, teaming with Shuu Shibutani in a tag team match, where they defeated Kana and Mika Iida. On July 20, 2015, Ohka became the first two-time winner of Catch the Wave by defeating Mika Iida in the finals of the 2015 version of the tournament. As a result, Ohka earned a shot at the Wave Single Championship, but was defeated by Ayako Hamada on August 9.

On January 28, 2017, Ohka and Yuki Miyazaki, billed collectively as "Over Sun", defeated Avid Rival (Misaki Ohata and Ryo Mizunami) to win the Wave Tag Team Championship. They lost the title to Cherry and Kaori Yoneyama in their fifth defense on July 2. On December 29, Ohka defeated Misaki Ohata to become the first two-time Wave Single Champion.

=== Oz Academy (2010–present) ===
After a 5 1/2-year absence, Ohka made her return to Oz Academy on February 21, 2010, when she began working regularly for the promotion. In her return match, Ohka was pinned by the promotion's owner, Mayumi Ozaki, in a tag team match, where she and Dynamite Kansai faced Ozaki and Takako Inoue. Afterwards, Ohka turned heel and joined Ozaki's Ozaki-gun, which, in addition to the two and Inoue, also included Hiren and non-wrestlers Mika Nishio and Police. Ozaki-gun was mainly involved in a feud with Aja Kong's Jungle Jack 21 stable. At the end of the year, Ohka won both the Special Award and Impact Award, the latter for the moment when she joined forces with Mayumi Ozaki, as voted by the promotion's fans. On February 19, 2011, Ohka and Hiren unsuccessfully challenged Chikayo Nagashima and Sonoko Kato for the Oz Academy Tag Team Championship. On September 23, Ayumi Kurihara, Chikayo Nagashima, Hiroyo Matsumoto, and Ran Yu-Yu joined Ozaki-gun, which was in the process of being renamed Seiki-gun, replacing the retiring Hiren and Inoue, who were kicked out of the group. On November 27, Ohka and Matsumoto defeated the Oz Academy Tag Team Champions, Carlos Amano and Manami Toyota, in a non-title match. On February 26, 2012, Ohka, Matsumoto, Nagashima, and Yu-Yu had a four-way match to determine the number one contender to their leader Mayumi Ozaki's Oz Academy Openweight Championship. Ohka was eliminated from the match by the eventual winner, Chikayo Nagashima. On February 10, 2013, Ohka and Mayumi Ozaki defeated Akino and Ayumi Kurihara to win the Oz Academy Tag Team Championship. They, however, lost the title just 28 days later in their first defense to the team of Hiroyo Matsumoto and Tomoka Nakagawa of Jungle Jack 21. Ohka attempted to recapture the title from Matsumoto and Nakagawa with new Seikigun partner Mio Shirai on September 15, but the two were unsuccessful. When Shirai was given the storyline booking rights for Oz Academy's March 2 event, she handed Ohka and Mayumi Ozaki a rematch for the Oz Academy Tag Team Championship. The two were, however, defeated in the title match by Matsumoto and Nakagawa. On December 13, 2015, Ohka received her first ever shot at the Oz Academy Openweight Championship but was defeated by the defending champion, Sonoko Kato.

=== North America (2011–present) ===
On October 1, 2011, Ohka made her American debut for the Shimmer Women Athletes promotion in Berwyn, Illinois, losing to Sara Del Rey as part of Volume 41. Later that same day on Volume 42, Ohka defeated Courtney Rush. The following day on Volumes 43 and 44, Ohka defeated Mia Yim and lost to Serena Deeb, respectively. During her week in North America, Ohka also made an appearance for nCw Femmes Fatales in Montreal, Quebec, Canada on October 8, losing to Cheerleader Melissa.

On October 27, 2012, Ohka returned to the United States and Shimmer Women Athletes, defeating Christina Von Eerie as part of Volume 49. Later that same night on Volume 50, Ohka was defeated by Kellie Skater. The following night on Volume 51, Ohka defeated Shimmer Tag Team Champion Nicole Matthews in a singles match. Later that same night on Volume 52, Ohka defeated fellow Wave worker Ryo Mizunami in her final match of the weekend.

Ohka made her third trip to Shimmer in April 2014, defeating Athena at the tapings of Volume 63 on April 12 and unsuccessfully challenging Cheerleader Melissa for the Shimmer Championship later that same night on Volume 64. The following day, Ohka defeated LuFisto on Volume 65 and Melanie Cruise on Volume 66.

Ohka returned to Shimmer on April 11, 2015, losing to Madison Eagles on Volume 72. The following day on Volume 74, Ohka defeated Nicole Savoy. Ohka returned to Shimmer on October 10, first defeating Makoto on Volume 76 and then losing to Jessicka Havok on Volume 77. The following day, Ohka formed a tag team with Cheerleader Melissa, with the two defeating Hiroyo Matsumoto and Makoto on Volume 78 and KC Spinelli and Xandra Bale on Volume 79. Ohka returned to Shimmer in June 2016. Ohka teamed up with Melanie Cruise throughout the run and on Volume 85, the two unsuccessfully challenged Evie and Heidi Lovelace for the Shimmer Tag Team Championship.

== Championships and accomplishments ==
- Dramatic Dream Team
  - Ironman Heavymetalweight Championship (1 time)
- JDStar
  - TWF World Tag Team Championship (2 times) – with The Bloody
  - Jupiter League (2005)
- Oz Academy
  - Oz Academy Tag Team Championship (1 time) – with Mayumi Ozaki
  - Best Wizard Award (3 times)
    - Best Bout Award (2021) vs. Maya Yukihi, Mayumi Ozaki and Saori Anou on August 18
    - Impact Award (2010) Ohka joins forces with Mayumi Ozaki
    - Special Award (2010)
- Pro Wrestling Wave
  - Wave Single Championship (2 times)
  - Wave Tag Team Championship (6 times) – with Hikaru Shida (1), Mio Momono (2), Yuki Miyazaki (1), Sakura Hirota (1) ans Saran (1)
  - Catch the Wave (2009, 2015)
  - Daily Sports Journal Cup (2007)
  - Obasan Next Tournament (2017)
  - Regina di Wave Tournament (2013)
  - Catch the Wave Award (3 times)
    - Best Bout Award (2011) vs. Ayumi Kurihara on May 29
    - Best Bout Award (2015) vs. Ryo Mizunami on June 10
    - Best Performance Award (2015) as part of the Wonderful World Fairy Family
- World Woman Pro-Wrestling Diana
  - WWWD Queen Elizabeth Championship (2 times, current)
  - WWWD Tag Team Championship (1 time) – with Sakura Hirota
