= Beyond the Sea Single Championship =

Professional wrestling women's championship

Details
- Promotion: Seadlinnng
- Date established: November 1, 2018
- Current champion: Ayame Sasamura
- Date won: April 17, 2026
Statistics
- First champion: Nanae Takahashi
- Most reigns: Arisa Nakajima (3 reigns)
- Longest reign: Sareee (511 days)
- Shortest reign: Makoto (66 days)
- Oldest champion: Nanae Takahashi (39 years, 313 days)
- Youngest champion: Asuka (22 years, 141 days)
- Heaviest champion: Takumi Iroha (159 lb (72 kg))
- Lightest champion: Arisa Nakajima (132 lb (60 kg))

The Beyond the Sea Single Championship (BEYOND THE SEA SINGLE 王座 or BEYOND THE SEAシングル王座, Biyondo za shī shinguru ōza) is a women's professional wrestling championship owned by the Seadlinnng promotion. The title, which is situated at the top of Seadlinnng's championship hierarchy, was introduced on October 3, 2018, and the inaugural champion was crowned on November 1, 2018, when Nanae Takahashi defeated Arisa Nakajima in the finals of an eight-woman tournament. The bottom part of the belt is blue as it resembles the ocean, while the upper part of the belt is red, which resembles the sun. The title was vacated once as a result of former champion Yoshiko taking time off to rehabilitate nagging injuries.

Like most professional wrestling championships, the title is won as a result of a scripted match. There have been a total of fourteen reigns shared among ten different wrestlers. The current champion is Ayame Sasamura who is in her first reign.

== Title history ==
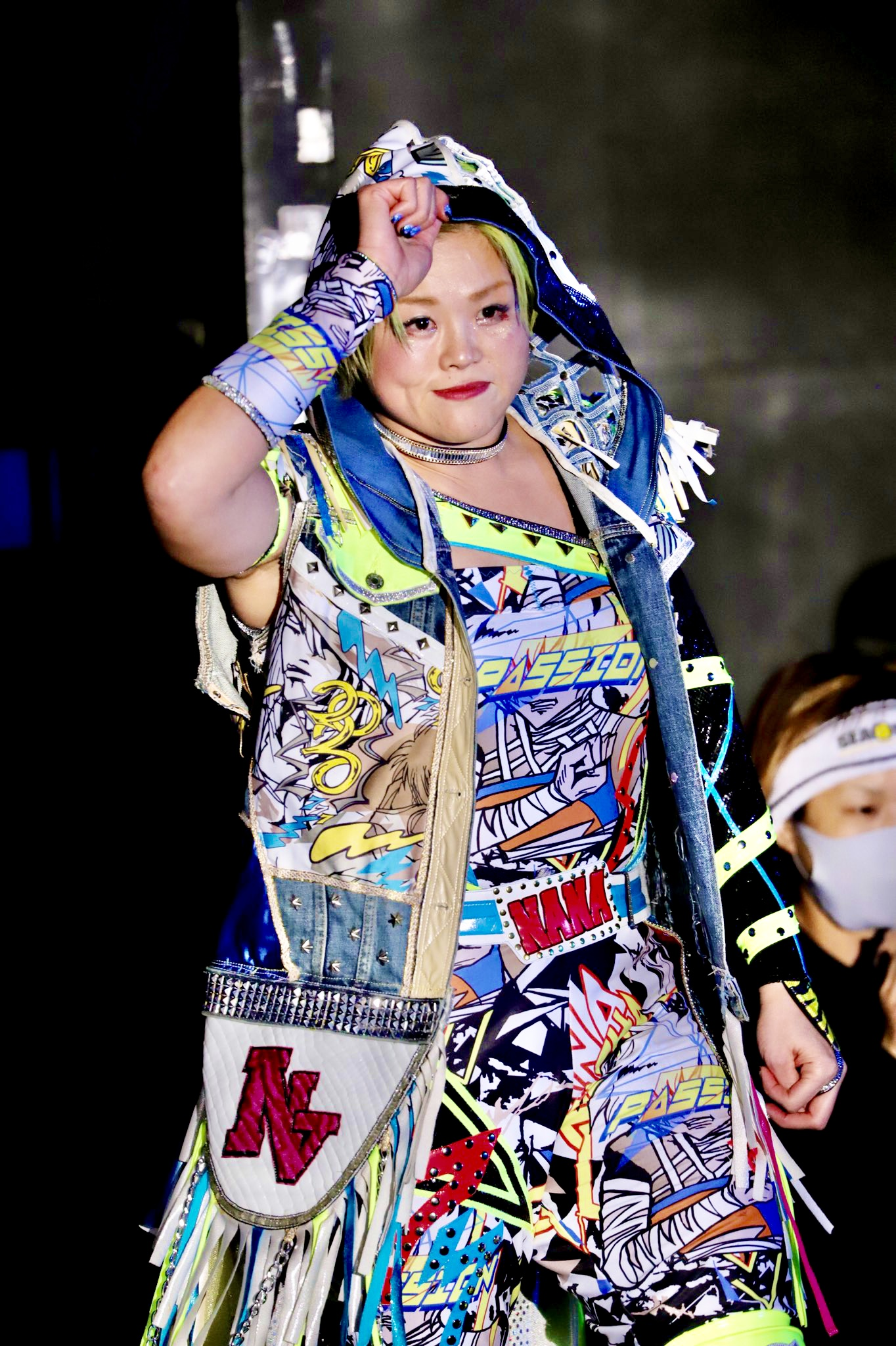
Inaugural champion Nanae Takahashi

On November 1, 2018, Nanae Takahashi, the founder of Seadlinnng, defeated Arisa Nakajima in the finals of an eight-woman single-elimination tournament to become the inaugural champion. On March 9, 2021, the current champion Yoshiko vacated the title to recover from injuries. On March 17, Asuka defeated Rina Yamashita to win the vacant championship.

On October 6, 2022, Nakajima vacated the title suffering an injury. On October 19, Hiroyo Matsumoto defeated Itsuki Aoki in the finals of a ten-woman single-elimination tournament to win the vacant championship.

=== Inaugural championship tournament (2018) ===
Quarterfinals
Ryo Mizunami	13:13
Takumi Iroha	Sub^{1}
Hiroyo Matsumoto	22:20
Nanae Takahashi	Pin
Hanako Nakamori	Pin
Yoshiko	6:05
Arisa Nakajima	Pin
Rina Yamashita	21:05

Semifinals
Takumi Iroha	15:22
Nanae Takahashi	Pin
Hanako Nakamori	12:12
Arisa Nakajima	Pin

Final
Nanae Takahashi	Pin
Arisa Nakajima	18:02

^1 – This was a technical submission.

== Reigns ==
As of November 13, 2026, there have been a total of fourteen reigns shared between ten different champions and two vacancies. Nanae Takahashi was the inaugural champion. Arisa Nakajima hold the record for most reigns at three times. Sareee's first reign is the longest at 511 days, while Makoto has the shortest reign at 66 days. Takahashi is the oldest champion at 39 years old, while Asuka is the youngest at 22 years old.

Ayame Sasamura is the current champion in her first reign. She won the title by defeating Hiroyo Matsumoto at Seadlinnng Jump Up! 2026 on April 17, 2026, in Tokyo, Japan.

Key
No.	Overall reign number
Reign	Reign number for the specific champion
Days	Number of days held
Defenses	Number of successful defenses
+	Current reign is changing daily

No.	Champion	Championship change			Reign statistics			Notes	Ref.
No.	Champion	Date	Event	Location	Reign	Days	Defenses	Notes	Ref.
1	Nanae Takahashi	November 1, 2018	Go! Beyond!	Tokyo, Japan	1	209	3	Takahashi defeated Arisa Nakajima in the finals of an eight-woman single-elimination tournament to become the inaugural champion.	
2	Takumi Iroha	May 29, 2019	Stay Tune	Tokyo, Japan	1	112	1		
3	Arisa Nakajima	September 18, 2019	Endless Summer	Tokyo, Japan	1	299	4		
4	Yoshiko	July 13, 2020	Close to You	Tokyo, Japan	1	239	2		
—	Vacated	March 9, 2021	—	—	—	—	—	The championship was vacated after Yoshiko took time off to recover from injuries	
5	Asuka	March 17, 2021	Grow Together!	Tokyo, Japan	1	116	0	Defeated Rina Yamashita to win the vacant championship.	
6	Ryo Mizunami	July 11, 2021	Nanae Takahashi 25th Anniversary ~ Arigatou	Tokyo, Japan	1	171	2		
7	Arisa Nakajima	December 29, 2021	Seadlinnng 2021 Final Battle	Tokyo, Japan	2	281	3		
—	Vacated	October 6, 2022	—	—	—	—	—	The championship was vacated after Arisa Nakajima suffering a legitimate injury.	
8	Hiroyo Matsumoto	October 19, 2022	October Fist!	Tokyo, Japan	1	70	0	Defeated Itsuki Aoki in the finals of a ten-woman single-elimination tournament to win the vacant championship.	
9	Arisa Nakajima	December 28, 2022	Seadlinnng of the Year 2022!	Tokyo, Japan	3	240	3		
10	Sareee	August 25, 2023	Seadlinnng 8th Anniversary	Tokyo, Japan	1	511	4		
11	Veny	January 17, 2025	Seadlinnng Shin-Kiba Series 2025 Vol. 1	Tokyo, Japan	2	151	2	Veny was previously known as Asuka.	
12	Makoto	June 17, 2025	Seadlinnng Early Summer Games 2025!	Tokyo, Japan	1	66	0		
13	Hiroyo Matsumoto	August 23, 2025	Seadlinnng 10th Anniversary	Tokyo, Japan	2	238	2		
14	Ayame Sasamura	April 17, 2026	Seadlinnng Jump Up! 2026	Tokyo, Japan	1	210+	1	This was the final of the 2026 Seadlinnng Saikyo Tournament.	

== Combined reigns ==
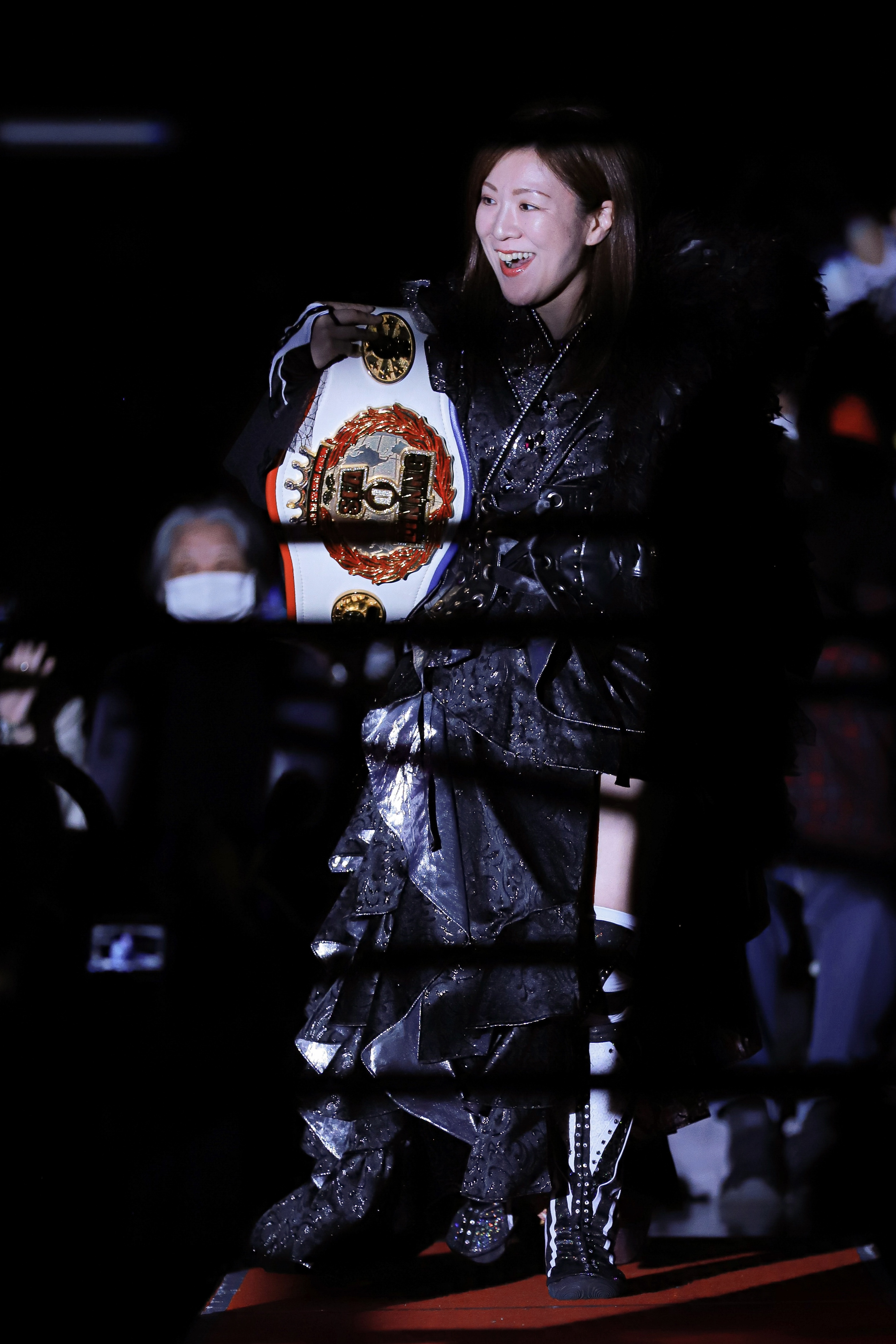
Record three-time and longest combined champion Arisa Nakajima

As of November 13, 2026.

†	Indicates the current champion

Rank	Wrestler	No. of reigns	Combined defenses	Combined days
1	Arisa Nakajima	3	10	820
2	Sareee	1	4	511
3	Hiroyo Matsumoto	2	2	308
4	Asuka/Veny	2	2	267
5	Yoshiko	1	2	239
6	Ayame Sasamura †	1	1	210+
7	Nanae Takahashi	1	3	209
8	Ryo Mizunami	1	2	171
9	Takumi Iroha	1	1	112
10	Makoto	1	0	66
