= Blast Queen Championship =

Women's professional wrestling championship

- The Blast Queen Championship belt

Details
- Promotion: Pro Wrestling Zero1; Super Fireworks Pro Wrestling
- Date established: August 13, 2017
- Current champion(s): Aja Kong
- Date won: July 22, 2023

Other name(s)
- Bakujoō Championship
Statistics
- First champion(s): Chigusa Nagayo
- Most reigns: Hiroyo Matsumoto (2 reigns)
- Longest reign: Hiroyo Matsumoto (1,244 days)
- Shortest reign: Hiroyo Matsumoto (7 days)
- Oldest champion: Chigusa Nagayo (52 years, 300 days)
- Heaviest champion: Aja Kong (227 lbs)

The Blast Queen Championship (Japanese: 爆女王, Hepburn: Bakujoō) is a women's professional wrestling title promoted by both Japanese professional wrestling promotions Pro Wrestling Zero1 and Super Fireworks Pro Wrestling (Chō Hanabi Puroresu). As of April 29, 2022, there have been a total of seven reigns shared between 6 different champions. The current holder is Hiroyo Matsumoto who is in her second reign.

== Title history ==
Key
No.	Overall reign number
Reign	Reign number for the specific champion
Days	Number of days held
Defenses	Number of successful defenses
+	Current reign is changing daily

No.	Champion	Championship change			Reign statistics			Notes	Ref.
No.	Champion	Date	Event	Location	Reign	Days	Defenses	Notes	Ref.
Pro Wrestling Zero1/Super Fireworks Pro Wrestling
1	Chigusa Nagayo	August 13, 2017	N/A	N/A	1	168	1	It is unknown how Nagayo was billed as the inaugural champion. Her first recorded defense took place at Current Blast Festival 2017 on November 3 where she defeated Nanae Takahashi.	
2	Yoshiko	January 28, 2018	Zero1	Osaka, Japan	1	175	0	This was a four-way match also involving Akane Fujita and Voodoo Lady Mask.	
3	Risa Sera	July 22, 2018	Zero1 Fire Festival 2018	Osaka, Japan	1	209	2	This was a tag team match in which Sera teamed up with Yoshiko against Akane Fujita and Nanae Takahashi. Sera pinned Fujita to win both the match and title.	
4	Nanae Takahashi	February 16, 2019	Super Fireworks Current Blast Festival 2019	Kawasaki, Japan	1	183	0	This was a current blast match (Note: This was a tag team match in which also the tag team partner can win the championship if scoring the pinfall.) in which Takahashi teamed up with Ryo Mizunami against Risa Sera and Hiroyo Matsumoto. Takahashi pinned Matsumoto to win both the match and title.	
5	Hiroyo Matsumoto	August 18, 2019	Super Fireworks Current Blast Festival 2019	Kawasaki, Japan	1	7	0	This was a No Rope Barbed Wire & Current Blast & Double Hell & Current Blast Table match.	
6	Mayumi Ozaki	August 25, 2019	Plum Hanasaku 2019	Yokohama, Japan	1	183	0	This was a Barbed Wire Current Blast Bat Deathmatch also for the Oz Academy Openweight Championship, held at an Oz Academy event.	
7	Hiroyo Matsumoto	February 24, 2020	Super Fireworks Anniversary Show	Kawasaki, Japan	2	1,244	2	This was a Super Plasma Blast Deathmatch where Matsumoto teamed up with Aja Kong against Saori Anou and Mayumi Ozaki and scored the pin over the latter.	
8	Aja Kong	July 22, 2023	23rd Midsummer Festival ~ Fire Festival 2023	Osaka, Japan	1	607+	1		

== Combined reigns ==
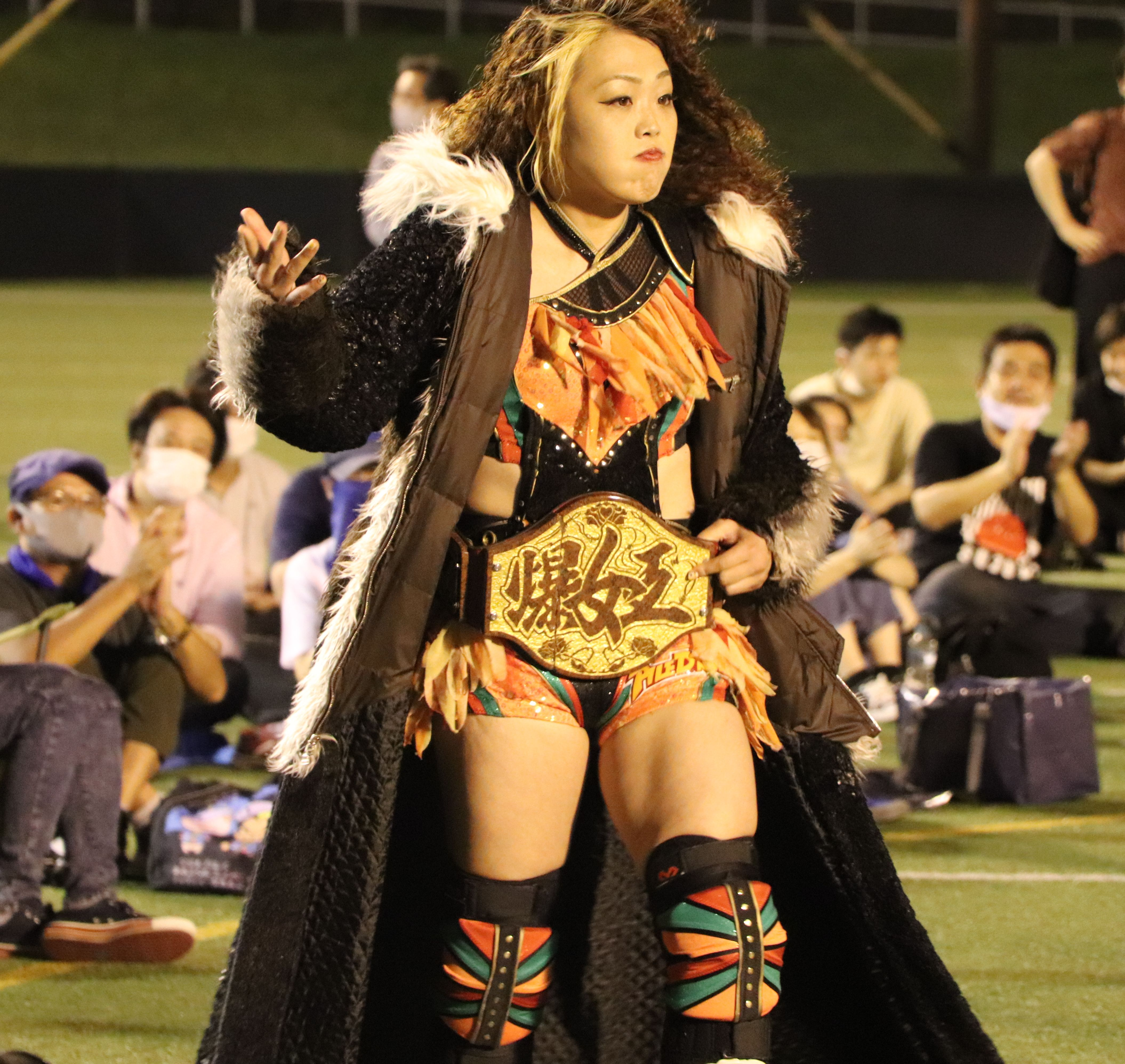
Record two-time and longest reigning champion Hiroyo Matsumoto.

†	Indicates the current champion

Rank	Wrestler	No. of reigns	Combined days
1	Hiroyo Matsumoto	2	1,244
2	Aja Kong †	1	607+
3	Risa Sera	1	208
4	Mayumi Ozaki	1	183
4	Nanae Takahashi	1	183
6	Yoshiko	1	175
7	Chigusa Nagayo	1	168
