= Tomoko Watanabe (wrestler) =

Japanese professional wrestler

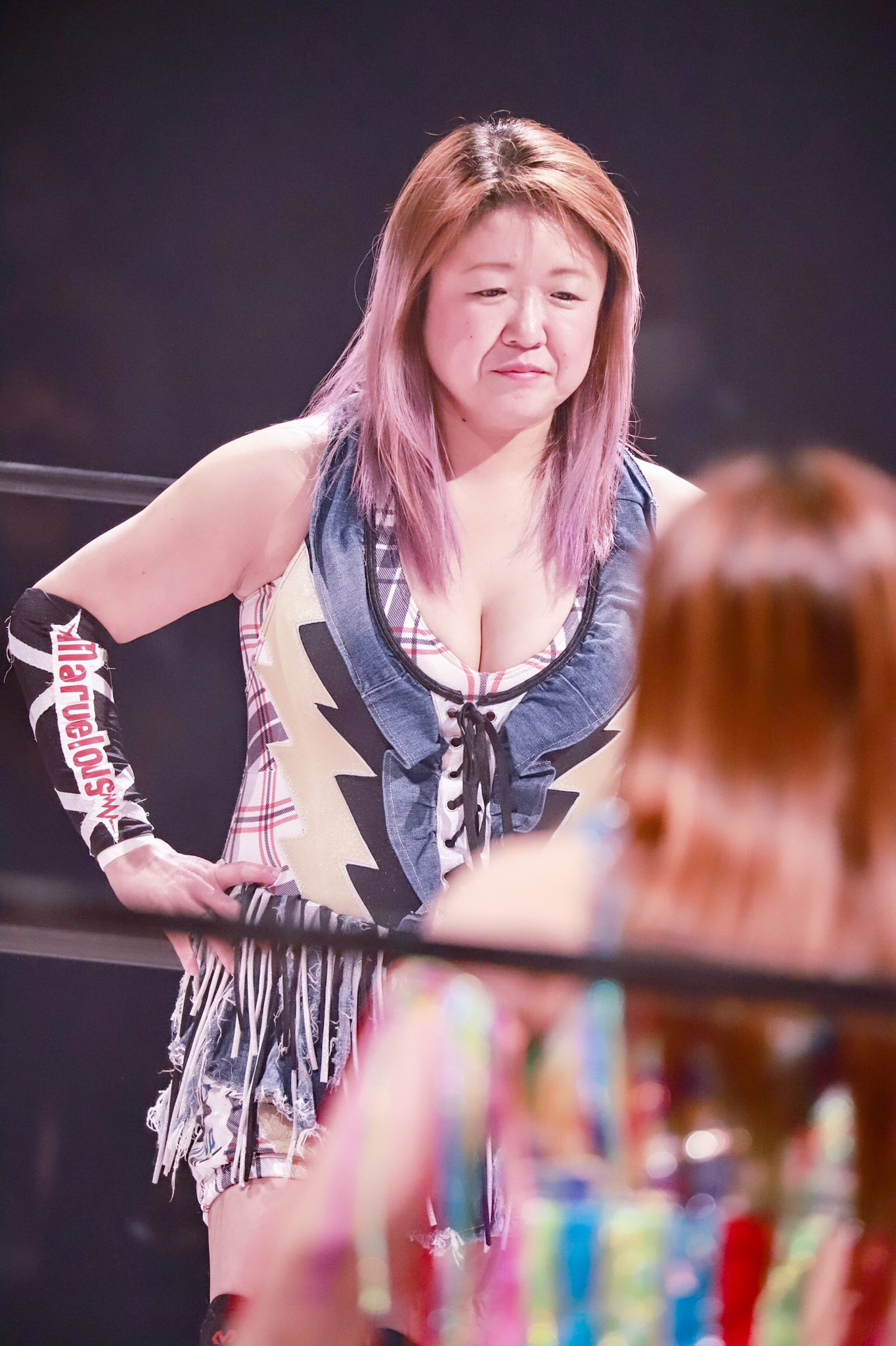
- Watanabe in May 2021

Personal information
- Born: February 23, 1972 (age 54) Chiba, Japan

Professional wrestling career
- Ring name(s): Tomoko Watanabe; Satoko Watanabe; Candy #2; ZAP T ZAP
- Billed height: 160 cm (5 ft 3 in)
- Billed weight: 73 kg (161 lb)
- Trained by: Jaguar Yokota
- Debut: 1990

Tomoko Watanabe (渡辺智子, Watanabe Tomoko) is a Japanese professional wrestler currently signed to the Japanese promotion Marvelous That's Women Pro Wrestling. A veteran of the Japanese independent scene, Watanabe is known for her tenures with now-defunct promotions All Japan Women's Pro-Wrestling and JWP Joshi Puroresu.

== Professional wrestling career ==
=== All Japan Women's Pro-Wrestling (1990–2005) ===
During her fifteen-year tenure with the promotion, Watanabe chased for various championships promoted by it. She has held the AJW Championship on two separate occasions, the All Pacific Championship on three, AJW Tag Team Championship two times, once alongside Takako Inoue and once with Bat Yoshinaga, and the WWWA World Tag Team Championship five times, three of them with Kumiko Maekawa, one time with Zap I under the gimmick of team "Zap", and once with Nanae Takahashi. Despite being an accomplished wrestler in the company, there have still been many titles she never succeeded winning even if competing for them. At AJW Wrestling Queendom 1995 Victory on March 26, she teamed up with Suzuka Minami and unsuccessfully challenged Las Cachorras Orientales (Etsuko Mita and Mima Shimoda) for the UWA World Women's Tag Team Championship.

Due to AJWP sharing business partnerships with various other promotions from the Japanese independent scene, Watanabe often competed in cross-over events. At AJW/LLPW, an event held alongside Ladies Legend Pro-Wrestling on March 10, 1999, she defeated Eagle Sawai in singles competition. On the first night of Big Japan Pro Wrestling's 2000 edition of the New Year Great Series from January 2, Watanabe defeated Kiyoko Ichiki.

Watanabe competed in various of the promotion's signarute events. As for the Tag League the Best, she made her first appearance at the 1992 edition where she teamed up with Bat Yoshinaga and scored a total of three points after competing against the teams of Aja Kong and Kyoko Inoue, Manami Toyota and Toshiyo Yamada, Debbie Malenko and Sakie Hasegawa, Suzuka Minami and Yumiko Hotta, Takako Inoue and Terri Power, Las Cachorras Orientales (Etsuko Mita and Mima Shimoda), Miori Kamiya and Kaoru Ito, and Erica Tsuchiya and Yukari Maedomari. At the 1993 edition, she teamed up with Kaoru Ito and failed to score any points after going against Kyoko Inoue and Toshiyo Yamada, Akira Hokuto and Manami Toyota, Eagle Sawai and Yasha Kurenai, Takako Inoue and Yumiko Hotta, Bull Nakano and Suzuka Minami, Aja Kong and Sakie Hasegawa, and Las Cachorras Orientales (Etsuko Mita and Mima Shimoda). She scored the best result at the 1995 edition where she teamed up with Kyoko Inoue by topping the league with a total of ten points by outmatching the teams of Kaoru Ito and Manami Toyota, Reggie Bennett and Yumiko Hotta, Aja Kong and Takako Inoue, Akira Hokuto and Mima Shimoda, Dream Orca (Etsuko Mita and Toshiyo Yamada), Mariko Yoshida and Sakie Hasegawa, and Chaparita Asari and Yoshiko Tamura, after which they would defeat Ito and Toyota in the finals to win the whole competition. At the 1998 edition she teamed up with Kaoru Ito as team ZAP, where Ito was billed as Zap I and Watanabe as Zap T. They scored a total of nine points after going against Nana☆Momo☆ (Momoe Nakanishi and Nanae Takahashi), Manami Toyota and Yumiko Hotta, Kayo Noumi and Miho Wakizawa, Emi Motokawa and Sachie Noshibori, Mayumi Takahashi and Miyuki Fujii, and Kumiko Maekawa and Mika Haikae. She marked her last appearance at the 2004 edition which was held under a round-robin tournament system, where she teamed up with Emi Tojo and fell short to Kana and Yumiko Hotta in the first rounds.

In the Japan Grand Prix, the biggest yearly event hosted by the promotion, Watanabe made her first appearance at the 1992 edition where she competed in the block A, scoring a total of three points after competing against Manami Toyota, Aja Kong, Takako Inoue, Suzuka Minami, Etsuko Mita, Mima Shimoda, Bat Yoshinaga, Cynthia Moreno and Bison Kimura. After competing in every edition of the tournament without missing any, she made her last appearance at the 2004 competition where she fell short to Kumiko Maekawa.

=== Independent circuit (1991–present) ===
Watanabe is known for competing in various promotions from the Japanese independent scene. At JD Star Boogie Wonder Land ~ Thursday Night Fever ~, an event promoted by JDStar on October 16, 2003, she teamed up with Sasori (Miyuki Fuji) in a losing effort against Hiroyo Muto and Ranmaru as a result of a tag team match. At a house show promoted by NEO Japan Ladies Pro-Wrestling on January 8, 2006, she teamed up with Dump Matsumoto to defeat Keiko Aono and Kyoko Inoue. At Manami Toyota's Retirement Show on November 3, 2017, Watanabe competed in gauntlet match in which she came up the 44th against Toyota. The match also involved various other notable opponents such as Tsukasa Fujimoto, Kaoru Maeda, Chigusa Nagayo, Carlos Amano, Asuka, Tequila Saya, Tsubasa Kuragaki and many others. At a house show promoted by Pure-J on October 17, 2017, she teamed up with Dump Matsumoto to defeat Saki and Yako Fujigasaki. At Seadlinnng Yokohama Flash! 2018from November 24, she teamed up with Mei Hoshizuki in a losing effort against Arisa Nakajima and Ayame Sasamura.

=== World Wrestling Federation (1995) ===
Due to All Japan Women's Pro-Wrestling business relations with World Wrestling Federation, Watanabe competed in the latter promotion's flagship event Survivor Series 1995 where she competed in the traditional Survivor Series elimination match where she teamed up with Bertha Faye, Aja Kong and Lioness Asuka to defeat Alundra Blayze, Kyoko Inoue, Sakie Hasegawa and Chaparita Asari. She also made an appearance at Monday Night RAW #137 on November 20, 1995, where she teamed up with Aja Kong to defeat Alundra Blayze and Kyoko Inoue.

=== World Woman Pro-Wrestling Diana (2011–2021) ===
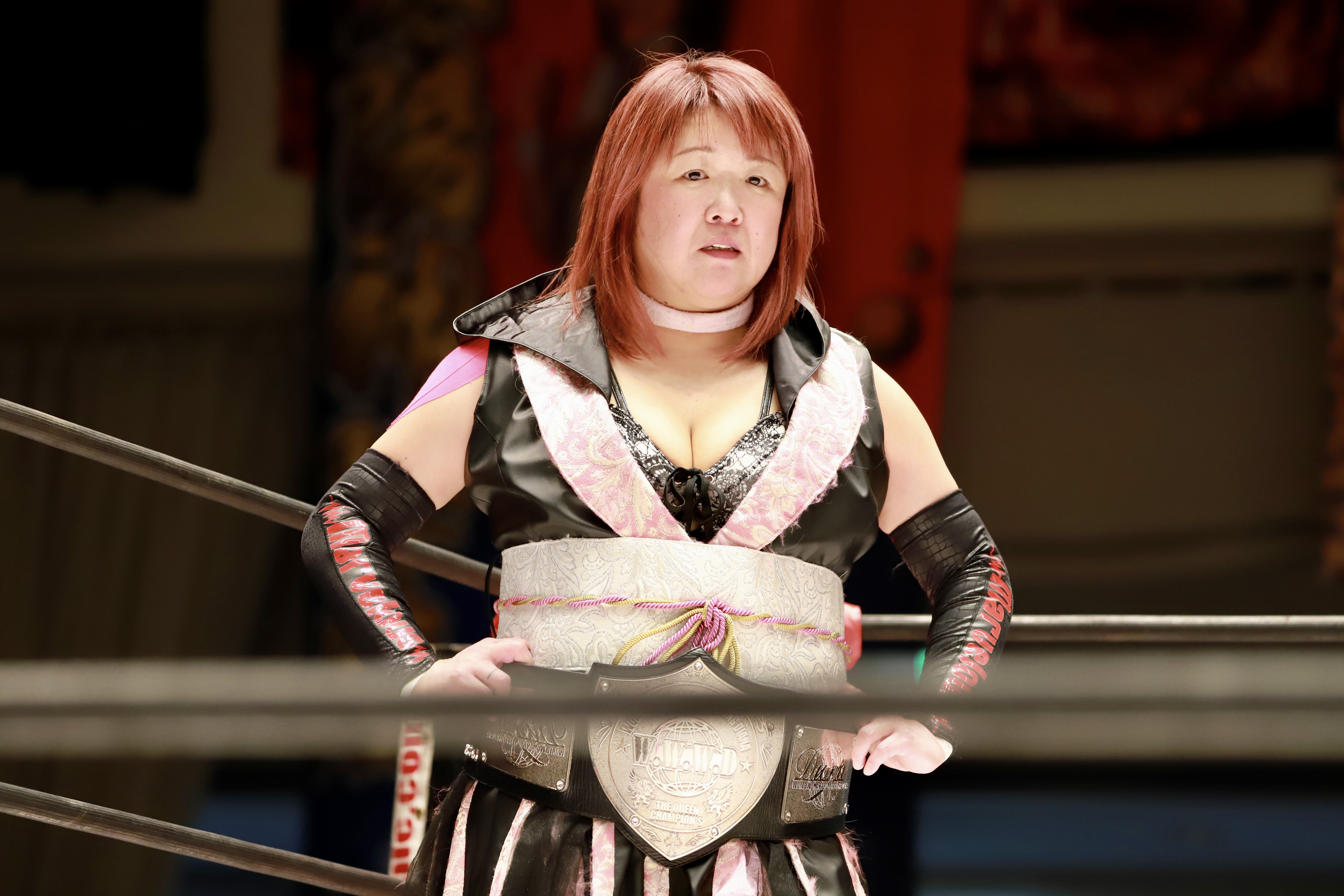
Watanabe as one half of the World Woman Pro-Wrestling Diana Tag Team Champions in October 2019

Watanabe made her debut in World Woman Pro-Wrestling Diana at Diana Kaoru Ito 23. Anniversary In Osaka on October 9, 2011, where she teamed up with Kaoru Ito to defeat Jaguar Yokota and Kyoko Inoue. During her time with the promotion, she has been a former three-time tag team champion, two times alongside Kaoru Ito and one time alongside Kyoko Inoue. She often competed in special events such as Kyoko Inoue's 25th Anniversary from October 8, 2012, where she took part in a gauntlet match in which Inoue wrestled every opponent into a time-limit draw. Some of her notable opponents were Watanabe herself, Command Bolshoi, Megumi Yabushita, Meiko Satomura, and male wrestlers such as The Great Kabuki, Hayabusa and Ricky Fuji.

=== Marvelous That's Women Pro Wrestling (2015–present) ===
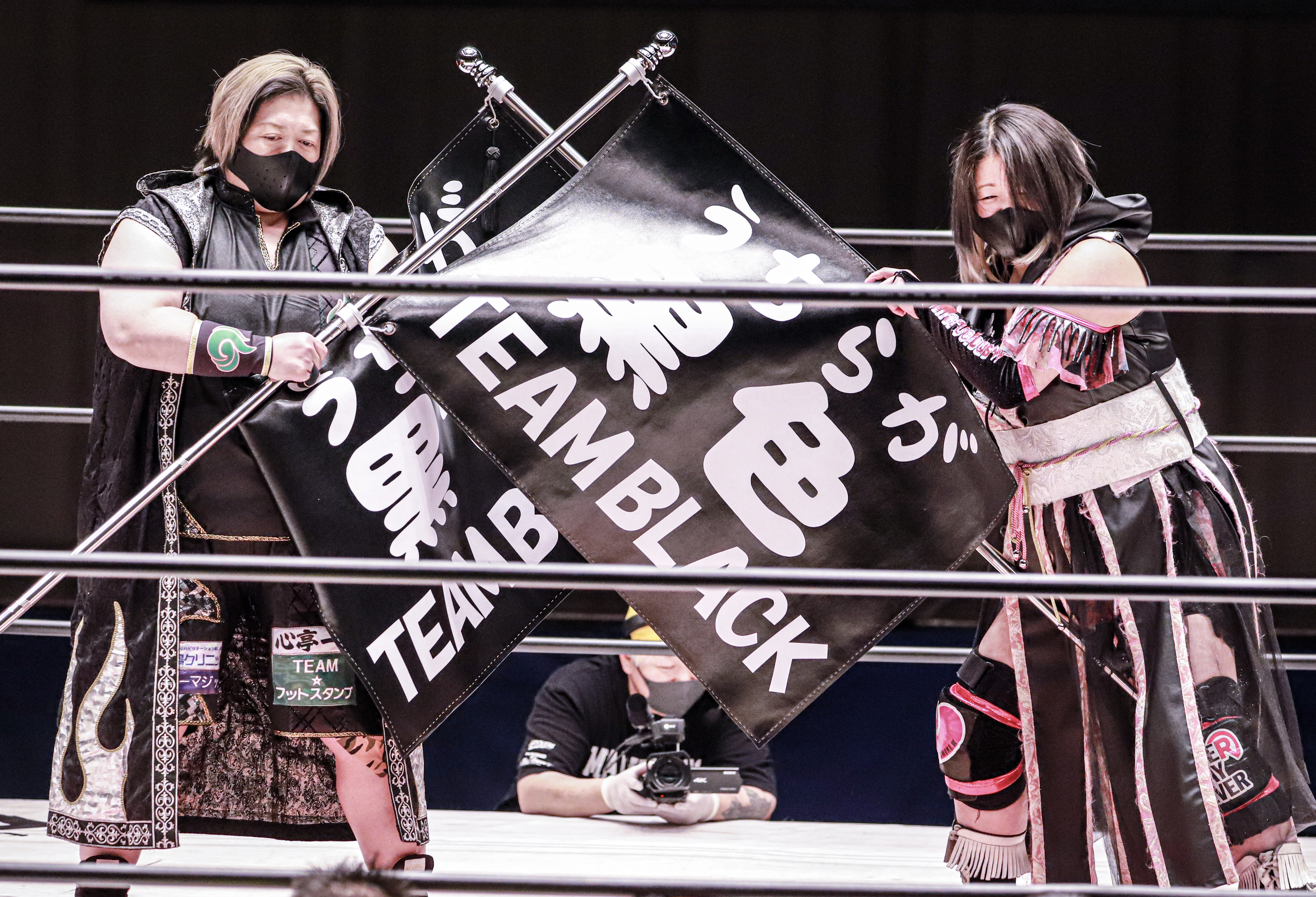
Watanabe (right) and Kaoru Ito as "Team Black" at a Marvelous event in January 2022

Watanabe made her debut in Marvelous in early 2015. Her most notable work focused on title matches. At Marvelous 6th Anniversary on May 1, 2022, she teamed up with Kaoru Ito and unsuccessfully challenged Itsuki Aoki and Rin Kadokura for the resurrected AAAW Tag Team Championship. At a house show from December 4, 2022, she went into a time-limit draw against Unagi Sayaka in the second rounds of a tournament to crown a new AAAW Single Champion, therefore attracting an elimination.

=== Pro Wrestling Wave (2017, 2019–2021) ===
Watanabe is known for competing in Pro Wrestling Wave's signature events. She made her first appearance in the Catch the Wave tournament at the 2021 edition where she fought in the "Jealousy Block", scoring a total of three points after competing against Kaori Yoneyama, Yumi Ohka and Yako. At Joshi Pro Osaka Assemble ~ Grand Finale, a semi-independent event held on October 14, 2019, Watanabe competed in a battle royal won by Syuri and also involving Cherry, Hanako Nakamori, Maria, Miyuki Takase, Nagisa Nozaki, Sakura Hirota, Takumi Iroha, Yuki Miyazaki and others. At WAVE NAMI 1 on December 1, 2021, she competed in the second rounds of a tournament to determine the new number one cintender for the Wave Single Championship in a four-way match won by Itsuki Aoki and also involving Haruka Umesaki and Yuki Miyazaki.

== Championships and accomplishments ==
- All Japan Women's Pro-Wrestling
  - AJW Championship (2 times)
  - All Pacific Championship (3 times)
  - AJW Tag Team Championship (2 times) – with Bat Yoshinaga (1) and Takako Inoue (1)
  - WWWA World Tag Team Championship (5 times) – with Kumiko Maekawa (3) Nanae Takahashi (1) and Zap I (1)
  - Tag League the Best (1995) – with Kyoko Inoue
  - Grand North Six Woman Tag League (1995–1997)
- JWP Joshi Puroresu
  - JWP Tag Team Championship (1 time) – with Zap I
- Oz Academy
  - Best Wizard Award (1 time)
    - Best Bout Award (2023) with Chigusa Nagayo and Mio Momono vs. Kakeru, Mayumi Ozaki and Saori Anou on October 22
- Pro Wrestling Wave
  - Catch the Wave Award (1 time)
    - Best Bout Award (2021) vs. Yako on June 8
- World Woman Pro-Wrestling Diana
  - World Woman Pro-Wrestling Diana Tag Team Championship (3 times) – Kaoru Ito (2) and Kyoko Inoue (1)
