= Japan Grand Prix =

Professional wrestling tournament

The Japan Grand Prix was an annual professional wrestling tournament held by the promotion All Japan Women's Pro-Wrestling (AJW) to determine the number one contender for the promotion's highest achievement, the WWWA World Single Championship. The tournament was held in the summer every year from 1985 to 2004. In 2005, AJW was closed for good, and the WWWA Championship was abandoned.

== List of winners ==
- 1985 – Lioness Asuka
- 1986 – Yukari Omori
- 1987 – Chigusa Nagayo
- 1988 – Bull Nakano
- 1989 – Mitsuko Nishiwaki
- 1990 – Manami Toyota
- 1991 – Kyoko Inoue
- 1992 – Aja Kong
- 1993 – Akira Hokuto
- 1994 – Yumiko Hotta
- 1995 – Manami Toyota
- 1996 – Aja Kong
- 1997 – Kaoru Ito
- 1998 – Manami Toyota
- 1999 – Manami Toyota
- 2000 – Kaoru Ito; Nanae Takahashi (Junior division)
- 2001 – Momoe Nakanishi
- 2002 – Nanae Takahashi
- 2003 – Amazing Kong
- 2004 – Kumiko Maekawa

== Results ==
=== 1985 ===
The 1985 Japan Grand Prix was a 10-woman round-robin tournament concluding on June 25, 1985.

Wrestler:	Points:
Lioness Asuka	7.0
Dump Matsumoto	6.5
Chigusa Nagayo	6.5
Devil Masami	6.0
Yukari Omori	5.0
Jumbo Hori	4.5
Noriyo Tateno	3.5
Crane Yu	2.5
Itsuki Yamazaki	2.0
Bull Nakano	1.5

Second-place tie-breaker		Final
		1	Lioness Asuka
2	Dump Matsumoto		Dump Matsumoto
3	Chigusa Nagayo

=== 1986 ===
The 1986 Japan Grand Prix was a 12-woman round-robin tournament concluding on June 22, 1986.

Wrestler:	Points:
Yukari Omori	9.0
Lioness Asuka	8.5
Chigusa Nagayo	8.5
Dump Matsumoto	8.5
Bull Nakano	6.5
Itsuki Yamazaki	6.5
Noriyo Tateno	5.5
?	4.5
?	3.5
?	2.5
?	2.0
Condor Saito	0.5

Finals
1	Chigusa Nagayo	Pin
2	Yukari Omori	27:21

=== 1987 ===
The 1987 Japan Grand Prix was a 13-woman round-robin tournament concluding on June 28, 1987.

Wrestler:	Points:
Chigusa Nagayo	9.0
Dump Matsumoto	9.0
Yumiko Hotta	9.0
Lioness Asuka	7.5
?	7.0
?	7.0
?	6.5
Devil Masami	6.0
Bull Nakano	5.0
?	4.0
Condor Saito	3.0
Hisako Uno	2.0
?	2.0

Second-place tie-breaker			Final
			1	Chigusa Nagayo
2	Yumiko Hotta			Dump Matsumoto	12:26
3	Dump Matsumoto	5:46

=== 1988 ===
The 1988 Japan Grand Prix was an 11-woman round-robin tournament concluding on June 26, 1988.

Wrestler:	Points:
Bull Nakano	7.5
Yumiko Hotta	7.5
Mitsuko Nishiwaki	7.5
?	6.0
Dynamite Queen	6.0
Hisako Uno	5.5
Mika Suzuki	5.0
Dynamite King	4.0
?	3.0
?	3.0
Dynamite Bar	0.0

Second-place tie-breaker			Final
			1	Yumiko Hotta
2	Bull Nakano			Bull Nakano	10:30
3	Mitsuko Nishiwaki	10:37

=== 1989 ===
The 1989 Japan Grand Prix was a 19-woman single-elimination tournament held from June 25 to August 24, 1989.

First round
Yumiko Hotta
Mika Takahashi
Miori Kamiya
Erika Shishido
Suzuka Minami
Etsuko Mita

Second round
Noriyo Tateno
Yumiko Hotta
?
Mima Shimoda
Kaoru Maeda
?
Erika Shishido
Madusa Miceli
Bull Nakano
Suzuka Minami
Akira Hokuto
Manami Toyota
Sakie Hasegawa
Toshiyo Yamada
Bison Kimura
Mitsuko Nishiwaki

Quarterfinals
Yumiko Hotta
?
?
Madusa Miceli
Bull Nakano
Akira Hokuto
Toshiyo Yamada
Mitsuko Nishiwaki

Semifinals
Yumiko Hotta
Madusa Miceli
Bull Nakano
Mitsuko Nishiwaki

Final
Madusa Miceli
Mitsuko Nishiwaki

=== 1990 ===
The 1990 Japan Grand Prix was a seven-woman single-elimination tournament concluding on June 17, 1990.

Quarterfinals
Akira Hokuto
Manami Toyota
Madusa Miceli
Noriyo Tateno
Yumiko Hotta
Grizzly Iwamoto

Semifinals
Manami Toyota
Madusa Miceli
Yumiko Hotta
Mitsuko Nishiwaki

Finals
Manami Toyota
Yumiko Hotta

=== 1991 ===
The 1991 Japan Grand Prix was a 16-woman single-elimination tournament held from July 7 to August 18, 1991.

First round
Mima Shimoda
Manami Toyota
Takako Inoue
Suzuka Minami
Miori Kamiya
Toshiyo Yamada
Kyoko Inoue
Debbie Malenko
Esther Moreno
Mariko Yoshida
Yumiko Hotta
Aja Kong
Akira Hokuto
Etsuko Mita
Bison Kimura
Mika Takahashi

Quarterfinals
Manami Toyota
Suzuka Minami
Toshiyo Yamada
Kyoko Inoue
Mariko Yoshida
Aja Kong
Akira Hokuto
Bison Kimura

Semifinals
Manami Toyota
Kyoko Inoue
Bison Kimura
Aja Kong

Finals
Kyoko Inoue
Bison Kimura

=== 1992 ===
The 1992 Japan Grand Prix was a round-robin tournament consisting of two 10-woman blocks, held from June 27 to August 30, 1992.

Block A		Block B	
Wrestler:	Points:	Wrestler:	Points:
Manami Toyota	9.0	Toshiyo Yamada	8.0
Aja Kong	8.0	Mariko Yoshida	7.0
Takako Inoue	6.0	Kyoko Inoue	7.0
Suzuka Minami	5.0	Akira Hokuto	4.5
Etsuko Mita	5.0	Sakie Hasegawa	4.0
Mima Shimoda	5.0	Yumiko Hotta	4.0
Bat Yoshinaga	4.0	Miori Kamiya	3.0
Tomoko Watanabe	3.0	Debbie Malenko	3.0
Cynthia Moreno	1.0	Terri Power	3.0
Bison Kimura	0.0	Kaoru Ito	1.5

Semifinal			Final
			1	Manami Toyota
2	Aja Kong			Aja Kong	13:01
3	Toshiyo Yamada	17:07

=== 1993 ===
The 1993 Japan Grand Prix was a round-robin tournament consisting of two eight-woman blocks, with the top two finishers from each block advancing to a single-elimination tournament. It was held from May 3 to August 21, 1993.

Block A		Block B	
Wrestler:	Points:	Wrestler:	Points:
Akira Hokuto	6.0	Yumiko Hotta	6.0
Harley Saito	5.0	Manami Toyota	5.0
Toshiyo Yamada	4.5	Bat Yoshinaga	5.0
Suzuka Minami	3.0	Hikari Fukuoka	4.0
Sakie Hasegawa	3.0	Kyoko Inoue	3.5
Takako Inoue	3.0	Mima Shimoda	2.5
Etsuko Mita	3.0	Kaoru Ito	2.0
Tomoko Watanabe	0.5	Saemi Numata	0.0

Semifinals
A1	Akira Hokuto
B2	Manami Toyota
B1	Yumiko Hotta
A2	Harley Saito

Final
A1	Akira Hokuto
B1	Yumiko Hotta	19:52

=== 1994 ===
The 1994 Japan Grand Prix was a 10-woman round-robin tournament held from June 3 to August 28, 1994.

Wrestler:	Points:
Yumiko Hotta	13
Manami Toyota	12
Sakie Hasegawa	11
Toshiyo Yamada	10
Mima Shimoda	10
Takako Inoue	10
Etsuko Mita	10
Suzuka Minami	8
Kaoru Ito	6
Tomoko Watanabe	0

=== 1995 ===
The 1995 Japan Grand Prix was a 16-woman round-robin tournament, consisting of two eight-woman blocks, concluding on September 3, 1995.

Block A		Block B	
Wrestler:	Points:	Wrestler:	Points:
Manami Toyota	11	Yumiko Hotta	12
Bison Kimura	9	Takako Inoue	11
Reggie Bennett	8	Kyoko Inoue	9
Kaoru Ito	8	Mariko Yoshida	8
Mima Shimoda	8	Sakie Hasegawa	6
Toshiyo Yamada	8	Etsuko Mita	6
Rie Tamada	2	Tomoko Watanabe	4
Chaparita Asari	0	Kumiko Maekawa	0

Finals
A1	Manami Toyota	Pin
B1	Yumiko Hotta	23:39

=== 1996 ===
The 1996 Japan Grand Prix was a 12-woman round-robin tournament held from July 14 to August 30, 1996.

Wrestler:	Points:
Aja Kong	16
Reggie Bennett	14
Yumiko Hotta	14
Kyoko Inoue	14
Mima Shimoda	12
Toshiyo Yamada	12
Takako Inoue	10
Kaoru Ito	10
Etsuko Mita	8
Tomoko Watanabe	8
Mariko Yoshida	8
Chaparita Asari	4

=== 1997 ===
The 1997 Japan Grand Prix was a 12-woman round-robin tournament concluding on August 10, 1997.

Wrestler:	Points:
Kaoru Ito	18
Manami Toyota	17
Kumiko Maekawa	16
Etsuko Mita	15
Mima Shimoda	15
Tomoko Watanabe	15
Rie Tamada	10 †
Saya Endo	7
Misae Genki	5 †
Tanny Mouse	4 †
Yoshiko Tamura	4 †
Mariko Yoshida	2

† These scores are not the actual scores. These wrestlers had one match with the results unknown.

=== 1998 ===
The 1998 Japan Grand Prix was a round-robin tournament consisting of two six-woman blocks, with the top three finishers from the Main League and the top finisher from the Junior League advancing to a single-elimination tournament. It was held from June 14 to August 9, 1998.

Main League		Junior League	
Wrestler:	Points:	Wrestler:	Points:
Manami Toyota	12	Miho Wakizawa	12
Zap I	12	Emi Motokawa	12
Yumiko Hotta	12	Momoe Nakawaki	12
Takako Inoue	10	Nanae Takahashi	11
Kumiko Maekeawa	8	Noriko Toyoda	9
Zap T	6	ZAP Nakahara	5

Semifinals
J1	Miho Wakizawa	Pin
M2	ZAP I	13:26
M1	Manami Toyota	Pin
M3	Yumiko Hotta	20:31

Final
M2	ZAP I	Pin
M1	Manami Toyota	23:47

=== 1999 ===
The 1999 Japan Grand Prix was a nine-woman round-robin tournament, with the second, third and fourth finishers advancing to a second round-robin. The winner of the second round-robin advanced to face the first-place finisher from the initial round-robin. The tournament was held from June 6 to August 15, 1999.

Wrestler:	Points:
Yumiko Hotta	11
Manami Toyota	9
Kaoru Ito	9
Momoe Nakanishi	9
Takako Inoue	8
Kumiko Maekawa	8
Nanae Takahashi	7
Tomoko Watanabe	6
Miho Wakizawa	5

Wrestler:	Points:
Manami Toyota	4
Kaoru Ito	2
Momoe Nakanishi	2

	Ito	Nakanishi	Toyota
Ito	—	Ito (1:32)	Toyota (4:17)
Nakanishi	Ito (1:32)	—	(1) Nakanishi (10:46) (2) Toyota (2:08)
Toyota	Toyota (4:17)	(1) Nakanishi (10:46) (2) Toyota (2:08)	—

Final
1	Yumiko Hotta	Pin
2	Manami Toyota	18:45

=== 2000 ===
The 2000 Japan Grand Prix was a nine-woman single-elimination tournament held from June 11 to August 20, 2000. Also a six-woman Junior Division round-robin tournament was held.

Main league

First round
Mima Shimoda
Manami Toyota

Quarterfinals
Reggie Bennett
Kaoru Ito
Kumiko Maekawa
Tomoko Watanabe
Etsuko Mita
Nanae Takahashi
Manami Toyota
Yumiko Hotta

Semifinals
Kaoru Ito
Tomoko Watanabe
Etsuko Mita
Yumiko Hotta

Final
Kaoru Ito
Etsuko Mita

21st Century League

Wrestler:	Points:
Nanae Takahashi	7
Momoe Nakanishi	7
Kayoko Haruyama	5
Miho Wakizawa	5
Kayo Noumi	4
Miyuki Fuji	2

Final
1	Momoe Nakanishi
2	Nanae Takahashi	7:44

=== 2001 ===
The 2001 Japan Grand Prix was a 12-woman round-robin tournament held from June 1 to August 17, 2001.

Wrestler:	Points:
Momoe Nakanishi	16
Kumiko Maekawa	16
Kaoru Ito	15
Manami Toyota	13
Etsuko Mita	13
Tomoko Watanabe	12
Mima Shimoda	12
Yumiko Hotta	11
Miho Wakizawa	10
Nanae Takahashi	10
Kayo Noumi	4
Miyuki Fuji	0

Final
1	Kumiko Maekawa	Pin
2	Momoe Nakanishi	12:28

=== 2002 ===
The 2002 Japan Grand Prix was a nine-woman round-robin tournament held from May 25 to July 9, 2002. The top four finishers advanced to a single-elimination tournament.

Wrestler:	Points:
Nanae Takahashi	10
Momoe Nakanishi	10
Rie Tamada	10
Kumiko Maekawa	10
Yumiko Hotta	9
Tomoko Watanabe	9
Kayo Noumi	8
Miyuki Gujii	4
Kaoru Ito	2

Semifinals
1	Nanae Takahashi	Pin
4	Kumiko Maekawa	6:57
2	Momoe Nakanishi	Pin
3	Yumiko Hotta	5:53

Final
1	Nanae Takahashi	Sub
2	Momoe Nakanishi	6:20

=== 2003 ===
The 2003 Japan Grand Prix was a 10-woman single-elimination tournament held from July 20 to August 3, 2003.

First round
Kumiko Maekawa
Emi Sakura
Amazing Kong
Makai Witch #2

Quarterfinals
Sasori
Kumiko Maekawa
Kayo Noumi
Nanae Takahashi
Amazing Kong
Takako Inoue
Hikaru
Zap T

Semifinals
Sasori
Nanae Takahashi
Amazing Kong
ZAP T

Final
Nanae Takahashi
Amazing Kong

=== 2004 ===
The 2004 Japan Grand Prix was a 10-woman single-elimination tournament held on August 1, 2004.

First round
Saki Maemura
Sasori
Amazing Kong
Kumiko Maekawa

Quarterfinals
Hikaru
Sasori
Misae Genki
Nanae Takahashi
Kumiko Maekawa
Tomoko Watanabe
Takako Inoue
6	Mayumi Ozaki

Semifinals
Hikaru
Misae Genki
Kumiko Maekawa
Takako Inoue

Final
Hikaru
Kumiko Maekawa

== See also ==
- All Japan Women's Pro-Wrestling
- Tag League the Best
- G1 Climax
- Champion Carnival
- Global League
