= Kaoru Ito =

Japanese professional wrestler

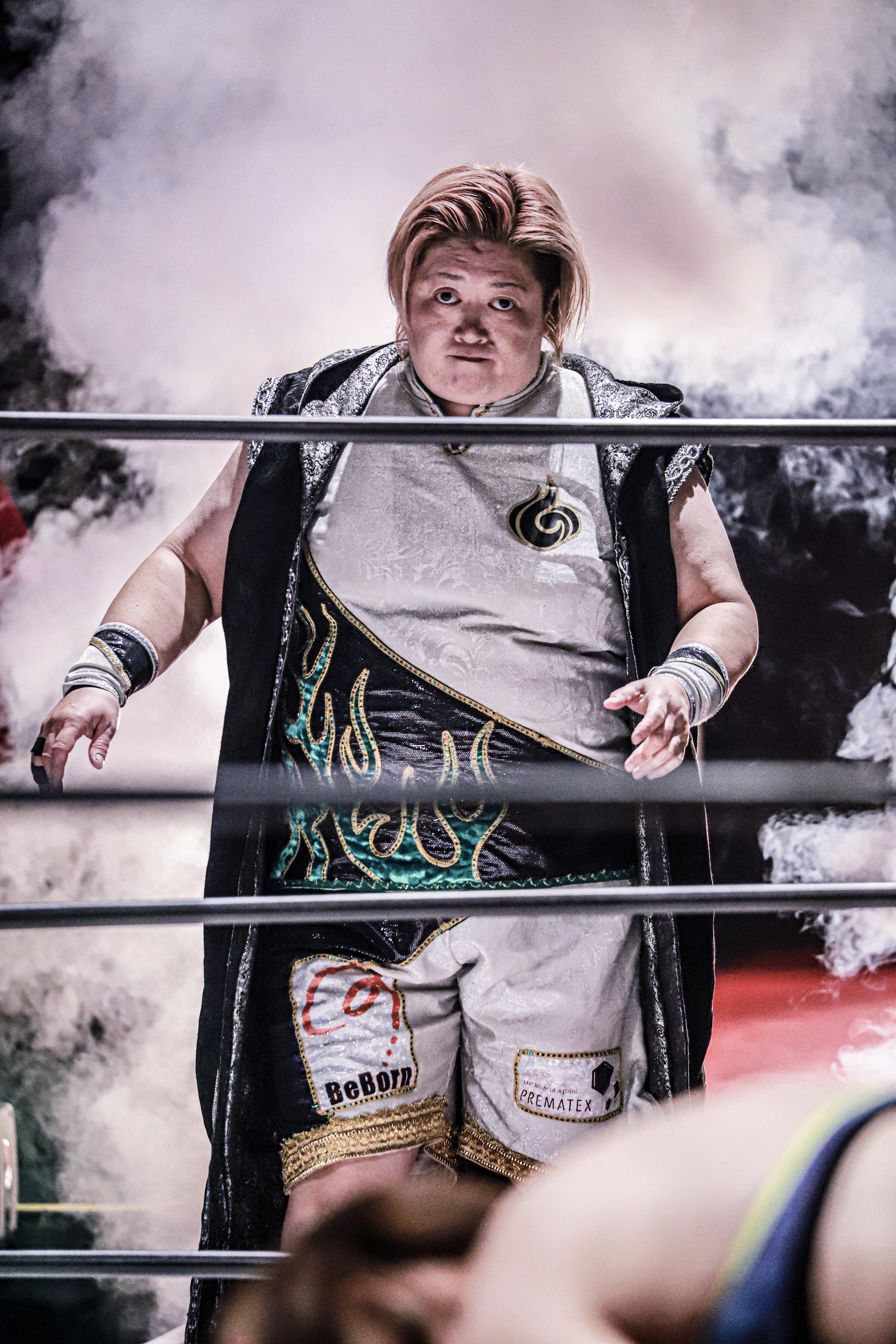
- Ito in November 2021

Personal information
- Born: October 20, 1971 (age 54) Kyoto, Japan

Professional wrestling career
- Ring name(s): Black Blizzard; Shinsei Mei; Makai Majo; Kaoru Ito; Devil #1; Zap I
- Billed height: 160 cm (5 ft 3 in)
- Billed weight: 108 kg (238 lb)
- Trained by: Jaguar Yokota
- Debut: 1989

Kaoru Ito (伊藤薫, Itō kaoru) is a Japanese professional wrestler and former mixed martial artist currently working as a freelancer and is best known for her tenure with the Japanese promotions All Japan Women's Pro-Wrestling and JWP Joshi Puroresu.

== Professional wrestling career ==
=== Japan (1989–present) ===
As a freelancer, Ito is known for competing in multiple promotions of the Japanese independent scene. At a house show promoted by Ladies Legend Pro-Wrestling on January 8, 2006, she teamed up with Kumiko Maekawa to unsuccessfully challenge Eagle Sawai and Noriyo Tateno for the LLPW Tag Team Championship. At Ice Ribbon's Icon Hottoriho on August 14, 2006, Ito teamed up with Ayako Sato and Cherry to defeat Aoi Kizuki, Kyoko Kimura and Yuri Urai. Ito participated in the Dantai Taikou Flash Tournament, an event promoted by Sendai Girls' Pro Wrestling on October 27, 2011, where she wrestled in two separate matches, the first round where she teamed up with Annie Social, Jenny Rose, Keiko Aono and Kyoko Inoue as Team Diana to defeat Team Freelance (Jaguar Yokota, Manami Toyota, Mio Shirai, Nancy Mari and Sakura Hirota). Ito teamed with Inoue and Sareee in the semi-finals where they fell short to Team Stardom (Nanae Takahashi, Natsuki Taiyo and Yoko Bito). At Seadlinnng Let's Make Miracle Year 2016 on January 11, Ito teamed up with Takako Inoue to defeat Aoi Kizuki and Yuki Miyazaki. At Bull Nakano Produce Empress, an independent show produced on January 8, 2012, Ito competed in a 21-woman battle royal won by Sakura Hirota and also involving notable opponents such as Dash Chisako, Hamuko Hoshi, Mayumi Ozaki, Shuu Shibutani, Sendai Sachiko and others. At WAVE NAMI 1, an event promoted by Pro Wrestling Wave on October 1, 2020, she teamed up with Haruka Umesaki, Misa Matsui and Miyuki Takase in a losing effort against Nagisa Nozaki, Sakura Hirota, Yuki Miyazaki and Yumi Ohka as a result of an eight-woman tag team match.

Ito often wrestled in men's promotions as a joshi talent. At NJPW Toukon Memorial Day 30th Anniversary, an event promoted by New Japan Pro Wrestling on May 2, 2002, Ito teamed up with Momoe Nakanishi to defeat Manami Toyota and Yumiko Hotta. At AAA Sin Limite, an event promoted by Lucha Libre AAA Worldwide on September 2, 2007, Ito teamed up with Mr. Niebla as La Legion Extranjera to unsuccessfully compete against La Legion Extranjera (Ayako Hamada and Kenzo Suzuki) and Faby Apache and Gran Apache in a three-way intergender tag team match. At ZERO1 Ekimae Festa 2019, an event promoted by Pro Wrestling Zero1 on March 16, 2019, she teamed up with Kyoko Inoue and Sareee to defeat Aja Kong, Rydeen Hagane and Takako Inoue by disqualification.

=== All Japan Women's Pro Wrestling (1990–2004) ===
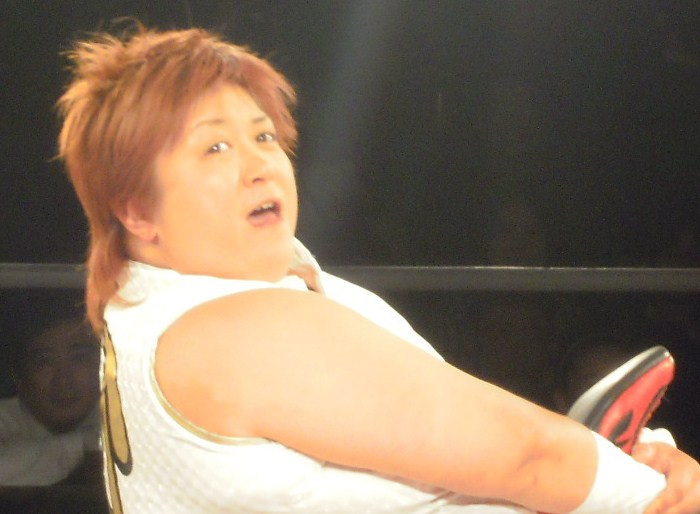
Ito competing for Oz Academy in July 2010.

Ito worked for most of her career and had the most notable accomplishments in All Japan Women's Pro Wrestling. She made her professional wrestling debut at a house show promoted on January 4, 1990, where she unsuccessfully challenged Mima Shimoda for the AJW Junior Championship.

She is known for competing in various of the promotion's signature events such as the Tag League the Best, making her first appearance at the 1992 edition where she teamed up with Miori Kamiya, fighting in a block also involving the teams of Erica Tsuchiya and Yukari Maedomari, Etsuko Mita and Mima Shimoda, Bat Yoshinaga and Tomoko Watanabe, Takako Inoue and Terri Power, Suzuka Minami and Yumiko Hotta, Debbie Malenko and Sakie Hasegawa, Manami Toyota and Toshiyo Yamada, and Aja Kong and Kyoko Inoue. She scored her best performances at the 1997 edition where she teamed up with Yumiko Hotta to compete against Miho Wakizawa and Miyuki Fujii, Kayo Noumi and Momoe Nakanishi, Emi Motokawa and Manami Toyota, and Kumiko Maekawa and Takako Inoue in the finals.

As for the Japan Grand Prix, she won the tournament on two separate occasions, first in 1997 by competing against Manami Toyota, Kumiko Maekawa, Etsuko Mita, Mima Shimoda, Tomoko Watanabe, Rie Tamada, Saa Endo, Misae Genki, Tanny Mouse, Yoshiko Tamura and Mariko Yoshida and scoring a leading sum of eighteen points. She scored the second victory at the 2000 edition where she defeated Reggie Bennett in the quarter-finals, Tomoko Watanabe in the semi-finals and Estuko Mita in the finals.

=== JWP Joshi Puroresu (1993–2016) ===
Ito made her first appearance in JWP Joshi Puroresu at JWP Thunder Queen Battle In Yokohama, an event promoted on July 31, 1993, where she teamed up with Suzuka Minami in a losing effort against Candy Okutsu and Devil Masami.

=== Oz Academy (2005–2017) ===
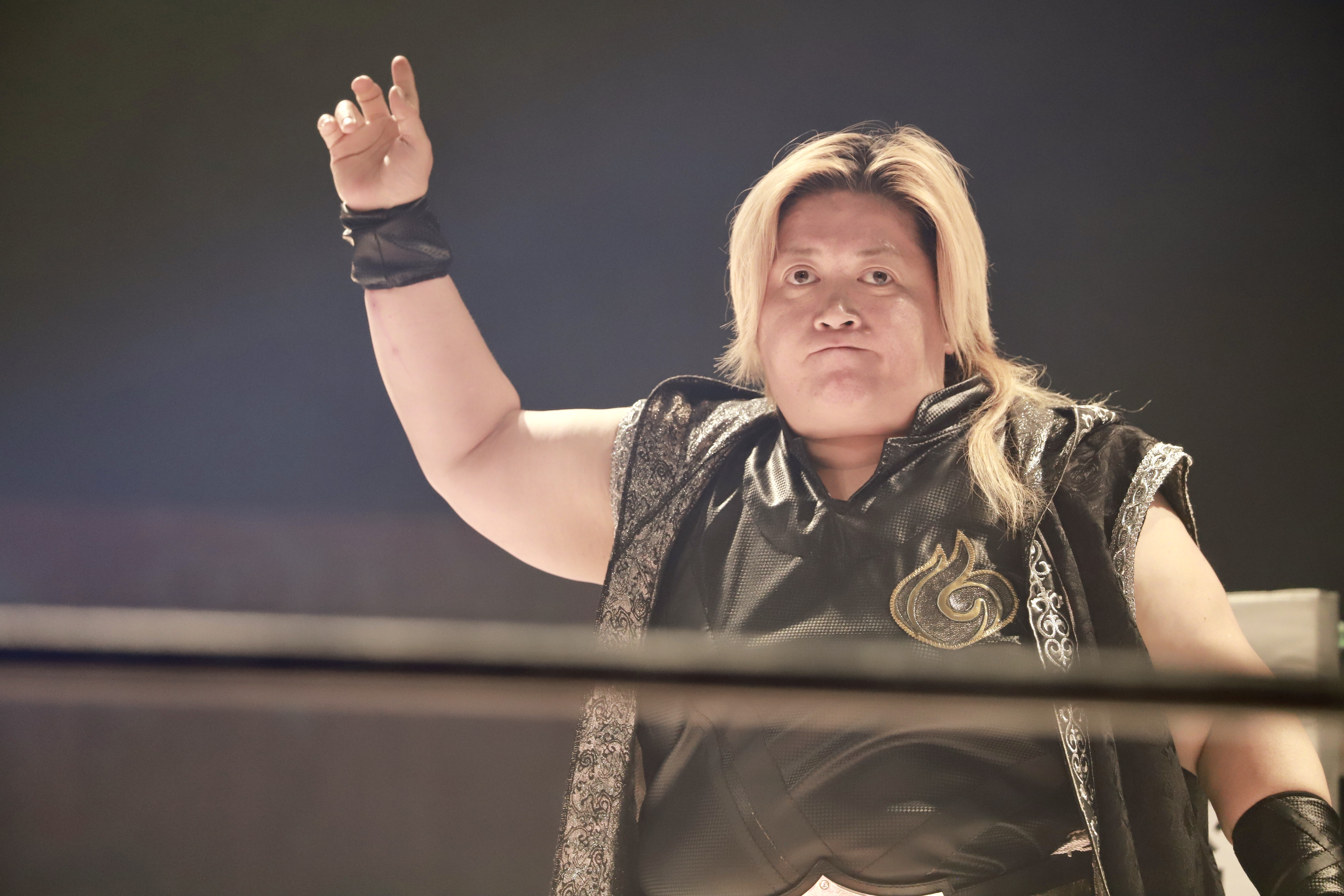
Ito in 2019

Another promotion for which Ito is known to have competed in though even briefly is Oz Academy. She made her first appearance at a house show promoted on June 26, 2005, where she teamed up with Aja Kong and Gran Hamada to defeat Dynamite Kansai, Macho Pump and Manami Toyota. At oz Academy Dream Girls on June 13, 2010, Ito teamed up with Aja Kong and defeated Oz Seikigun (Carlos Amano and Manami Toyota) to win the Oz Academy Tag Team Championship. At Manami Toyota 25th Anniversary on September 22, 2012, Ito competed in a 12-person battle royal won by Sakura Hirota and also involving Toyota herself alongside Command Bolshoi, Chikayo Nagashima, Gami, Sonoko Kato, Leon and others.

== Mixed martial arts record ==
Ito had a short-lived mixed martial arts career resuming at five fights (two victories and three defeats) spanning over five years.

Professional record breakdown
5 matches	2 wins	3 losses
By knockout	0	0
By submission	2	2
By decision	0	1

Res.	Record	Opponent	Method	Event	Date	Round	Time	Location	Notes
Loss	2-3	Mika Hayashi	Submission (armbar)	G-Shooto: Wrestle Expo 2006	August 19, 2006	1	3:13	Tokyo, Japan	
Win	2-2	Jung Hang-Suk	Submission (armlock)	Smackgirl - Korea 2005	May 21, 2005	1	1:32	Suwon, South Korea	
Win	1-2	Keiko Tamai	Submission (armbar)	Smackgirl - World ReMix 2004	December 19, 2004	1	3:45	Shizuoka, Japan	
Loss	0-2	Yoko Takahashi	Submission (Kimura)	Smackgirl - Yuuki Kondo Retirement Celebration	November 4, 2004	1	1:34	Tokyo, Japan	
Loss	0-1	Erin Toughill	Decision (unanimous)	W - Fusion	July 27, 2001	3	5:00	Tokyo, Japan	

== Championships and accomplishments ==
- All Japan Women's Pro-Wrestling
  - AJW Championship (2 time)
  - AJW Tag Team Championship (1 time) – with Sakie Hasegawa
  - WWWA World Single Championship (2 times)
  - WWWA World Tag Team Championship (1 time) - with Zap T
  - 1989 Rookie of the Year Decision Tournament
  - Japan Grand Prix (1997, 2000)
  - Tag League the Best (1997) – with Yumiko Hotta
- JWP Joshi Puroresu
  - JWP Tag Team Championship (2 times) – with Manami Toyota (1), and Zap T (1)
  - JWP Year-End Award (1 time)
    - Best Bout Award 2005 vs. Azumi Hyuga on May 15
- NEO Japan Ladies Pro-Wrestling
  - NEO Tag Team Championship (1 time) – with Ayako Hamada
- Oz Academy
  - Oz Academy Tag Team Championship (1 time) – with Aja Kong
- World Woman Pro-Wrestling Diana
  - WWWD World Championship (2 times)
  - WWWD Tag Team Championship (3 times) – with Kyoko Inoue (1) and Tomoko Watanabe (2)
- Tokyo Sports
  - Women's Wrestling Grand Prize (2001)

== Luchas de Apuestas record ==
Winner (wager)	Loser (wager)	Location	Event	Date	Notes
Kaoru Ito (hair)	Yumiko Hotta (hair)	Kawasaki, Kanagawa, Japan	AJW Winning Hit ~ The Year-End Big Rumble ~	December 16, 2001	
