= AJW Tag Team Championship =

Professional wrestling women's tag team championship

Details
- Promotion: All Japan Women's Pro-Wrestling
- Date established: February 15, 1986
- Date retired: April 2005
Statistics
- First champions: The Red Typhoons (Kazue Nagahori and Yumi Ogura)
- Final champions: Takako Inoue and Tomoko Watanabe
- Most reigns: Kayo Noumi and Miho Wakizawa (3 times)

The AJW Tag Team Championship was the secondary tag team title in the Japanese professional wrestling promotion All Japan Women's Pro-Wrestling. The title was introduced in 1986 and was retired in April 2005 when the promotion closed. There have been a total of thirty-four reigns shared between twenty-seven teams consisting of forty-nine distinctive champions and eleven vacancies.

== Title history ==
Key
No.	Overall reign number
Reign	Reign number for the specific team—reign numbers for the individuals are in parentheses, if different
Days	Number of days held

No.	Champion	Championship change			Reign statistics		Notes	Ref.
No.	Champion	Date	Event	Location	Reign	Days	Notes	Ref.
1	The Red Typhoons (Kazue Nagahori and Yumi Ogura)	February 15, 1986	N/A	Kawasaki, Kanagawa, Japan	1	126	The Red Typhoons defeated Bull Nakano and Condor Saito to become the inaugural champions.	
2	Kanako Nagatomo and Mika Komatsu (Operon Alliance)	June 21, 1986	N/A	Tokyo, Japan	1	139		
3	The Red Typhoons (Kazue Nagahori and Yumi Ogura)	November 7, 1986	N/A	Osaka, Japan	2	171		
—	Vacated	April 27, 1987	Live Event	Tokyo, Japan	—	—	The Red Typhoons (Kazue Nagahori and Yumi Ogura) vacated the championship after winning the WWWA World Tag Team Championship.	
4	Drill Nakamae and Kumiko Iwamoto	June 28, 1987	N/A	Tokyo, Japan	1	(Note: The exact date that Drill Nakamae and Kumiko Iwamoto vacated the championship is unknown, meaning the reign lasted between 247 and 277 days.)	Iwamoto and Nakamae defeated Kyoko Asoh and Mitsuko Nishiwaki to win the vacant championship.	
—	Vacated	March 1988	—	—	—	—	The championship was vacated for undocumented reasons.	
5	Erika Shishido and Nobuko Kimura	April 2, 1988	N/A	Yokohama, Kanagawa, Japan	1	191	Kimura and Shishido defeated The Honey Wings (Kaoru Maeda and Mika Takahashi) in a tournament final to win the vacant championship.	
6	The Honey Wings (Kaoru Maeda and Mika Takahashi)	October 10, 1988	N/A	Tokyo, Japan	1	145		
7	Miori Kamiya and Reibun Amada	March 4, 1989	N/A	Tokyo, Japan	1	102		
8	Dream Orca (Etsuko Mita and Toshiyo Yamada)	June 14, 1989	N/A	Tokyo, Japan	1	274		
—	Vacated	March 15, 1990	—	—	—	—	The championship was vacated after Toshiyo Yamada suffered an injury.	
9	The Honey Wings (Kaoru Maeda and Mika Takahashi)	June 1, 1990	N/A	Kawachi, Osaka, Japan	2	166	The Honey Wings defeated The Sweet Hearts (Manami Toyota and Mima Shimoda) to win the vacant championship.	
10	Etsuko Mita and Mima Shimoda	November 14, 1990	Wrestlemarinepiad	Yokohama, Kanagawa, Japan	1	158		
11	Cynthia Moreno and Esther Moreno	April 21, 1991	Live event	Tokyo, Japan	1	103		
12	Mariko Yoshida and Takako Inoue	August 2, 1991	AJW on Fuji TV	Tokyo, Japan	1	156		
13	Debbie Malenko and Sakie Hasegawa	January 5, 1992	Live event	Tokyo, Japan	1	111		
14	Mariko Yoshida and Takako Inoue	April 25, 1992	Wrestlemarinepiad	Yokohama, Kanagawa, Japan	2	232		
15	Bat Yoshinaga and Tomoko Watanabe	December 13, 1992	N/A	Tokyo, Japan	1	132		
16	Kaoru Ito and Sakie Hasegawa (2)	April 24, 1993	AJW on Fuji TV	Masuda, Shimane, Japan	1	226		
17	Miki Handa and Yasha Kurenai	December 6, 1993	N/A	Tokyo, Japan	1	295		
18	Carol Midori and Michiko Omukai	September 27, 1994	LLPW live event	Osaka, Japan	1	171		
19	Mariko Yoshida (3) and Rie Tamada	March 17, 1995	N/A	Tokyo, Japan	1	(Note: The exact date that Mariko Yoshida and Rie Tamada vacated the championship is unknown, meaning the reign lasted between 106 and 136 days.)		
—	Vacated	July 1995	—	—	—	—	The championship was vacated for undocumented reasons.	
20	Chaparita ASARI and Kumiko Maekawa	September 2, 1995	N/A	Tokyo, Japan	1	(Note: The exact date that Chaparita Asari and Kumiko Maekawa vacated the championship is unknown, meaning the reign lasted between 29 and 59 days.)	Asari and Maekawa defeated Rie Tamada and Yumi Fukawa to win the vacant championship.	
—	Vacated	October 1995	—	—	—	—	The championship was vacated for undocumented reasons.	
21	Rie Tamada (2) and Yumi Fukawa	December 4, 1995	N/A	Tokyo, Japan	1	272	The team that Fukawa and Tamada defeated to win the vacant championship is unknown.	
22	Oz Academy (Chikayo Nagashima and Sugar Sato)	September 1, 1996	The Rising Generation Queens Carnival	Tokyo, Japan	1	385		
—	Vacated	September 21, 1997	—	Kawasaki, Kanagawa, Japan	—	—	The championship was vacated after Chikayo Nagashima suffered an injury.	
23	Momoe Nakanishi and Nanae Takahashi	November 23, 1997	Nagoya Super Whirlwind	Nagoya, Aichi, Japan	1	110	Nakanishi and Takahashi defeated Emi Motokawa and Sari Osumi to win the vacant champion.	
24	Kayo Noumi and Miho Wakizawa	March 13, 1998	New Year Zenjo "VOW" - Day 34	Osaka, Japan	1	(Note: The exact date that Kayo Noumi and Miho Wakizawa vacated the championship is unknown, meaning the reign lasted between 110 and 140 days.)		
—	Vacated	July 1998	—	—	—	—	The championship was vacated after Kayo Noumi suffered a broken leg.	
25	Momoe Nakanishi and Nanae Takahashi	August 23, 1998	N/A	Kawasaki, Kanagawa, Japan	2	48	Nakanishi and Takahashi defeated Megumi Yabushita and Sumie Sakai to win the vacant championship.	
—	Vacated	October 10, 1998	—	Tokyo, Japan	—	—	Momoe Nakanishi and Nanae Takahashi vacated the championship to pursue the WWWA World Tag Team Championship.	
26	Sumie Sakai and Yuko Kosugi	November 10, 1998	N/A	Tokyo, Japan	1	19	Kosugi and Sakai defeated Kayo Noumi and Miho Wakizawa to win the vacant championship.	
27	Kayo Noumi and Miho Wakizawa	November 29, 1998	AJW 30th Anniversary Show	Yokohama, Kanagawa, Japan	2	223		
28	Kana Misaki and Tsubasa Kuragaki	July 10, 1999	Odaiba W Explosion - Day 1	Tokyo, Japan	1	307		
29	Kayo Noumi and Miho Wakizawa	May 12, 2000	Zenjo Mania	Sapporo, Hokkaido, Japan	3	(Note: The length of the championship reign is too uncertain to calculate.)		
—	Vacated	2001	—	—	—	—	The championship was vacated due to Miho Wakizawa's retirement.	
30	Kaori Yoneyama and Kayoko Haruyama	July 20, 2002	N/A	Saitama, Japan	1	213	Haruyama and Yoneyama defeated Mika Nishio and Miyuki Fujii to win the vacant championship.	
—	Vacated	February 18, 2003	—	—	—	—	The championship was vacated for undocumented reasons.	
31	Hikaru and Mika Nishio	March 21, 2003	The Road of Women's Pro Wrestling - Day 26	Tokyo, Japan	1	(Note: The exact date that the championship was vacated is unknown, meaning the reign lasted between 102 and 132 days.)	Hikaru and Nishio defeated Miyuki Fujii and Saki Maemura to win the vacant championship.	
—	Vacated	July 2003	—	—	—	—	The championship was vacated for undocumented reasons.	
32	Kaori Yoneyama (2) and Saki Maemura	January 4, 2004	N/A	Tokyo, Japan	1	263	Maemura and Yoneyama defeated Haruka Matsuo and Hikaru to win the vacant championship.	
33	NEO Machine Guns (Tanny Mouse and Yuki Miyazaki)	September 23, 2004	Rising Generation - Day 1	Tokyo, Japan	1	13		
34	Takako Inoue (3) and Tomoko Watanabe (2)	October 6, 2004	Rising Generation - Day 4	Tokyo, Japan	1	(Note: The exact date that the championship was vacated is unknown, meaning the reign lasted between 177 and 206 days.)		
—	Deactivated	April 2005	—	—	—	—	The championship retired when AJW closed.	

== Combined reigns ==
¤	The exact length of a title reign is uncertain; the combined length may not be correct.

=== By team ===
Rank	Team	No. of reigns	Combined days
1	Mariko Yoshida and Takako Inoue	2	388
2	Oz Academy (Chikayo Nagashima and Sugar Sato)	1	385
3	Kayo Noumi and Miho Wakizawa	3	333 – 363¤
4	The Honey Wings (Kaoru Maeda and Mika Takahashi)	2	311
5	Kana Misaki and Tsubasa Kuragaki	1	307
6	The Red Typhoons (Kazue Nagahori and Yumi Ogura)	2	297
7	Miki Handa and Yasha Kurenai	1	295
8	Dream Orca (Etsuko Mita and Toshiyo Yamada)	1	274
9	Rie Tamada and Yumi Fukawa	1	272
10	Kaori Yoneyama and Saki Maemura	1	263
11	Drill Nakamae and Kumiko Iwamoto	1	244 – 277¤
12	Kaoru Ito and Sakie Hasegawa	1	226
13	Kaori Yoneyama and Kayoko Haruyama	1	213
14	Erika Shishido and Nobuko Kimura	1	191
15	Carol Midori and Michiko Omukai	1	171
16	Erika Shishido and Mima Shimoda	1	158
16	Momoe Nakanishi and Nanae Takahashi	2	158
18	Kanako Nagatomo and Mika Komatsu	1	139
19	Bat Yoshinaga and Tomoko Watanabe	1	132
20	Debbie Malenko and Sakie Hasegawa	1	111
21	Mariko Yoshida and Rie Tamada	1	103 – 136¤
22	Cynthia Moreno and Esther Moreno	1	103
23	Hikaru and Mika Nishio	1	102 – 132¤
23	Miori Kamiya and Reibun Amada	1	102
25	Chaparita ASARI and Kumiko Maekawa	1	29 – 59¤
26	Sumie Sakai and Yuko Kosugi	1	19
27	NEO Machine Guns (Tanny Mouse and Yuki Miyazaki)	1	13

=== By wrestler ===
Rank	Wrestler	No. of reigns	Combined days
1	Takako Inoue	3	565 – 594¤
2	Mariko Yoshida	3	494 – 524¤
3	Kaori Yoneyama	2	476
4	Chikayo Nagashima	1	385
4	Sugar Sato	1	385
6	Rie Tamada	2	378 – 408¤
7	Erika Shishido	2	349
8	Sakie Hasegawa	2	337
9	Kayo Noumi	3	333 – 363¤
9	Miho Wakizawa	3	333 – 363¤
11	Kaoru Maeda	2	311
11	Mika Takahashi	2	311
13	Tomoko Watanabe	2	309 – 338¤
14	Kana Misaki	1	307
14	Tsubasa Kuragaki	1	307
16	Kazue Nagahori	2	297
16	Yumi Ogura	2	297
18	Miki Handa	1	295
18	Yasha Kurenai	1	295
20	Etsuko Mita	1	274
20	Toshiyo Yamada	1	274
22	Yumi Fukawa	1	272
23	Saki Maemura	1	263
24	Drill Nakamae	1	244 – 277¤
24	Kumiko Iwamoto	1	244 – 277¤
26	Kaoru Ito	1	226
27	Kayoko Haruyama	1	213
28	Nobuko Kimura	1	191
29	Carol Midori	1	171
29	Michiko Omukai	1	171
31	Mima Shimoda	1	158
31	Momoe Nakanishi	2	158
31	Nanae Takahashi	2	158
34	Kanako Nagatomo	1	139
34	Mika Komatsu	1	139
36	Bat Yoshinaga	1	132
37	Debbie Malenko	1	111
38	Cynthia Moreno	1	103
38	Esther Moreno	1	103
40	Hikaru	1	102 – 132¤
40	Mika Nishio	1	102 – 132¤
40	Miori Kamiya	1	102
40	Reibun Amada	1	102
44	Chaparita ASARI	1	29 – 59¤
44	Kumiko Maekawa	1	29 – 59¤
46	Sumie Sakai	1	19
46	Yuko Kosugi	1	19
48	Tanny Mouse	1	13
48	Yuki Miyazaki	1	13

== See also ==
- List of professional wrestling promotions in Japan
- List of women's wrestling promotions
- Professional wrestling in Japan
