= UWA World Women's Tag Team Championship =

Professional wrestling women's tag team championship

Details
- Promotion: Universal Wrestling Association; Japanese Independent circuit
- Date established: January 19, 1992
- Date retired: 2003
Statistics
- First champion(s): Manami Toyota and Toshiyo Yamada
- Final champion(s): Etsuko Mita and Mima Shimoda
- Most reigns: Etsuko Mita and Mima Shimoda (2 times)

The UWA World Women's Tag Team Championship (in Japanese: UWA世界女子タッグ王座) was a professional wrestling tag team title defended in the Universal Wrestling Association (UWA) from 1992 to 1995, then revived in 2001. It was the primary female wrestling tag team title in the promotion and was defended in both Mexico and Japan. The belts themselves were brought back in 2001 when the previous champions Etsuko Mita and Mima Shimoda won them in tournament on the Japanese Independent circuit, but the belts have not been defended since the tournament.

As it was a professional wrestling championship, the championship was not won not by actual competition, but by a scripted ending to a match determined by the bookers and match makers. (Note: Hornbaker (2016) p. 550: "Professional wrestling is a sport in which match finishes are predetermined. Thus, win–loss records are not indicative of a wrestler's genuine success based on their legitimate abilities – but on now much, or how little they were pushed by promoters") On occasion the promotion declares a championship vacant, which means there is no champion at that point in time. This can either be due to a storyline, (Note: Duncan & Will (2000) p. 271, Chapter: Texas: NWA American Tag Team Title [World Class, Adkisson] "Championship held up and rematch ordered because of the interference of manager Gary Hart") or real life issues such as a champion suffering an injury being unable to defend the championship, (Note: Duncan & Will (2000) p. 20, Chapter: (United States: 19th Century & widely defended titles – NWA, WWF, AWA, IW, ECW, NWA) NWA/WCW TV Title "Rhodes stripped on 85/10/19 for not defending the belt after having his leg broken by Ric Flair and Ole & Arn Anderson") or leaving the company. (Note: Duncan & Will (2000) p. 201, Chapter: (Memphis, Nashville) Memphis: USWA Tag Team Title "Vacant on 93/01/18 when Spike leaves the USWA.")

== Title history ==
Key
No.	Overall reign number
Reign	Reign number for the specific champion
Days	Number of days held

No.	Champion	Championship change			Reign statistics		Notes	Ref.
No.	Champion	Date	Event	Location	Reign	Days	Notes	Ref.
1	Manami Toyota and Toshiyo Yamada	January 19, 1992	Live event	Tokyo, Japan	1	(Note: The exact date the championship was vacated has not been documented, which means that Toyota and Yamada's title reign lasted between 57 days and 594 days.)	Defeated Lady Apache and KAORU to become the first champions.	(Note: Duncan & Will (2000) p. 399, Chapter: MEXICO: UWA World Women's Tag Team Title [Flores, Mora])
—	Vacated	1993	—	—	—	—	Championship vacated for undocumented reasons.	
2	Yumiko Hotta and Takako Inoue	September 5, 1993	Live event	Tokyo, Japan	1	206	Defeated Akira Hokuto and Suzuka Minami to win the vacant titles.	
3	Las Cachorras Orientales; Etsuko Mita and Mima Shimoda	March 30, 1994	Live event	Naha, Japan	1	521		
—	Vacated	September 2, 1995	—	—	—	—	Titles vacated and abandoned shortly afterwards.	
4	Las Cachorras Orientales; Etsuko Mita and Mima Shimoda	November 15, 2001	Live event	Chiba, Japan	2	1	Defeated Rie Tamada and GAMI to win the titles following its revival.	
—	Deactivated	N/A N/A, 2003	—	—	—	—	The championship deactivated somewhere in year 2003.	

== See also ==
- Women's World Tag Team Championship
