= Toshiyo Yamada =

Japanese professional wrestler

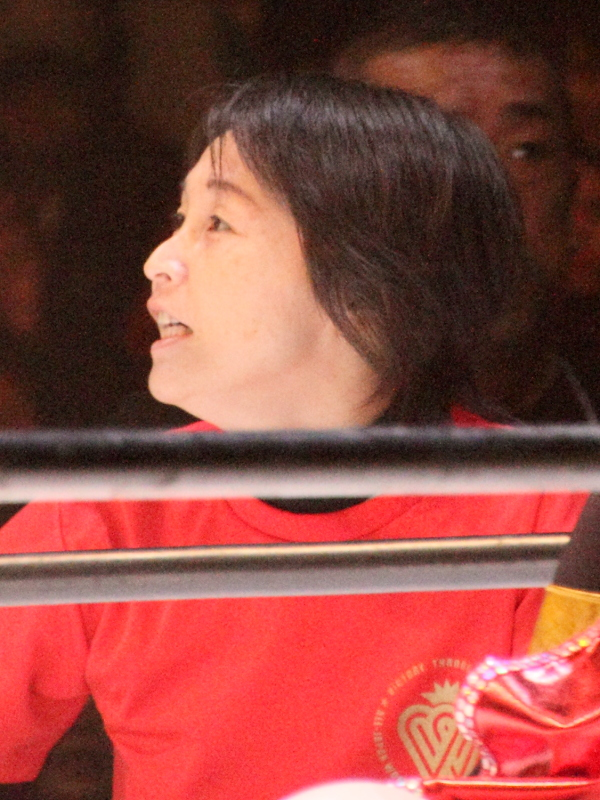
- Yamada in March 2014.

Personal information
- Born: February 27, 1970 (age 56) Saitama, Saitama

Professional wrestling career
- Billed height: 1.68 m (5 ft 6 in)
- Billed weight: 70 kg (154 lb)
- Trained by: Jaguar Yokota
- Debut: 1987
- Retired: 2004

Toshiyo Yamada (山田 敏代, Yamada Toshiyo; born February 27, 1970) is a Japanese retired professional wrestler. In the 1990s, Yamada wrestled for the All Japan Women's Pro-Wrestling promotion (AJW).

== Professional wrestling career ==
=== All Japan Women's Pro-Wrestling ===
==== Early Career and Dream Orca (1987–1992) ====
Toshiyo Yamada part of the 1987 All Japan Women's Pro-Wrestling (AJW)'s rookie class which also featured Manami Toyota, Etsuko Mita and Mima Shimoda. Yamada debuted on July 27, 1987 against Chiaki Ichikawa. On June 21, 1987, Yamada earned a silver medal in the 70 kg class at the All Japan Wrestling Championship. Yamada later won the 1987 All Japan Women's Rookie of the Year tournament.

On July 19, 1988, she captured the AJW Junior Championship in a tournament final against Miori Kamiya. By August 1988, she formed "Dream Orca" with Etsuko Mita. On August 25, 1988, she successfully defended her AJW Junior Championship against Sachiko Nakamura. During September and October 1988, she teamed up with Manami Toyota to compete in Tag League the Best 1988. The team came in 6th place, ahead of many wrestlers with similar levels of experience.

On May 6, 1989 at Wrestle Marinepiad '89, Dream Orca were defeated by the "Tokyo Sweethearts" of Mima Shimoda and Manami Toyota. On June 14, 1989, Dream Orca captured the AJW Tag Team Championship from Reibun Amada and Miori Kamiya. In July 1989, they successfully defended the titles against the "Honey Wings" of Mika Takahashi and Kaoru Maeda. During August 1989, she fought in a kickboxing bout against Anna Maria Delgado. Yamada also competed in the 1989 Japan Grand Prix, but was defeated by her second round opponent, Sakie Hasegawa. On December 9, she challenged for Manami Toyota's AJW Championship. While Toyota won, this match was deemed worthy enough to be a sole feature on a VHS tape entitled AJW Best Bout New Future Struggle. On January 5, 1990, Yamada met Yumiko Hotta in a kickboxing match.

In March 1990, Yamada had a cervical hernia which forced Dream Orca to vacate their AJW Tag Team Championship and forced Yamada to temporarily retire. Yamada did not return until December 1990. Yamada spent most of the first half of 1991 competing in midcard matches, frequently against Yumiko Hotta. During July and August 1991, Yamada competed in the 1991 Japan Grand Prix. Yamada defeated Miori Kamiya in the first round but was defeated by Kyoko Inoue in the second round on August 18, 1991. Yamada and Kyoko Inoue toured Mexico in 1991. The two continued to team up afterwards and on December 8, 1991 won Tag League the Best 1991, defeating Jungle Jack of Aja Kong and Bison Kimura in the finals. This was the biggest win of Yamada's career up until that point. Yamada also started to develop a rivalry with Manami Toyota during this period.

On January 4, 1992, Yamada wrestled Toyota to a 30 minute draw. They were given 5 additional minutes but at the end of 5 minutes, no winner was decided. They were then given another 5 minutes, but no winner could be determined. The crowd chanted "Zenjo"(the nickname for All Japan Women's) during the match. The next day on January 5, a Tag League the Best rematch was held with Inoue and Yamada challenging for Kong and Kimura's WWWA tag titles. This time, Kong and Kimura would get the win. January 1992 would not be over for Yamada however, as on the 19th, she paired with rival Manami Toyota to capture the newly created UWA World Women's Tag Team Championship, becoming the first champions. The team defeated Lady Apache and Kaoru. The team would eventually become known as the "1987 Team Gold Combo".

==== Teaming with Toyota (1992–1997) ====
On March 20, 1992, at AJW St. Battle Day, Yamada and Toyota put their UWA Tag Titles up for grabs against Jungle Jack's (Aja Kong and Bison Kimura) WWWA Tag Titles in a rare 2/3 falls title vs title match. Yamada and Toyota scored a major upset, becoming double champions. On April 25, 1992, after taking Bison Kimura's WWWA Tag Titles, she wrestled Kimura in a singles match at AJW Wrestle Marinepiad 1992 for Bison's All Pacific Championship. Kimura retained her title. From June to August 1992, Yamada competed in the 20 person 1992 Japan Grand Prix. Yamada had another match with tag partner and rival Manami Toyota and made it to the semifinals, where was defeated by Aja Kong. On June 27, 1992, Yamada and Toyota successfully defended their WWWA Tag Titles against Akira Hokuto and Kyoko Inoue. The team defended the titles again successfully against Aja Kong and Kyoko Inoue on July 15. Yaamda was also involved in the Fuji TV Mid-Summer Typhoon Tag Tournament from July to August 1992. She teamed with Akira Hokuto. The team went against Mariko Yoshida and Sakie Hasegawa. Hasegawa was injured early and Hokuto used a kendo stick on their opponents. Yamada and Hokuto argued about this and then Hokuto attacked Yamada as well.

AJW Mid Summer Typhoon on August 15, was an important date in Yamada's career. Yamada had two matches scheduled. The first match was the finals of the Fuji TV Mid-Summer Typhoon tournament. This pit Hokuto and Yamada together against Bull Nakano and Aja Kong, after their incident earlier in the tournament. Before the match even started, Hokuto again attacked Yamada and the two argued about using the kendo stick again all throughout the match. Yamada and Hokuto lost. Yamada's second match of the night featured her facing off against a fresh Manami Toyota for the IWA World Women's Championship in a hair vs hair match. The highly rated match would become one of the more memorable joshi matches ever with Toyota defeating Yamada. After the match, Toyota cried and tried to prevent the hair cut and even cut some of her own hair in protest. The two hugged after the match while the crowd chanted. From October to December 1992, Yamada and Toyota teamed up for Tag League the Best 1992. The team finished in second place. On November 26, at Dreamrush, the precursor to Dreamslam 1 and 2, Yamada and Toyota defended their WWWA titles against the JWP team of Dynamite Kansai and Mayumi Ozaki in a 2 out of 3 falls match. The highly-rated match ended in a somewhat controversial finish as Ozaki appeared to get her shoulder up in time before the 3 count.

On February 28, 1993, Yamada and Toyota successfully defended their WWWA Tag Titles against Yumiko Hotta and Takako Inoue in a 2 out of 3 falls match. On April 2, one of the most famous joshi events ever was held at All Star Dreamslam 1, which celebrated All Japan Women's 25th anniversary. The main event featured Yamada and Toyota taking on the FMW team of Combat Toyoda and Megumi Kudo, who both graduated from the AJW Dojo. On April 11, Dreamslam 2 was held. This event featured the second match in the feud between the team of Yamada and Toyota and the JWP team of Dynamite Kansai and Mayumi Ozaki. It was a 2/3 falls match for the WWWA tag titles, where Kansai and Ozaki won, getting their revenge for their loss at Dreamrush. The highly-rated match was the 1993 Wrestling Observer Match of the Year. From May to August 1993, Yamada entered the 1993 Japan Grand Prix and came in 6th place. On October 9, the feud between Yamada, Toyota and Kansai and Ozaki continued on as Kansai beat Yamada in a singles match while Toyota defeated Ozaki in a singles match. From October to December 1993, Yamada revived her team with Kyoko Inoue for Tag League the Best 1993. The team made it to the finals, but lost to Manami Toyota and Akira Hokuto. On November 28, at AJW Wrestling Queendom, Yamada faced off with Toyota again, this time for the All Pacific Championship. Yamada won the title. On December 6, at AJW St. Battle Final, the third and final match was held between the JWP team of Kansai and Ozaki and the AJW team of Yamada and Toyota for the WWWA Tag Titles. Yamada and Toyota regained the titles in an often underlooked match in the series.

On January 4, 1994, the team defeated "Double Inoue" of Kyoko Inoue and Takako Inoue and on January 24, Yamada and Toyota defended their WWWA Tag Titles successfully against Las Cachorras Orientales. The team then made another successful defense of their titles on February 27, against Aja Kong and Sakie Hasegawa. On March 27, at Yokohoma Wrestling Queendom, Yamada lost her All Pacific Championship to Kyoko Inoue. On June 10, 1994, Yamada and Toyota successfully defended their WWWA Tag Titles against Sakie Hasegawa and Kaoru Ito. During the 1994 Japan Grand Prix from June to August 1994, Toyota and Yamada met again in a singles match while Yamada finished the tournament in 4th place.

For Tag League the Best 1994, Yamada teamed with Yumiko Hotta, while Toyota's team with Takako Inoue won the tournament. On October 9, Yamada and Toyota lost their WWWA Tag Titles to Double Inoue (Kyoko Inoue and Takako Inoue). Yamada started to take on a lesser role in the company and was moved down the cards. On November 20, Yamada competed at Big Egg Wrestling Universe with Tomoko Watanabe in a losing effort against LLPW's Shinobu Kandori and Mikiko Futagami. In December Yamada's Tag League the Best 1994 team with Yumiko Hotta finished in 5th place. To close out the year, Yamada teamed with Dream Orca partner and one half of LCO, Etsuko Mita against Toyota and her Tokyo Sweethearts partner and half of LCO, Mima Shimoda.

On March 26, 1995, Yamada regained her All Pacific Championship at AJW Wrestling Queendom Victory. On July 31, 1995, Yamada and Toyota matched up again in the 1995 Japan Grand Prix. Yamada also revived Dream Orca for Tag League the Best 1995. Yamada then lost her All Pacific Championship to Yumiko Hotta at AJW Monday Night Sensation on December 4, 1995. On July 13, 1997, Yamada had her last match with All Japan Women's, squaring off against partner and rival, Manami Toyota. Toyota won. During this time, All Japan Women's was going through bankruptcy, losing 14 wrestlers through summer and fall of 1997.

==== Gaea and retirement (1997–2004) ====
On July 21, 1997, Yamada became a full-time member of Gaea Japan, where she wrestled until December 2004. She hurt her cervical spine in August 2004 and was unable to wrestle again. On December 12, 2004 at the Toshiyo Yamada Retirement Memorial Show, Manami Toyota and Etsuko Mita went to a 10 minute draw in an exhibition match in her honor.

== Personal life ==
Yamada ran a bar in Yoyogi-Uehara, Tokyo until 2013.

== Championships and accomplishments ==
- All Japan Women's Pro-Wrestling
  - AJW Junior Championship (1 time)
  - All Pacific Championship (2 times)
  - AJW Tag Team Championship (1 time) - with Etsuko Mita
  - WWWA World Tag Team Championship (2 times) - with Manami Toyota
  - 1987 Rookie of the Year Decision Tournament
  - Tag League the Best (1991) – with Kyoko Inoue
- Universal Wrestling Association
  - UWA World Women's Tag Team Championship
- Wrestling Observer Newsletter
  - Match of the Year (1993) with Manami Toyota vs. Dynamite Kansai and Mayumi Ozaki on April 11, Dream Slam II, Osaka

== Luchas de Apuestas record ==
Winner (wager)	Loser (wager)	Location	Event	Date	Notes
Manami Toyota (hair)	Toshiyo Yamada (hair)	Korakuen Hall - Tokyo, Japan	AJW Mid Summer Typhoon	August 15, 1992	
