= Cynthia Moreno =

Mexican professional wrestler (born 1970)

Personal information
- Born: Flavia Antonia Moreno León; July 23, 1970 (age 56) Mexico City, Mexico
- Parent: Alfonso Moreno (father)
- Relatives: El Oriental (brother); Esther Moreno (sister); Alda Moreno (sister); Rossy Moreno (sister); El Hijo de Dr. Wagner Jr. (nephew); El Galeno del Mal (nephew)

Professional wrestling career
- Ring name(s): Cynthia Moreno; Cinthia Moreno
- Billed height: 1.66 m (5 ft 5 1/2 in)
- Billed weight: 69 kg (152 lb)
- Trained by: Pepe Casas; Negro Casas; Blue Panther; Alfonso Moreno
- Debut: 1987

Flavia Antonia Moreno León (born July 23, 1970) is a Mexican professional wrestler, best known under the ring name Cynthia Moreno (sometimes spelled "Cinthia Moreno") She is working for Lucha Libre AAA Worldwide (AAA). Moreno is a part of an extended professional wrestling family that includes her father Alfonso Moreno, her brother who wrestles as El Oriental and her sisters, Esther, Alda, and Rossy Moreno. She is a former two-time holder of the AAA World Mixed Tag Team Championship with her brother El Oriental.

== Professional wrestling career ==
=== Consejo Mundial de Lucha Libre (1987–1997) ===
Flavia Antonia Moreno León is the daughter of Alfonso "Acorazado" (Spanish for "Battleship") Moreno and was trained by her father as well as by Pepe Casas for her professional wrestling career. She made her debut in 1987 in Arena Azteca Budoka in Nezahualcoyotl, Mexico State, the building her father promoted at the time, under the name Cynthia Moreno.

=== All Japan Women's Pro-Wrestling (early 1990s) ===
In the early 1990s Cynthia and her sister Esther Moreno travelled to Japan to wrestle for All Japan Women's Pro-Wrestling. On April 21, 1991, the Moreno sisters defeated Etsuko Mita and Mima Shimoda to win the AJW Tag Team Championship, making them the first Mexican team to hold a championship in Mexico. They would hold the titles until August 2, 1991 where they lost the title to Takako Inoue and Mariko Yoshida. After returning to Mexico she began working for Consejo Mundial de Lucha Libre (CMLL), occasionally touring in Japan.

=== Lucha Libre AAA (1997–2014) ===
In 1997, she left CMLL to work for Lucha Libre AAA Worldwide (AAA) along with her sisters Esther, Alda and Rossy. She made her first pay-per-view appearance for AAA as Cynthia, Alda and Esther Moreno lost to the team of their sister Rossy, Xóchitl Hamada and Miss Janeth as part of the 1999 Verano de Escandalo. At the 1999 Guerra de Titanes event Cinthia and Alda teamed up with Faby Apache to defeat Rossy, Miss Janeth and Tiffany. She participated in the 2000 Reina de Reinas tournament, but was defeated in the semi-final by Xochitl Hamada. The following year she competed in the Reina de Reinas tournament once again, but was unable to make it past the semi-final match.

At the 2003 Guerra de Titanes, Moreno, El Oriental, Mascarita Sagrada and Pimpinela Escarlata defeated Faby Apache, Gran Apache, Mini Abismo Negro and Polvo de Estrellas in a Relevos Atómicos de locura match (Spanish for "Eight-man madness match"), a match that featured two teams of four, each composed of a male wrestler, a female wrestler, an Exotico wrestler, and a Mini-Estrella. In May 2004 she travelled Japan to wrestle for Hustle's HUSTLE-3 show, teaming with Mascarita Sagrada and Oscar Sevilla and Pimpinela Escarlata to defeat Faby Apache, Gran Apache, Mini Abismo Negro and Polvo de Estrellas. The following month she wrestled on her first Triplemanía event as she wrestled during Triplemanía XII, repeating the match she had participated in at HUSTLE-3 with the same results. In mid-2004 Cynthia started a storyline feud with the Apache family, primarily Faby Apache and Gran Apache that lasted until 2009. On August 1, 2004, Cynthia and El Oriental unsuccessfully challenged for the AAA World Mixed Tag Team Championship, losing to Gran Apache and Faby Apache. The teams subsequently clashed on several occasions, with the Apaches managing to retain the mixed championship each time. In 2005 the Apaches were forced to vacate the Mixed tag team titles, after which AAA held a tournament to crown new champions. Moreno and El Oriental defeated Gran Apache and Tiffany in the semi-final and then defeated Chessman and La Diabólica in a one-night tournament at Verano de Escandalo to become the new AAA World Mixed Tag Team Champions. Over the next 779 days Moreno and El Oriental repeatedly defended the Mixed tag team title, including defending it on various independent shows. Their reign came to an end in November 2007 when they were forced to vacate the championship when Moreno suffered an injury and was unable to defend the titles. While Moreno was recuperating, Gran Apache and Mari Apache won the vacant title as well as turning técnicos (good guys) in the process. With the Apaches now playing the tecnico role both Moreno and El Oriental turned rúdo upon Moreno's return when they attacked the Apaches after a match. Moreno and El Oriental regained the Mixed tag team title on September 14, 2008 at the Verano de Escandalo. The Dinastia Moreno's second reign with the tag team title turned out to be as active as their first, in fact El Oriental once claimed they defended the titles around 150 times, although records do not support such a claim. In late 2009, both Cynthia and El Oriental left AAA, losing the Mixed Tag Team title to Faby Apache and Aero Star as their last match for AAA. Subsequently Moreno and El Oriental both began working on the Mexican independent circuit.

During the 2009 Guerra de Titanes show Moreno returned to AAA, siding with former opponent Faby Apache against La Legión Extranjera in the form of Sexy Star, Jennifer Blade, and Rain. As a result Moreno, Faby and her sister Mari Apache faced off against Sexy Star, Rain and Christina Von Eerie during the 2010 Rey de Reyes event, a match which Moreno won for her team by pinning Sexy Star. During a post Rey de Reyes interview Sexy Star claimed that the Apaches and Moreno were nothing but maids, which led to AAA booking a match between Cynthia Moreno, Faby and Mari Apache against Sexy Star, Rain, and Blade in a Triplemanía XVIII match where the person pinned or submitted would have to be the winning team's slave for a month. At Triplemanía La Legión defeated Moreno and the Apaches, when Blade pinned Mari, thanks in part to biased refereeing by Hijo del Tirantes. Following the match Konnan ordered Mari Apache to begin her maid duty right away by cleaning up their dressing room. The stipulation expired on July 6, 2010.

== Personal life ==
Flavia Moreno is a member of an extended wrestling family founded by her father Alfonso Moreno who was both a wrestler and a wrestling promoter and her mother who took over promoting wrestling in Arena Azteca Budokan in Nezahualcoyotl, Mexico State after Alfonso Moreno died. Cinthia's sisters Rossy Alda and Esther are or have been professional wrestlers as well as her brother who works as El Oriental. She is the former sister-in-law of Dr. Wagner, Jr. who was married to Rossy Moreno; she is also the aunt of Rossy and Wagner, Jr.'s son who wrestles as Dr. Wagner III. She's also the former sister-in-law of wrestler Groon XXX who was married to Esther. She is not related to the Moreno family that founded and promotes the International Wrestling Revolution Group promotion.

== Championships and accomplishments ==
- All Japan Women's Pro-Wrestling
  - AJW Tag Team Championship (1 time) – with Esther Moreno
- Lucha Libre AAA Worldwide
  - AAA World Mixed Tag Team Championship (2 times) – with El Oriental
