= Chigusa Nagayo =

Japanese professional wrestler (born 1964)

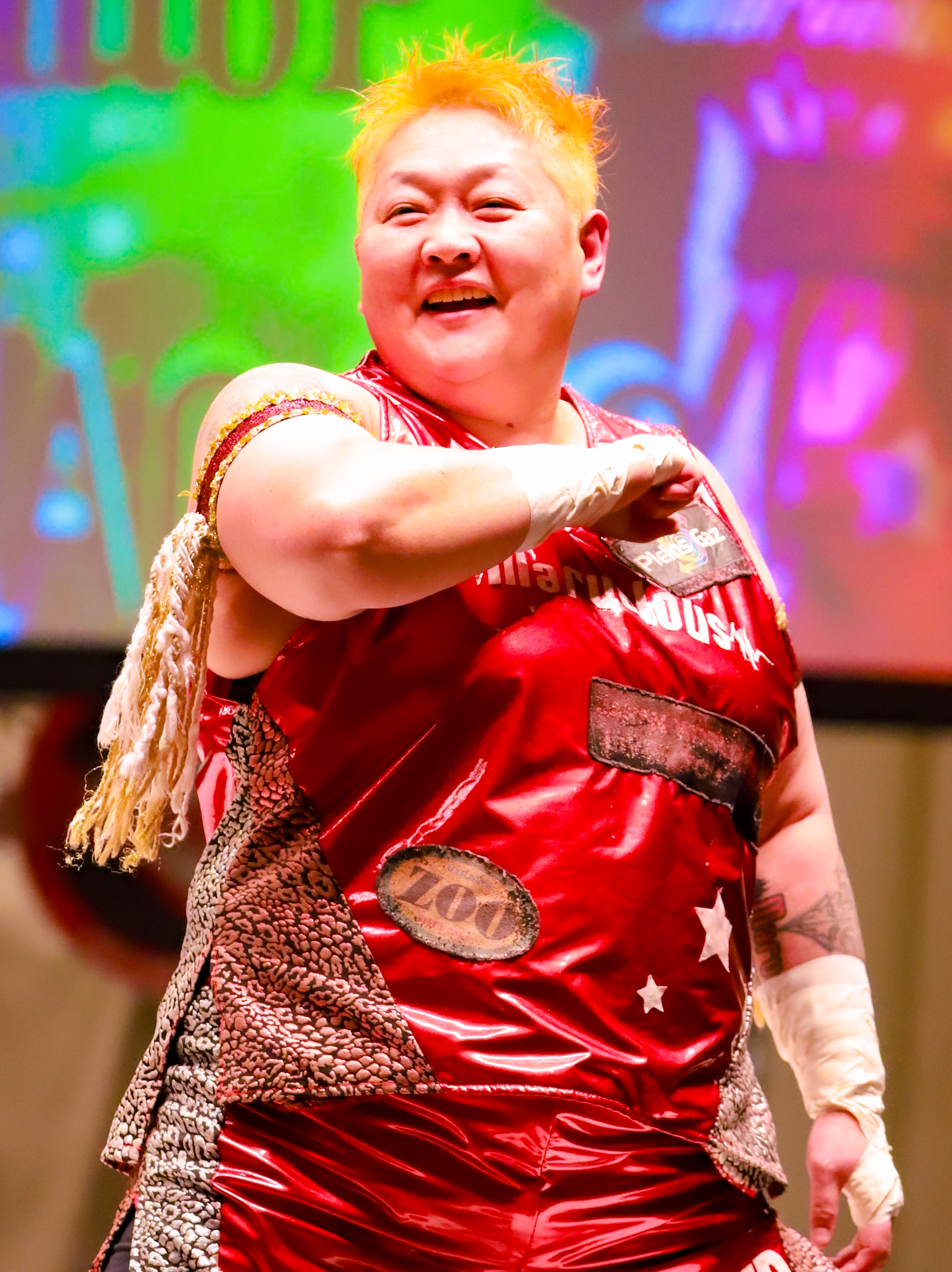
- Nagayo in 2022

Personal information
- Born: December 8, 1964 (age 61) Omura, Nagasaki, Japan

Professional wrestling career
- Ring names: Chigusa Nagayo; Zero; Lady Zero
- Billed height: 1.65 m (5 ft 5 in)
- Billed weight: 87 kg (192 lb)
- Trained by: All Japan Women's Pro-Wrestling
- Debut: August 8, 1980

Chigusa Nagayo (長与千種, Nagayo Chigusa; born December 8, 1964) is a Japanese professional wrestler best known for her mainstream popularity in the 1980s as a member of the Crush Gals with long-time tag team partner Lioness Asuka. In 1995 she founded GAEA Japan and in 2014 created its successor Marvelous That's Women Pro Wrestling. Nagayo is often regarded as the most popular and one of the greatest and most influential female wrestlers of all time. Wrestling Journalist and historian Dave Meltzer has stated that in the 1980s, the Crush Gals reached a level of popularity in Japan equatable to Hulk Hogan in the United States in the same period, and thereafter Chigusa Nagayo was the most popular woman in wrestling for an extended period until her first retirement in 1989.

== Professional wrestling career ==
=== All Japan Women's Pro-Wrestling (1980–1989) ===
==== Early career (1980–1983) ====
Nagayo debuted on August 8, 1980, for All Japan Women's Pro-Wrestling (AJW) against Yukari Omori. She cried upon losing and was scolded by Tomi Aoyama, a member of the Queen Angels, who was retiring that night. Through 1981, she only wrestled eight times due to the promotion having too many wrestlers. On May 15, 1982, Nagayo won the vacant AJW Junior Championship by defeating Itsuki Yamazaki.

==== Crush Gals (1983–1986) ====
On January 4, 1983, Nagayo was matched against her future partner and one-half of the future Crush Gals, Lioness Asuka. They had a standout performance and got a good reaction, which led to them becoming partners. The Crush Gals name was created from a combination of a nickname of Akira Maeda and a Japanese magazine called Gals. The team gained popularity after a losing effort on August 27, in a title match for the WWWA World Tag Team Championship against the Dynamite Girls. The two teams wrestled again in January 1984 to a 60-minute draw. The Crush Gals then wrestled to another 60-minute draw against Jaguar Yokota and Devil Masami in June to a crowd of 5,000 fans. The Crush Gals released their first music single on August 21, called Bible of Fire, eventually selling over 100,000 copies. Nagayo claimed to have never sang in public prior to this single. On August 25, the Crush Gals finally defeated their rivals, the Dynamite Girls, to capture the WWWA World Tag Team Championship.

In 1985, the Crush Gals began a rivalry with Dump Matsumoto's heel stable, the Atrocious Alliance. The feud drew consistent ratings over 12.0 for AJW's weekly television program on Fuji TV. Nagayo claimed she had to move frequently during this time due to large amounts of fans waiting outside her home. On February 25, 1985, Matsumoto and Crane Yu defeated the Crush Gals for the WWWA World Tag Team Championship. In June, Nagayo competed in the 1985 Japan Grand Prix, losing in the semi-finals to Matsumoto. On August 28, Nagayo and Matsumoto met in a hair vs. hair match. Nagayo lost the match, having her head shaved which shocked the crowd. Soon after, Nagayo was able to get some revenge when the Crush Gals defeated the Atrocious Alliance to win the 1985 Tag League the Best. However, Nagayo suffered a knee injury in December, which caused the Crush Gals to vacate the WWWA World Tag Team Championship and for Nagayo to miss some of early 1986. On March 20, 1986, the Crush Gals re-captured the WWWA World Tag Team Championship from The Jumping Bomb Angels, who had won the vacated belts. The Nagayo and Matsumoto feud continued in a match at Ryōgoku Kokugikan on April 5, where Nagayo won.

==== Post-Crush Gals (1986–1989) ====
In May 1986, the Crush Gals suspended all non-wrestling activities and soon after broke up. Nagayo competed in the 1986 Japan Grand Prix, losing in the finals to rival Yukari Omori. The feud between Nagayo and Dump Matsumoto still continued, and the two met in a second hair vs. hair match after an incident where the Atrocious Alliance cut up Nagayo's clothes after a performance. The rematch was held on November 7, with Nagayo gaining revenge and cutting Matsumoto's hair. On February 26, Nagayo and Lioness Asuka clashed in a #1 Contender's Match for the WWWA World Single Championship. The match went to a 30-minute draw. They were given an additional five minutes but when no winner was decided, the match went to a referee's decision where Asuka was awarded the victory. Nagayo won the 1987 Japan Grand Prix. The tournament featured another Nagayo vs. Lioness Asuka match before Nagayo defeated Dump Matsumoto in the finals. On October 20, Nagayo met rival Yukari Omori in a title vs. title match, with Nagayo putting up her All Pacific Championship against Omori's WWWA World Single Championship, with Nagayo winning. After winning both the 1987 Japan Grand Prix and the WWWA World Single Championship, Nagayo was awarded the 1987 All Japan Women's MVP award. Nagayo finished off the year on December 26, by competing against Devil Masami in Masami's retirement match. On January 5, 1988, Nagayo and Yukari Omori had their last singles match against each other for the WWWA World Single Championship, with Nagayo winning.

On February 25, 1988, two of Nagayo's main rivals, Dump Matsumoto and Yukari Omori retired. To mark this occasion, Nagayo and Lioness Asuka teamed up to take on the oddball pairing of Dump Matsumoto and Yukari Omori. Later that night, Nagayo pleaded with Matsumoto to team together one time before they retired. They wrestled a five-minute exhibition against Asuka and Omori. The show drew a 13.3 rating, making it the most-watched wrestling event in Japan in 1988.

Nagayo held the WWWA World Single Championship up to August 25, 1988, when she lost the title to Lioness Asuka, who vacated it upon winning it due to Nagayo's arm injury. Nagayo toured North America in October, wrestling for World Class Championship Wrestling's 5th Annual Cotton Bowl Extravaganza, Stampede Wrestling and Consejo Mundial de Lucha Libre. Nagayo and Lioness Asuka met in a WWWA World Single Championship rematch on January 22, 1989, with Asuka winning. On March 4, 1989, the Crush Gals won the WWWA Tag Titles for the last time from The Calgary Typhoons of Yumi Ogura and Mika Komatsu. They vacated the titles in May.

In 1989, Nagayo reached age 26, the mandatory retirement age for female wrestlers in AJW at the time. Nagayo claimed to be getting married, however later admitted that it was a lie. Nagayo retired at WrestleMarinepiad '89 on May 6, 1989. In Nagayo's retirement match, she teamed with Lioness Asuka against Mitsuko Nishiwaki and Akira Hokuto. Then four impromptu exhibition matches followed including the final Crush Girls vs Jumping Bomb Angels match and one final match between Nagayo and Asuka.

=== Return to AJW (1993–1994) ===
Nagayo returned from retirement at All Japan Women's Pro Wrestling Dream Slam 1 on April 2, 1993, losing to Devil Masami. She said was encouraged by Kōhei Tsuka to return to wrestling. She also wrestled at All Japan Women's Big Egg Wrestling Universe on November 20, 1994, defeating Reggie Bennett.

=== GAEA Japan (1995–2005) and World Championship Wrestling (1996–1997) ===
In 1995, Nagayo formed GAEA Japan (GAEA). Nagayo made her full-time in-ring return at GAEA's first show on April 15, 1995. She wrestled as one of GAEA's main eventers and top faces.

Nagayo appeared twice in the American national promotion World Championship Wrestling (WCW) in 1996 under the ring name "Zero". Zero's first appearance would be as part of a tournament for the WCW Women's Championship, and saw Zero defeated by Madusa on the December 14 edition of Nitro. After the departure of then champion Akira Hokuto, she would appear on the September 20, 1997 edition of WCW Japan competing for the vacant title, though she would be defeated by Devil Masami.

In December 1998, Asuka debuted in GAEA and played a heel, allying with Nagayo's rivals and winning the presidency of GAEA from Nagayo in their first match together in ten years, on April 4, 1999. Eventually, however, on December 27, 1999, Crush Gals re-united and went on to win their fourth tag team championship together in spring 2004.

While with GAEA, Nagayo briefly competed as her alter-ego, Lady Zero.

=== Second retirement (2005–2013), ===
On April 3, 2005, Nagayo and Asuka teamed up for the last time, defeating Chikayo Nagashima and Sugar Sato on GAEA's 10th Anniversary Show; Asuka retired afterward because of neck injuries. Nagayo retired a week later after losing to her protégée, Meiko Satomura in the main event of GAEA's Eternal Last Gong Show, the promotion's farewell card.

Following her retirement, Nagayo began producing her own independent events. During this time Nagayo returned to the ring sporadically: On April 15, 2005, Nagayo, Ryuji Ito and Sanshiro Takagi defeated Mayumi Ozaki, Abdullah Kobayashi, and Shadow WX in a Fluorescent Lighttubes & Barbed Wire Alpha Death match. She also produced and wrestled at Devil Masami's retirement event in December 2008.

=== Sendai Girls & Marvelous (2013–2024) ===
Having spent five years being mostly inactive, Nagayo returned to the ring in late 2013 to participate in a storyline at Sendai Girls' Pro Wrestling, where she took Meiko Satomura trainee Kagetsu under her wing. On December 11, 2013, Nagayo announced that she would return to the ring at her self-produced event on March 22, 2014, when she would face Dump Matsumoto in a six-woman tag team match. In the match, Nagayo, Kagetsu and Takumi Iroha defeated Matsumoto, Kaoru and Yoshiko with Nagayo pinning Matsumoto for the win. At the end of the event, Nagayo announced she was planning on starting her own promotion named Marvelous That's Women Pro Wrestling.

==== Setting up Marvelous That's Women Pro Wrestling ====
Nagayo began signing wrestlers for Marvelous in early 2015. In May 2015, Nagayo revealed that Marvelous was also scheduled to feature male wrestlers, while also announcing that she was returning to the United States to hold tryouts for the promotion, which was scheduled to launch in the spring of 2016. On September 12, Nagayo and Atsushi Onita defeated Dump Matsumoto and Taru to become the inaugural Bakuha-ō ("Blast King") Tag Team Champions. The title was promoted by Onita as part of his Chō Hanabi Puroresu shows. Marvelous held its first event on May 3, 2016. Thereafter, Nagayo would wrestle for Marvelous a few times a year until 2020 and the onset of the COVID-19 pandemic. which significantly disrupted professional wrestling events in Japan for many years.

=== Third retirement ===
In March 2024 Nagayo announced she would be once again retiring from active in-ring wrestling following a retirement match that pitted Nagayo, Queen Aminata & Takumi Iroha against Masha Slamovich, Mio Momono & Sandra Moone for San Francisco-based wrestling promotion West Coast Pro. She came out of retirement 5 months later, wrestling Chi-Chi at a Marvelous show.

== Other media ==
Nagayo appears in the 2000 documentary Gaea Girls made for the BBC by Kim Longinotto and Jano Williams. Nagayo also attempted the Daruma 7 challenge on Kinniku Banzuke.

== Personal life ==
Nagayo did work in theatre and in 1991 performed in a play called, "Ring! Ring! Ring!", which was about women's wrestling. She also appeared on a television show as a physical education teacher. On November 19, 2018, Nagayo saved a woman from assault in a carpark in Susukino.

== Championships and accomplishments ==
- All Japan Women's Pro-Wrestling
  - AJW Junior Championship (2 times)
  - All Pacific Championship (2 times)
  - IWA World Women's Championship (2 times)
  - WWWA World Single Championship (1 time)
  - WWWA World Tag Team Championship (4 times) – with Lioness Asuka
  - 1981 Rookie of the Year Decision Tournament
  - Japan Grand Prix (1987)
  - Tag League the Best (1986) – with Yumiko Hotta
  - Tag League the Best (1987) – with Lioness Asuka
  - AJW Hall of Fame (Class of 1998)
- Cauliflower Alley Club
  - Other honoree (1996)
- Chō Hanabi Puroresu
  - Bakuha-ō Championship (1 time)
  - Bakuha-ō Tag Team Championship (1 time) – with Atsushi Onita
  - Bakujoō Championship (1 time, inaugural)
- GAEA Japan
  - AAAW Single Championship (2 times, inaugural) (Note: During Nagayo's first reign, the championship was called the AAAW Heavyweight Championship. Before her second reign, the title was re-named as the AAAW Single Championship.)
  - AAAW Tag Team Championship (1 time) – with Lioness Asuka
- Oz Academy
  - Best Wizard Award (1 time)
    - Best Bout Award (2023) with Mio Momono and Tomoko Watanabe vs. Kakeru, Mayumi Ozaki and Saori Anou on October 22
- Tokyo Sports
  - Best Tag Team Award (2015) with Atsushi Onita
- Wrestling Observer Newsletter
  - Wrestling Observer Newsletter Hall of Fame (Class of 1997)

== Luchas de Apuestas record ==
Winner (wager)	Loser (wager)	Location	Event	Date	Notes
Dump Matsumoto (hair)	Chigusa Nagayo (hair)	Osaka-Jo Hall - Osaka, Japan	AJW show	August 28, 1985	
Chigusa Nagayo (hair)	Dump Matsumoto (hair)	Osaka-Jo Hall - Osaka, Japan	AJW show	November 7, 1986	
