= Esther Moreno =

Mexican wrestler (born 1969)

Personal information
- Born: María Esther Moreno León; February 20, 1969 (age 57) Mexico City, Mexico
- Parent: Alfonso Moreno (father)
- Relatives: El Oriental (brother); Cynthia Moreno (sister); Alda Moreno (sister); Rossy Moreno (sister); El Hijo de Dr. Wagner Jr. (nephew); Galeno del Mal (nephew)

Professional wrestling career
- Ring name(s): Esther Moreno; Ultima Tigrita; Chiquita Azteca
- Billed height: 1.53 m (5 ft 0 in)
- Billed weight: 59 kg (130 lb)
- Trained by: Blue Panther; Gran Hamada; Alfonso Moreno
- Debut: March 18, 1984

María Esther Moreno León (born February 20, 1969) is a Mexican professional wrestler best known under the ring name Esther Moreno. In AAA she is a former 2 time AAA Reina de Reinas Champion.

== Professional wrestling career ==
In the early 1990s Esther and her sister Cynthia Moreno travelled to Japan to wrestle for All Japan Women's Pro-Wrestling. On April 21, 1991 the Moreno sisters defeated Etsuko Mita and Mima Shimoda to win the AJW Tag Team Championship, making them the first Mexican team to hold a championship in Japan. They would hold the titles until August 2, 1991 where they lost the title to Takako Inoue and Mariko Yoshida.

== Personal life ==
Esther Moreno is a member of an extended professional wrestling family founded by her father Alfonso Moreno who was both a wrestler and a wrestling promoter and her mother who took over promoting wrestling in Arena Azteca Budokan in Nezahualcoyotl, Mexico State after Alfonso Moreno died. Esther's sisters Rossy Alda and Cynthia Moreno are or have been professional wrestlers as well as her brother who works as El Orientál. She is the former sister-in-law of Dr. Wagner, Jr. who was married to Rossy Moreno, she is also the aunt of Rossy and Wagner, Jr.'s son who wrestles as El Hijo de Dr. Wagner Jr.

== Championships and accomplishments ==
- AAA
  - AAA Reina de Reinas Championship (2 times)
- All Japan Women's Pro-Wrestling
  - AJW Tag Team Championship (1 time) – with Cynthia Moreno
