= Takako Inoue =

Japanese professional wrestler (born 1969)

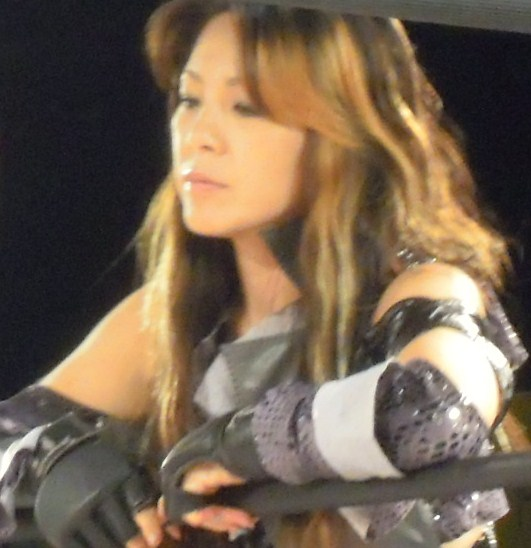
- Inoue in July 2010

Personal information
- Born: November 7, 1969 (age 56) Ibaragi-ken, Toride Shi, Japan

Professional wrestling career
- Ring name(s): Beauty☆Takaco; Takako Inoue
- Billed height: 1.63 m (5 ft 4 in)
- Billed weight: 63 kg (139 lb)
- Trained by: Jaguar Yokota
- Debut: October 10, 1988

Takako Inoue (井上 貴子, Inoue Takako; born November 7, 1969) is a Japanese professional wrestler. She wrestled primarily for the All Japan Women's Pro-Wrestling promotion, and held several championships, primarily in tag team wrestling. She was well known as one-half of the tag team Double Inoue, which she formed with fellow wrestler Kyoko Inoue (no relation).

== Professional wrestling career ==
=== All Japan Women's Pro-Wrestling (1988–1999) ===
She was born November 7, 1969, in Toride, Ibaraki. A magazine model at the time, she possessed an athletic background in track and field and amateur wrestling. She failed her first audition for All Japan Women's Pro-Wrestling (AJW) but trained with Mayumi Ozaki. While she failed her first AJW audition, she passed the second screening for the music group, Onyanko Club. Ozaki passed her audition for Japan Women's Pro Wrestling and invited Takako to join, but she declined. She then passed her AJW audition and joined in October, 1987, where she was trained by Jaguar Yokota. Takako made her debut on October 8, 1988, against (not related) fellow rookie and future tag team partner Kyoko Inoue in AJW.

On April 2, 1991, she defeated Inoue for the All Japan Singles title. This was an important push for a wrestler so young, but her beauty and improving work rate was considered strong enough to put her over for the belt. She held it for a year, pretty outstanding for the time. She lost the title to Mariko Yoshida exactly one year later.

She was paired with Mariko Yoshida; the brain trust figuring their styles would complement each other. They were booked to win the All Japan Tag Team titles on August 2, 1991, from Cynthia Moreno and Esther Moreno.

On November 21, 1991, Inoue released a single called "Door of Miracle".

Inoue and Yoshida then lost them to another up and coming team, Debbie Malenko and Sakie Hasegawa, on January 5, 1992. On April 25, 1992, Takako and Yoshida took the titles back from Hawegawa and Malenko before losing them to Bat Yoshinaga and Tomoko Watanabe on December 1, 1992.

After the hot tag run ended, Takako found herself in the supporting role of a tag team with Yumiko Hotta. On September 5, 1993, she and Hotta won the UWA Tag Team titles from Akira Hokuto and Suzuka Minami. They had a good run, though only defending the titles occasionally, while the AJW brain trust was figuring her future. This caused Inoue to consider retirement. Hotta and Inoue finally lost the titles on March 30, 1994, to Etsuko Mita and Mima Shimoda.

Her big break came when she and Kyoko Inoue formed a tag-team named “Double Inoue”, in which Takako adopted Kyoko's usual face paint design. They defeated Manami Toyota and Toshiyo Yamada for the WWWA World Tag Team Championship from on October 9, 1994, ending Toyota and Yamada’s almost two1/2 year domination. They defended the titles once, and then vacated them in an angle where they, being the 99th WWWA tag champs, wanted to be the 100th. On March 21, 1995, a one-night tournament was held with Double Inoue winning three matches to regain the titles. Double Inoue would now go on to dominate the tag titles, becoming the hot tag team in AJW for the next eighteen months. (They held the WWWA tag titles three times during this period.) Their hottest feud during this time was with the team of Manami Toyota and Sakie Hasegawa (or her masked alter ego, Blizzard Yuki). The feud produced quite a few outstanding tussles, including the one-night tournament final. After losing the titles to Shimoda and Toyota on June 22, 1996, the Inoues split up; it was decided that Kyoko would be getting a serious push at the WWWA World Single Championship.

Takako was not forgotten, however, as she would also win singles gold during this time. She defeated Reggie Bennett for the IWA Women’s title on December 4, 1995, and would defeat Bennett once again on November 21, 1996, in a unification match where Takako walked off with both the IWA title and the All-Pacific title. Takako then challenged ex-partner and WWWA champion Kyoko Inoue on January 20, 1997, in a losing effort to unify all three titles. After Kyoko vacated the All-Pacific title, Takako defeated Yamada to regain the belt on June 18, 1997. However, a severe eye injury suffered in a title defense caused Takako to miss three months and vacate the title. Once healed, she won the All-Pacific title back on January 3, 1998. She then lost it on April 21, 1998, to ZAP T (Tomoko Watanabe as a masked heel).

She has also worked many inter-promotional matches while with AJW, being among the first to work them, notably against Cutie Suzuki and Mayumi Ozaki of JWP Joshi Puroresu. But for all that, she was never positioned as a top-level single in AJW, instead being a top mid-carder, used to set up those for the push into the top level. Amazingly, for someone with her experience, she had only two matches for the WWWA title: one against Kyoko Inoue, and in October, 1995, she was Dynamite Kansai’s first defense after Kansai had just won the WWWA title. Her last major singles hurrah for AJW during this period was her push for the All-Pacific Title.

Given the fact she was spinning her wheels and facing the specter of continued bookings against the ZAPs, in what essentially turned into comedy matches, Takako left AJW in 1999 to freelance. Getting out from under AJW seemed to help, for she found herself in demand. She soon landed in Ladies Legend Pro-Wrestling, where, on September 2, 2000, Takako, Rumi Kazama and Eagle Sawai (collectively known as Black Joker) won the vacant LLPW Six Woman Tag Team titles from Miho Wakizawa, Nanae Takahashi and Toyota They held the belts for almost two years before dropping them to Mizuki Endo, Keiko Aono, & Rieko Amano on June 15, 2002.

=== Freelance (1999–present) ===
As a freelancer she worked for various women's promotions, such as LLPW (Ladies Legend Pro-Wrestling), Oz Academy, and Arsion. She has been signed to LLPW since February 2005.

== Other fields ==
Inoue has posed for several modeling photobooks. In 2008, she appeared with fellow wrestlers Mio Shirai and Kayo Noumi in The Brute Educational Institution (野獣学園, Yajū Gakuen), a video with lesbian discipline and catfight themes, released by ATTACK ZONE, a label of Attackers.

== Championships and accomplishments ==
- All Japan Women's Pro-Wrestling
  - All Pacific Championship (3 times)
  - AJW Championship (1 time)
  - AJW Tag Team Championship (3 times) - with Mariko Yoshida (2) Tomoko Watanabe (1)
  - IWA World Women's Championship (1 time)
  - UWA World Women's Tag Team Championship (1 time) - with Yumiko Hotta
  - WWWA World Tag Team Championship (6 times) - with Kyoko Inoue (4), Mima Shimoda (1), and Rumi Kazama (1)
  - Tag League the Best (1994) – with Manami Toyota
- Arsion
  - Twin Star of Arsion Championship (1 time) - with Rie Tamada
- Dramatic Dream Team
  - Ironman Heavymetalweight Championship (1 time)
- Ladies Legend Pro-Wrestling
  - LLPW Six Woman Tag Team Championship (1 time) - with Rumi Kazama and Eagle Sawai
  - LLPW Tag Team Championship (1 time) - with Shinobu Kandori
- World Woman Pro-Wrestling Diana
  - World Woman Pro-Wrestling Diana Tag Team Championship (2 times) - with Yumiko Hotta and Kyoko Inoue (1)
