= Kazue Nagahori =

Japanese professional wrestler (born 1968)

Kazue Nagahori - 永堀一恵
Personal information
- Born: November 12, 1968 (age 57)

Professional wrestling career
- Ring name: Kazue Nagahori
- Billed height: 1.60 m (5 ft 3 in)
- Billed weight: 80 kg (180 lb)
- Trained by: AJW dojo
- Debut: July 21, 1984
- Retired: 1988

Kazue Nagahori (永堀 一恵, Nagahori Kazue; born 12 November 1968) is a Japanese professional wrestler who stood out in All Japan Women's Pro-Wrestling.

== Career ==
Nagahori was born in Saitama, Japan, and began her career as a fighter in 1984 in the All Japan Women's Pro-Wrestling. She received trophies and medals and received the title of champion. Fighting with Yumi Ogura in a team called the Red Typhoons, she defeated the Americans Velvet McIntyre and Judy Martin. Nagahori alone defeated Bull Nakano, Devil Masami, Itsuki Yamazaki and Mika Komatsu.

Nagahori fought approximately 21 fights and retired in 1988.

== Moves ==
- Bearings sobatto
- Kicking leg stretch
- Foot sword

== Championships and accomplishments ==
- All Japan Women's Pro-Wrestling
  - All Japan Tag Team Championship (1 time)
  - WWWA World Tag Team Championship (1 time)
- Network Championship Red Typhoons (Yumi Ogura and Kazue Nagahori)
