= Debbie Malenko =

American professional wrestler (born 1971)

Personal information
- Born: Deborah Killian; March 10, 1971 (age 55) Orlando, Florida, U.S.

Professional wrestling career
- Ring names: Debbie Malenko; Debbie Drake
- Billed height: 5 ft 6 in (1.68 m)
- Billed weight: 143 lb (65 kg)
- Trained by: Boris Malenko
- Debut: 1990

Deborah Killian (born March 10, 1971), known under the ring name Debbie Malenko, is an American professional wrestler. She is best known for her work in joshi puroresu organizations such as All Japan Women's Pro-Wrestling.

== Professional wrestling career ==
=== Early career (1990) ===
Malenko was trained by Boris Malenko in her home state of Florida. In 1990 she made her debut in Florida working for Professional Wrestling Federation.

=== All Japan Women's Pro-Wrestling (1991-1993) ===
Malenko signed with All Japan Women's Pro-Wrestling in 1991. She feuded with Kyoko Inoue. On August 31, 1991 Malenko lost to Inoue for the vacated IWA World Women's Championship.

On January 5, 1992, Malenko and Sakie Hasegawa won the AJW Tag Team Championship defeating Mariko Yoshida and Takako Inoue. They dropped the titles back to Yoshida and Inoue. Also in 1992 they worked in various Japanese promotions and in Mexico for Consejo Mundial de Lucha Libre.

Malenko won the AJW Championship defeating Kaoru Ito on February 10, 1993. During her title regain she feuded with Aja Kong and Terri Powers. Her active wrestling career ended suddenly when she injured her right ankle in a tag with Sakie Hasegawa against Manami Toyota and Toshiyo Yamada on March 11, 1993. During the match Toyota did a plancha (dive) from the top rope to the outside landing on them. Malenko fell awkwardly backwards and her knee and ankle twisted snapping her leg right above the ankle. She vacated the AJW Championship and retired.

=== Sporadic appearances (1999-2017) ===
Originally in 1999, Malenko was supposed to make a in-ring return when National Wrestling Alliance was supposed to have a women's pay-per-view event. However, it never happened.

On November 25, 2001, Malenko had her first match in 8 years facing against Bionic J at ARSION Carinval ARSION 2001. The match ended in a draw.

On November 19, 2017, Malenko wrestled at Mariko Yoshida's retirement show in Tokyo, teaming with Kaoru Ito and Jaguar Yokota and losing to Yoshida, Kyoko Inoue and Takako Inoue.

=== Return to wrestling (2021-present) ===
On August 9, 2021 it was announced that Malenko will participant in the NWA Women's Invitational Cup At NWA EmPowerrr. Her first match back was in the battle royal at NWA EmPowerrr which was won by Chelsea Green. On October 9, Malenko won a battle royal at 50 years old at Twisted Wrestling in Port Charlotte, Florida.

On April 15, 2022, Malenko wrestled against Masha Slamovich at West Coast Pro Wrestling's Pro Game Related event in San Francisco, California. Slamovich won the match.

== Championships and accomplishments ==
- All Japan Women's Pro-Wrestling

- AJW Championship (1 time)
- AJW Tag Team Championship – with Sakie Hasegawa

- Women's Wrestling Hall of Fame
  - Class of 2026
