= Etsuko Mita =

Japanese professional wrestler

Personal information
- Born: May 28, 1969 (age 57) Setagaya, Tokyo, Japan

Professional wrestling career
- Ring name: Etsuko Mita
- Billed height: 5 ft 8 in (173 cm)
- Billed weight: 165 lb (75 kg)
- Trained by: Jaguar Yokota
- Debut: 1987
- Retired: November 1, 2009

Etsuko Mita (三田英津子, Mita Etsuko; born May 28, 1969) is a Japanese retired professional wrestler. She formed a successful tag team with her partner Mima Shimoda as Las Cachorras Orientales (Spanish for "The Oriental Bitches"; which was originally a trio with Akira Hokuto) and Toshiyo Yamada as Dream Orca. She is credited as the creator of the Death Valley Driver. Mita retired on November 1, 2009, defeating former tag team partner Makoto in her final singles match and teaming with Mima Shimoda in a loss against Kyoko Inoue and Nanae Takahashi in her final tag team match.

== Professional wrestling career ==
=== Early career (1987–1992) ===
Etsuko Mita debuted on July 31, 1987 against Chiaki Ishikawa and on August 5, 1987, she fought against her debuting future partner, Mima Shimoda. She was part of the 1987 All Japan Women's Pro-Wrestling debut class that included Manami Toyota, Toshiyo Yamada and Mima Shimoda. She teamed with Toshiyo Yamada early on, forming "Dream Orca". On June 14, 1989, Mita captured the AJW Tag Team Championship with Toshiyo Yamada, but the team had to vacate the titles in March 1990 when Yamada was injured.

On November 14, 1990 at Wrestle Marinepiad '90, Mita and Shimoda, prior to becoming LCO captured the AJW Tag Team Championship from the "Honey Wings" of Mika Takahashi and Kaoru. The reign lasted until April 21, 1991, when they were defeated by Esther and Cynthia Moreno at AJW St. Battle Day Part 2. This was Mita and Shimoda's only AJW Tag Team Championship together.

By 1991, Mita started teaming with Manami Toyota to form the "Mint Showers". While the team did not have much success in-ring, on November 21, 1991, they released a single together called, "TIME TO GO", which was on the same record as Takako Inoue's "Door of Miracle" song. The Mint Showers teamed up together for Tag League the Best 1991 in October 1991, but finished near the bottom of the standings.

=== Las Cachorras Orientales (1992–2009) ===
In 1992, Mita formed Las Cachorras Orientales (commonly known as LCO) with Mima Shimoda and Akira Hokuto. While Hokuto was an original member, she did not stay on long as a regular with the team. The team mostly wrestled in the undercard until they captured both the JWP Tag Team Championship and the UWA World Women's Tag Team Championship in March 1994. The team held both sets of titles until January 8, 1995, when they lost their JWP Tag Team Championship to Hikari Fukuoka and Mayumi Ozaki. On September 2, 1995, they vacated their UWA World Women's Tag Team Championship after a successful defense against Lioness Asuka and Jaguar Yokota.

On June 18, 1997, the team captured the WWWA World Tag Team Championship for the first time by defeating Tomoko Watanabe and Kumiko Maekawa, finally capturing the titles after 5 years as a team.

=== Post All Japan Women's career ===
Mita left All Japan Women's Pro-Wrestling with Shimoda in October 1997 as the promotion filed for bankruptcy for NEO Japan Ladies Pro-Wrestling. Between October 1997 and February 1998, the team made stops in Ladies Legend Pro-Wrestling, JDStar and Gaea Japan while creating a rivalry with Kyoko Inoue and Misae Genki in NEO. The team also stopped in JWP later that year.

The team became freelance in 1999. They wrestled multiple matches for Gaea Japan eventually joining the heel faction, SSU (Super Star Unit). The also started to appear in Arsion during Summer 1999, winning the Twin Stars of Arsion League in December 1999. They also returned to All Japan Women's during this time, capturing the WWWA Tag Titles on July 10, 1999.

In 2003, Mita joined NEO Japan Ladies Pro-Wrestling full-time again. She spent the rest of her career wrestling both single and tag team matches. On November 1, 2009, LCO teamed for the final time as Mita retired. They teamed against Kyoko Inoue and Nanae Takahashi.

== Championships and accomplishments ==
- All Japan Women's Pro-Wrestling
  - AJW Tag Team Championship (2 times) – with Toshiyo Yamada (1) and Mima Shimoda (1)
  - WWWA World Tag Team Championship (5 times) – with Mima Shimoda (4) and Nanae Takahashi (1)
  - Tag League the Best (2000) – with Mima Shimoda
- Dramatic Dream Team
  - Ironman Heavymetalweight Championship (1 time)
  - Jiyūgaoka 6-Person Tag Team Championship (1 time) – with Hero! and Sanshiro Takagi
- Ice Ribbon
  - International Ribbon Tag Team Championship (1 time) – with Makoto
- JWP Joshi Puroresu
  - JWP Tag Team Championship (1 time) – with Mima Shimoda
- NEO Japan Ladies Pro-Wrestling
  - NEO Single Championship (1 time)
  - NEO Tag Team Championship (1 time) – with Kyoko Inoue
  - NEO Kitazawa Tag Team Championship (1 time) – with Kyoko Inoue
  - NWA Women's Pacific Championship (1 time)
  - NEO Hall of Fame (2010)
- Tokyo Sports
  - Joshi Puroresu Grand Prize (2000) – with Mima Shimoda
- Universal Wrestling Association
  - UWA World Women's Tag Team Championship – with Mima Shimoda
