= Bull Nakano =

Japanese professional wrestler and golfer (born 1968)

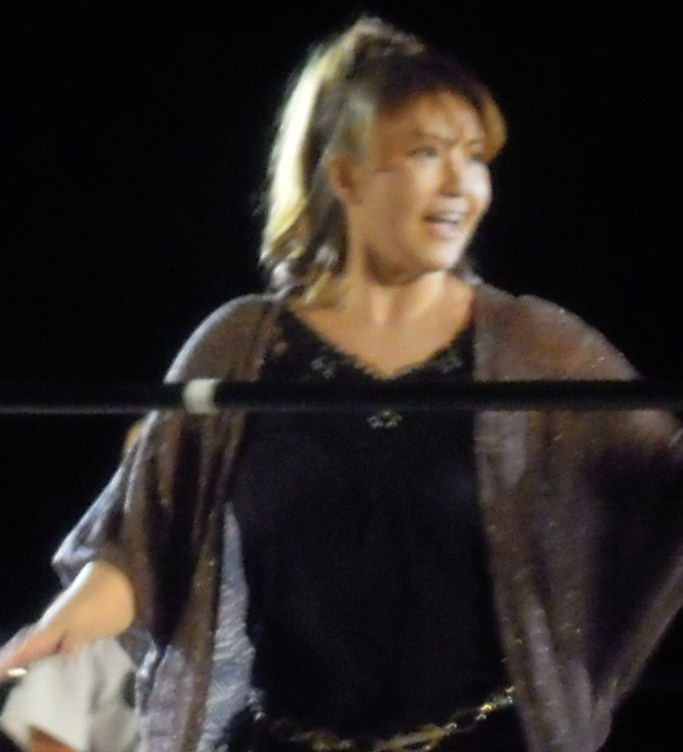
- Nakano in 2011

Personal information
- Born: Keiko Nakano; 8 January 1968 (age 58) Kawaguchi, Saitama, Japan

Professional wrestling career
- Ring name(s): Bull Nakano; Keiko Nakano
- Billed height: 1.70 m (5 ft 7 in)
- Billed weight: 91 kg (201 lb)
- Billed from: Kawaguchi, Japan
- Trained by: All Japan Women's Pro-Wrestling
- Debut: 1983
- Retired: November 3, 2017

Keiko Aoki (青木 恵子, Aoki Keiko; née Nakano (中野), born 8 January 1968) is a Japanese retired professional wrestler and professional golfer better known as Bull Nakano (ブル中野, Burunakano). She began competing in All Japan Women's Pro-Wrestling (AJW) as a teenager under the ring name Bull Nakano. As a wrestler she was a villain, who often teamed with her mentor Dump Matsumoto. In Japan, she held several of AJW's singles and tag team championships. After being phased out by the company in the early 1990s, she traveled to North America, where she first competed in Mexico's Consejo Mundial de Lucha Libre (CMLL), becoming its first World Women's Champion. In 1994, she made her way to the World Wrestling Federation (WWF), where she had feuded with Alundra Blayze over the WWF Women's Championship. After holding the title once, she also competed in World Championship Wrestling (WCW). In 1998, Nakano began competing as a professional golfer, and in 2006, she joined a tour with the Ladies Professional Golf Association (LPGA). She was inducted into the Wrestling Observer Newsletter Hall of Fame in 2001 and was inducted into the WWE Hall of Fame in 2024.

== Professional wrestling career ==
=== All Japan Women's Pro-Wrestling (1983–1996) ===
Nakano's career as a professional wrestler began in All Japan Women's Pro-Wrestling (AJW) organization in Japan when she was 15 years old. After winning the AJW Junior Championship at the age of 16 in 1984, her ring name was changed to Bull Nakano. In July 1985, she won the AJW Championship, which she held for the next three years. Meanwhile, she teamed with Dump Matsumoto, who was also her mentor, as a pair of heels. With Matsumoto as her partner, Nakano won the WWWA World Tag Team Championship in August 1986. Nakano and Matsumoto also wrestled for the World Wrestling Federation in 1986 against the team of Velvet McIntyre and Dawn Marie Johnston.

After Matsumoto's retirement, Nakano won the WWWA World Tag Team Championship a second and third time, with Condor Saito in 1987 and Grizzly Iwamoto in 1988. As a singles wrestler, she won the 1988 Japan Grand Prix in June. One year later in June 1989, she also defeated Mitsuko Nishiwaki to win AJW's All Pacific Championship, which she lost to Noriyo Tateno in November. Around the start of the 1990s, Nakano began to be positioned as the ace of AJW. In January 1990, Nakano won a tournament final to win the vacant WWWA World Single Championship. She held the title for nearly three years, before dropping it to Aja Kong in November 1992. Afterward, AJW's use of Nakano in storylines and matches decreased.

=== Consejo Mundial de Lucha Libre (1992–1993) ===
After she stopped working for AJW, Nakano traveled to Mexico in June 1992, where she was a finalist in a 12-woman battle royal and later defeated Lola González to become Consejo Mundial de Lucha Libre's first World Women's Champion. She lost the title to Xóchitl Hamada in March 1993.

=== World Wrestling Federation (1994–1995) ===
She then made her way to the United States and competed for the World Wrestling Federation (WWF) once again. Debuting as an associate of Luna Vachon, Nakano competed against the WWF Women's Champion, Alundra Blayze in August 1994 at SummerSlam, but failed to win the title. Nakano eventually defeated Blayze for the title on November 20, 1994, in Tokyo at the Big Egg Wrestling Universe event. Among her defenses was a victory over Kyoko Inoue in March 1995 in the semi-main event of AJW's Wrestling Queendom Victory show. Nakano's title run lasted for approximately five months, until she lost it back to Blayze on the April 3, 1995, episode of Raw (in a match taped weeks prior) ending her reign at 134 days. The rematch occurred in the wake of Wrestlemania XI the night before. The WWF had planned on bringing in Bertha Faye to feud with Nakano while Blayze got plastic surgery on her nose and breasts.

It would be her last match in the company, having been released soon after for allegedly being found in possession of cocaine.

=== World Championship Wrestling (1995–1996) ===
In 1995, Nakano also traveled to North Korea, where she was part of the joint New Japan Pro-Wrestling/World Championship Wrestling (WCW) Collision in Korea event in Pyongyang that set a record for attendance at a professional wrestling event with 150,000 spectators. At the event, Nakano and Akira Hokuto defeated Manami Toyota and Mariko Yoshida. Later that year, she competed at WCW's World War 3 pay-per-view event, teaming with Akira Hokuto to defeat the team of Cutie Suzuki and Mayumi Ozaki. Nakano—with Sonny Onoo as her manager—continued her feud with Blayze, who was now known as Madusa, at WCW's Hog Wild event in August 1996; Madusa defeated Nakano in the match with the stipulation that she was then allowed to destroy Nakano's motorcycle. In subsequent years, Madusa called Nakano "a good-hearted person" and an "incredible talent", with whom she had some of her best matches.

=== Retirement ===
Due to injuries, Bull Nakano retired from professional wrestling in 1997. On January 8, 2012, Nakano produced her own professional wrestling event, titled "Empress", which saw her recreate her most famous matches with her old opponents. The event ended with Nakano's official retirement ceremony, though she had not been an active wrestler for several years.

=== Rise Wrestling (2017) ===
It was announced at Rise Wrestling's Bellatrix 26/Rise 4 event on September 15, 2017, that Bull Nakano would join the promotion as a facilitator, along with Cheerleader Melissa and Madusa, Nakano's former rival. Nakano turned heel during her appearance at Rise 6 on December 1, when she attacked Melissa during her match against Kikyo, and formed a modified version of her heel faction, Gokumon-To; aligning with Kikyo, Dynamite DiDi, and Kris Wolf. Nakano appeared later in the event as a heel manager for Kris Wolf in her match against Shotzi Blackheart (who had Madusa in her corner), and provided interference that led to Wolf defeating Blackheart.

=== Sukeban (2023–present) ===
On September 21, 2023, Bull appeared at the inaugural show for the US based, all-female Japanese pro wrestling promotion Sukeban, where she announced she would be the acting commissioner; she revealed the Sukeban World Championship, and announced the winner of the main event, Ichigo (Unagi) Sayaka, would face Commander (Arisa) Nakajima at the next show—crowning the first champion.

=== WWE return and Hall of Fame (2024) ===
On 5 April 2024, Nakano was inducted into the WWE Hall of Fame Class of 2024. The induction speech was given by Alundra Blayze.

== Professional golf career ==
Nakano became a professional golfer in 1998. In November 2004, Nakano played in the Futures Tour Qualifying Tournament in Florida, but ended the tournament in 250th place of 251. The following year, she ended the tournament in 261st place of 271. As a result, she failed to qualify for the Ladies Professional Golf Association (LPGA). Nakano later qualified for the LPGA and joined the Duramed Futures Tour in January 2006.

== Championships and accomplishments ==
- All Japan Women's Pro-Wrestling
  - AJW Championship (1 time)
  - AJW Junior Championship (1 time)
  - All Pacific Championship (1 time)
  - WWWA World Single Championship (1 time)
  - WWWA World Tag Team Championship (3 times) – with Dump Matsumoto (1), Condor Saito (1), and Grizzly Iwamoto (1)
  - 1983 Rookie of the Year Decision Tournament
  - Japan Grand Prix (1988)
  - Tag League the Best (1985) – with Dump Matsumoto
  - AJW Hall of Fame (1998)
- Consejo Mundial de Lucha Libre
  - CMLL World Women's Championship (1 time, inaugural)
- Tokyo Sports
  - Topic Award (2024) shared with Dump Matsumoto and Mayu Iwatani
- Wrestling Observer Newsletter
  - Wrestling Observer Newsletter Hall of Fame (Class of 2001)
- World Wrestling Federation/World Wrestling Entertainment
  - WWF Women's Championship (1 time)
  - Slammy Award (1 time)
    - Most Devastating (1994)
  - WWE Hall of Fame (Class of 2024)

== Luchas de Apuestas record ==
Winner (wager)	Loser (wager)	Location	Event	Date	Notes
Bull Nakano & Kyoko Inoue (hair)	Aja Kong & Bison Kimura (hair)	Kawasaki, Kanagawa, Japan	AJW event	November 1, 1991	
