= Akira Hokuto =

Japanese professional wrestler

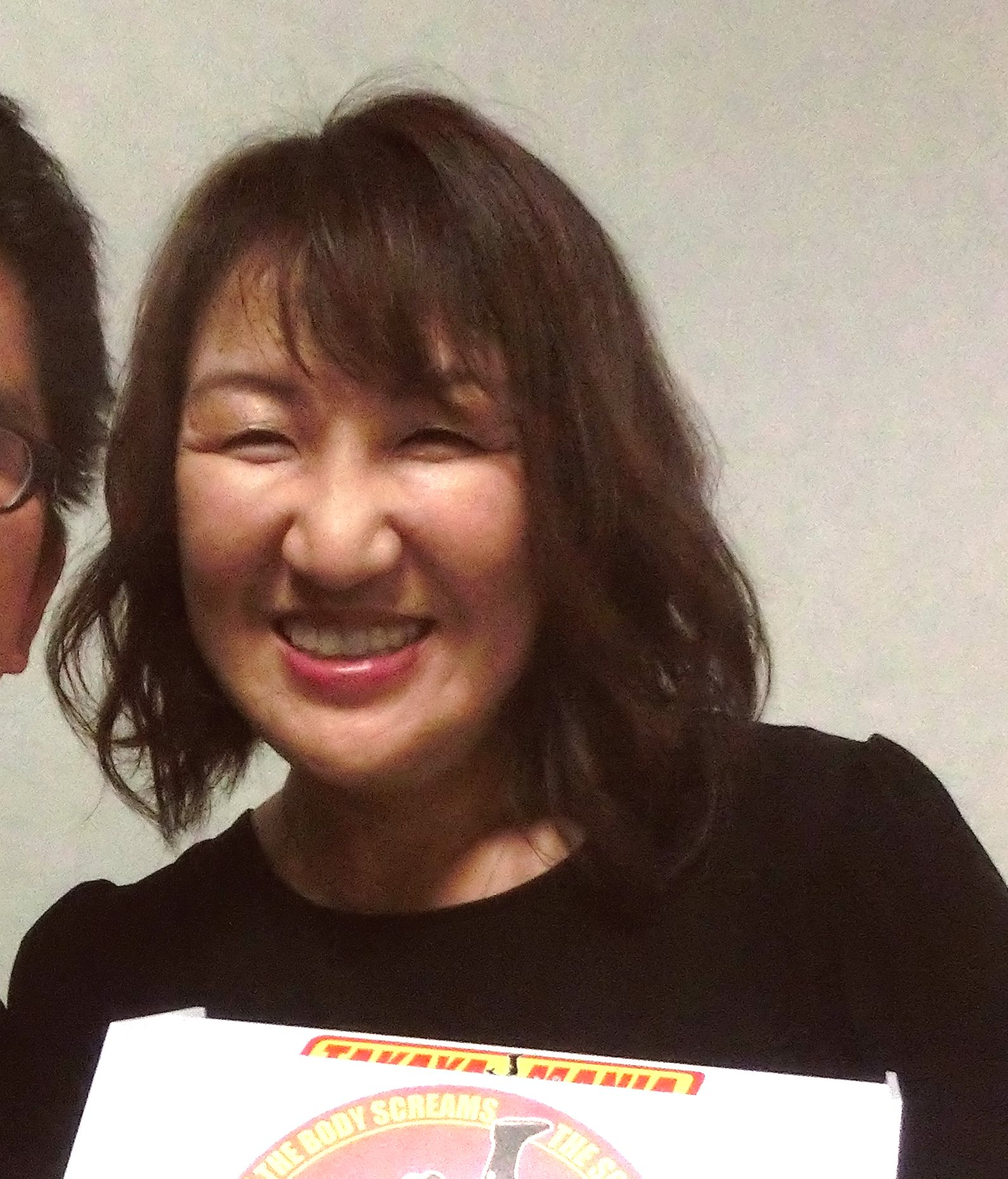
- Hokuto in August 2018

Personal information
- Born: Hisako Uno; July 13, 1967 (age 59) Kitakatsushika, Saitama, Japan
- Spouse: Kensuke Sasaki (m. 1995)
- Children: 2
- Relative: Rin Kadokura (daughter-in-law)

Professional wrestling career
- Ring name(s): Hisako Uno; Reina Jubuki; Akira Hokuto
- Billed height: 1.68 m (5 ft 6 in)
- Billed weight: 60 kg (132 lb)
- Trained by: Jaguar Yokota
- Debut: May 28, 1985
- Retired: February 11, 2006

Hisako Sasaki (佐々木 久子, Sasaki Hisako; née Uno (宇野)), (born July 13, 1967) is a Japanese retired professional wrestler better known as Akira Hokuto (北斗 晶, Hokuto Akira).

== Career ==
Born Hisako Uno, Hokuto became a professional wrestler in the wake of the enormous popularity of tag team the Crush Gals (Chigusa Nagayo and Lioness Asuka), and was responsible for organizing the Bull Nakano fanclub. She joined the AJW dojo after quitting high school.

=== All Japan Women's Pro Wrestling (1985–1995) ===
Debuting for All Japan Women's Pro-Wrestling (AJW) shortly before her eighteenth birthday, Hokuto immediately stood out from the crowd winning AJW's Rookie of the Year award for 1985. The next year, she won the AJW Junior Championship, and participated in AJW's Match of the Year, paired with Yukari Omari in a losing effort against Chigusa Nagayo and Yumiko Hotta in the final of the annual Tag League the Best tournament.

Hokuto won the AJW's top tag team belt, the WWWA World Tag Team Championship, paired with Yumiko Hotta In 1987. Twelve days later, however, the two lost the titles to the Red Typhoons (Kazue Nagahori and Yumi Ogura) in a two out of three falls match. During the finish of the first fall, Hokuto took a tombstone piledriver off the second rope and broke her neck. She wrestled the entirety of the second and third falls, sometimes holding her head in place with her hands. This gained Hokuto a reputation for toughness.

In 1990, Hokuto was booked to win the Japan Grand Prix, AJW's annual tournament to determine the number one contender to the top singles belt, the WWWA World Single Championship. However, she once again suffered a severe injury. During a Grand Prix match against Manami Toyota, Hokuto performed a plancha and crashed her knee into the ringside metal barrier. She tore open her knee, and was rendered unable to walk. Crying, she tied a bandage around her leg, pulled herself back into the ring, and attempted to continue the match. It was clearly impossible, however, and she was removed from the tournament. When Hokuto returned to singles competition, she slowly revealed a new, more dynamic, persona. She grew her hair longer and bleached it blonde, wore flashy attire, used stylised make-up to complement her features and called herself "Akira Hokuto", after popular wrestler Akira Maeda. Teaming with Suzuka Minami as the Marine Wolves, she won the WWWA Tag Team belts twice more. She also won the All Pacific Championship in 1991 and 1992, and sustained many more injuries (earning the nickname 'the Mummy' since she so often came to the ring wrapped in bandages).

The year 1993 is considered by many to be the best year of her career. She feuded with Shinobu Kandori of the LLPW promotion during the inter-promotional period, where the major promotions active in women's wrestling in Japan at the time combined to run shows with dream match-ups that attracted some of the largest cards in history. At AJW All-Star Dreamslam on April 2, 1993, Hokuto defeated Kandori, and is considered by some to be the greatest women's match in history.

Hokuto was subsequently defeated by Kandori in a tag match at Dreamslam II nine days later and in a singles match in December of that year. Also in 1993 she won the Japan Grand Prix and was granted another shot at the WWWA Championship, against champion Aja Kong on October 9. Hokuto was again injured in August of that year, and requested that the match be made a non-title match, since she felt wrestling in her injured state would insult the prestige of the belt.

=== Consejo Mundial de Lucha Libre (1993–1995) ===
Later that year, having married Mexican wrestler Antonio Gómez Medina who worked as "Máscara Mágica", Hokuto moved to Mexico. She continued her career in her new home, adopting the persona "Reina Jabuki"". On July 30, 1994, she defeated La Diabólica for the CMLL World Women's Championship, and carried it for over two years. That year, having divorced her first husband and returned to Japan, she defeated Aja Kong in the final of the interpromotional V*Top Woman Tournament at the Big Egg Wrestling Universe event, which drew a gate of 42,500 to the Tokyo Dome. Hokuto had one of her last great matches for AJW on September 2, 1995, losing a 21-minute match against Manami Toyota. Japanese and latin-american wresting aficionates remember this fight for her entrance with the song "Oro de Ley" from the 20 Años album from Luis Miguel.

=== World Championship Wrestling (1995–1997) ===
On November 26, 1995, Hokuto made her U.S. debut at the World War 3 pay-per-view event. Managed by Sonny Onoo, she teamed with Bull Nakano and defeated the team of Cutie Suzuki and Mayumi Ozaki. The same teams competed in a match on WCW Monday Nitro the following night, with Hokuto and Nakano winning again.

Hokuto and several other GAEA wrestlers, including Chigusa Nagayo, KAORU, Meiko Satomura, and Sonoko Kato, came to America to compete in a tournament to crown the first WCW Women's Champion. Hokuto competed in the first round of the tournament twice, using both the Akira Hokuto and Reina Jabuki gimmicks. As Reina Jabuki, she lost in the first round to Madusa Miceli. Due to this TV appearance, she was stripped of the CMLL title. As Akira Hokuto, she won the tournament, defeating Madusa in the finals, held at WCW's Starrcade on December 29, 1996, in Nashville, Tennessee. Hokuto later defeated Madusa at WCW's The Great American Bash on June 15, 1997, a match where Madusa was forced to 'retire' due to a stipulation. This was the last time Hokuto ever appeared in WCW and the Women's Championship was vacated shortly thereafter.

=== Gaea Japan (1996–2002) ===
In 1996, she left AJW and joined Chigusa Nagayo's new promotion, Gaea Japan. Unlike most Japanese women wrestlers, who retire when they marry and start a family, she returned to the ring in 1999 and won GAEA's AAAW Tag Team Championship in 2000 with Mayumi Ozaki. The year 2000 also saw her induction into the Wrestling Observer Newsletter Hall of Fame in recognition of her skill and contributions.

For her retirement match on April 7, 2002, Hokuto teamed up with Meiko Satomura to face Ayako Hamada and Chigusa Nagayo. Hokuto was wrestling with a broken rib, but, just as she had done so many times before, she defied the pain, and scored the pin on Hamada with the Northern Lights Bomb. In the post-match retirement ceremony, some of Hokuto's colleagues entered the ring, gave her flowers, hugged her, and bowed to her. She even slapped a few of them, including Satomura, and Sakura Hirota (slapping is considered a way to transfer part of her fighting spirit). This was followed by a ten-gong salute before Hokuto was showered with streamers. She then walked up the walkway where she was met by husband Kensuke Sasaki and their son.

=== Later Career (2002–2006) ===
Despite retiring in 2002, Hokuto has wrestled occasionally since then, including a 10-man tag team match for All Japan Pro Wrestling in 2004 where she teamed with her husband Sasaki, Genichiro Tenryu, Katsuhiko Nakajima and Kenshin to defeat RO&D (Jamal, Taiyo Kea, Buchanan, D-Lo Brown and Taka Michinoku). In her last match to date on February 11, 2006, at a Kensuke Office show, she took part in a battle royal where the winner would receive ¥120,000. The match was eventually won by Minoru Suzuki. She also served as the chief executive officer of Hawaii Championship Wrestling for a period of time during a Japan vs. Hawaii feud, as well as engaged in several squash matches against comedy wrestler Stalker Ichikawa, and became the first woman in history to compete in a match in All Japan Pro Wrestling against Kendo Kashin, a match that Hokuto won in just 3 minutes with the aid of outside interference.

== Personal life ==
Hokuto married Kensuke Sasaki on October 1, 1995, after Sasaki proposed to her on their first date. Hokuto became pregnant in early 1998 and gave birth to her first son, Kennosuke on November 6, 1998. Hokuto gave birth to her second son, Seinosuke in March 2003. In addition to their two biological children, Hokuto and Kensuke have formed a very strong, almost parental bond with Kensuke's protégé Katsuhiko Nakajima.

She appears as a playable wrestler in the 2007 video game Wrestle Kingdom 2.

While retired from active competition, Hokuto has stayed busy raising her family, helping her husband Kensuke run his Kensuke Office/Diamond Ring promotion, and making occasional appearances on Japanese radio and television.

Kensuke Sasaki and Akira Hokuto were voted one of Japan's leading celebrity couples in 2006. Hokuto has also assisted her husband in various publicity and charitable activities in his position as Japan's Friendship Ambassador to Fiji for the year 2007.

She has made various media appearances as a "mother celebrity". In 2010, for example, she appeared in a television commercial for "Mama Gohan" (lit. "Mama Meal"), a co-product by Ajinomoto and popular women's magazine I Love Mama, along with three female gyaru-mother models.

On September 23, 2015, Hokuto announced she had been diagnosed with breast cancer and was undergoing surgery the following day to have her right breast removed. The surgery was successful and will need several months to recuperate.

== Championships and accomplishments ==
- All Japan Women's Pro-Wrestling
  - AJW Junior Championship (1 time)
  - All Pacific Championship (2 times)
  - WWWA World Tag Team Championship (4 times) – with Yumiko Hotta (1), Suzuka Minami (2) and Mima Shimoda (1)
  - Japan Grand Prix (1993)
  - Tag League the Best (1988) – with Mika Suzuki
  - Tag League the Best (1993) – with Manami Toyota
  - AJW Hall of Fame (1998)
- Consejo Mundial de Lucha Libre
  - CMLL World Women's Championship (1 time)
- Gaea Japan
  - AAAW Tag Team Championship (1 time) – with Mayumi Ozaki
- Tokyo Sports
  - Special Award (1994)
  - Topic Award (2004)
- World Championship Wrestling
  - WCW Women's Championship (1 time)
  - WCW Women's Championship Tournament (1996)
- Wrestling Observer Newsletter
  - Wrestling Observer Newsletter Hall of Fame (Class of 2000)
