= Tanny Mouse =

Japanese professional wrestler (born 1976)

Personal information
- Born: January 7, 1976 (age 50) Tokyo, Japan

Professional wrestling career
- Ring name(s): Atrocious X #28; Benki Wo~man; Black Bullfight Sora; Etsuko Tanny; Generalissimo Tanny Mouse; Kyuketsu Nezumi Majo Devil Rat; Mina Taniyama; Tanny "Ai" Mouse; Tanny "Another Version" Mouse; Tanny Mouse
- Billed height: 160 cm (5 ft 3 in)
- Billed weight: 68 kg (150 lb)
- Debut: 1994
- Retired: 2010

Mina Taniyama (谷山 美奈, Taniyama Mina), better known by her ring name Tanny Mouse (タニー・マウス, Tanī Mausu) (born January 7, 1976), is a Japanese retired professional wrestler best known for her tenure with the defunct Japanese promotions NEO Japan Ladies Pro-Wrestling and All Japan Women's Pro-Wrestling.

== Professional wrestling career ==
=== All Japan Women's Pro-Wrestling (1994–1999, 2004–2005) ===
Taniyama made her professional wrestling debut in All Japan Women's Pro-Wrestling at a house show promoted on October 7, 1994, where she teamed up with Naomi Kato in a losing effort against Misae Watanabe and Emi Miyamoto in a tag team match. During her tenure with the promotion, she competed in one of its signature events, the Japan Grand Prix, making her only appearance at the 1997 edition where she fought in a block which also involved Kaoru Ito, Manami Toyota, Etsuko Mita, Mima Shimoda, Tomoko Watanabe, Yoshiko Tamura, Mariko Yoshida, Misae Genki, Kumiko Maekawa, Rie Tamada and Saya Endo. She is a former AJW Tag Team Champion, title which she has held once alongside her long time "Neo Machine Guns" tag team partner Yuki Miyazaki. She unsuccessfully competed for the AJW Junior Championship at AJW Zenjo Highest 1996 on April 13, in a losing effort against Yoshiko Tamura.

=== Ice Ribbon (2007–2010) ===
Taniyama shared a three-year tenure with Ice Ribbon. She made her debut at Ice Ribbon #4 on February 2, 2007, where she fell short to Choun Shiryu in an intergender match. She was a one-time International Ribbon Tag Team Champion, title which she won inaugurally alongside Yuki Miyazaki at Neo Ribbon Starting Over on April 4, 2007, by defeating Aya Yuki and Ran Yu-Yu in the inaugural tournament.

=== JWP Joshi Puroresu (1997–2010) ===
Taniyama shared a thirteen-year tenure with JWP Joshi Puroresu, promotion in which she competed as a freelancer. She made her debut at a house show promoted on October 10, 1997, where she teamed up with Tomoko Miyaguchi in a losing effort against Tomoko Kuzumi and Yoshiko Tamura. She once competed in the Natsu Onna Kettei Tournament on the 2010 edition, where she teamed up with Kayoko Haruyama in a losing effort against Command Bolshoi and Kaori Yoneyama. During her tenure with the company, she competed at various notable events. At JWP Climax 2010 on December 23, she fought in the traditional Christmas battle royal won by Hailey Hatred and also involving Hikaru Shida, Kazuki, Mima Shimoda, Senri Kuroki, Toshie Uematsu and others.

=== NEO Japan Ladies Pro-Wrestling (1998–2010) ===
Taniyama is best known for her tenure with NEO Japan Ladies Pro-Wrestling. She made her debut at Neo Ladies First Kiss on January 9, 1998, where she competed in a three-way match won by Yuka Shiina and also involving Saya Endo.

During her time in the promotion, she competed in various notable events. At NEO The Last Holy Fight In Itabashi Vol. 2 on December 12, 2010, she competed in a battle royal won by Yoshiko Tamura and also involving various notable opponents, both male and female such as Megumi Yabushita, DJ Nira, Hamuko Hoshi, Kagetsu, Kana, Kaori Yoneyama, Nagisa Nozaki, Riho, Mika Iida, Toshie Uematsu and many others. Taniyama wrestled her last match at NEO Stage Door on December 31, 2010, the last event of NEO Japan Ladies Pro-Wrestling before closure where she teamed up with Yuki Miyazaki to defeat Kayoko Haruyama and Toshie Uematsu. It was also her last match in professional wrestling.

== Championships and accomplishments ==
- All Japan Women's Pro-Wrestling
  - AJW Tag Team Championship (1 time) – with Yuki Miyazaki
- DDT Pro-Wrestling
  - Ironman Heavymetalweight Championship (5 times)
- Ice Ribbon
  - International Ribbon Tag Team Championship (1 time, inaugural) – with Yuki Miyazaki
- NEO Japan Ladies Pro-Wrestling
  - NEO Tag Team Championship (2 times, final) – with Yuki Miyazaki
  - NEO Kitazawa Tag Team Championship (4 times) – with Yuki Miyazaki
  - NEO Itabashi Tag Team Champion (6 times) – with Yuki Miyazaki
  - AWF World Women's Championship (1 time)
  - Mid Summer Tag Tournament (2002, 2004)
  - NEO Hall Of Fame (2010)
