= AJW Junior Championship =

Professional wrestling women's championship

Details
- Promotion: All Japan Women's Pro-Wrestling
- Date established: January 4, 1980
- Date retired: April 2005
Statistics
- First champion: Rimi Yokota
- Final champion: Rena Takase
- Most reigns: Chaparita Asari; Chigusa Nagayo and Yumi Ogura (2 times)

The AJW Junior Championship was a tertiary singles title in All Japan Women's Pro-Wrestling. The title started in 1980 and was retired in April 2005 when the promotion closed.

The prize was originally contested among wrestlers under the age of 20, but in 1993, they changed it to wrestlers with less than two years of experience in professional wrestling. The first belt design was a brown belt that also represented the AJW Championship. Later, the Junior Championship became a golden belt with a turquoise strap.

== Title history ==
Key
No.	Overall reign number
Reign	Reign number for the specific champion
Days	Number of days held

No.	Champion	Championship change			Reign statistics		Notes	Ref.
No.	Champion	Date	Event	Location	Reign	Days	Notes	Ref.
1	Rimi Yokota	January 4, 1980	N/A	Tokyo, Japan	1	(Note: The exact date that the championship was vacated is unknown, meaning the reign lasted between 210 and 240 days.)	Yokota defeated Chino Sato to become the inaugural champion.	
—	Vacated	August 1980	—	—	—	—	The championship was vacated for undocumented reasons.	
2	Tomoko Kitamura	January 4, 1981	N/A	Tokyo, Japan	1	(Note: The exact date that the championship was vacated is unknown, meaning the reign lasted between 362 and 392 days.)	Kitamura defeated Noriko Kawakami to win the vacant championship.	
—	Vacated	January 1982	—	—	—	—	The championship was vacated for undocumented reasons.	
3	Chigusa Nagayo	May 15, 1982	N/A	Ōmiya, Satima, Japan	1	87	Nagayo defeated Itsuki Yamazaki to win the vacant championship.	
4	Noriyo Tateno	August 10, 1982	N/A	Fukushima, Japan	1	516		
5	Chigusa Nagayo	January 8, 1984	Live event	Tokyo, Japan	2	<1		
—	Vacated	January 8, 1984	—	—	—	—	The championship was vacated for undocumented reasons.	
6	Yumi Ogura	March 17, 1984	N/A	Kiryū, Gunma, Japan	1	180	Ogura defeated Keiko Nakano to win the vacant championship.	
7	Keiko Nakano	September 13, 1984	N/A	Toda, Saitama, Japan	1	(Note: The length of the championship reign is too uncertain to calculate.)		
—	Vacated	1985	—	—	—	—	The championship was vacated for undocumented reasons.	
8	Yumi Ogura	April 7, 1985	N/A	Tokyo, Japan	2	249	Ogura defeated Mika Komatsu in a tournament final to win the vacant championship.	
—	Vacated	December 12, 1985	—	—	—	—	Yumi Ogura vacated the championship in order to train for the AJW Championship.	
9	Condor Saito	January 4, 1986	N/A	Tokyo, Japan	1	75	Saito defeated Kazue Nagahori to win the vacant championship.	
10	Hisako Uno	March 20, 1986	N/A	Osaka, Japan	1	70		
11	Yasuko Ishiguro	May 29, 1986	N/A	Ōmiya, Satima, Japan	1	220		
—	Vacated	January 4, 1987	—	—	—	—	The championship was vacated for undocumented reasons.	
12	Kyoko Asoh	February 26, 1987	N/A	Kawasaki, Kanagawa, Japan	1	227	Asoh defeated Megumi Kudo to win the vacant championship.	
—	Vacated	October 11, 1987	—	—	—	—	The championship was vacated upon Kyoko Asoh's retirement.	
13	Mika Suzuki	December 26, 1987	N/A	Tokyo, Japan	1	141	Suzuki defeated Kaoru Maeda in a tournament final to win the vacant championship.	
—	Vacated	May 15, 1988	—	—	—	—	The championship was vacated for undocumented reasons.	
14	Toshiyo Yamada	July 19, 1988	N/A	Tokyo, Japan	1	(Note: The exact date that the championship was vacated is unknown, meaning the reign lasted between 44 and 73 days.)	Yamada defeated Miori Kamiya in a tournament final to win the vacant championship.	
—	Vacated	September 1988	—	—	—	—	The championship was vacated after Toshiyo Yamada suffered an injury.	
15	Reibun Amada	December 11, 1988	N/A	Tokyo, Japan	1		Amada defeated Manami Toyota to win the vacant championship.	
—	Vacated	1989	—	—	—	—	The championship was vacated for undocumented reasons.	
16	Mima Shimoda	October 8, 1989	N/A	Tokyo, Japan	1		Shimoda defeated Asayo Obata to win the vacant championship.	
—	Vacated	N/A	—	—	—	—	The championship was vacated for undocumented reasons.	
17	Yuki Lee	March 20, 1992	N/A	Tokyo, Japan	1	2	Lee defeated Akemi Torisu in a tournament final to win the vacant championship.	
—	Vacated	March 22, 1992	—	—	—	—	The championship was vacated after Yuki Lee suffered an injury.	
18	Akemi Torisu	April 29, 1992	N/A	Toda, Saitama, Japan	1	103	Torisu defeated won a tournament to win the vacant championship.	
19	Rie Tamada	August 10, 1992	N/A	Okazaki, Aichi, Japan	1	36		
20	Kumiko Maekawa	September 15, 1992	N/A	Japan	1	269		
21	Numatchi	June 11, 1993	N/A	Japan	1	110		
22	Mizuki Endo	September 29, 1993	AJW/LLPW Nagoya Super Whirlwing ~ Zenjo VS. LLPW Total Opposition War - Day 20	Nagoya, Aichi, Japan	1	60		
23	Chaparita ASARI	November 28, 1993	N/A	Osaka, Japan	1	8		
24	Candy Okutsu	December 6, 1993	N/A	Tokyo, Japan	1	475		
25	Chaparita Asari	March 26, 1995	Wrestling Queendom Victory	Yokohama, Kanagawa, Japan	2	(Note: The exact date that the championship was vacated is unknown, meaning the reign lasted between 36 and 66 days.)		
—	Vacated	May 1995	—	—	—	—	The championship was vacated for undocumented reasons.	
26	Yoshiko Tamura	June 27, 1995	Zenjo Movement - Day 40	Sapporo, Hokkaido, Japan	1	432	Tamura defeated Misae Watanabe in a tournament final to win the vacant championship.	
27	Tomoko Miyaguchi	September 1, 1996	The Rising Generation Queens Carnival	Tokyo, Japan	1	(Note: The exact date that the championship was vacated is unknown, meaning the reign lasted between 153 and 180 days.)		
—	Vacated	February 1997	—	—	—	—	The championship was vacated after Tomoko Miyaguchi suffered an injury.	
28	Momoe Nakanishi	March 23, 1997	N/A	Sendai, Miyagi, Japan	1	(Note: The exact date that the championship was vacated is unknown, meaning the reign lasted between 253 and 283 days.)	Nakanishi defeated Nanae Takahashi to win the vacant championship.	
—	Vacated	December 1997	—	—	—	—	The championship was vacated for undocumented reasons.	
29	Mika Nishio	September 15, 2002	JWP Shinjuku Valkyrie's Kiss vol. 2	Tokyo, Japan	1	98	Nishio defeated Kaori Yoneyama and Rena Takase in a three-way round-robin tournament final to win the vacant championship.	
30	Rena Takase	December 22, 2002	Real All-Womanism Dream Explosion ~ Kawasaki Part 2 ~	Kawasaki, Kanagawa, Japan	1	(Note: The exact date that the championship was deactivated is unknown, meaning the reign lasted between 831 and 860 days.)		
—	Deactivated	April 2005	—	—	—	—	The championship retired when AJW closed.	

== Combined reigns ==
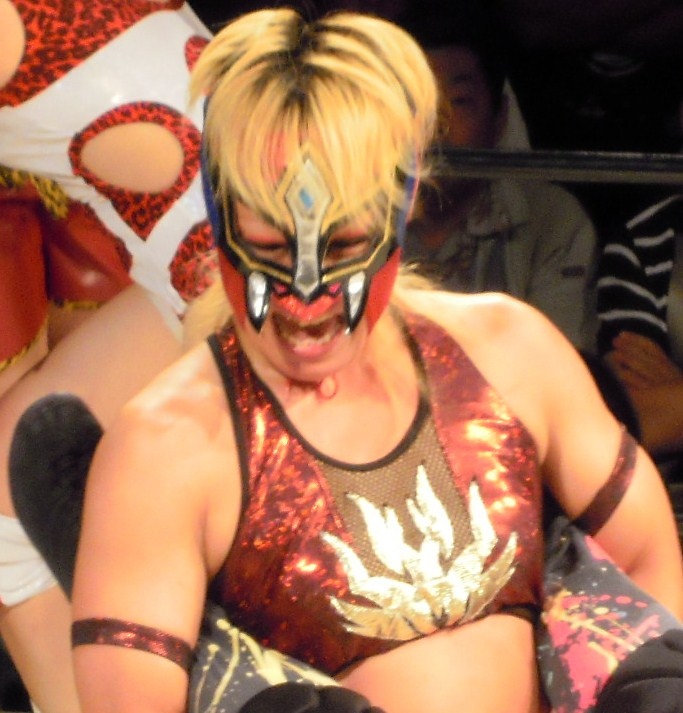
One-time, last and longest reigning AJW Junior Champion Rena Takase

¤	The exact length of a title reign is uncertain; the combined length may not be correct.
N/A	The exact length of a title reign is too uncertain to calculate.

Rank	Wrestler	No. of reigns	Combined days
1	Rena Takase	1	831 – 860¤
2	Noriyo Tateno	1	516
3	Candy Okutsu	1	475
4	Yoshiko Tamura	1	432
5	Yumi Ogura	2	429
6	Tomoko Kitamura	1	362 – 392¤
7	Kumiko Maekawa	1	269
8	Momoe Nakanishi	1	253 – 283¤
9	Kyoko Asoh	1	227
10	Yasuko Ishiguro	1	220
11	Rimi Yokota	1	210 – 240¤
12	Tomoko Miyaguchi	1	153 – 180¤
13	Mika Suzuki	1	141
14	Numatchi	1	110
15	Akemi Torisu	1	103
16	Mika Nishio	1	98
17	Chigusa Nagayo	2	87
18	Condor Saito	1	75
19	Hisako Uno	1	70
20	Mizuki Endo	1	60
21	Chaparita ASARI	2	44 – 74¤
21	Toshiyo Yamada	1	44 – 73¤
23	Rie Tamada	1	36
24	Yuki Lee	1	2
-	Keiko Nakano	1	N/A
-	Mima Shimoda	1	N/A
-	Reibun Amada	1	N/A

== See also ==
- List of professional wrestling promotions in Japan
- List of women's wrestling promotions
- Professional wrestling in Japan
