= NEO Japan Ladies Pro-Wrestling =

Japanese women's professional wrestling promotion

- Official logo of the promotion
- Acronym: NEO
- Founded: 1997
- Defunct: 2010
- Style: Joshi Puroresu
- Headquarters: Yokohama, Kanagawa, Japan
- Founder: Kyoko Inoue
- Split from: All Japan Women's Pro-Wrestling
- Successor: World Woman Pro-Wrestling Diana

Neo Japan Ladies Pro-Wrestling (ネオ・ジャパン・レディース・プロレスリング, Neo Japan Redīzu Puroresuringu; frequently shortened to Neo Ladies and styled as NEO) was a joshi puroresu (women's professional wrestling) promotion established in 1997 by Kyoko Inoue. The first event took place on January 9, 1998.

== NEO Japan Ladies Pro-Wrestling ==
NEO Japan Ladies Pro-Wrestling was founded during All Japan Women's Pro-Wrestling financial struggles. The figurehead of the company was Kyoko Inoue, a former All Japan Women's Pro-Wrestling wrestler. The name was meant to reference the "Japan Women's Pro-Wrestling" part of the name for All Japan Women's Pro Wrestling. The group was pegged with problems from the beginning as the group was initially supposed to be called New Japan Women's Pro Wrestling, but due to copyright concerns, NEO was chosen instead.

Their first show on January 9, 1998, featured the 9 members of the roster wrestling multiple times due to the small roster. The main event of the first show featured Las Cachorras Orientales of Etsuko Mita and Mima Shimoda teaming with Saya Endo to defeat Chaparita Asari, Kyoko Inoue and Yoshiko Tamura.

During Spring 1998, Kyoko Inoue feuded with Lioness Asuka. Kyoko captured Lioness' TWF title on April 26, 1998. The feud carried over to NEO, where they met in a singles match on May 6, 1998, for JDStar's TWF Title, in which Asuka won the title back. In August 1998, Nicole Bass toured with the promotion, defeating Etsuko Mita, Chaparita ASARI, and Kyoko Inoue on August 16, 1998.

On October 29, 1998, the promotion featured a match between Kyoko Inoue and Aja Kong for Kyoko Inoue's 10th anniversary as a wrestler.

During Summer 1999, the promotion feuded with JWP and All Japan Women's Pro-Wrestling, resulting in multiple inter-promotional matches. On July 11, 1999, Kyoko Inoue captured the WWWA World Single Championship of All Japan Women's, defeating Yumiko Hotta. The two had a rematch at a NEO event on October 22, 1999, with Hotta winning the title back.

The original incarnation of the promotion only lasted until January 6, 2000, less than two years after its first show. The last show featured Kyoko Inoue wrestling in every match on the card.

== NEO Women's Wrestling ==
NEO renamed itself to NEO Women's Wrestling (NEO女子プロレス, Neo Joshi Puroresu) after NEO Japan Ladies Pro-Wrestling closed in 2000. The promotion's pre-debut show was on March 16, 2000, and their official debut was on May 31, 2000. The promotion regularly held events at Itabashi Green Hall in Itabashi, Tokyo, due to its smaller size, while running Korakuen Hall for bigger events.

The promotion rose to power in 2005 after the closure of All Japan Women's Pro Wrestling and Gaea Japan, with NEO being considered by many to be the top joshi puroresu promotion during this time. In 2007, founder Kyoko Inoue had complications from her pregnancy and was unable to wrestle, which hurt the promotion.

In 2009, business declined when two of their top stars, Etsuko Mita and idol wrestler Haruka Matsuo retired.

The promotion announced its closure on May 5, 2010. Kyoko Inoue announced her resignation, Yoshiko Tamura, Tanny Mouse, and Yuki Miyazaki were slated to retire, young wrestlers Aoi Ishibashi and Natsumi Kawano had already left the company and the roster would have only been left with three wrestlers, due to the companies struggles with finding new talent. The company held their final show on December 31, 2010. The first main event featured Ayumi Kurihara capturing her long-awaited first major singles title by defeating Yoshiko Tamura for the NWA Women's Pacific/NEO Single Championship, and the second main event featured the remaining members of the NEO roster competing in a 10-minute time limit trios match.

== Titles ==
=== NEO Japan Ladies Pro-Wrestling ===
Championship	Final champion(s)	Reign	Date won	Previous champion(s)
NWA Women's Pacific/NEO Single Championship	Ayumi Kurihara	1	May 25, 2011	Yoshiko Tamura
High Speed Championship	Leon	1	November 27, 2010	Natsuki☆Taiyo
NEO Tag Team Championship	NEO Machine Guns (Tanny Mouse and Yuki Miyazaki)	2	November 28, 2010	Aya Yuuki and Ryo Mizunami
NEO Itabashi Tag Team Championship	Chiharu and Yuka Nakamura	1 (2, 2)	December 23, 2004	Tanny Mouse and Yuki Miyazaki
NEO Kitazawa Tag Team Championship	Tanny Mouse and Yuki Miyazaki	4	October 4, 2004	Etsuko Mita and Kyoko Inoue

=== International Wrestling Association of Japan ===
Championship	Final champion	Reign	Date won	Previous champion
AWF World Women's Championship	Tanny Mouse	1	June 26, 2004	Misae Genki

== Alumni ==
- Azumi Hyuga
- Ayako Sato
- Kyoko Inoue
- Kiyoko Ichiki
- Etsuko Mita
- Mima Shimoda
- Kazumi Shimouma
- Yoshiko Tamura
- Chaparita Asari
- Misae Genki
- Haruka Matsuo
- Saya Endo

- Tanny Mouse
- Tomoko Watanabe
- Yuki Miyazaki
- Yuka Shiina
- Nozomi Dai
- Natsumi Kawano
- Mika Iida
- Aya Yuuki
- Nagisa Nozaki
- Nicole Bass

== NEO Hall of Fame ==
#	Year	Ring name (Real name)^{[a]}	Inducted for	Notes^{[b]}
1	2005	Chaparita Asari (Masami Watanabe)	Wrestling	
2	2005	Tomiko Sai	Wrestling	Won the NEO Itabashi Tag Team Championship (1 time)
3	2005	Yu Tanabe	Wrestling	
4	2005	Junko Nagura		
5	2010	Etsuko Mita	Wrestling	Won the NWA Women's Pacific/NEO Single Championship (1 time), NEO Tag Team Championship (1 time), NEO Kitazawa Tag Team Championship (1 time), and NEO Itabashi Tag Team Championship (1 time)
6	2010	Yuka Shiina	Wrestling	Won the NEO Kitazawa Tag Team Championship (1 time)
7	2010	Misae Genki (Misae Watanabe)	Wrestling	Won the NWA Women's Pacific/NEO Single Championship (3 times) and NEO Tag Team Championship (2 times)
8	2010	Azumi Hyuga (Tomoko Kuzumi)	Wrestling	Won the NWA Women's Pacific/NEO Single Championship (1 time)
9	2010	Yuka Nakamura	Wrestling	Won the NEO Tag Team Championship (2 times) and NEO Itabashi Tag Team Championship (1 time)
10	2010	Haruka Matsuo	Wrestling	Won the NEO Tag Team Championship (2 times) and NEO Itabashi Tag Team Championship (1 time)
11	2010	Megumi Asano	Refereeing	
12	2010	Katsuhiro Nagata	Wrestling	
13	2010	Yoshiko Tamura	Wrestling	Won the NEO Tag Team Championship (3 times)
14	2010	Tanny Mouse (Mina Taniyama)	Wrestling	Won the NEO Tag Team Championship (2 times), NEO Kitazawa Tag Team Championship (4 times), and NEO Itabashi Tag Team Championship (6 times)
15	2010	Yuki Miyazaki	Wrestling	Won the NEO Tag Team Championship (2 times), NEO Kitazawa Tag Team Championship (4 times), and NEO Itabashi Tag Team Championship (6 times)

== Footnotes ==
- ^{a} – Entries without a birth name indicate that the inductee did not perform under a ring name.
- ^{b} – This section mainly lists the major accomplishments of each inductee in the NEO promotion.
