= NEO Tag Team Championship =

Professional wrestling women's tag team championship

Details
- Promotion: NEO Japan Ladies Pro-Wrestling
- Date established: August 21, 2005
- Date retired: December 31, 2010
Statistics
- First champions: Amazing Kong and Haruka Matsuo
- Final champions: NEO Machine Guns (Tanny Mouse and Yuki Miyazaki)
- Most reigns: As a team:NEO Machine Guns (Tanny Mouse and Yuki Miyazaki) (2 reigns); As individual:Yoshiko Tamura (3 reigns)
- Longest reign: NEO Machine Guns (Tanny Mouse and Yuki Miyazaki) (294 days)
- Shortest reign: Emi Sakura and Yoshiko Tamura (11 days)

The NEO Tag Team Championship was the primary tag team title in the Japanese professional wrestling promotion NEO Japan Ladies Pro-Wrestling. The title was introduced in 2005 and was retired in December 2010 when the promotion closed. There have been a total of fourteen reigns shared between thirteen teams consisting of nineteen distinctive champions and no vacancies.

== Title history ==
Key
No.	Overall reign number
Reign	Reign number for the specific team—reign numbers for the individuals are in parentheses, if different
Days	Number of days held

No.	Champion	Championship change			Reign statistics		Notes	Ref.
No.	Champion	Date	Event	Location	Reign	Days	Notes	Ref.
1	Amazing Kong and Haruka Matsuo	August 21, 2005	N/A	Tokyo, Japan	1	28	Kong and Matsuo were billed as the inaugural champions under unknown circumstances.	
2	Etsuko Mita and Kyoko Inoue	September 18, 2005	NEO Brace Up 2005	Tokyo, Japan	1	302		
3	Amazing Kong (2) and Kyoko Kimura	July 17, 2006	NEO Summer Stampede 2006	Tokyo, Japan	1	109		
4	Haruka Matsuo (2) and Misae Genki	November 3, 2006	NEO Stand Out 2006	Tokyo, Japan	1	255		
5	Emi Sakura and Yoshiko Tamura	July 16, 2007	NEO Summer Stampede 2007	Tokyo, Japan	1	11		
6	Ayako Hamada and Kaoru Ito	July 27, 2007	NEO Summer Stampede in Ueda	Ueda, Japan	1	100		
7	Misae Genki (2) and Yoshiko Tamura (2)	November 4, 2007	NEO Stand Out 2007	Tokyo, Japan	1	119		
8	NEO Machine Guns (Tanny Mouse and Yuki Miyazaki)	March 2, 2008	NEO Climb Over	Tokyo, Japan	1	255		
9	Atsuko Emoto and Kyoko Kimura (2)	November 12, 2008	NEO Grand Final 2008	Tokyo, Japan	1	137		
10	Hiroyo Matsumoto and Kyoko Inoue (2)	March 29, 2009	NEO Sunday Project In Ishioka Part 2	Ibaraki, Japan	1	195		
11	Passion Red (Kana and Nanae Takahashi)	October 10, 2009	NEO Take Action	Tokyo, Japan	1	82		
12	Tamukuri (Ayumi Kurihara and Yoshiko Tamura (3))	December 31, 2009	NEO Joshi Puroresu Carnival 2009	Tokyo, Japan	1	317		
13	Aya Yuuki and Ryo Mizunami	November 13, 2010	NEO Storm 2010	Tokyo, Japan	1	15		
14	NEO Machine Guns (Tanny Mouse and Yuki Miyazaki)	November 28, 2010	NEO The Last Holy Fight In KINEMA	Tokyo, Japan	2	33		
—	Deactivated	December 31, 2010	—	—	—	—	The championships were retired when NEO Japan Ladies Pro-Wrestling closed.	

== Combined reigns ==
=== By team ===
Rank	Team	No. of reigns	Combined days
1	NEO Machine Guns (Tanny Mouse and Yuki Miyazaki)	2	327
2	Tamukuri (Ayumi Kurihara and Yoshiko Tamura)	1	317
3	Etsuko Mita and Kyoko Inoue	1	302
4	Haruka Matsuo and Misae Genki	1	255
5	Hiroyo Matsumoto and Kyoko Inoue	1	195
6	Misae Genki and Yoshiko Tamura	1	119
7	Amazing Kong and Kyoko Kimura	1	109
8	Ayako Hamada and Kaoru Ito	1	100
9	Atsuko Emoto and Kyoko Kimura	1	98
10	Passion Red (Kana and Nanae Takahashi)	1	82
11	Amazing Kong and Haruka Matsuo	1	28
12	Aya Yuuki and Ryo Mizunami	1	15
13	Emi Sakura and Yoshiko Tamura	1	11

=== By wrestler ===
Rank	Wrestler	No. of reigns	Combined days
1	Kyoko Inoue	2	497
2	Yoshiko Tamura	3	447
3	Misae Genki	2	374
4	Tanny Mouse	2	327
4	Yuki Miyazaki	2	327
6	Ayumi Kurihara	1	317
7	Etsuko Mita	1	302
8	Haruka Matsuo	2	283
9	Kyoko Kimura	2	207
10	Hiroyo Matsumoto	1	195
11	Amazing Kong	2	137
12	Ayako Hamada	1	100
12	Kaoru Ito	1	100
14	Atsuko Emoto	1	98
15	Kana	1	82
15	Nanae Takahashi	1	82
17	Aya Yuuki	1	15
17	Ryo Mizunami	1	15
19	Emi Sakura	1	11

== See also ==
- List of professional wrestling promotions in Japan
- List of women's wrestling promotions
- Professional wrestling in Japan
