= NWA Women's Pacific/NEO Single Championship =

Professional wrestling women's championship

NWA Women's Pacific Championship/NEO Single Championship

Details
- Promotion: National Wrestling Alliance; NEO Japan Ladies Pro-Wrestling
- Date established: August 24, 2000
- Date retired: May 25, 2011
Statistics
- First champion: Yoshiko Tamura
- Final champion: Ayumi Kurihara
- Most reigns: Yoshiko Tamura (7 times)
- Longest reign: Yoshiko Tamura (645 days)
- Shortest reign: Emi Sakura (2 days)

The NWA Women's Pacific/NEO Single Championship was a women's professional wrestling championship contested primarily in NEO Japan Ladies Pro-Wrestling.

Being a professional wrestling championship, it was not won via direct competition; it was instead won via a predetermined ending to a match or awarded to a wrestler because of a wrestling angle. The championship was represented by two belts: the National Wrestling Alliance Women's Pacific Championship, designed in the style of the men's world title's 10 Pounds of Gold design, and the NEO Single Championship, whose design was based on the Big Gold Belt.

There were a total of 23 reigns by 13 wrestlers. The first champion was Yoshiko Tamura, who defeated Nicole Bass to win the title. The title was retired on May 25, 2011, after NEO had closed its doors.

== Title history ==
Key
No.	Overall reign number
Reign	Reign number for the specific champion
Days	Number of days held
Defenses	Number of successful defenses

No.	Champion	Championship change			Reign statistics			Notes	Ref.
No.	Champion	Date	Event	Location	Reign	Days	Defenses	Notes	Ref.
1	Yoshiko Tamura	August 24, 2000	NWA live event	Wildwood, NJ	1	171	3	Tamura defeated Nicole Bass to become the inaugural NWA Pacific Women's champion, and was awarded the NEO belt upon returning to Japan.	
2	Mima Shimoda	February 11, 2001	Bright Daylight	Tokyo, Japan	1	42	1		
3	Kyoko Inoue	March 25, 2001	Holiday Visitor	Tokyo, Japan	1	82	1		
4	Misae Genki	June 15, 2001	Friday Night War	Tokyo, Japan	1	78	1		
5	Lioness Asuka	September 1, 2001	Summer Vacation doesn't End	Tokyo, Japan	1	97	1		
6	Yoshiko Tamura	December 7, 2001	Century	Tokyo, Japan	2	127	3	This was a six-way elimination match, also involving Kyoko Inoue, Mima Shimoda, Misae Genki and Ran Yu-Yu.	
7	Etsuko Mita	April 13, 2002	Entertainment	Tokyo, Japan	1	56	0		
8	Yoshiko Tamura	June 8, 2002	Final Answer	Tokyo, Japan	3	128	2		
—	Vacated	October 14, 2002	Legend has Already Started ~ Korakuen Count Down 2 ~	Tokyo, Japan	—	—	—	The Heel stable nEo stole all the title belts.	
9	Yoshiko Tamura	November 10, 2002	Cosmos	Tokyo, Japan	4	84	0	Tamura defeated Kyoko Inoue and Mima Shimoda in a three-way match in the tournament finals to win the vacant championship.	
10	Kyoko Inoue	February 2, 2003	Carry on My Way	Tokyo, Japan	2	32	0	This was a Two out of three falls match.	
11	Azumi Hyuga	March 6, 2003	Carry on My Way	Tokyo, Japan	1	60	3		
12	Yoshiko Tamura	May 5, 2003	NEO Mania ~ Chaparita Asari Retirement Show ~	Tokyo, Japan	5	314	3		
13	Momoe Nakanishi	March 14, 2004	Dream Rush	Kawasaki, Kanagawa, Japan	1	153	2		
14	Misae Genki	August 14, 2004	Summer Stampede	Tokyo, Japan	2	190	3		
15	Tsubasa Kuragaki	February 20, 2005	We Are NEO! - Day 5	Tokyo, Japan	1	133	2		
16	Misae Genki	July 3, 2005	Summer Stampede	Tokyo, Japan	3	161	3		
17	Yoshiko Tamura	December 11, 2005	Stand Out	Tokyo, Japan	6	645	15		
18	Haruka Matsuo	September 17, 2007	Beat Up	Tokyo, Japan	1	231	2		
19	Kyoko Inoue	May 5, 2008	May History	Tokyo, Japan	3	152	0		
20	Nanae Takahashi	October 4, 2008	Kyoko Inoue's 20th Anniversary Show "NEO Dream 2008 ~ it's Good to See a Dream that Never Ends, But Try to Draw a New One"	Tokyo, Japan	1	211	2		
21	Emi Sakura	May 3, 2009	Passion Red 2Passion	Tokyo, Japan	1	2	0	Sakura won the championship when Nanae Takahashi was legitimately knocked out during the match.	
22	Yoshiko Tamura	May 5, 2009	May History	Tokyo, Japan	7	605	12		
23	Ayumi Kurihara	December 31, 2010	Stage Door	Tokyo, Japan	1	145	0		
—	Deactivated	May 25, 2011	—	Tokyo, Japan	—	—	—	NEO closes on December 31, 2010. Ayumi Kurihara keeps the title, but vacates it on this day and the title is retired.	

== Combined reigns ==
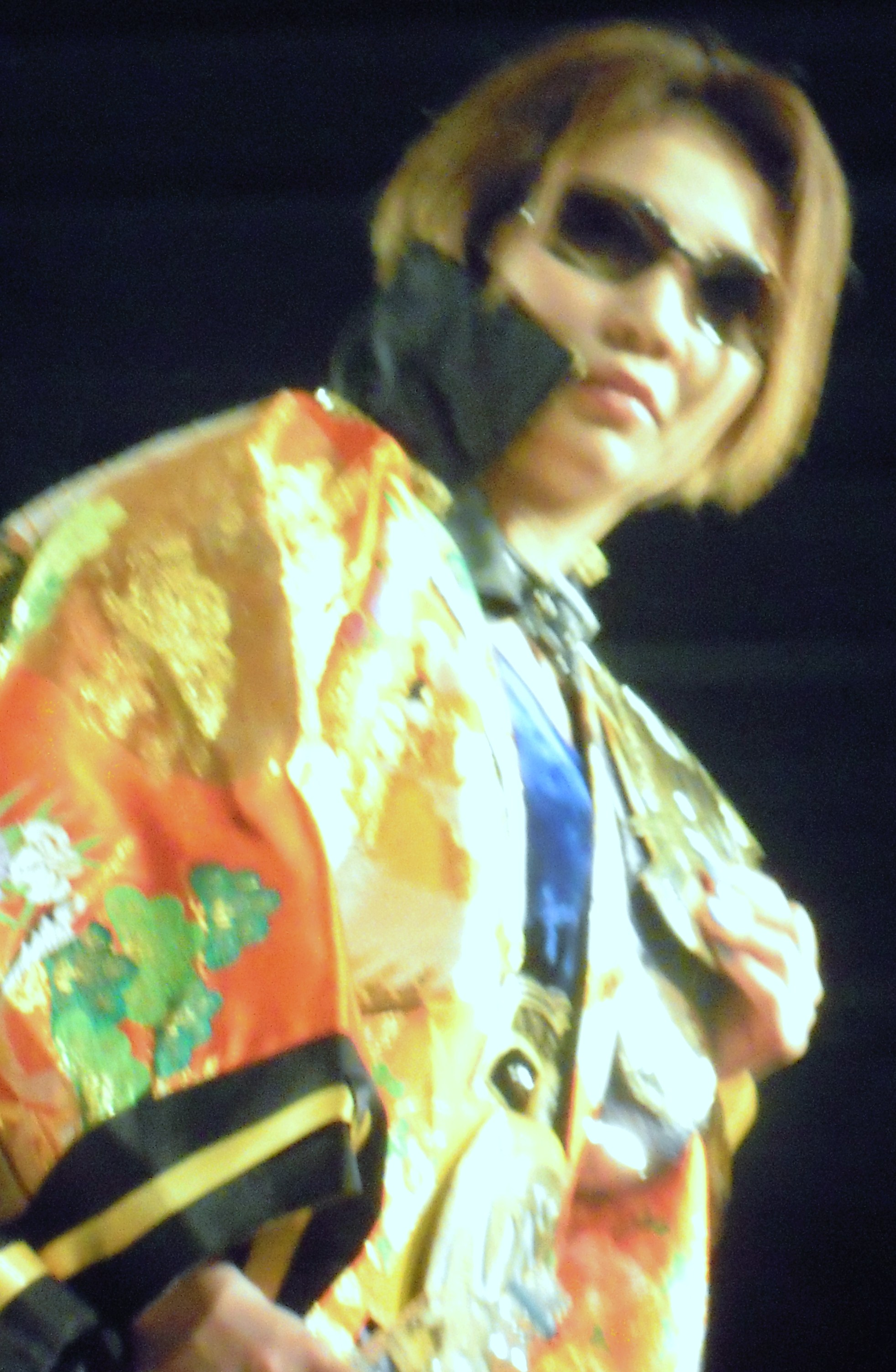
Record seven-time champion, inaugural and the longest reigning champion Yoshiko Tamura

Rank	Wrestler	No. of reigns	Combined defenses	Combined days
1	Yoshiko Tamura	7	38	2,074
2	Misae Genki	3	7	429
3	Kyoko Inoue	3	1	265
4	Haruka Matsuo	1	2	231
5	Nanae Takahashi	1	2	211
6	Momoe Nakanishi	1	2	153
7	Ayumi Kurihara	1	0	145
8	Tsubasa Kuragaki	1	2	133
9	Lioness Asuka	1	1	97
10	Azumi Hyuga	1	3	60
11	Etsuko Mita	1	0	56
12	Mima Shimoda	1	1	42
13	Emi Sakura	1	0	2
