= Ayumi Kurihara =

Japanese professional wrestler

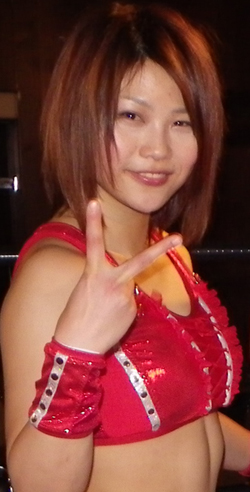
- Kurihara in April 2010

Personal information
- Born: Ayumi Kurihara; July 13, 1984 (age 42) Mitaka, Tokyo
- Spouse: Yoshi-Hashi

Professional wrestling career
- Ring name(s): Ayumi Kurihara; Ayumi; A☆YU☆MI; A★YU★MI
- Billed height: 1.65 m (5 ft 5 in)
- Billed weight: 57 kg (126 lb)
- Trained by: Mariko Yoshida; Akino; Michiko Omukai; Gami
- Debut: April 24, 2005
- Retired: August 4, 2013

Ayumi Kurihara (栗原 亜弓, Kurihara Ayumi; ring name: 栗原 あゆみ) (born July 13, 1984) is a retired joshi puroresu wrestler best known for her tenures with Pro Wrestling Wave and NEO Japan Ladies Pro-Wrestling.

== Professional wrestling career ==
Kurihara entered training with the women's pro wrestling promotion AtoZ and then transferred to M's Style, where she learned the craft from well-known Japanese female wrestlers Gami, Mariko Yoshida, Akino, and Michiko Omukai. Kurihara debuted in 2005, at the age of 20. In a "1 Day Tournament" Kurihara had her professional debut and defeated Gami when she reversed a pin attempt into a roll-up. She then lost her following tournament match when Toshie Uematsu beat her with a flying body press. M's Style closed in the fall of 2006. The final match was a six-person tag match, pitting Tojuki Leon, Bullfight Sora and Kurihara against Akino, Ohmukai and Yoshida. The younger generation won the match. Since then, Kurihara has wrestled as a freelancer, in Neo, JWP Project, JDStar, Ibuki and Pro Wrestling Sun. Near the end of her tenure in M's Style, Kurihara incorporated a stronger finishing move to her moveset. Ohmukai was shown teaching her how to perform a uranage, which she then went on to use in a tag victory with Ohmukai against Ayako Hamada and Cherry. In December 2006, Kurihara wrestled Shuu Shibutani in a special show geared toward the upcoming generation of wrestlers. The fans voted the match the best of the night and both women received trophies.

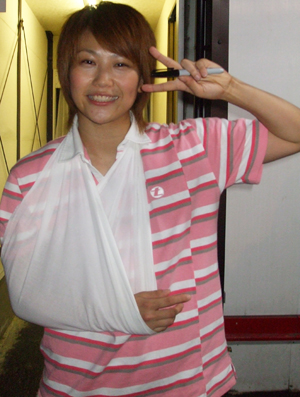
Kurihara in 2007 after she broke her clavicle

On July 16, 2007, at the Pro Wrestling NEO "Summer Stampede '07" show in Korakuen Hall, while teaming alongside Shuu Shibutani versus Aoi Kizuki and Nagisa Nozaki, Kurihara broke her clavicle receiving a hard flying clothesline by Kizuki. Kurihara finished the match, hitting three more missile dropkicks before scoring the pinfall. She returned to action on December 9, 2007, to compete in the main event tag match in Michiko Ohmukai's retirement show, but re-aggravated her injury causing her to need surgery. On December 20, 2007, Kurihara underwent the surgery in which the doctor removed bone and bone marrow from her hip to use to reconstruct her clavicle along with a titanium plate and screws.

Around mid-March 2008 Kurihara began light training again with Mariko Yoshida and in the U-FILE Dojo. Her return to action was scheduled for December 14, 2008 at Tokyo Shinjuku Face for her personally produced show titled "Starting☆Over." At her event she wrestled twice, first in the opening bout victory against Shuu Shibutani and then in main event 2/3 Falls Tag Team match where she teamed with Natsuki☆Taiyo against veterans Akino and Nanae Takahashi. In August 2009 Kurihara traveled to Mexico City, Mexico to participate in Ultimo Dragon's Dragonmania IV show on August 25, 2009, in Arena México. She also participated in some smaller independent events while in Mexico and debuted a new costume with a mask, calling herself A☆YU☆MI. Kurihara teamed with Yoshiko Tamura to challenge Nanae Takahashi and Kana for the NEO tag team championships on December 31, 2009, in Korakuen Hall. This was the first championship of Kurihara's career. In February 2010 it was announced that Kurihara and several other joshi wrestlers would be appearing for Shimmer Women Athletes pro wrestling in Berywn, Illinois on their March shows. Kurihara also appeared for Jersey All Pro Wrestling the same month.

On April 10 and 11, 2010, Kurihara took part in Shimmer Women Athletes' tapings of Volumes 29 to 32. On Volume 29 she defeated fellow joshi wrestler Tomoka Nakagawa, on Volume 30 Nikki Roxx and on Volume 31 Sara Del Rey, before losing to Daizee Haze via countout on Volume 32.

Kurihara returned to Mexico in late May/early June for her second tour. On May 29 at the Lucha Fan Fest in Circo Volador de Mexico City A☆YU☆MI won the Women X-LAW Extreme Championship, a title belt from Xtreme Latin American Wrestling. That same day Kurihara then returned to the Arena Mexico and Dragon Mania V for a tag match, where she and Marcela defeated Mima Shimoda and La Comandante. On May 30 A☆YU☆MI participated in an 8-Women tag match at the Arena Lopez Mateos for the Alianza Universal de Lucha Libre (AULL). Soon after rival joshi wrestler Tomoka Nakagawa traveled to Mexico to challenge A☆YU☆MI for her newly won title belt. After Nakagawa defeated her in a non-title match on June 3 for IWRG in Arena Naucalpan, A☆YU☆MI successfully defended the title belt against Nakagawa on June 5 at the Arena Lopez Mateos for the AULL promotion again.

On September 11 and 12, 2010, Kurihara returned to Shimmer Women Athletes to take part in the promotion's tapings of Volumes 33–36. On Volume 33 she defeated Daizee Haze in a rematch of Volume 32, on Volume 34 she unsuccessfully challenged Madison Eagles for the Shimmer Championship, on Volume 35 she defeated Cheerleader Melissa and finally on Volume 36 she, Ayako Hamada, Cheerleader Melissa and Serena Deeb defeated Daizee Haze, Tomoka Nakagawa, Madison Eagles and Sara Del Rey in an elimination tag team match. On December 31, 2010, Kurihara defeated Yoshiko Tamura in Tamura's retirement match to win the NWA Women's Pacific and NEO Single Championships. On October 1, 2011, Kurihara and Ayako Hamada defeated Daizee Haze and Tomoka Nakagawa to win the Shimmer Tag Team Championship. On November 8, Kurihara made her first appearance as A★YU★MI, a villainous version of her masked persona.

On November 26, 2011, Kurihara defeated Marcela in the main event of an Ayumi Kurihara Produce event to win Mexican promotion Consejo Mundial de Lucha Libre's World Women's Championship. After successful title defenses against Cherry and Hailey Hatred, Kurihara lost the title back to Marcela on March 9, 2012, in Mexico City. After seven successful title defenses, Kurihara and Ayako Hamada lost the Shimmer Tag Team Championship to Courtney Rush and Sara Del Rey on March 18 at the tapings of Volume 48. On July 16, Kurihara defeated Ryo Mizunami to win Pro Wrestling Wave's 2012 Catch the Wave tournament. On August 19, Kurihara teamed with her trainer Akino to defeat Aja Kong and Sonoko Kato for the Oz Academy Tag Team Championship.

On March 28, 2013, Kurihara announced that, due to the various injuries she had suffered during her career, she would be retiring from professional wrestling on August 4. On April 6, Kurihara returned to the United States for her final Shimmer Women Athletes appearance, losing to Mercedes Martinez at the Volume 53 internet pay-per-view. Kurihara's retirement event, titled "Thank You for Everything", took place on August 4 in Korakuen Hall and was produced by Zabun, the company behind Pro Wrestling Wave. Kurihara wrestled two matches during the event; first she defeated her trainee Mika Iida in the opening match and then teamed with Iida and Akino in a six-woman tag team main event, where they defeated Aja Kong, Gami and Tomoka Nakagawa, with Kurihara pinning Kong for the final win of her career.

== Professional wrestling style and persona ==
Kurihara often hits numerous dropkicks during her matches, including missile dropkicks off the top turnbuckle. She's not afraid to hit hard and take hard hits, prompting American wrestler Steve Corino, who worked for Pro Wrestling SUN and faced her in a mixed tag match, to call her "lil' Kawada girl."

== Personal life ==
Her parents' Tokyo yakiniku (焼肉) barbecue restaurant, the "Three Jewels" (三宝) was not only a place where wrestlers often ate, but is also a sponsor of pro wrestling events. Kurihara played basketball in high school in Tokyo, and after graduation, she went to work at her family's restaurant.

Kurihara is married to professional wrestler Yoshi-Hashi.

== Championships and accomplishments ==
- Consejo Mundial de Lucha Libre
  - CMLL World Women's Championship (1 time)
- Dramatic Dream Team
  - Ironman Heavymetalweight Championship (2 times)
- JDStar
  - League Princess Best Bout Award (2006) vs. Shuu Shibutani on May 4
- NEO Japan Ladies Pro-Wrestling
  - NEO Single Championship (1 time)
  - NEO Tag Team Championship (1 time) – with Yoshiko Tamura
  - NWA Women's Pacific Championship (1 time)
  - Best Bout of the Night (December 31, 2006) – vs. Shuu Shibutani
- Nikkan Sports
  - Joshi Puroresu Best Tag Team Award (2010) with Yoshiko Tamura
- Oz Academy
  - Oz Academy Tag Team Championship (1 time) – with Akino
  - Best Wizard Award (2 times)
    - Best Tag Team Match Award (2012) with Akino vs. Aja Kong and Sonoko Kato on August 19
    - MVP Award (2012)
- Pro Wrestling Wave
  - POK Championship (1 time)
  - Wave Tag Team Championship (1 time) – with Kana
  - Catch the Wave (2012)
  - Dual Shock Wave (2011) – with Kana
  - Catch the Wave Award (2 times)
    - Best Bout Award (2011) vs. Yumi Ohka on May 29
    - Best Bout Award (2012) vs. Syuri on June 24
- Shimmer Women Athletes
  - Shimmer Tag Team Championship (1 time) – with Ayako Hamada
- Xtreme Latin American Wrestling
  - X–LAW Women's Extreme Championship (1 time)
