= Natsuki Taiyo =

Japanese professional wrestler (born 1984)

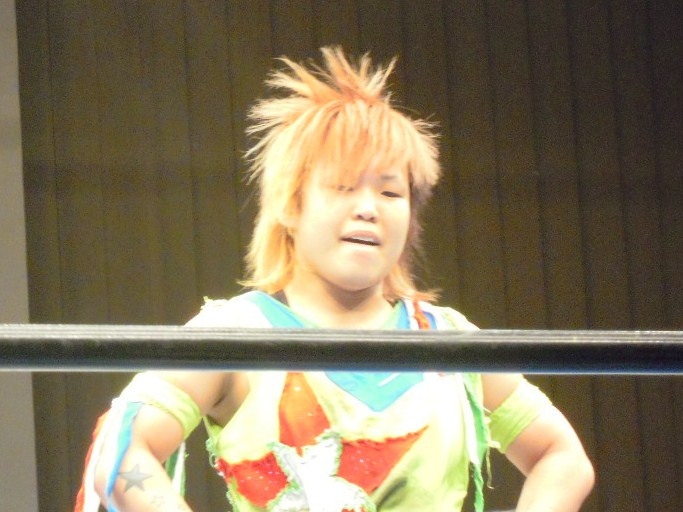
- Taiyo in May 2010

Personal information
- Born: Natsumi Mizushima; May 7, 1984 (age 42) Kawasaki, Kanagawa

Professional wrestling career
- Ring name(s): Crazy Sunshine; Natsuki; Natsuki☆Head; Natsuki☆Taiyo; Natsuki Taiyo; Natsumi Mizushima; Passion 2 Gou; Passion Nakki
- Billed height: 1.52 m (5 ft 0 in)
- Billed weight: 57 kg (126 lb)
- Trained by: Animal Hamaguchi
- Debut: January 3, 2004
- Retired: June 1, 2014

Natsumi Mizushima (水嶋 なつみ, Mizushima Natsumi; born May 7, 1984) is a Japanese retired professional wrestler, better known by the ring name Natsuki☆Taiyo (夏樹☆たいよう, Natsuki☆Taiyō). Making her debut for All Japan Women's Pro-Wrestling (AJW) in January 2004, Mizushima quickly affiliated herself with Nanae Takahashi, following her out of AJW in 2006 and to Pro Wrestling Sun and NEO Japan Ladies Pro Wrestling, with the two forming the Passion Red stable with Kana in the process. After the folding of NEO, Mizushima began working exclusively for the World Wonder Ring Stardom promotion, where she became a one-time holder of both the Artist of Stardom and Goddesses of Stardom Championships. She is also a former four-time holder of the High Speed Championship, which has been owned by both NEO and Stardom. Mizushima was recognized as one of the top high-flyers in joshi puroresu. She retired from in-ring competition in June 2014 and afterwards began working for the Seadlinnng promotion as a senior managing director and referee.

== Professional wrestling career ==
=== All Japan Women's Pro-Wrestling (2003–2004) ===
In 2003, Mizushima entered All Japan Women's Pro-Wrestling (AJW) dojo, where she was trained by Animal Hamaguchi in not only professional wrestling, but also mixed martial arts. On December 19, 2003, Mizushima made her MMA debut at an AJW event, losing to Mika "Hari Hari" Harigai at 2:10 in the first round, after being knocked out with knee strikes. She has not participated in any mixed martial arts fights since. Mizushima's professional wrestling debut took place on January 3, 2004, when she faced Hiromi Takahashi at an AJW event in Korakuen Hall, Tokyo. Mizushima would leave AJW, which was battling severe financial difficulties, later that year.

=== Gatokunyan and Pro Wrestling Sun (2005–2008) ===
In May 2005, Mizushima joined the Gatokunyan promotion, where she began performing under the ring name Natsuki☆Head. During late 2005 and early 2006, she also made several appearances for the new Ibuki promotion. On June 5, 2006, Natsuki☆Head won her first championship by defeating Hikari for Dramatic Dream Team's Ironman Heavymetalweight Championship, a title contested under the rules that a champion could be pinned or submitted anytime, anywhere, as long as there was a referee present. She held the title for nine days, before losing it to Mecha Mummy. On June 25, Natsuki regained the title from Masahiro Mekanashi during a battle royal, but would lose it to Mikami later during the same match.

On August 2, 2006, Nanae Takahashi announced that, with the backing of Pro Wrestling Zero1, she was forming a new promotion, named Pro Wrestling Sun, and named Natsuki☆Head as part of the promotion's roster. On September 24, Mizushima announced that she was changing her ring name to "Natsuki☆Taiyo". On December 31, Taiyo made her debut for NEO Japan Ladies Pro Wrestling, defeating Fuka for the Princess of Pro-Wrestling Championship, a title owned by the JDStar promotion. On February 21, 2007, Taiyo defeated Amazing Kong and Toshie Uematsu to win Pro Wrestling Sun's World-1 Women's Championship. She would hold the title for three months, before losing it to Kyoko Kimura on May 27. Shortly afterwards, Taiyo was stripped of the Princess of Pro-Wrestling Championship, after she had not defended the title for three months. While working in Pro Wrestling Sun, Taiyo formed a tag team with Nanae Takahashi, with whom she would also make semi-regular appearances for JWP Joshi Puroresu, with the two unsuccessfully challenging Kayoko Haruyama and Tsubasa Kuragaki for the JWP Tag Team Championship on December 9, 2007.

=== Passion Red (2008–2010) ===
In April 2008, Taiyo and Nanae Takahashi left Pro Wrestling Sun and formed the Passion Red stable with Kana on the Japanese independent circuit. The stable made appearances for several promotions, including Big Japan Pro Wrestling (BJW), Ice Ribbon, JWP, Oz Academy and NEO Japan Ladies Pro Wrestling, which effectively became its home promotion. Passion Red also promoted five independent events of its own. Passion Red made its debut for NEO on August 24, 2008, when Taiyo and Kana were defeated in a tag team match by Hiroyo Matsumoto and Kyoko Inoue. In their first six-woman tag team match on October 26, Taiyo, Kana and Takahashi defeated the trio of Etsuko Mita, Toshie Uematsu and Yoshiko Tamura. While feuding with the NEO originals led by Tamura, Passion Red also got involved with rival group Revolucion Amandla of Atsuko Emoto, Kyoko Kimura and Tomoka Nakagawa. On December 31 at Grand Final '08, Taiyo and Kana faced Ayumi Kurihara and Yoshiko Tamura in a match to determine the number one contenders to the NEO Tag Team Championship. At the end of the match, after a botched Taiyo-chan☆Bomb, Taiyo legitimately knocked Kurihara out with a kick to the face and then pinned her for the win with the Iguchi Bomb. The Passion Red duo received their shot at the NEO Tag Team Championship on February 21, 2009, but were defeated by the defending champions, Atsuko Emoto and Kyoko Kimura. On April 19, Passion Red and Revolucion Amandla wrestled to a 30-minute time limit draw in a six-woman tag team match.

On May 5, Taiyo defeated Ray to become the first NEO High Speed Champion. The chemistry between Taiyo and Ray led to the two forming a tag team for July's Mid Summer Tag Tournament VIII. Though the team was eliminated from the tournament in the first round by Emi Sakura and Nanae Takahashi, the partnership eventually led to Ray joining Passion Red under the ring name Passion Ray. During 2009, Passion Red was also joined by Kazumi Shimouna and Yumiko Hotta. On July 25, Taiyo made her first High Speed Championship defense, defeating Io Shirai, and followed that up by successfully defending the title against Fuka on August 29. On September 20, Taiyo lost the NEO High Speed Championship to Kaori Yoneyama in her third defense. On November 22, Taiyo and Passion Ray received a shot at their fellow Passion Red members' Kana's and Nanae Takahashi's NEO Tag Team Championship, but were unable to become the new champions. On December 31, Taiyo faced male wrestler Kenny Omega in a losing effort. On February 14, 2010, Taiyo regained the NEO High Speed Championship from Yoneyama at a JWP event. On March 19, she successfully defended the title against Tomoka Nakagawa at Passion Red's fourth independent event. On May 3, she defended the title against Tsukasa Fujimoto at an Ice Ribbon event. On June 5, Taiyo made her final appearance for NEO, which would fold at the end of the year. On November 27, Taiyo lost the NEO High Speed Championship to Leon at Passion Red's fifth independent event.

=== World Wonder Ring Stardom (2010–2014) ===
On September 7, 2010, at a press conference, where Nanae Takahashi unveiled her new World Wonder Ring Stardom promotion, Taiyo was announced as part of the promotion's roster. The promotion's debut event on January 23, 2011, saw Taiyo team up with Yuzuki Aikawa in the opening tag team match, where they were defeated by the team of Iris and Nanae Takahashi. Later that same event, Taiyo worked under a mask and the ring name Passion Nakki, facing nine-year-old Haruka in a three-minute exhibition match. The following month, Taiyo formed the tag team Kawasaki Katsushika Saikyou Densetsu with the recently debuted Yoshiko, the two defeating Iris and Yoko Bito in their first match together. Taiyo's and Yoshiko's win streak was ended on May 29, when they were defeated by Nanae Takahashi and Yoko Bito. Also in May, freelancer Yuu Yamagata aligned herself with Taiyo and Yoshiko, forming the stable Trouble Maker 2. On July 24, Taiyo defeated JWP representative Leon to regain the former NEO High Speed Championship, which was then, as a result, adopted by Stardom as one of its championships. On October 10, Taiyo and Yoshiko entered the Goddesses of Stardom Tag League. On October 27, Taiyo represented Stardom in Sendai Girls' Pro Wrestling's Joshi Puroresu Dantai Taikou Flash tournament, a single-elimination tournament, where different joshi promotions battled each other. In their first round match, Team Stardom (Taiyo, Mayu Iwatani, Saki Kashima, Yoko Bito and Yoshiko) defeated Team Reina (Aki Kanbayashi, Aoi Ishibashi, La Comandante, Yumiko Hotta and Zeuxis). The semifinals of the tournament were contested in six-woman tag team format and saw Team Stardom (Taiyo, Bito and Nanae Takahashi) defeat Team Diana (Kaoru Ito, Kyoko Inoue and Sareee). However, in the finals, the Stardom duo of Takahashi and Yoshiko were defeated by Team Sendai's Kagetsu and Meiko Satomura. On November 12, Taiyo unsuccessfully challenged Nanae Takahashi for the World of Stardom Championship. When the Goddesses of Stardom Tag League concluded on November 27, Taiyo and Yoshiko finished with two wins and one loss, making it to the finals of the tournament, where they were defeated by Yuzuki Aikawa and Yoko Bito, whom they had defeated earlier in the tournament.

In February 2012, the recently debuted Act Yasukawa joined Taiyo and Yoshiko as the third member of Trouble Maker 2, effectively replacing Yuu Yamagata, whose Stardom appearances became more irregular. On March 20, 2012, Taiyo and Yoshiko received another shot at the Goddesses of Stardom Championship, but were again defeated by Aikawa and Bito. Five days later, Taiyo made her first successful defense of the High Speed Championship, defeating Io Shirai. On May 3, Kyoko Kimura turned on Miho Wakizawa and joined Taiyo, Yoshiko and Yasukawa as the fourth member of their newly renamed stable, Kawasaki Katsushika Saikyou Densetsu Plus One, often shortened to Kawakatsu-gun. On June 10, Saki Kashima turned on Yuzuki Aikawa's Zenryoku Joshi stable and became the fifth member of Kawakatsu-gun. On June 24, Taiyo led Kashima, Yasukawa and Yoshiko to a win over Kairi Hojo, Yoko Bito, Yuhi and Yuzuki Aikawa of Zenryoku Joshi in an eight-woman battle of the stables. However, the following month Kawakatsu-gun broke up into two camps, when Yoshiko sided with Kyoko Kimura in her disagreement with Taiyo. On July 22, Taiyo and Act Yasukawa were defeated in a tag team match by Kimura and Yoshiko, with Kimura pinning Taiyo for the win. On August 5, Taiyo defeated Kimura in a grudge match to retain her spot as the leader of Kawakatsu-gun, which led to Kimura quitting the stable. From August 19 to September 30, Taiyo took part in the 5★Star GP2012 round-robin tournament, where she opened up with wins over Kairi Hojo and Miho Wakizawa, before losing to Kyoko Kimura on September 2. Taiyo then wrestled Saki Kashima to a draw and finished her tournament with a win over Dark Angel, which took her to the top of her block. However, later in the day, Kyoko Kimura defeated Kawakatsu-gun member Saki Kashima to overtake Taiyo in the standings, eliminating her from the finals of the tournament. On October 21, Taiyo made her second successful defense of the High Speed Championship against stablemate Saki Kashima. On October 27, Taiyo and Yoshiko entered the 2012 Goddesses of Stardom Tag League, suffering an upset loss against the team of Io Shirai and Mayu Iwatani in their opening round-robin match. They, however, bounced back with wins over Eri Susa and Nozomi, and Yuhi and Yuzuki Aikawa to win their block. On November 25, Taiyo and Yoshiko defeated Kairi Hojo and Natsumi Showzuki to win the 2012 Goddesses of Stardom Tag League and the vacant Goddesses of Stardom Championship. Taiyo and Yoshiko made their first successful title defense on December 24 against Zenryoku Joshi representatives Hiroyo Matsumoto and Yuhi. On December 31, Taiyo and Nanae Takahashi reformed Passion Red for a special appearance at Ice Ribbon's RibbonMania 2012 event, where they defeated Muscle Venus (Hikaru Shida and Tsukasa Fujimoto) in a tag team match.

On January 14, 2013, Taiyo and Kawakatsu-gun stablemates Act Yasukawa and Saki Kashima first defeated Nanae Gundan (Miho Wakizawa, Tsukasa Fujimoto and Yui Yokoo) in the first round and then Team Shimmer (Kellie Skater, Portia Perez and Tomoka Nakagawa) in the finals to become the inaugural Artist of Stardom Champions, making Taiyo a triple champion in the promotion. Six days later, Taiyo and Yoshiko defeated Thunder Rock (Io Shirai and Mayu Iwatani) to make their second successful defense of the Goddesses of Stardom Championship. This was followed by their third successful defense against Nanamiho (Miho Wakizawa and Nanae Takahashi) on February 10. On March 3, Taiyo made her third successful defense of the High Speed Championship, when she wrestled freelancer Kaori Yoneyama to a thirty-minute time limit draw. On March 17, Taiyo and Yoshiko lost the Goddesses of Stardom Championship to Kimura Monster-gun representatives Hailey Hatred and Kyoko Kimura in their fourth title defense. On April 29 at Ryōgoku Cinderella, Taiyo made her fourth successful defense of the High Speed Championship against Yuhi. On May 9, Kawasaki Katsushika Saikyou Densetsu was stripped of the Artist of Stardom Championship, after both Kashima and Yasukawa had been sidelined with injuries. On June 2, Taiyo lost the High Speed Championship to Kaori Yoneyama in her fifth defense, ending her third reign at 679 days. On July 15, Taiyo and Yoshiko attempted to regain the vacant Goddesses of Stardom Championship in a one-night tournament. After defeating Thunder Rock, the two made it to the finals of the tournament, where they were defeated by Nanamiho. On August 17, Taiyo also attempted to regain the Artist of Stardom Championship with stablemates Act Yasukawa and Yoshiko, but the three were defeated by the defending champions, Kairi Hojo, Kaori Yoneyama and Yuhi. At the conclusion of the event, Yasukawa turned on Taiyo and Yoshiko and jumped to Kimura Monster-gun. From August 25 to September 23, Taiyo took part in 5★Star GP2013, where she finished with a record of two wins, one draw and two losses, with a loss against Nanae Takahashi on the final day costing her a spot in the finals. In November, Taiyo and Yoshiko became the only team to have taken part in all three Goddesses of Stardom Tag tournaments. The two made it to the semifinals of the tournament, before losing to Kimura Monster-gun representatives Alpha Female and The Female Predator "Amazon".

On December 29, Taiyo won the High Speed Championship for the fourth time, regaining the title from Yoneyama. Following the main event of the evening, Taiyo challenged World of Stardom Champion Io Shirai. On January 12, 2014, Taiyo celebrated her tenth anniversary in professional wrestling by reuniting with Nanae Takahashi in a tag team main event, where they defeated Mayu Iwatani and Yoshiko. On January 26 at Stardom's third anniversary event, Taiyo unsuccessfully challenged Shirai for the World of Stardom Championship. Following the match, Taiyo announced she would be retiring from professional wrestling on June 1. On February 2, Taiyo defeated Kaori Yoneyama in a rematch to make her first successful defense of the High Speed Championship. On March 16, Taiyo was defeated by Yoshiko in the final match between the longtime tag team partners. Taiyo continued making successful defenses of the High Speed Championship, defeating Mayu Iwatani on April 6 and Kaori Yoneyama in a two out of three falls match on April 29. Later in the event, Taiyo offered to make her final defense of the title against World of Stardom Champion Io Shirai, noting that she had also made her first ever defense of the title against her in July 2009. On May 3, Taiyo and Yoshiko teamed up for what was billed as Kawasaki Katsushika Saikyou Densetsu's final match together, where they defeated Shirai and Nanae Takahashi. Three days later, Taiyo lost the High Speed Championship to Shirai. After announcing her retirement, Taiyo began making farewell appearances for several other promotions, including Gatoh Move Pro Wrestling, Ice Ribbon, JWP Joshi Puroresu, and Sendai Girls' Pro Wrestling, while also working independent events produced by Chigusa Nagayo and Ray. On May 24, Passion Red reunited for their sixth self-produced event, during which Taiyo wrestled three times, including in an exhibition tag team match with her idol Momoe Nakanishi, who had retired in 2005, and in a tag team main event, where she and Nanae Takahashi defeated Command Bolshoi and Meiko Satomura. On June 1, Taiyo was defeated by Nanae Takahashi in her retirement match.

=== Seadlinnng (2015–present) ===
Following Nanae Takahashi's departure from Stardom, she held a press conference on June 12, 2015, to announce "Seadlinnng", a new professional wrestling production company with Mizushima serving as its senior managing director. Mizushima, billed as "Natsuki Taiyo" (without the star in her ring name), also began working for Seadlinnng as a referee, making her debut in the role at the promotion's first event on August 26.

== Other media ==
In 2011, Mizushima had a minor acting role in the Welcome to the El-Palacio television drama, where she appeared alongside fellow Stardom wrestlers Nanae Takahashi, Yoshiko and Yuzuki Aikawa.

== Championships and accomplishments ==
- Dramatic Dream Team
  - Ironman Heavymetalweight Championship (2 times)
- JDStar
  - Princess of Pro-Wrestling Championship (1 time)
- JWP Joshi Puroresu
  - Discover New Heroine Tag Tournament Best Match Award (2007) with Nanae Takahashi vs. Arisa Nakajima and Azumi Hyuga on April 15
  - JWP Year End-Award (1 time)
    - Best Bout Award (2007) with Nanae Takahashi vs. Kayoko Haruyama and Tsubasa Kuragaki on December 9
- NEO Japan Ladies Pro-Wrestling
  - NEO High Speed Championship (2 times)
  - Junior All Star MVP Award (2006)
- Pro Wrestling Sun
  - World-1 Women's Championship (1 time)
- World Wonder Ring Stardom
  - Artist of Stardom Championship (1 time, inaugural) – with Act Yasukawa and Saki Kashima
  - Goddesses of Stardom Championship (1 time) – with Yoshiko
  - High Speed Championship (2 times)
  - Artist of Stardom Championship Tournament (2013)
  - Goddesses of Stardom Tag League (2012) – with Yoshiko
  - 5★Star GP Award (2 times)
    - 5★Star GP Best Bout Award (2013) vs. Nanae Takahashi on September 23
    - 5★Star GP Technique Award (2012)
  - Stardom Year-End Award (3 times)
    - Best Bout Award (2011) vs. Nanae Takahashi on November 12
    - Best Tag Team Award (2012) with Yoshiko
    - Best Technique Award (2013)

== Mixed martial arts record ==
Professional record breakdown
1 match	0 wins	1 loss
By knockout	0	1

Res.	Record	Opponent	Method	Event	Date	Round	Time	Location	Notes
Loss	0-1	Mika Harigai	KO (Knees)	AJW Tag League: The Best	December 19, 2003	1	2:10	Tokyo, Japan	
