= Misae Genki =

Japanese professional wrestler

Personal information
- Born: February 14, 1973 (age 53) Iruma, Japan

Professional wrestling career
- Ring name(s): Giant Bolshoi; G. Warrior; Misae-chan; Misae Genki; Misae Moe Moe; Misae Watanabe
- Billed height: 173 cm (5 ft 8 in)
- Billed weight: 83 kg (183 lb)
- Debut: 1994
- Retired: 2008

Misae Watanabe (渡辺みさえ, Watanabe Misae) better known by her ring name Misae Genki is a Japanese retired professional wrestler best known for her tenure with the Japanese promotions NEO Japan Ladies Pro-Wrestling, All Japan Women's Pro-Wrestling and JWP Joshi Puroresu.

== Professional wrestling career ==
=== Independent circuit (1996–2008) ===
Watanabe is known for competing in various promotions from the Japanese independent scene. She competed in two of the earliest events promoted by Ice Ribbon, both held on September 9, 2006, respective the Ice Ribbon The Fifth Ice Ribbon Part 2 and 3, where she first teamed up with Cherry to defeat Aoi Kizuki and Kaori Yoneyama, and secondly with Ayako Sato to defeat Kizuki and Ray. At Oz Academy Wizard on April 1, 2007, she teamed up with Yuki Miyazaki in a losing effort against Chikayo Nagashima and Dynamite Kansai. She also took part in independent events such as Jaguar Yokota's 30th Anniversary Convention from March 11, 2007, where she competed in a 32-person battle royal won by Devil Masami and also involving popular wrestlers from the 1980s and 1990s like Akino, Carlos Amano, Gami, Mayumi Ozaki, Sachie Abe, Toshie Uematsu, Yumiko Hotta and many others.

=== JWP Joshi Puroresu (1998–2008) ===
Watanabe also competed in JWP. Her most notable works mainly focused on title matches, such as the one from JWP Climax 2008 on December 28, where she teamed up with Keiko Aono to unsuccessfully challenge Ran Yu-Yu and Toshie Uematsu for both the JWP Tag Team Championship and the Daily Sports Women's Tag Team Championship.

=== All Japan Women's Pro-Wrestling (1994–2005) ===
Watanabe made her professional wrestling debut in All Japan Women's Pro-Wrestling at AJW Japan Grand Prix '94 on August 28, 1994, where she teamed up with Kumiko Maekawa and faced Rie Tamada and Yoko Takahashi.

During her eleven-year tenure with the promotion, Watanabe competed in various of the promotion's signarute events. As for the Tag League the Best, she made her first appearance at the 2001 edition where she teamed up with Kumiko Maekawa and scored a total of five points after going against the teams of Manami Toyota and Yumiko Hotta, Kaoru Ito and Momoe Nakanishi, Las Cachorras Orientales (Etsuko Mita and Mima Shimoda), Kiss no Sekai (Kayo Noumi and Miho Wakizawa) and Nanae Takahashi and Tomoko Watanabe. At the 2002 edition she teamed up with Maekawa again, scoring a total of seven points after competing against Kiss no Sekai (Kayo Noumi and Momoe Nakanishi), Takako Inoue and Tomoko Watanabe, Las Cachorras Orientales (Etsuko Mita and Mima Shimoda), Fang Suzuki and Nanae Takahashi, Mariko Yoshida and Yumiko Hotta, Megumi Yabushita and Sumie Sakai, and Mika Nishio and Miyuki Fujii.

Another event in which she took part was the Japan Grand Prix, the promotion's greatest yearly tournament, in which she made her first appearance at the 1997 edition where she scored a total of five known points against Kaoru Ito, Manami Toyota, Kumiko Maekawa, Etsuko Mita, Mima Shimoda, Tomoko Watanabe, Rie Tamada, Saya Endo, Tanny Mouse, Yoshiko Tamura and Mariko Yoshida. Her last appearance took place at the 2004 edition where she defeated Nanae Takahashi in the first rounds but fell short to Hikaru in the second ones.

== Championships and accomplishments ==
- Big Japan Pro Wrestling
  - BJW Women's Championship (1 time, inaugural)
- DDT Pro-Wrestling
  - Ironman Heavymetalweight Championship (5 times)
- JWP Joshi Puroresu
  - JWP Tag Team Championship (1 time) – with Ran Yu-Yu
- NEO Japan Ladies Pro-Wrestling
  - NWA Women's Pacific/NEO Single Championship (3 times)
  - NEO Tag Team Championship (2 times) – with Haruka Matsuo (1) and Yoshiko Tamura (1)
  - AWF World Women's Championship (1 time)
  - NEO Japan Cup (2001, 2002, 2005)
  - NEO Hall Of Fame (2010)
