= Yoshiko Tamura =

Japanese wrestler

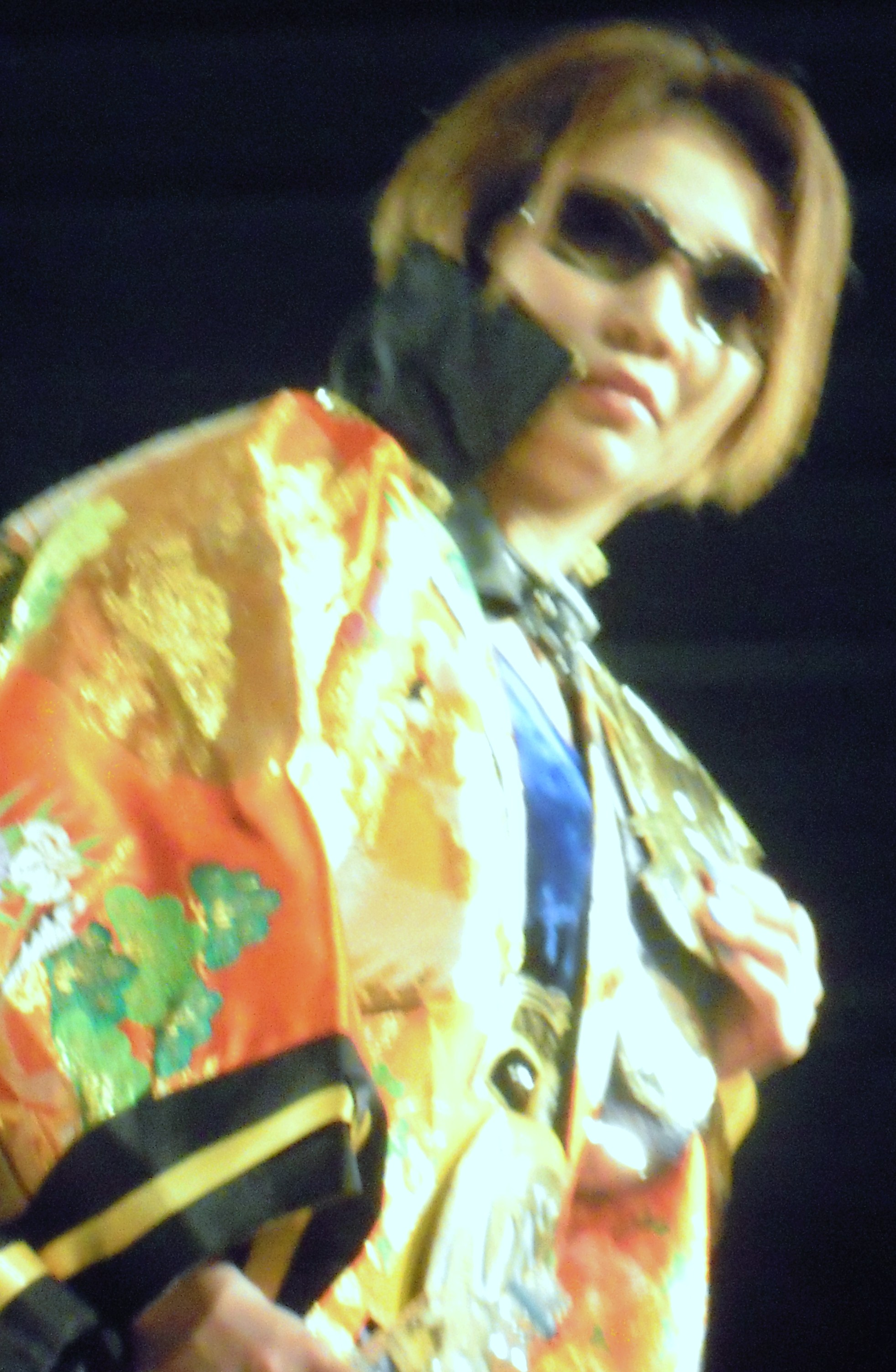
- Tamura in March 2010

Personal information
- Born: Yoshiko Tamura; February 6, 1976 (age 50) Edogawa, Tokyo

Professional wrestling career
- Ring name(s): Etsuko Tamura; Yoshiko Tamura
- Billed height: 1.65 m (5 ft 5 in)
- Billed weight: 70 kg (154 lb)
- Trained by: Jaguar Yokota
- Debut: September 15, 1994
- Retired: December 31, 2010

Yoshiko Tamura (田村 欣子, Tamura Yoshiko; born February 6, 1976) is a Japanese retired professional wrestler. Tamura was trained by the All Japan Women's Pro-Wrestling (AJW) promotion, made her debut in September 1994 and worked for the promotion for three years, winning the AJW Junior Championship, before taking part in a mass exodus led by Kyoko Inoue and following her to the newly founded NEO Japan Ladies Pro-Wrestling promotion. Recognized as the "Ace" of NEO, Tamura performed with the promotion from its first event to the last, in the process becoming its most accomplished wrestler, winning the NEO Single and NWA Women's Pacific Championships a record seven times and the NEO Tag Team Championship three times. All in all, Tamura held the NEO Single and NWA Women's Pacific Championships for 2,074 days and successfully defended them 38 times. After being inducted into the NEO Hall of Fame, Tamura ended her sixteen-year career on December 31, 2010, retiring at the end of NEO's final event.

== Professional wrestling career ==
=== All Japan Women's Pro Wrestling (1994–1997) ===
Tamura was trained at the All Japan Women's Pro Wrestling (AJW) dojo and made her debut on September 15, 1994, in a match against Kaoru Kanayama. Tamura won her first championship on June 27, 1995, defeating Misae Watanabe for the vacant AJW Junior Championship. After a fourteen-month reign, Tamura lost the title to Tomoko Miyaguchi on September 1, 1996. The following year, Tamura, along with several key wrestlers in AJW, took part in a mass exodus led by Kyoko Inoue, and left the promotion, which was struggling with financial difficulties.

=== Independent circuit (1997–1999) ===
After parting ways with AJW, Tamura affiliated herself with Kyoko Inoue, who had purchased a dojo and was planning to start her own promotion. However, the promotion, NEO Japan Ladies Pro Wrestling, would not start running regular shows until over two years later. Meanwhile, Tamura made appearances for several independent promotions, including Frontier Martial-Arts Wrestling (FMW), Hyper Visual Fighting Arsion and Oz Academy. On July 19, 1997, Tamura made a guest appearance for Gaea Japan, defeating Toshie Uematsu for the WCW Women's Cruiserweight Championship, a title also recognized by American promotion World Championship Wrestling (WCW). Tamura would hold the title for two months, before losing it to Sugar Sato on September 20, in her second Gaea Japan appearance.

=== NEO Japan Ladies Pro Wrestling (2000–2010) ===
In 2000, NEO Japan Ladies Pro-Wrestling began running shows regularly, starting with an event on May 31, where Tamura and Azumi Hyuga wrestled Misae Genki and Ran Yu-Yu to a thirty-minute time limit draw in the main event. In NEO, Tamura reinvented herself as "Tamura-sama", adopting the character of an arrogant villain. On August 24, Tamura represented NEO at a National Wrestling Alliance (NWA) event in Wildwood, New Jersey, United States, where she defeated Nicole Bass to become the inaugural NWA Women's Pacific Champion. The title was from the start unified with the NEO Single Championship and, although both championships were represented by their own belts, they remained together for their entire history. Tamura made her first title defense back in Japan on September 22, defeating Takako Inoue. Before the end of NEO's first year, Tamura also defended the titles against Misae Genki on October 13 and Kyoko Inoue on November 21. On February 11, 2001, Tamura lost the titles to Mima Shimoda in her fourth defense, ending her reign at 171 days. The following May, Tamura made it to the finals of the NEO Japan Cup, before losing to Misae Genki. On December 7, Tamura regained the NEO Single and NWA Women's Pacific Championships by defeating champion Lioness Asuka, Kyoko Inoue, Mima Shimoda, Misae Genki and Ran Yu-Yu in a six-way elimination match. After successful defenses against Misae Genki, Yuki Miyazaki and Kyoko Inoue, Tamura lost the titles to Etsuko Mita on April 13, 2002. However, the following month, Tamura defeated Mima Shimoda to win the 2002 NEO Japan Cup, which earned her another title shot on June 8, where Tamura defeated Mita to win the NEO Single and NWA Women's Pacific Championships for the third time. Tamura's third reign ended on October 14, 2002, when the HJPG (Horipro Joshi Puroresu Group) stable stole her belt, which was then declared vacant and put up for grabs in a tournament. On November 10, Tamura defeated Kyoko Inoue and Mima Shimoda in a three-way elimination tournament final match to win the vacant titles for the fourth time. On February 2, 2003, Tamura lost the titles to Inoue in her first defense, a Two Out of Three Falls match. Just three months later on May 5, Tamura defeated Azumi Hyuga to win the NEO Single and NWA Women's Pacific Championships for already the fifth time. In September, Tamura attempted to become a double champion, when she teamed with Ofune in the Itabashi Tag Team Championship tournament. Tamura and Ofune made it all the way to the finals of the tournament, before losing to the NEO Machineguns (Tanny Mouse and Yuki Miyazaki). Tamura's fifth NEO Single and NWA Women's Pacific Championship reign of 314 days ended on March 12, 2004, when she was defeated by Momoe Nakanishi.

On August 14, Tamura took part in a unique match, when she faced 31 other wrestlers in a gauntlet match. On September 20, Tamura defeated The Bloody to win Trans World Federation's (TWF) World Women's Championship, a title owned by the JDStar promotion. On December 19, she put the title on the line a title vs. title match against the NEO Single and NWA Women's Pacific Champion Misae Genki; the match ended in a one-hour time limit draw, meaning that both champions retained their titles. The rivalry between Tamura and Genki continued a year later on December 11, 2005, when Tamura defeated Genki to win the NEO Single and NWA Women's Pacific Championships for the sixth time. Tamura would hold the titles for all of 2006, successfully defending it against Mima Shimoda, Ran Yu-Yu, Toshie Uematsu, Kyoko Inoue, Hikaru, Kayoko Haruyama, Chikayo Nagashima, Kyoko Kimura, Mariko Yoshida and Azumi Hyuga. On June 24, 2006, Tamura returned to the United States to compete in ChickFight V in San Francisco, California. After being eliminated from the tournament in the semifinals by Cheerleader Melissa, Tamura went on to successfully defend the NEO Single and NWA Women's Pacific Championships against MsChif. On August 19, Tamura and Haruka Matsuo defeated the Oz Academy team of Carlos Amano and Chikayo Nagashima to win the Mid Summer Tag Tournament VI. The following day, Tamura participated in Wrestle Expo 2006 in Odaiba, where she took part in the World Women's Wrestling Classics (WWWC) Tournament, defeating MsChif in the finals to not only win the tournament, but to also retain the NEO Single and NWA Women's Pacific Championships. Tamura's domination continued well into 2007, with successful NEO Single and NWA Women's Pacific Championship defenses against Ayako Hamada, Emi Sakura and Vanessa the Mountain. On July 16, Tamura and Emi Sakura defeated Haruka Matsuo and Misae Genki to win the NEO Tag Team Championship, making Tamura a double champion. However, Tamura's and Sakura's reign would end just thirteen days later, when they were defeated by Ayako Hamada and Kaoru Ito. Finally, on September 17, 2007, Tamura lost the NEO Single and NWA Women's Pacific Championships to former tag team partner Haruka Matsuo. Tamura's reign of 645 days and fifteen successful title defenses are both unparalleled records in NEO's history.

Before the end of 2007, Tamura would once again wear gold in NEO, when she regained the NEO Tag Team Championship from Hamada and Ito on November 4, this time teaming with old rival Misae Genki. They would lose the title to the NEO Machineguns on March 2, 2008. Afterwards, Tamura began feuding with the Revolucion Amandla stable of Atsuko Emoto, Kyoko Kimura and Tomoka Nakagawa, often teaming with the likes of Aya Yuki, Etsuko Mita and Misae Genki. During late 2008, the feud turned into a three-way battle, when Passion Red (Nanae Takahashi, Kana and Natsuki☆Taiyo) entered NEO. In February 2009, Tamura found a new tag team partner in Ayumi Kurihara. The team, dubbed "The Soul to One", would receive their first shot at the NEO Tag Team Championship on March 8, but was defeated by the defending champions, Revolucion Amandla's Atsuko Emoto and Kyoko Kimura. On May 5, Tamura won the NEO Single and NWA Women's Pacific Championships for the seventh time by defeating former tag team partner Emi Sakura with a new finishing maneuver, Mount Cook. Approaching July's Mid Summer Tag Tournament VIII, Kurihara turned her back on the new NEO Single and NWA Women's Pacific Champion by accepting former rival Kana's request to become her tag team partner for the tournament. This was followed by Emi Sakura and Aya Yuki also declining an offer to team with Tamura, instead choosing other partners. Finally, Fuka accepted Tamura's offer to become her partner for the tournament. During the tournament Tamura gained a measure of revenge on both Yuki and Kurihara, when she and Fuka first eliminated the team of Yuki and Minori Makiba in the first round and then Kurihara and Kana in the semifinals. However, in the finals of the tournament, Tamura and Fuka were defeated by Emi Sakura and Nanae Takahashi. This led to a NEO Single and NWA Women's Pacific Championship match on September 20, where Tamura successfully defended the titles against Takahashi. On December 31, the reunited Tamura and Ayumi Kurihara defeated Nanae Takahashi and Kana of Passion Red for the NEO Tag Team Championship. They would make their first title defense on February 14, 2010, defeating Revolucion Amandla representatives Kyoko Kimura and Tomoka Nakagawa.

On May 5, 2010, following the departure of Kyoko Inoue, NEO Japan Ladies Pro Wrestling, which was celebrating its tenth anniversary, announced that it would cease its operations after the year-end show on December 31. The announcement was followed by Tamura, Tanny Mouse and Yuki Miyazaki, dubbed the NEO3, all announcing that the event would also feature their final professional wrestling matches. After successful Tag Team Championship defenses against the teams of Seven Star Sisters (Hiroyo Matsumoto and Misaki Ohata), the Shirai Sisters (Io and Mio), Triple Tails (Io Shirai and Kana), and the NEO Machineguns, Tamura successfully defended the NEO Single and NWA Women's Pacific Championships against Kurihara on October 11. On November 6, Tamura successfully defended the NEO Single and NWA Women's Pacific Championships against longtime rival Kyoko Kimura in a Street Fighting Spirit Death Match. On November 13, Tamura and Kurihara lost the NEO Tag Team Championship to Aya Yuki and Ryo Mizunami. During the next month, Tamura went on a retirement tour across the Japanese independent circuit, which saw her successfully defend the NEO Single and NWA Women's Pacific Championships against Yumi Ohka in Pro Wrestling Wave, Kaori Yoneyama in JWP Joshi Puroresu, and Hikaru Shida in Ice Ribbon. Tamura also successfully defended the titles in NEO against Emi Sakura and Aya Yuki to ensure that she would head to her final night in professional wrestling as the champion. Prior to the event, Tamura was inducted into the NEO Hall of Fame. On December 31, Tamura lost the NEO Single and NWA Women's Pacific Championships to Ayumi Kurihara in her singles retirement match, ending her final reign at 605 days and twelve successful defenses. Later that same night, Tamura, Tanny Mouse and Yuki Miyazaki, the NEO veterans, wrestled NEO rookies Aya Yuki, Mika Iida and Nagisa Nozaki to a ten-minute time limit draw in the final match in not only the careers of Tamura, Mouse and Miyazaki, but also in the history of NEO Japan Ladies Pro Wrestling.

== Other media ==
Tamura made her acting debut in the 2009 film Three Count, where she played the role of a professional wrestling trainer, working alongside Emi Sakura, Kyoko Inoue and Hikaru Shida.

== Personal life ==
On January 1, 2011, Tamura received a diploma in aromatherapy, after passing Japan Aromacoordinator Association's authorization test. She has her own aromatherapy clinic, named Aroma Optimal Corner, in Edogawa, Tokyo.

== Championships and accomplishments ==
- All Japan Women's Pro-Wrestling
  - AJW Junior Championship (1 time)
  - 1994 Rookie of the Year Decision Tournament
- American Wrestling Federation
  - AWF World Women's Championship (1 time)
- Gaea Japan
  - WCW Women's Cruiserweight Championship (1 time)
- JDStar
  - TWF World Women's Championship (2 times)
- JWP Joshi Puroresu
  - JWP Year-End Award (2 times)
    - Best Bout Award (2006) vs. Azumi Hyuga on December 24
    - Best Bout Award (2010) vs. Kaori Yoneyama on December 23
- NEO Japan Ladies Pro-Wrestling
  - NEO Single Championship (7 times)
  - NEO Tag Team Championship (3 times) – with Emi Sakura (1), Misae Genki (1), and Ayumi Kurihara (1)
  - Emperor Cup (2002)
  - Itabashi Final Special (2010)
  - Mid Summer Tag Tournament VI (2006) – with Haruka Matsuo
  - NEO Japan Cup (2002)
  - NEO Hall of Fame (Class of 2010)
- Nikkan Sports
  - Joshi Puroresu Best Bout Award (2009) vs. Emi Sakura on May 9
  - Joshi Puroresu Best Tag Team Award (2010) with Ayumi Kurihara
- Wrestle Expo 2006
  - World Women's Wrestling Classics Tournament (2006)
