= Yuki Miyazaki =

Japanese professional wrestler

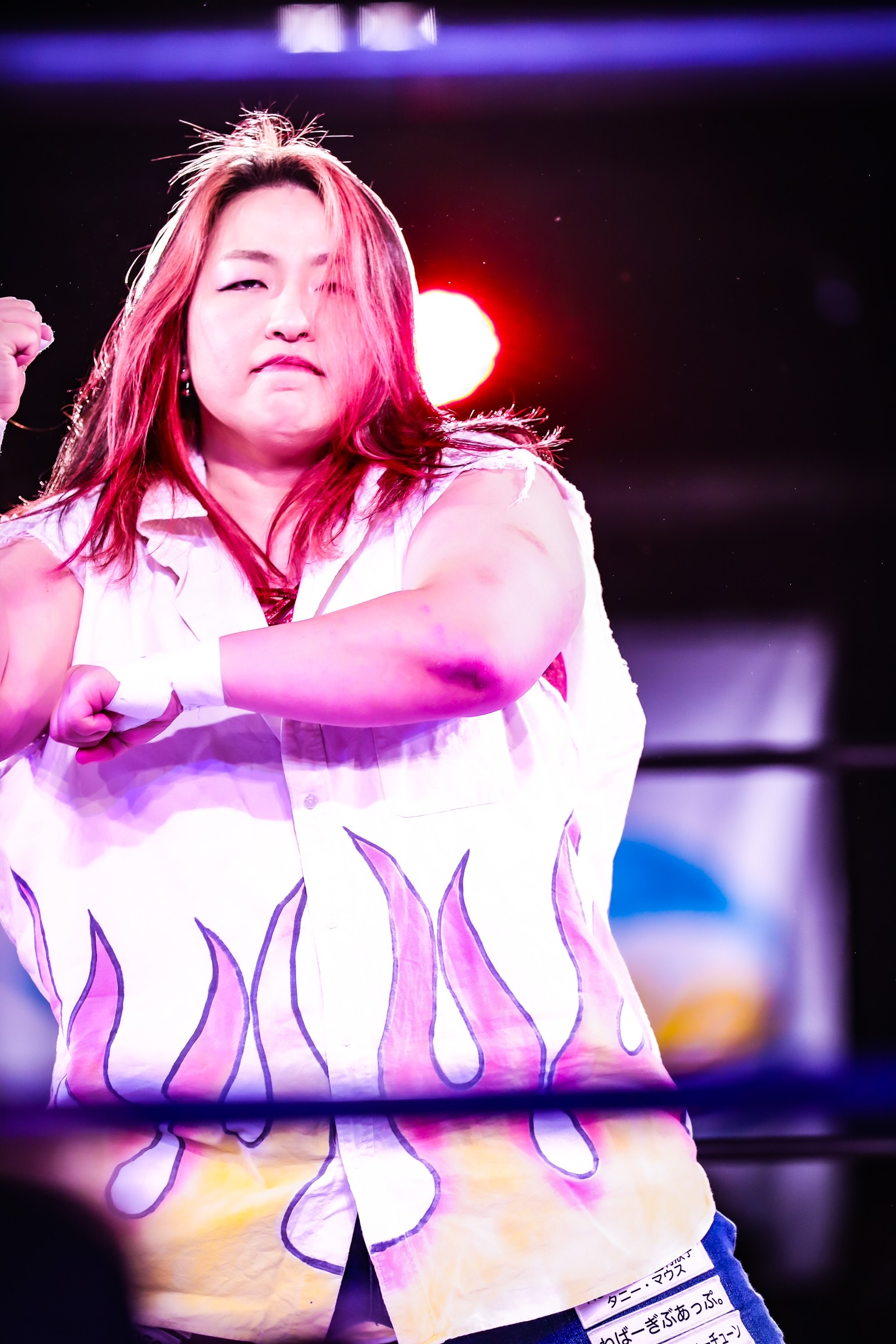
- Miyazaki in April 2023

Personal information
- Born: February 2, 1979 (age 47) Anjō, Japan

Professional wrestling career
- Ring name(s): Etsuko Miyazaki; Pesadija Rocca; Policewoman; Yuki Miyazaki
- Billed height: 1.60 m (5 ft 3 in)
- Billed weight: 85 kg (187 lb)
- Trained by: Jaguar Yokota; Plum Mariko
- Debut: 1995
- Retired: January 1, 2026

Yuki Miyazaki (宮崎有妃, Miyazaki Yuki) is a Japanese retired professional wrestler best known for her tenures with the Japanese professional wrestling promotions Pro Wrestling Wave, NEO Japan Ladies Pro-Wrestling (NEO) and JWP Joshi Puroresu (JWP) and All Japan Women's Pro-Wrestling.

== Professional wrestling career ==
=== Japanese independent circuit (1995–2026) ===
Miyazaki made her professional wrestling debut on January 8, 1995, at a house show promoted by Japanese Women Pro-Wrestling Project, where she fought Tomoko Kuzumi in a time-limit draw. She participated in a 50-women gauntlet match at OZ Academy/Manami Toyota Produce Manami Toyota 30th Anniversary, Manami Toyota's retirement show produced by Oz Academy on November 3, 2017, where she was the 12th woman to get pinned. She participated at Dynamite Kansai's retirement show too, at OZ Academy/Dynamite Kansai Produce Farewell Dynamite Kansai from December 11, 2016, where she teamed up with Kaori Yoneyama and Aoi Kizuki to defeat Bachiko, Reika and Command Bolshoi in a six-woman tag team match. She is known for her tenure with Seadlinnng, promotion for which she wrestled at events such as Seadlinnng Fortissimo from May 24, 2017, where she teamed up with Nanae Takahashi in a losing effort to Aja Kong and Mika Akino. Miyazaki participated in the AAA Lucha Libre Victoria World Cup 2016, an event produced by Lucha Libre AAA Worldwide, where she teamed up with Aja Kong and Natsu Sumire, representing Team Japan and facing Team Canada (Taya Valkyrie, Allie and K. C. Spinelli) in the semi-final of the tournament on June 3. They lost to Team Mexico (Faby Apache, Mari Apache and Lady Apache) in the final of the tournament on June 5. At Assemble Vol. 4, an event produced by Women's Pro-Wrestling Assemble on March 6, 2021, Miyazaki fought Yumi Ohka, Nagisa Nozaki and Sakura Hirota in a four-way match. Miyazaki is a former multiple time Ironman Heavymetalweight Champion, and one milestone event where she competed for it was on March 11, 2007, at the DDT 10th Anniversary: Judgement 2007 event promoted by Dramatic Dream Team, where she faced Exciting Yoshida, Fushicho Karasu, Kikutaro, Naoshi Sano and Taneichi Kacho in a 5 Minute + α Minute Limitless Battle Royal for the title.

=== NEO Japan Pro Wrestling (1999–2010) ===
At NEO The Last Holy Fight In KINEMA from November 28, 2010, Miyazaki teamed up with her long time tag team partner Tanny Mouse to defeat Aya Yuuki and Ryo Mizunami for the NEO Tag Team Championship.

== Championships and accomplishments ==
- All Japan Women's Pro-Wrestling
  - AJW Tag Team Championship (1 time) – with Tanny Mouse
- Dramatic Dream Team/DDT Pro-Wrestling
  - Ironman Heavymetalweight Championship (15 times)
- Ice Ribbon
  - International Ribbon Tag Team Championship (1 time, inaugural) – with Tanny Mouse
- Japanese Women Pro-Wrestling Project
  - JWP Korakuen Tag Team Championship (1 time) – with Tomoko Kuzumi
  - JWP Awards
    - Best Bout Award (2003) with Azumi Hyuga and Kyoko Kimura vs. Command Bolshoi, Erika Watanabe and Kayoko Haruyama on August 16
- NEO Japan Ladies Pro-Wrestling
  - NEO Tag Team Championship (2 times) – with Tanny Mouse
  - NEO Itabashi Tag Team Championship (6 times) – with Tanny Mouse
  - NEO Kitazawa Tag Team Championship (4 times) – with Tanny Mouse
  - NEO Hall Of Fame (2010)
- Pro Wrestling Wave
  - Wave Single Championship (1 time)
  - Wave Tag Team Championship (5 times) – with Nagisa Nozaki (1), Sakura Hirota (1), Yumi Ohka (1), Hibiscus Mii (1) and Yuko Sakurai (1)
  - Catch the Wave Award (4 times)
    - Best Performance Award (2018) shared with Sakura Hirota
    - Best Performance Award (2024) with Honoka vs. Kohaku and Shin Sakura Hirota on June 16
    - Technique Award (2019, 2023)
- World Woman Pro-Wrestling Diana
  - WWWD Queen Elizabeth Championship (2 times)
