= AJW Championship =

Professional wrestling women's championship

Details
- Promotion: All Japan Women's Pro-Wrestling
- Date established: December 15, 1980
- Date retired: April 2005
Statistics
- First champion: Rimi Yokota
- Final champion: Saki Maemura
- Most reigns: Kaoru Ito, Kayo Noumi, Lioness Asuka, Momoe Nakanishi, Sasori and Tomoko Watanabe (2 times)

The AJW Championship was a tertiary belt in All Japan Women's Pro-Wrestling (AJW) promotion. The first champion, in 1980, was Rimi Yokota. During the title's history, no one held the belt more than two times. The belt was abandoned in 2005 after AJW was closed down.

The AJW Championship first design was a brown belt that also represented the AJW Junior Championship. Later, its design was replaced by one inspired on Fabulous Moolah's World Women's Championship belt.

When the IWA World Championship was introduced in AJW in 1988, All Japan Women's Pro Wrestling worked with three regular tertiary singles belts. The WWWA World Single Championship and the All Pacific Championship were the most prestigious (world championship) and the second most prestigious (secondary championship) singles belts, respectively.

== Title history ==
Key
No.	Overall reign number
Reign	Reign number for the specific champion
Days	Number of days held

No.	Champion	Championship change			Reign statistics		Notes	Ref.
No.	Champion	Date	Event	Location	Reign	Days	Notes	Ref.
1	Rimi Yokota	December 15, 1980	Live Event	Tokyo, Japan	1	82	Yokota defeated Nancy Kumi to become the inaugural champion.	
—	Vacated	March 7, 1981	—	—	—	—	The championship was vacated for undocumented reasons.	
2	Devil Masami	May 9, 1981	Live Event	Ōmiya, Saitama, Japan	1	333	Masami defeated Tomoko Kitamura to win the vacant championship.	
—	Vacated	April 7, 1982	—	—	—	—	The championship was vacated for undocumented reasons.	
3	Lioness Asuka	July 19, 1982	Live Event	Tokyo, Japan	1	173	Asuka defeated Masked Yu to win the vacant championship.	
4	Kaoru Matsumoto	January 8, 1983	Live Event	Kumaya, Japan	1	144		
5	Lioness Asuka	June 1, 1983	Live Event	Ōmiya, Saitama, Japan	2	231		
—	Vacated	January 18, 1984	—	—	—	—	The championship was vacated for undocumented reasons.	
6	Itsuki Yamazaki	February 28, 1984	Live Event	Sagamihara, Kanagawa, Japan	1	363	Yamazaki defeated Noriyo Tateno to win the vacant championship.	
—	Vacated	February 25, 1985	—	—	—	—	The championship was vacated for undocumented reasons.	
7	Bull Nakano	July 25, 1985	Live Event	Yamato, Kanagawa, Japan	1	917	Nakano defeated Mika Komatsu in a tournament final to win the vacant championship.	
8	Yumi Ogura	January 28, 1988	Live Event	Nagoya, Aichi, Japan	1	164		
9	Mika Komatsu	July 10, 1988	Stampede live Event	Edmonton, Alberta, Canada	1	(Note: The exact date that the championship was vacated is unknown, meaning the reign lasted between 206 and 233 days.)		
—	Vacated	February 1989	—	—	—	—	The championship was vacated due to Mika Komatsu's retirement from professional wrestling.	
10	Erika Shishido	March 19, 1989	live Event	Tokyo, Japan	1	158	Shishido defeated Manami Toyota to win the vacant championship.	
11	Reibun Amada	August 24, 1989	live Event	Tokyo, Japan	1	(Note: The exact date that the championship was vacated is unknown, meaning the reign lasted between 38 and 68 days.)		
—	Vacated	October 1989	—	—	—	—	The championship was due to Reibun Amada's retirement from professional wrestling.	
12	Manami Toyota	November 18, 1989	live Event	Masuda, Shimane, Japan	1	287	Toyota defeated Mika Takahashi to win the vacant championship.	
—	Vacated	September 1, 1990	—	—	—	—	The championship was vacated for undocumented reasons.	
13	Kyoko Inoue	October 2, 1990	live Event	Yamagata, Yamagata, Japan	1	209	Inoue defeated Takako Inoue to win the vacant championship.	
14	Takako Inoue	April 29, 1991	live Event	Tokyo, Japan	1	366		
15	Mariko Yoshida	April 29, 1992	live Event	Toda, Saitama, Japan	1	77		
16	Sakie Hasegawa	July 15, 1992	live Event	Tokyo, Japan	1	86		
17	Tomoko Watanabe	October 9, 1992	live Event	Chiba, Japan	1	48		
18	Kaoru Ito	November 26, 1992	Dream Rush in Kawasaki	Kawasaki, Kanagawa, Japan	1	76		
19	Debbie Malenko	February 10, 1993	live Event	Kumamoto, Japan	1	(Note: The length of the reign is too uncertain to calculate.)		
—	Vacated	1993	—	—	—	—	The championship was vacated after Debbie Malenko suffered an injury.	
20	Mima Shimoda	September 18, 1993	Zenjo Super Whirlwind - Day 15	Ōmiya, Saitama, Japan	1	203	Shimoda defeated Bat Yoshinaga in a tournament final to win the vacant championship.	
—	Vacated	April 9, 1994	—	—	—	—	Mima Shimoda vacated the championship to concentrate on tag matches with Etsuko Mita.	
21	Kaoru Ito	May 4, 1994	live Event	Toda, Saitama, Japan	2	422	Ito defeated Rie Tamada to win the vacant championship.	
22	Tomoko Watanabe	June 30, 1995	Zenjo Movement 1995 - Day 43	Hakodate, Hokkaido, Japan	2			
—	Vacated	1996	—	—	—	—	The championship was vacated for undocumented reasons.	
23	Kumiko Maekawa	May 4, 1996	Zenjo Finest - Day 4	Toda, Saitama, Japan	1	201	Maekawa defeated Chaparita Asari in a tournament final to win the vacant championship.	
24	Rie Tamada	November 21, 1996	Tag League The Best - Day 31	Kobe, Hyōgo, Japan	1	(Note: The exact date that the championship was vacated is unknown, meaning the reign lasted between 375 and 405 days.)		
—	Vacated	December 1997	—	—	—	—	The championship was vacated for undocumented reasons.	
25	Momoe Nakanishi	December 12, 1997	live Event	Chiba, Japan	1	43	Nakanishi defeated Sachie Nishibori to win the vacant championship.	
26	Emi Motokawa	January 24, 1998	New Year Zenjo "VOW" - Day 10	Hamamatsu, Shizuoka, Japan	1	78		
27	Momoe Nakanishi	April 12, 1998	New Year Zenjo "VOW" - Day 10	Hamamatsu, Shizuoka, Japan	2			
—	Vacated	1999	—	—	—	—	The championship was vacated after Momoe Nakanishi reached to championship defense limit.	
28	Nanae Takahashi	March 1, 2000	live Event	Fukuoka, Japan	1	200	Takahashi defeated Miyuki Fujii in a four-woman tournament final to win the vacant championship.	
29	Miho Wakizawa	September 17, 2000	Zenjo Stroke	Tokyo, Japan	1	251		
30	Rumi Kazama	May 26, 2001	live Event	Tokyo, Japan	1	<1		
—	Vacated	May 26, 2001	live Event	Tokyo, Japan	—	—	Rumi Kazama vacated the championship immediately after winning it.	
31	Kayo Noumi	July 27, 2001	Japan Grand Prix	Tokyo, Japan	1	61	Noumi defeated Miho Wakizawa in a tournament final to win the vacant championship.	
32	Kayoko Haruyama	September 26, 2001	JWP Flappers	Tokyo, Japan	1	100		
33	Kayo Noumi	January 4, 2002	Foture Shock - Day 2	Tokyo, Japan	2	261		
—	Vacated	September 22, 2002	—	—	—	—	Kayo Noumi vacated the championship in order to participate in the tournament for the All Pacific Championship, which occurred on October 2, 2002.	
34	Miyuki Fujii	October 8, 2002	live Event	Mie, Japan	1	52	Fujii defeated Mika Nishio to win the vacant championship.	
35	Kaori Yoneyama	November 29, 2002	New Wrestlemarinepiad	Tokyo, Japan	1	36		
36	Mika Nishio	January 4, 2003	New Wrestlemarinepiad	Tokyo, Japan	1	(Note: The exact date that the championship was vacated is unknown, meaning the reign lasted between 148 and 166 days.)		
—	Vacated	June 2003	—	—	—	—	The championship was vacated after Mika Nishio left AJW.	
37	Sasori	June 19, 2003	live Event	Kanazawa, Ishikawa, Japan	2	88	Sasori defeated Saki Maemura to win the vacant championship. Sasori is formerly known as Miyuki Fujii.	
38	Hikaru	September 15, 2003	Potential Power - Day 1	Tokyo, Japan	1	110		
39	Saki Maemura	January 3, 2004	The Legend of Women's Pro Wrestling - Day 1	Tokyo, Japan	1	(Note: The exact date that AJW closed is unknown, meaning the reign lasted between 454 and 483 days.)		
—	Deactivated	April 2005	—	—	—	—	The championship retired when AJW closed.	

== Combined reigns ==
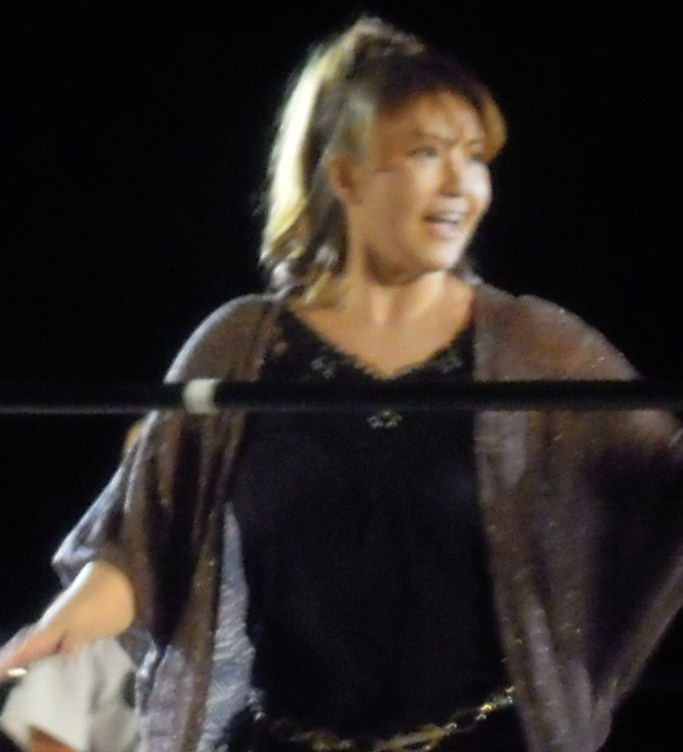
One-time and longest reigning AJW Champion Bull Nakano

¤	The exact length of a title reign is uncertain; the combined length may not be correct.
N/A	The exact length of a title reign is too uncertain to calculate.

Rank	Wrestler	No. of reigns	Combined days
1	Bull Nakano	1	917
2	Kaoru Ito	2	498
3	Saki Maemura	1	454 – 483¤
4	Lioness Asuka	2	404
5	Rie Tamada	1	375 – 405¤
6	Takako Inoue	1	366
7	Itsuki Yamazaki	1	363
8	Devil Masami	1	333
9	Kayo Noumi	2	322
10	Manami Toyota	1	287
11	Miho Wakizawa	1	251
12	Kyoko Inoue	1	209
13	Mika Komatsu	1	206 – 233¤
14	Mima Shimoda	1	203
15	Kumiko Maekawa	1	201
16	Nanae Takahashi	1	200
17	Yumi Ogura	1	164
18	Erika Shishido	1	158
19	Mika Nishio	1	148 – 166¤
20	Kaoru Matsumoto	1	144
21	Miyuki Fujii/Sasori	2	140
22	Kayoko Haruyama	2	136
23	Hikaru	1	110
24	Sakie Hasegawa	1	86
25	Rimi Yokota	1	82
26	Emi Motokawa	1	78
27	Mariko Yoshida	1	77
28	Tomoko Watanabe	2	48¤
29	Momoe Nakanishi	2	43¤
30	Reibun Amada	1	38 – 68¤
31	Rumi Kazama	1	<1
-	Debbie Malenko	1	N/A

== See also ==
- List of professional wrestling promotions in Japan
- List of women's wrestling promotions
- Professional wrestling in Japan
