= Momoe Nakanishi =

Japanese professional wrestler

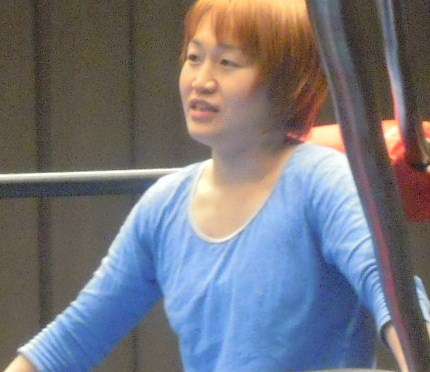
- Nakanishi during her Ice Ribbon exhibition match in March 2011

Personal information
- Born: Momoe Nakanishi; July 7, 1980 (age 46) Fujiidera, Osaka
- Spouse: Makoto Oe (m. 2005)
- Children: 4

Professional wrestling career
- Ring name(s): Momo☆ Momoe Nakanishi; Momoe Oe
- Billed height: 1.57 m (5 ft 2 in)
- Billed weight: 60 kg (132 lb)
- Trained by: All Japan Women's Pro-Wrestling; Masanobu Kurisu
- Debut: July 14, 1996
- Retired: January 7, 2005

Momoe Oe (大江 百重, Ōe Momoe; born July 7, 1980), better known by her maiden name Momoe Nakanishi (中西 百重, Nakanishi Momoe), is a Japanese retired professional wrestler. She made her debut for All Japan Women's Pro-Wrestling (AJW) in July 1996 at the age of sixteen and during the next seven years, won all of the promotion's top titles, including the WWWA World Single Championship and the WWWA World Tag Team Championship. In 2003, Nakanishi quit AJW to become a freelancer and went on to win the AtoZ World Championship later that same year and the NEO Single and NWA Women's Pacific Championships in 2004. Nakanishi retired from professional wrestling on January 7, 2005, at the age of just twenty-four. She now works as a trainer at the U.W.F. Snakepit gym.

== Professional wrestling career ==
=== All Japan Women's Pro-Wrestling (1996–2003) ===
After graduating from junior high school in 1996, Nakanishi, with a sports background in gymnastics, joined the All Japan Women's Pro-Wrestling (AJW) promotion for a career in professional wrestling. She made her in-ring debut later that same year on July 14 at the age of sixteen, facing fellow debutant Nanae Takahashi at an event in Tokyo's Korakuen Hall. For the first months of her career, Nakanishi worked exclusively with other AJW rookies, winning her first title, the AJW Junior Championship on March 23, 1997. During the summer of 1997, Nakanishi was finally given her chance to break out, after several AJW veterans had quit the promotion, and despite her inexperience and small stature, began being recognized as one of the top workers in the promotion. Her breakout match took place on October 18, when she and Kumiko Maekawa faced Las Cachorras Orientales (Etsuko Mita and Mima Shimoda) in Yokohama. Maekawa's regular tag team partner Tomoko Watanabe was unable to attend the event and had to be replaced by Nakanishi. Though Nakanishi was pinned by Shimoda for the win, her performance was praised, with Chris Zavisa of the Pro Wrestling Torch Newsletter writing "[she] turned in a performance worthy of a five-year veteran ranked among the world's ten best workers" and "she has more talent than any new prospect this decade". Nakanishi finished off her 1997 by teaming with Takahashi to win the AJW Tag Team Championship on November 23 and finally winning the AJW Championship on December 12. At the end of her second year in professional wrestling, AJW named Nakanishi the promotion's MVP of 1997. The following year, Nakanishi won both the AJW Championship and AJW Tag Team Championship once more, before defeating Chaparita Asari on July 11, 1999, for her first World Women's Wrestling Association (WWWA) title, the World Super Lightweight Championship.

In 2000, Nakanishi and fellow AJW youngsters Nanae Takahashi and Miho Wakizawa formed an idol group named Kiss no Sekai. The group later recorded and released a music album together. Nakanishi and Takahashi continued teaming together in the ring and on July 16, 2000, won AJW's top tag team title, the WWWA World Tag Team Championship, for the first time by defeating Las Cachorras Orientales. After a six-month reign, the team, dubbed Nana☆Momo☆, lost the title back to LCO. During the summer of 2001, Nakanishi won the 2001 Japan Grand Prix, after which she began chasing the All Pacific Championship, leading to her winning the title on February 24, 2002. On May 2, 2002, Nakanishi made a rare appearance for New Japan Pro-Wrestling (NJPW), a male promotion, which normally did not hold any female wrestling matches, teaming with Kaoru Ito in a tag team match at the Tokyo Dome, where they defeated Manami Toyota and Yumiko Hotta. The following July, Nana☆Momo☆ regained the WWWA World Tag Team Championship from Rumi Kazama and Takako Inoue. On September 8, 2002, Nakanishi vacated the All Pacific Championship in order to concentrate on winning AJW's top title, the WWWA World Single Championship. On October 20, 2002, she defeated the much larger Ito to win the WWWA World Single Championship and become the top wrestler in AJW. At the end of the year, the Tokyo Sports magazine named Nakanishi the 2002 joshi wrestler of the year. After a seven-month reign at the top of AJW, Nakanishi lost the WWWA World Single Championship to Ayako Hamada on May 11, 2003, in the main event of AJW's 35th anniversary event. Just two months later, Nakanishi surprisingly announced that she was quitting AJW.

=== Freelancing (2003–2005) ===
After leaving AJW, Nakanishi became a freelancer, working for promotions such as Gaea Japan, Major Girl's Fighting AtoZ, and NEO Japan Ladies Pro Wrestling, while also forming the short-lived M's Style promotion with Mariko Yoshida, Michiko Ohmukai and Mika Akino. During 2003, she also took part in the third Kunoichi (Women of Ninja Warrior) competition, where she made it past the first two stages. In AtoZ, Nakanishi became the first AtoZ World Champion on November 9, 2003, while in NEO, she won the NEO Stage tournament on January 17, 2004. Nakanishi followed up her NEO Stage win by defeating Yoshiko Tamura on March 12 to win the NEO Single and NWA Women's Pacific Championships. In May 2004, Nakanishi wrestled two matches for All Japan Pro Wrestling, another promotion mainly featuring male wrestlers. After two successful defenses, Nakanishi lost the NEO Single and NWA Women's Pacific Championships to Misae Genki on August 14, 2004. The following month, Nakanishi announced that she was retiring from professional wrestling. On January 7, 2005, Nakanishi produced her retirement event at Korakuen Hall. In the opening match of the event, she teamed with Kuishinbo Kamen in a comedy tag team match, where they defeated Ebessan and Ebekosan, who during the match unmasked as Nakanishi's old associate Ayako Hamada. Later, in the main event of the evening, Nakanishi was defeated in her retirement match by her longtime tag team partner Nanae Takahashi.

=== Post-retirement ===
On March 19, 2011, Nakanishi, billed under her married name Momoe Oe, made her first professional wrestling appearance in six years, when she appeared at an Ice Ribbon event, which led to the promotion's founder, Emi Sakura, challenging her to an exhibition match. The match took place two days later at Ice Ribbon March 2011 in Tokyo's Korakuen Hall and ended in a 1–1 draw. Originally billed as a three-minute exhibition match, the match ended up lasting closer to five minutes, with Oe winning the first fall with her signature finishing maneuver, the Momo☆Latch, before being pinned for the draw with a la magistral. After the time-limit had already expired, Nakanishi pinned Sakura for another three count with a bridging German suplex.

On May 8, 2014, it was announced that Oe would return to wrestle another exhibition match at Passion Red's May 24 event, where she and Nanae Takahashi would face Miho Wakizawa and Natsuki☆Taiyo. The match ended in a five-minute time limit draw.

== Personal life ==
Nakanishi's father, Shigezo, is also involved in professional wrestling as the owner of the Japan Pro-Wrestling 2000 promotion. On January 23, 2005, Nakanishi married Makoto Oe, a kickboxer, UWF International alum and a trainer at U.W.F. Snakepit, adopting his surname in the process. The Oes have four children together: Mai (まい, Mai; born January 5, 2006), Mei (芽生, Mei; born June 18, 2008), Mitsuki (みつき, Mitsuki; born June 8, 2010), and Yūki (ゆうき, Yūki; born March 14, 2014). Momoe currently holds gymnastics classes at the U.W.F. Snakepit gym on Saturdays.

== Championships and accomplishments ==
- All Japan Women's Pro-Wrestling
  - AJW Championship (2 times)
  - AJW Junior Championship (1 time)
  - AJW Tag Team Championship (2 times) – with Nanae Takahashi
  - All Pacific Championship (1 time)
  - WWWA World Single Championship (1 time)
  - WWWA World Super Lightweight Championship (1 time)
  - WWWA World Tag Team Championship (2 times) – with Nanae Takahashi
  - 1996 Rookie of the Year Decision Tournament
  - Japan Grand Prix (2001)
  - Tag League the Best (1998) – with Nanae Takahashi
  - Tag League the Best (2002) – with Kayo Noumi
  - MVP Award (1997)
- Major Girl's Fighting AtoZ
  - AtoZ World Championship (1 time)
  - AtoZ World Championship Tournament (2003)
- NEO Japan Ladies Pro Wrestling
  - NEO Single Championship (1 time)
  - NWA Women's Pacific Championship (1 time)
  - NEO Stage (2004)
- Tokyo Sports
  - Joshi Puroresu Grand Prize (2002)
