= Jaguar Yokota =

Japanese former professional wrestler and wrestling trainer (born 1961

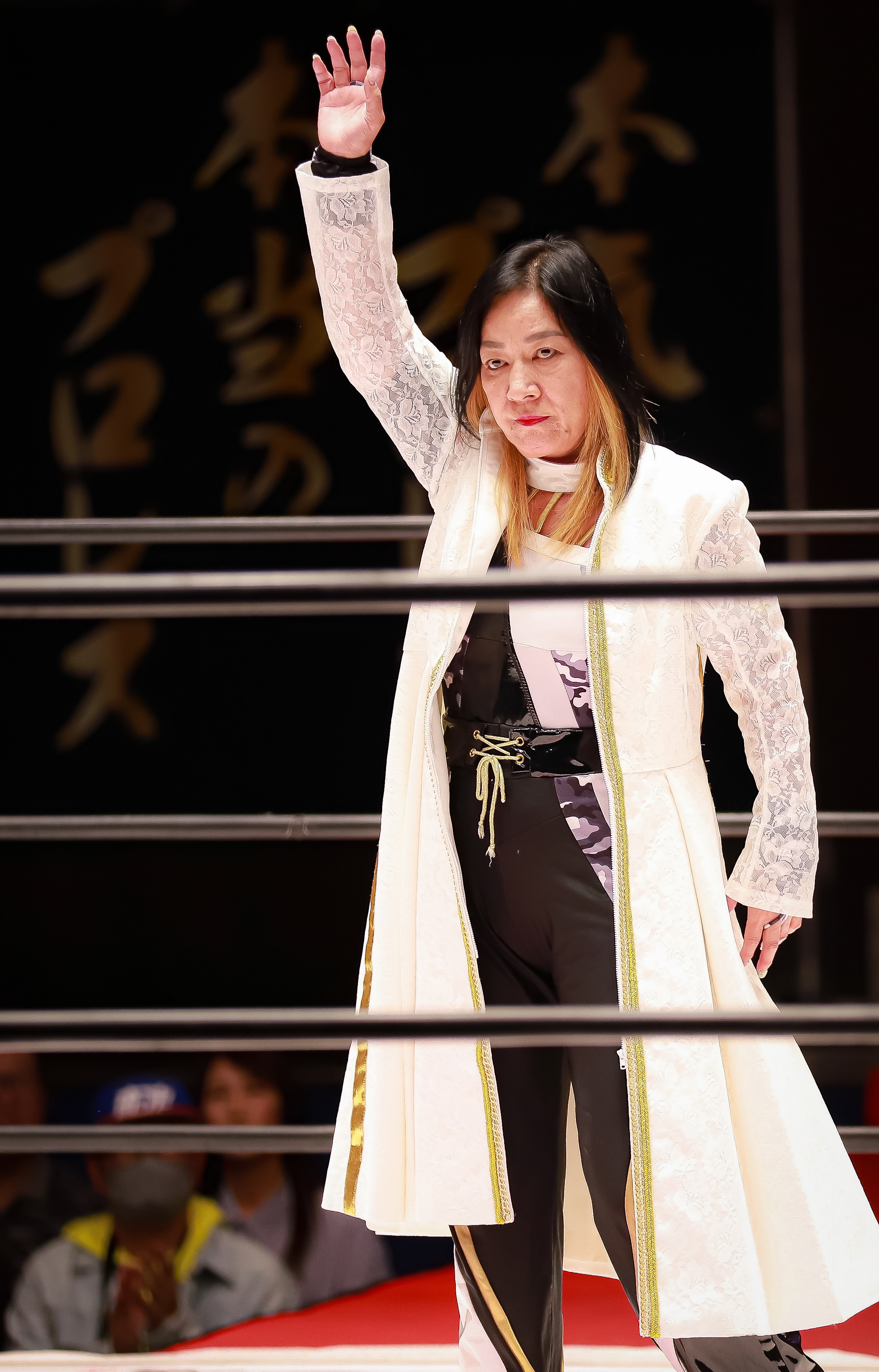
- Yokota in April 2023

Personal information
- Born: Rimi Yokota; July 25, 1961 (age 64) Arakawa, Tokyo, Japan
- Spouse: Hirokatsu Kinoshita (m. 2004)
- Children: 1

Professional wrestling career
- Ring names: Remi Kinoshita; Jaguar Y; Jaguar Yokota; Monster Y
- Billed height: 159 cm (5 ft 3 in)
- Billed weight: 58 kg (128 lb)
- Trained by: All Japan Women's Pro-Wrestling
- Debut: June 28, 1977

Rimi Yokota (横田 利美, Yokota Rimi) (born July 25, 1961) is a Japanese professional wrestler and later wrestling trainer, who wrestled under the name Jaguar Yokota (ジャガー横田). She is currently signed to World Woman Pro-Wrestling Diana, where she is the leader of the CRYSIS stable. Yokota is widely considered one of the greatest female wrestlers of all time, and during her heyday in the early 1980s, was considered one of the best wrestlers in the world, irrespective of gender.

== Professional wrestling career ==
=== All Japan Women's Pro Wrestling (1977–1986) ===
Yokota was inspired to join All Japan Women's Pro Wrestling (AJW) by 1970s stars, the Beauty Pair. Yokota started training to be a professional wrestler on March 1, 1977, and got her professional wrestling license on May 19. Yokota then made her in-ring debut on June 28, 1977, in Tokyo at the age of 15, against Mayumi Takahashi. Afterwards, Yokota formed the Young Pair tag team with Seiko Honawa. She won her first belt on January 4, 1980, when she became the AJW Junior Champion, which she vacated in August. Yokota then began teaming with Jumbo Hori.

On December 15, 1980, Yokota defeated Nancy Kumi to become the inaugural AJW Champion, then won the WWWA World Tag Team Championship with Jumbo Hori two days later. On February 25, 1981, she achieved her greatest success to that point, defeating her original inspiration, Jackie Sato, for the WWWA World Single Championship. She was 19 years old at the time of her first title reign. She lost her first world championship to La Galáctica on May 7, 1983, in a mask vs. hair match, then won it back a month later. During her second world title run, she had very notable feuds with Devil Masami and Lioness Asuka. On September 17, 1984, Yokota won the UWA World Women's Championship by defeating La Galáctica. Yokota then went on a tour in Mexico. In late 1985, Yokota had to vacate the WWWA World Single Championship due to a shoulder injury. In February 1986, Yokota retired from in-ring competition.

=== All Japan Women's Pro Wrestling (1994–1996) ===
On November 20, 1994, Yokota returned from retirement to wrestle at Big Egg Wrestling Universe. She teamed up with Bison Kimura and went to a 10-minute time limit draw against Lioness Asuka and Yumi Ogura. According to Yokota, this inspired her to return to wrestling full-time.

=== Jd' (1995–1998) ===
In 1995 she came out of retirement to form her promotion JDStar, and wrestled as its top star until December 26, 1998, when she retired for a second time following a match against her long-time rival Devil Masami.

=== Retirement (1998–2004) ===
Yokota stayed retired from 1998 to 2004, as she started to have a family.

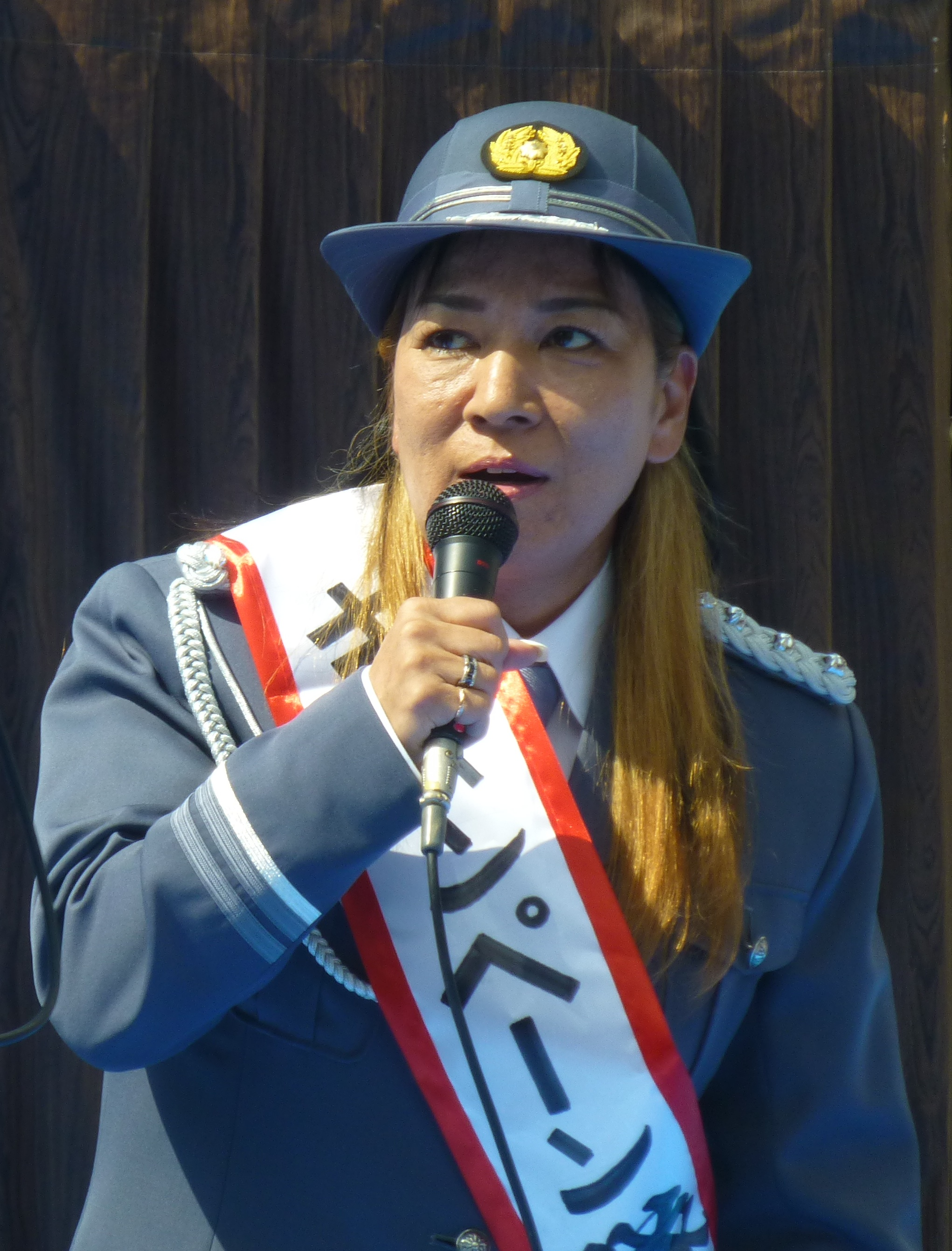
Yokota speaking in 2016

=== Freelance (2004–present) ===
She has since returned to professional wrestling as a freelancer, including a stint as part of the Monster faction in Hustle as Jaguar Y.

== As a trainer ==
After retiring in 1986, Yokota became one of All Japan Women's Pro Wrestling's (AJW) top trainers. She trained many of the wrestlers who became AJW's top stars during the 1990s.

=== Wrestlers trained ===
- Akira Hokuto
- Aja Kong
- Bison Kimura
- Combat Toyoda
- Cooga
- Etsuko Mita
- KAORU
- Kyoko Inoue
- Manami Toyota
- Mariko Yoshida
- Megumi Kudo
- Mima Shimoda
- Sumie Sakai
- Takako Inoue
- Toshiyo Yamada
- Yoshiko Tamura

== Personal life ==
Yokota married in August 2004 to Hirokatsu Kinoshita, who is a doctor, a professor at Kamakura Women's University, and the lead vocalist for the obscure but seminal 1980s Hokkaido-based hardcore band "Tranquilizer." She is seven years his senior. In November 2006, she gave birth to their only son, Taishi.

== Championships and accomplishments ==
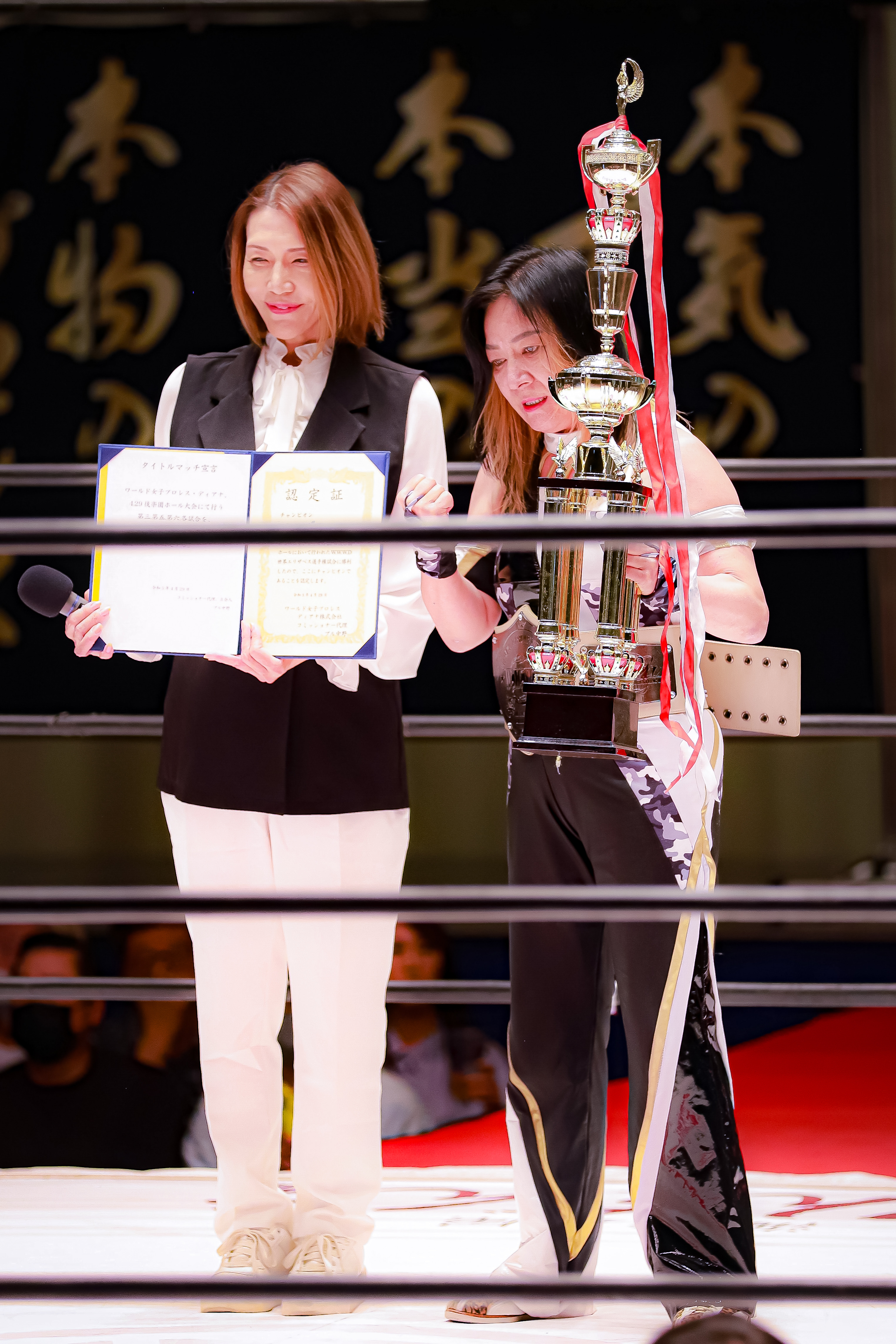
Yokota is a three-time Diana Queen Elizabeth Champion

- All Japan Women's Pro-Wrestling

- AJW Championship (1 time)
- AJW Junior Championship (1 time)
- WWWA World Single Championship (2 times)
- WWWA World Tag Team Championship (1 time) – with Jumbo Hori
- AJW Hall of Fame (1998)

- Guinness World Records

- Oldest (female) pair to win a professional tag team wrestling championship (2023) – with Mayumi Ozaki

- JDStar

- AWF World Women's Championship (1 time)
- TWF World Women's Championship (1 time)
- TWF World Tag Team Championship (1 time) – with Yuko Kosugi

- Oz Academy
  - Oz Academy Tag Team Championship (1 time) – with Mayumi Ozaki
  - Oz Academy Pioneer 3-Way Championship (1 time)
- Universal Wrestling Association

- UWA World Women's Championship (1 time)

- World Woman Pro-Wrestling Diana

- WWWD Queen Elizabeth Championship (3 times, inaugural)
- WWWD Tag Team Championship (2 times) – with Sareee (1) and Ayako Sato (1)

- Wrestling Observer Newsletter awards

- Wrestling Observer Newsletter Hall of Fame (Class of 1996)

== Luchas de Apuestas record ==
Winner (wager)	Loser (wager)	Location	Event	Date	Notes
La Galáctica (mask)	Jaguar Yokota (hair)	Kawasaki, Kanagawa, Japan	AJW Big Power Series '83 - Tag 1 ~ 15th Anniversary Special Event	May 7, 1983	
