= List of women's wrestling promotions =

This is a list of women's professional wrestling promotions, sorted by country's and lists both active and defunct "indy promotions" and major promotions.

== Japan ==
Name	Location	Owner(s)	Years active	Notes
Actwres girl'Z	Tokyo	Super Project Co. Ltd	2015–present	
Ice Ribbon	Warabi	Neoplus	2006–present	
Ladies Legend Pro-Wrestling	Tokyo	Rumie Kazama; Shinobu Kandori	1992–present	
Oz Academy	Tokyo	Mayumi Ozaki	1998–present	
Pro Wrestling Wave	Tokyo	Zabun Co, Ltd.	2007–present	
Sendai Girls' Pro Wrestling	Sendai	Meiko Satomura	2005–present	
Tokyo Joshi Pro Wrestling	Tokyo	CyberFight (CyberAgent)	2012–present	Founded by Tetsuya Koda and Nozomi. Sister promotion to DDT Pro Wrestling, became a standalone entity in 2015.
World Wonder Ring Stardom	Tokyo	Bushiroad	2010–present	Founded by Rossy Ogawa, Nanae Takahashi and Fuka. Acquired by Bushiroad in October 2019 and became a sister promotion to New Japan Pro-Wrestling.
Defunct
All Japan Women's Pro-Wrestling	Tokyo	Kunimatsu Matsunaga; Takashi Matsunaga	1968–2005	
Arsion	Tokyo	Hiroshi Ogawa	1997–2003	
Gaea Japan	Tokyo	Yuka Sugiyama	1995–2005	
Jd'	Tokyo	Yoshimoto Kogyo Company; J Office Group	1995–2007	
JWP Joshi Puroresu	Tokyo	Kiyoshi Shinozaki; Masatoshi Yamamoto	1992–2017	

== United Kingdom ==
Name	Location	Owner(s)	Years active	Notes
Bellatrix Female Warriors	Norfolk Essex	Saraya Knight	2006–present	Female-only wrestling promotion originally known as World Association of Women's Wrestling up until 1 January 2013.
Pro-Wrestling: EVE	All over Great Britain	Dann Read	2010–present	

== United States ==
Promotion name	Location	Promoter(s)	Years active	Notes
Mission Pro Wrestling	Buda, Texas	Thunder Rosa	2020–present	
Professional Girl Wrestling Association	Raleigh, North Carolina	Randy Powell	1992–present	
Queens of Combat	Charlotte, North Carolina	Josette Bynum	2004–present	
Shine Wrestling	Ybor City, Florida	Dave Prazak and Lexie Fyfe	2012–present	WWNLive brand
Spark Joshi Puroresu of America	Santa Fe, New Mexico	"Chibi C.B." C.B. Liffer and Francis Jay	2023–present	
Sukeban	New York, New York	Dream Slam Productions	2013–present	
Ultimate Women of Wrestling	Los Angeles, California	Rampage Jackson	2022-present	
Women of Wrestling	Los Angeles, California	David McLane	2000–2001; 2012-present	
Women Superstars United	New Jersey	Jac Sabboth (2006–2007); Sean McCaffrey (2007–2012); Drew Cordeiro (2012–2014); D. J. Hyde (2013–present)	2006–present	Sister promotion to Combat Zone Wrestling and member of the United Wrestling Network
Women's Wrestling Army	Chicago, Illinois	Maria Kanellis	2022-present	
Women's Wrestling Revolution	Providence, Rhode Island	Drew Cordeiro	2016-present	Sister promotion to Beyond Wrestling
Defunct
ChickFight	San Francisco, California	Jason Deadrich	2004–2008	
Dangerous Women of Wrestling	Philadelphia, Pennsylvania	Steve O'Neill, Dan Kowal	1999–2007	Formerly "Gorgeous Ladies of Outrageous Wrestling" until 2003
Gorgeous Ladies of Wrestling (G.L.O.W.)	Las Vegas, Nevada	Meshulam Riklis (1986–2001); Ursula Hayden (2001-2003)	1986-2003	
Ladies Major League Wrestling	Florida	Howard Brody	1989–1992	
Ladies International Wrestling Association	North Carolina	The Fabulous Moolah	1990-2000	
Ladies Professional Wrestling Association	Laughlin, Nevada	Tor Berg	1989–1998	
Naked Women's Wrestling League	Las Vegas, Nevada	Howard Mann	2004–2009	
Powerful Women of Wrestling	Indianapolis, Indiana	David McLane	1987–1990	
Rise Wrestling	Naperville, Illinois	Kevin Harvey	2016–2020	
Shimmer Women Athletes	Berwyn, Illinois	Dave Prazak and Allison Danger	2005–2021	
Women's Extreme Wrestling	Philadelphia, Pennsylvania	Dan Kowal, Greg Bagarozy, Steve Karel	2002–2008	
World Women's Wrestling	Jamaica Plain, Massachusetts	Sheldon Goldberg	2006–2010	
World Women's Wrestling Association	Los Angeles, California	Mildred Burke	1950–1960	
Wrestlicious	Tampa, Florida	Jonathan Vargas, Johnny Cafarella, and Jimmy Hart	2009–2010	

== Other countries ==
Promotion name	Location	Promoter(s)	Years active	Notes
Femmes Fatales	Montreal, Canada	François Poirier; Phil Bélanger	2009–present	Formerly known as nCw Femmes Fatales.
Women's Wrestling Syndicate	Montreal, Canada	LuFisto	2023–present	
Defunct
Pro Wrestling Women's Alliance	New South Wales, Australia	Madison Eagles	2007–2013	
