= Nicole Bass =

American bodybuilder (1964–2017)

Personal information
- Born: August 10, 1964 Queens, New York City, U.S.
- Died: February 17, 2017 (aged 52) Queens, New York City, U.S.
- Spouse: Bob Fuchs (m. 1985; died 2013)

Professional wrestling career
- Billed height: 6 ft 4 in (193 cm)
- Billed weight: 241 lb (109 kg)
- Billed from: New York City
- Trained by: ECW House of Hardcore
- Debut: August 15, 1998
- Retired: June 15, 2002

Nicole Fuchs (née Bass; August 10, 1964 – February 17, 2017) was an American bodybuilder, actress, professional wrestler, and professional wrestling valet. She worked for companies such as Extreme Championship Wrestling, World Wrestling Federation and XPW. From 1993 until her death, she made numerous appearances on The Howard Stern Show and took part as a contestant in Stern's 1993 pay-per-view television event The Miss Howard Stern New Year's Eve Pageant. She then became a member of the show's Wack Pack and appeared in Stern's movie Private Parts.

She made guest appearances on four soap operas: The Bold and the Beautiful and Days of Our Lives in 1991, and General Hospital and Guiding Light in 1992.

== Early life ==
Bass was born in Middle Village in Queens, New York.

== Bodybuilding career ==
Bass was a bodybuilder in the late 1980s and throughout the 1990s. She won the 1997 NPC National Bodybuilding Championship.

Year	Body	Competition	Division	Placing
1985	NPC	Eastern USA Championships	Heavyweight	2nd
1986	IFBB	Ms. International	Heavyweight	16th
1986	NPC	Nationals	Heavyweight	8th
1987	IFBB	North American Championships	Heavyweight	4th
1987	NPC	USA Championships	Heavyweight	7th
1988	NPC	Northeastern States	Heavyweight & Overall	1st
1989	NPC	Extravaganza	Heavyweight	3rd
1990	NPC	Nationals	Heavyweight	2nd
1991	IFBB	North American Championships	Heavyweight	4th
1993	NPC	Nationals	Heavyweight	10th
1994	NPC	Nationals	Heavyweight	6th
1995	NPC	Nationals	Heavyweight	2nd
1996	NPC	Nationals	Heavyweight	2nd
1997	NPC	Nationals	Heavyweight & Overall	1st
1997	IFBB	Ms. Olympia		14th

== Professional wrestling career ==
=== Extreme Championship Wrestling (1998–1999) ===
Trained by Extreme Championship Wrestling, she started her professional wrestling career in Japan in August 1998 for NEO Women's Pro Wrestling, where she won a tournament by defeating Kyoko Inoue. Bass debuted in ECW during the first half of 1998. She aligned herself with Justin Credible, Jason Knight and Chastity. She participated in feuds with Tommy Dreamer, Mikey Whipwreck and Beulah McGillicutty.

=== World Wrestling Federation (1999) ===
Bass soon joined the World Wrestling Federation (WWF), debuting as Sable's villainous bodyguard at WrestleMania XV on March 28, 1999. She became involved in an extended feud with Debra McMichael, which culminated in a mixed tag match pitting Bass and Val Venis against Jeff Jarrett and Debra at the 1999 WWF Over the Edge, which took place directly after the death of Owen Hart at that pay-per-view. On the June 7th episode of Raw Is War, Bass was then aligned with Venis until she accidentally whacked him with Jarrett's guitar after losing a bikini contest to Debra. The following week, she interfered in a match between Debra and Ivory, with Debra losing her Women's Championship due to Nicole's interference.

This led to a brief alliance between Bass and Ivory, which ended abruptly when Bass left the WWF in July 1999 and filed a lawsuit against the organization for sexual harassment, claiming she was sexually assaulted backstage by Steve Lombardi. In 2003, the case went to court and was ultimately dismissed.

=== Independent circuit (1999–2002) ===
Bass continued to wrestle on the independent wrestling circuit and did bookings for public events and for personal training while also working for Xtreme Pro Wrestling and Combat Zone Wrestling. She wrestled her last match in 2002.

== Personal life ==
Bass was married to Richard "Bob" Fuchs from 1985 until his death in 2013. At the time of her death, Bass was in a relationship with her business partner, Kristen Marrone.

In 2006, Bass was hospitalized due to steroid-influenced pancreatitis.

== Death ==
On February 16, 2017, Bass's girlfriend Kristen Marrone posted a statement on Bass' official Facebook stating that Bass had been hospitalized after being found unconscious at her apartment. Later that day, Bass was declared to be medically brain dead following a heart attack. Her family and friends were with her that evening as she was taken off life support. Bass died on February 17 at the age of 52.

== Filmography ==
Year	Title	Role	Notes
1997	Private Parts	Herself	Film debut
1999	Pain and Suffering		
2000	Spank Those Bitches 2		
2000	I Love To Hurt You		
2000	Violence on Violence	Julie's Friend	
2000	Beat Your Ass	Kristi's Mistress	
2000	Man Handled		

== Championships and accomplishments ==
=== Professional wrestling ===
- Champion Wrestling Federation
  - CWF Women's Championship (1 time)
- National Wrestling Alliance
  - NWA Worldwide Intergender Championship (1 time)
- NWA New Jersey
  - NWA Jersey Women's Championship (1 time)

== See also ==
- List of premature professional wrestling deaths
