= JDStar =

Japanese women's professional wrestling promotion

- Acronym: JDStar
- Founded: 1995
- Defunct: 2007
- Style: Women's professional wrestling
- Headquarters: Tokyo, Japan
- Founder: Jaguar Yokota
- Owner: Kiyu Uji
- Successor: Pro Wrestling Wave

JDStar (also spelt Jd') was a women's professional wrestling promotion based in Tokyo, Japan. In the wake of the joshi puroresu boom of the early 1990s, several different groups opened with distinct approaches. The Jd'Star promotion, with its subtitle, "Beauty Athlete," summed up the company's approach.

== History ==
Jaguar Yokota came out of retirement to announce the formation of her new promotion, JDStar, at a press conference in 1995. She was initially the focal point of their shows but left the promotion in 1998. After her departure, JDStar was bought by Kiyu Uji.

The company had a large roster but no rookies with the ability or personality to attract attention. In 2001, Hidenobu Ichimaru bought JDStar from Kiyu Uji and established a new gimmick to promote JDStar's talent: The "athtress" (athlete-actress), an aspiring actress/singer/model whose good looks would be used to market their athleticism in the wrestling ring and establish them as idols.

The first run of "athresses" had few skills and fanfare dropped slightly. This created more controversy than anything and the promotion's attempt to create an idol never caught on. Also dropping was the wrestlers' respect for Ichimaru, as several established veterans in joshi puroresu thought the "athtresses" didn't deserve to be in the same ring as them.

JDStar continued to flounder before ultimately folding in July 2007.

== Roster ==
JD' moulded the careers of several new wrestlers with Uji in charge, including The Bloody, Fang Suzuki, and Sumie Sakai, who is also well known for wrestling for several independent promotions on the American east coast.

The second run of Athtresses was the most famous group, featuring Emi Tojo, Yumi Ohka, Kei Akiyama and Asami Kawasaki. JDStar also moved into its home building, Shin-Kiba 1st Ring, later that year, and sold it out on their first show. The biggest surprise came in May of that year when Jaguar Yokota came back to the promotion, teaming with Lioness Asuka against Yumi Ohka and Emi Tojo, and picking up the win over Ohka. The third run of the Athtress program was its last, and Fuka and Shuu Shibutani were the last two girls to run through the program. Both have seen much fanfare and success, with Shu becoming a popular wrestler through her training with Mariko Yoshida's Ibuki group, which showcases the best young talents that Japan has to offer. Early in 2007, another rookie, Misaki Ohata, debuted with the promotion. She was trained by Yoshida throughout 2006.

== Championships ==
=== JDStar ===
Championship	Final champion(s)	Reign	Date won	Previous champion(s)
Jd' Junior Championship	Maru	2	July 5, 2003	Teruko Kagawa

=== American Wrestling Federation ===
Championship	Final champion(s)	Reign	Date won	Previous champion(s)
AWF World Women's Championship	Jaguar Yokota	1	July 21, 2004	Tanny Mouse

=== Trans World Federation ===
Championship	Final champion(s)	Reign	Date won	Previous champion(s)
TWF World Women's Championship	Yoshiko Tamura	2	June 19, 2005	Vacant
TWF World Women's Tag Team Championship	Fang Suzuki and Gami	1 (6, 3)	December 17, 2005	Vacant

=== Other ===
Championship	Final champion(s)	Reign	Date won	Previous champion(s)
BS Japan Queen Of The Ring Championship	Hanako Kanimiso	1	August 10, 2003	Fang Suzuki
Princess of Pro-Wrestling Championship	Arisa Nakajima	1	June 17, 2007	Vacant
