= Puroresu =

Japanese professional wrestling

Puroresu (Note: プロレス, puro-resu) is a Japanese term referring to professional wrestling in Japan and abroad. It is a loanword that stems from the Japanese pronunciation of "professional wrestling", (Note: プロフェッショナル・レスリング, purofesshonaru resuringu) which is abbreviated in Japanese to puro (Note: プロ, pro) and resu. (Note: レス, resu (an abbreviation of "wrestling"))

Puroresu grew out of American professional wrestling but has become a separate entity based on Japanese culture that is distinct in its psychology, presentation, and function. It is treated much more like a legitimate competition, with fewer theatrics, and storylines are often focused on a wrestler's "fighting spirit" (Note: 闘魂, tōkon) and perseverance. Professional wrestling in Japan led to the development of shoot wrestling and has been closely related to mixed martial arts, starting with Shooto and Pancrase, organizations which predate the UFC, and has influenced subsequent promotions such as Fighting Network Rings and Pride Fighting Championships. There is more overlap between professional wrestling and mixed martial arts in Japan than any other country.

A puroresu match in Kanagawa, 2024

== Overview ==
Puroresu emphasises the "fighting spirit" of its wrestlers, who often use full contact strikes. Many Japanese professional wrestlers have some degree of training in martial arts and wrestling, and it is common for doctors and trainers to wait at ringside and assist them after a match due to the risk of injuries. Most matches have "clean finishes", endings in which a competitor wins decisively without cheating or interference, and many promotions do not use any scripted storylines or characters at all. Japanese wrestling is related to mixed martial arts promotions. Puroresu is highly respected and popular in Japan, frequently drawing huge crowds for the major promotions. Due to this view of wrestling and the relationship of puroresu with other martial arts disciplines, Japanese society commonly treats it more as a legitimate combat sport than a performance.

The term puroresu refers to both Japanese and foreign professional wrestling. For example, American promotions WWE and AEW are still referred to as puroresu in Japan. Japanese wrestling historian Fumi Saito noted, "Puroresu is completely Japanese-English, and in the U.S. the same word is used for both pro and amateur wrestling. It may be easier to understand if you think of wrestling in the U.S. as having the same nuance as 'sumo' in Japanese. You call both 'wrestling' even if it's competitive or professional wrestling." Both amateur sumo and professional sumo are considered "sumo" in the same sense, as they have the same rules for competitions, such as the nature of the sport and whether the winner wins or loses. Professional sumo has many elements that separate it from pure competition, such as wearing the chonmage hairstyle and the traditions involved in competing.

== Rules and structure ==
Puroresu has a variety of rules that differ greatly from wrestling in other countries. While there is no governing authority for puroresu, there is a general standard which has developed. Each promotion has its own variations, but all are similar enough to avoid confusion. Any convention described below is simply a standard, and may or may not correspond exactly with any given promotion's codified rules.

Matches are held between two or more sides ("corners"). Each corner may consist of one wrestler or a tag team of two or more. Most team matches are governed by tag team rules.

The match is won by scoring a fall, which is generally consistent with standard professional wrestling:

- Pinning an opponent's shoulders to the mat for the referee's count of three.
- Submission victory, which sees the wrestler either tap out or verbally submit to their opponent.
- Knockout, the failure to regain composure at the referee's command.
- Countout, the failure of a wrestler to re-enter the ring at the referee's command, which is determined by a count of 20 (some federations use 10 like other countries do, but Japanese wrestling most often uses 20).
- Disqualification, the act of one wrestler breaking the rules.
- Referee stoppage, when the official deems a participant unfit to continue (either as a planned ending or due to legitimate injury).

Additional rules govern how the outcome of the match is to take place. One such example would be the Universal Wrestling Federation, which does not allow pinfall victories in favor of submissions and knockouts; this is seen as an early influence of mixed martial arts, as some wrestlers broke away from traditional wrestling endings to matches in favor of legitimate outcomes. Another example is that most promotions disallow punches, so many wrestlers utilize open handed strikes and stiff forearms; this rule was also applied in the early stages of Pancrase.

== Styles ==
=== Strong style ===
New Japan Pro-Wrestling, headed by Antonio Inoki, used Inoki's "strong style" approach of wrestling as a combat sport, influenced strongly by the styles of catch wrestlers such as Lou Thesz, Karl Gotch, and Billy Robinson. Wrestlers incorporated kicks and strikes from martial arts disciplines, and a strong emphasis was placed on submission wrestling. Inoki became known for "different styles fights" which were predetermined matches against practitioners of various martial arts. This led to his legitimate fight against Muhammad Ali in 1976 that was watched by an estimated 1.4 billion people worldwide. Many of New Japan's wrestlers, including top stars such as Seiji Sakaguchi, Tatsumi Fujinami, Akira Maeda, Satoru Sayama, Yoshiaki Fujiwara, Nobuhiko Takada, Masakatsu Funaki, Masahiro Chono, Shinya Hashimoto, Riki Choshu, Minoru Suzuki, Shinsuke Nakamura, and Keiji Mutoh, came from a legitimate martial arts background. This style led to the development of shoot wrestling and the spin-off Universal Wrestling Federation. Sayama developed and founded Shooto, a pioneer mixed martial arts organization, in 1985. That same year, Sayama's student Caesar Takeshi founded Shootboxing. Sayama would also found Strong Style Pro-Wrestling on 2005. Funaki, Suzuki, and others would found Pancrase and hold their first event two months before UFC 1. Maeda founded Fighting Network Rings in 1991 as a shoot-style promotion, which began transitioning to legitimate MMA competition in 1995. Takada was a co-founder of Pride Fighting Championships and Rizin Fighting Federation.

=== King's Road ===
Ōdō (王道; "King's Road" or "Royal Road") is a style which originated in All Japan Pro Wrestling (AJPW) and is most closely associated with the Four Pillars of Heaven (四天王, Shitennō), the informal Western name for the 1990s AJPW wrestlers Toshiaki Kawada, Kenta Kobashi, Mitsuharu Misawa, and Akira Taue. However, matches involving these four have been also referred to in Japan as Shitennō puroresu (四天王プロレス). As opposed to strong style's European catch wrestling influences, ōdō opted for a more "narrative" style, derived from the American model of professional wrestling as physical storytelling. However, ōdō distinguished itself from American professional wrestling by largely eschewing many of its storytelling devices. Storylines and characters were virtually nonexistent, as all the storytelling in ōdō occurred through the matches themselves. Blading was also banned outright. Because Baba disliked submissions, they were also eschewed in favour of decisive pinfalls. In 2011, Japanese wrestling magazine G Spirits cited Misawa's Triple Crown Heavyweight Championship title defense against Kawada on 29 July 1993 as the first match in the Shitennō style, and the 1993 World's Strongest Tag Determination League final in which Misawa and Kobashi wrestled Kawada and Taue was referred to as the "completed form" of the style by Tokyo Sports in 2014. According to Kawada, ōdō matches placed a heavy emphasis on "fighting spirit" and were about "breaking the limit you set in the last". AJPW referee Kyohei Wada, who recounted that Baba told his talent "whatever you want to do, do it, and whatever you can show the people, show it", would later compare his job officiating these matches to "conducting a symphony".

This escalation eventually manifested through the use of dangerous maneuvers that focused on the head and neck, particularly during the finishing stretches of ōdō matches. The physical consequences of this style, or at least its use of unprotected head drops, has often been cited as the underlying reason for Misawa's death after an in-ring accident in 2009.

=== Other styles ===
Throughout the 1990s, three individual styles—shoot style, lucha libre, and hardcore—were the main divisions of independent promotions, but as a result of interpromoting it is not unusual to see all three styles on the same card.

== Joshi puroresu ==
Joshi puroresu (women's professional wrestling) is usually promoted by companies that specialize in female wrestling, rather than female divisions of promotions featuring all types of wrestlers as is the case in the U.S. (a major exception was FMW, a men's promotion which had a small women's division but even then depended on talent from women's federations to provide competition). However, joshi puroresu promotions usually have agreements with male puroresu promotions such that they recognize each other's championships as legitimate and may share cards.

All Japan Women's Pro-Wrestling was the dominant joshi organization from the 1970s to the 1990s. AJW's first major star was Mach Fumiake in 1974, followed by the tag team the Beauty Pair (Jackie Sato and Maki Ueda in 1975. The early 1980s saw the rise of Jaguar Yokota and Devil Masami, major stars of the second wave of renowned workers who took the place of the glamour-based "Beauty Pair" generation. That decade would later see the rise of the tag team the Crush Gals (Chigusa Nagayo and Lioness Asuka), who achieved a level of unprecedented mainstream success in Japan that was unheard of by any female wrestler in the history of professional wrestling. Their long feud with Dump Matsumoto and her Gokuaku Domei (Atrocious Alliance) faction would become extremely popular in Japan during the 1980s, with their televised matches resulting in some of the highest rated broadcasts in Japanese television and the promotion regularly selling out arenas.

In 1985, Japan's second women's wrestling promotion formed with Japan Women's Pro-Wrestling. The promotion ran its first show on 17 August 1986. It featured Jackie Sato returning from retirement and future stars such as Shinobu Kandori, Mayumi Ozaki, Cutie Suzuki, and Dynamite Kansai, who would go on to be top stars in LLPW and JWP. In 1992, Japan Women's Pro-Wrestling dissolved and split into LLPW and JWP. These promotions worked together with FMW and All Japan Women's Pro-Wrestling to create a critically acclaimed era with several classic matches covered by American wrestling publication Wrestling Observer Newsletter, featuring wrestlers such as Manami Toyota, Aja Kong, Kyoko Inoue, Bull Nakano, Mayumi Ozaki, Megumi Kudo, and Dynamite Kansai. This era was also notable for multiple wrestlers returning from retirement such as Chigusa Nagayo, Lioness Asuka, Jaguar Yokota, Devil Masami, and Bison Kimura.

New Japan Pro Wrestling inaugurated their own IWGP Women's Championship in 2022, and Pro Wrestling Noah followed with their GHC Women's Championship in 2024.

== See also ==
- Japanese martial arts
- Mixed martial arts
- Global Professional Wrestling Alliance
- List of professional wrestling promotions in Japan
