= Big Egg Wrestling Universe =

Professional wrestling event held by All Japan Women's Pro-Wrestling

- Promotion: All Japan Women's Pro-Wrestling
- Date: November 20, 1994
- City: Tokyo, Japan
- Venue: Tokyo Dome
- Attendance: 32,500

The Big Egg Wrestling Universe (known in Japan as Dōmu Chōjo Taisen (憧夢超女大戦)) was a professional wrestling event held by All Japan Women's Pro-Wrestling (AJW) inside the Tokyo Dome in Tokyo, Japan on November 20, 1994, and was attended by 32,500 fans. However, some sources claim the event was attended by over 42,000 fans. The event generated approximately $4 million in revenue from ticket sales, as well as $1.6 million in merchandise sales.

The event featured representatives from joshi promotions GAEA Japan (GAEA), JWP Joshi Puroresu (JWP), and Ladies Legend Pro-Wrestling (LLPW), as well as puroresu promotions Frontier Martial-Arts Wrestling (FMW), Michinoku Pro Wrestling (MPW) and American wrestling promotion World Wrestling Federation (WWF). In addition to female wrestlers, the event also featured matches with male midget wrestlers, female amateur wrestlers, female kickboxers, and female shootboxers.

== Event ==
=== Production ===
The event, which lasted ten hours, was promoted as the biggest card in the history of women's wrestling. It featured 23 matches of various styles. The opening ceremony of the event featured a 60-piece band that accompanied a parade of wrestlers that each carried a flag representing a different wrestling promotion. The main event matches featured elaborate entrances from the female performers. Approximately $1.1 million was spent on the special effects used throughout the event.

=== Results ===
No.	Results	Stipulations	Times
1	Chaparita Asari and Bomber Hikari defeated Hiromi Sugo and Hiroumi Yagi	Tag team match (GAEA vs. JWP)	6:53
2	Great Little Muta and Buta Genjin defeated Tsunokake X	Midget handicapd match	4:44
3	Candy Okutsu (c) defeated Rie Tamada	Singles match for the AJW Junior Championship	8:52
4	Suzuka Minami defeated Kaoru	Singles match (GAEA)	9:35
5	Kumiko Maekawa defeated Sugar Miyuki via judge's decision	Kickboxing match	10:00 (5 rounds)
6	Doris Blind defeated Kyoko Hamaguchi via points	Amateur wrestling match	4:00
7	Miyuu Yamamoto defeated Anna Gomis via points	Amateur wrestling match	4:00
8	Fumiko Ishimoto defeated Kaoru Ito	Shootboxing match	15:00 (5 rounds)
9	Chigusa Nagayo defeated Reggie Bennett	Singles match (GAEA)	8:39
10	Shinobu Kandori and Mikiko Futagami defeated Toshiyo Yamada and Tomoko Watanabe	Tag team match (LLPW)	11:30
11	Etsuko Mita and Mima Shimoda (c) defeated Yasha Kurenai and Michiko Nagashima	Tag team match for the UWA World Women's Tag Team Championship	15:36
12	Lioness Asuka and Yumi Ogura vs. Jaguar Yokota and Bison Kimura ended in a draw	Tag team match	10:00
13	Blizzard Yuki defeated Mariko Yoshida	Singles match	12:03
14	Combat Toyoda defeated Yumiko Hotta	V*TOP Five Star Tournament first round match	16:55
15	Akira Hokuto defeated Eagle Sawai	V*TOP Five Star Tournament first round match	11:08
16	Aja Kong defeated Manami Toyota	V*TOP Five Star Tournament first round match	17:19
17	Dynamite Kansai defeated Kyoko Inoue	V*TOP Five Star Tournament first round match	17:39
18	Megumi Kudo and Hikari Fukuoka defeated Cutie Suzuki and Takako Inoue	Tag team match (FMW vs. JWP)	14:04
19	The Great Sasuke, Sato, Shiryu defeated Super Delfin, Gran Naniwa, and Jinsei Shinzaki	Six-man tag team match (MPW)	21:45
20	Akira Hokuto defeated Combat Toyoda	V*TOP Five Star Tournament semi-final round match	5:48
21	Aja Kong defeated Dynamite Kansai	V*TOP Five Star Tournament semi-final round match	12:24
22	Bull Nakano defeated Alundra Blayze (c)	Singles match for the WWF Women's Championship (WWF)	9:27
23	Akira Hokuto defeated Aja Kong	V*TOP Five Star Tournament final round match	20:24
(c) / – the champion(s) heading into the match
