= Las Cachorras Orientales =

Professional wrestling tag team

Las Cachorras Orientales ラス・カチョーラス・オリエンタレス

Tag team
- Members: Etsuko Mita; Mima Shimoda
- Combined billed weight: Shimoda (63kg); Mita (75kg)
- Billed from: Japan
- Former members: Akira Hokuto
- Debut: 1992
- Disbanded: 2009
- Years active: 1992–2009

Las Cachorras Orientales (Japanese: ラス・カチョーラス・オリエンタレス), frequently styled as LCO, were a professional wrestling tag team composed of Etsuko Mita and Mima Shimoda. The team's name is Spanish for "The Oriental Bitches". The team was established in 1992 and participated in various prominent Japanese women's professional wrestling organizations, including All Japan Women's Pro-Wrestling, NEO Japan Ladies Pro-Wrestling, Gaea Japan, JWP Joshi Puroresu, and Arsion. Las Cachorras Orientales (Etsuko Mita and Mima Shimoda) held multiple prestigious tag team championships throughout their career, including the AJW Tag Team Championship, the JWP Tag Team Championship, the UWA World Women's Tag Team Championship, the Twin Star of Arsion Championship, and the WWWA World Tag Team Championship, which they won on four occasions.

They gained notoriety for their distinctive brawling style and use of painted steel chairs and guardrails as weapons against opponents during matches.

Las Cachorras Orientales are widely regarded as one of the greatest tag teams in Japanese women’s wrestling history due to their innovative style, championship success, and lasting impact on joshi puroresu.

== History ==
=== Dream Orca and The Tokyo Sweethearts ===
Etsuko Mita debuted on July 31, 1987, for All Japan Women's Pro-Wrestling against Chiaki Ishikawa. On August 5, 1987 Mima Shimoda debuted against Mita.

Prior to creating LCO, both Mita and Shimoda were in other tag teams. Mita was one half of "Dream Orca", along with Toshiyo Yamada. Shimoda was one half of the "Tokyo Sweethearts" along with Manami Toyota. The two teams met on August 10, 1988, and on May 6, 1989, at Wrestle Marinepiad '89 with the Tokyo Sweethearts winning.

On June 14, 1989, Mita captured the AJW Tag Team Championship with Toshiyo Yamada, but the team had to vacate the titles in March 1990 when Yamada was injured.

On November 14, 1990, at Wrestle Marinepiad '90, Mita and Shimoda, prior to becoming LCO captured the AJW Tag Team Championship from the "Honey Wings" of Mika Takahashi and Kaoru. The reign lasted until April 21, 1991, when they were defeated by Esther and Cynthia Moreno at AJW St. Battle Day Part 2. This was Mita and Shimoda's only AJW Tag Team Championship together.

Both Dream Orca and The Tokyo Sweethearts were broken up by 1991 with Mita forming the "Mint Showers" with Manami Toyota. During Tag League the Best 1991 in October 1991, Mita teamed with Toyota and Shimoda teamed up with Miori Kamiya, which both teams coming at the bottom of the standings. During August 1992, during the Fuji TV Mid Summer Typhoon Tag Tournament, Mita teamed up with Takako Inoue, while Shimoda continued to team with Toyota.

=== Las Cachorras Orientales ===
In 1992, Mita and Shimoda, along with Akira Hokuto, embarked on an excursion to Mexico, where Hokuto and Mita formed Las Cachorras Orientales; Shimoda officially joined the stable on July 15, 1992, after pleading with Hokuto during an All Japan Women’s Pro-Wrestling event. Mita and Shimoda turned heel, adopting a rougher style that included using steel chairs matching their ring attire colors and guardrails.

The team entered their first Tag League the Best during 1992, gaining 3 points in the tournament. The team appeared at All Japan Women's DREAM RUSH on November 26, 1992, defeating Miori Kamiya and Chikako Hasegawa.

The team was not featured much during 1993, mostly wrestling undercard and trios matches. On April 2, 1993, at All Japan Women's Dreamslam 2 event, LCO were defeated by the FMW team of Combat Toyoda and Megumi Kudo. The team entered Tag League the Best 1993, coming in second to last with 4 points. During this tournament, the team met their future rivals, Kaoru Ito and Tomoko Watanabe on December 10, 1993.

LCO had their biggest match to date on January 24, 1994, facing off against WWWA Tag Champions Manami Toyota and Toshiyo Yamada in a 2 out of 3 falls match.

=== Double Champions ===
At Wrestling Queendom 1994 on March 27, 1994, the team won the JWP Tag Team Championship by defeating Mayumi Ozaki and Cutie Suzuki. The team became double champions later on in the week when they captured the UWA World Women's Tag Team Championship from Yumiko Hotta and Takako Inoue on March 30, 1994. The team defended both titles successfully against Yumiko Hotta and Kaoru Ito on May 2, 1994, and then again on June 3, 1994, against the JWP team of Hikari Fukuoka and Candy Okutsu. At All Japan Women's Budokan Retsudan MAX on August 24, 1994, the team defended the UWA tag titles successfully against LLPW's Harley Saito and Jen Yukari.

LCO entered Tag League the Best 1994. They had their best showing to date in the tournament, finishing in 4th place and gaining 9 points.

On October 9, 1994, the team had another successful defense of the JWP Tag Titles when they defeated Command Bolshoi and Hikari Fukuoka. On November 20, 1994, at Big Egg Wrestling Universe at the Tokyo Dome, the team defended the UWA tag titles against their LLPW counterparts, Yasha Kurenai and Michiko Nagashima.

On December 23, 1994, for AJW Zeno Happy Battle Xmas!!, Mita teamed with former Dream Orca partner, Toshiyo Yamada, to fight Shimoda and her former Tokyo Sweethearts partner, Manami Toyota.

=== 1995-Fall 1997 ===
On January 8, 1995, at JWP Mega Stars '95, LCO lost the JWP Tag Titles when they were defeated by Hikari Fukuoka and Mayumi Ozaki.

At AJW "Wrestling Queendom Success 1995", on March 21, LCO competed in a tournament to crown new WWWA Tag Team Champions. They defeated the Mexican team of Lady Apache and La Felina in the first round, but were defeated by Blizzard Yuki and Manami Toyota in the second round. Late that week on March 26, the team defended their UWA Tag Titles against Suzuka Minami and Tomoko Watanabe.

On May 7, 1995, LCO competed in Suzuka Minami's retirement match, against Suzuka Minami and Yumiko Hotta.

At AJW Destiny on September 2, 1995, LCO defended their UWA titles successfully against legends Jaguar Yokota and Lioness Asuka. This ended up being their last defense of the titles as the titles were vacated and abandoned until 2001.

On November 18, 1995, at AJW Wrestle Marinepaid '95, LCO faced off against each other in a singles match with Shimoda getting the win. LCO did not team much together after this until June 1997 with Mita taking on a variety of partners and Shimoda reforming her Tokyo Sweethearts team with Manami Toyota.

On June 18, 1997, the team captured the WWWA World Tag Team Championship for the first time by defeating Tomoko Watanabe and Kumiko Maekawa, finally capturing the titles after 5 years as a team. The teams rematched on August 20, 1997, with LCO retaining the titles.

On September 21, 1997, LCO competed in an escape cage match against Kaoru Ito and Tomoko Watanabe. This was a highly regarded match with blood and weapons that featured a famous moment when Kaoru Ito did a double footstomp off the top of the cage to lead her team to victory.

On October 18, 1997, LCO defended their titles successfully against Kumiko Maekawa and Momoe Nakanishi. This was their last match in All Japan Women's for 1997.

=== NEO and other promotions ===
During 1997, All Japan Women's went bankrupt. This caused the promotion to lose 14 wrestlers, including LCO, who went with Kyoko Inoue to NEO Japan Ladies Pro-Wrestling. This changed the landscape of women's wrestling forever in Japan. Due to leaving All Japan Women's, the team vacated their WWWA Tag Titles on January 9, 1998.

Between October 1997 and February 1998, the team made stops in Ladies Legend Pro-Wrestling, JDStar and Gaea Japan while creating a rivalry with Kyoko Inoue and Misae Genki in NEO. The team also stopped in JWP later that year.

The team became freelance in 1999. They wrestled multiple matches for Gaea Japan eventually joining the heel faction, SSU(Super Star Unit). They also started to appear in Arsion during Summer 1999, winning the Twin Stars of Arsion League in December 1999. They also returned to All Japan Women's during this time, capturing the WWWA Tag Titles on July 10, 1999. The team feuded with Tomoko Watanabe and Kumiko Maekawa throughout 1999, which lead to a cage match on March 4, 2000.

LCO captured the Twin Star of Arsion Championship on December 3, 2000. The same month, they finally won Tag League the Best 2000, on their fourth try as a team.

LCO recaptured the WWWA Tag Titles on January 4, 2001, defeating Nanae Takahashi and Momoe Nakanishi. LCO captured the WWWA Tag Titles again from then on November 29, 2002, becoming champs for the 4th and final time.

In 2005, Mita joined NEO full-time. On November 1, 2009, LCO teamed for the final time as Mita retired. They teamed against Kyoko Inoue and Nanae Takahashi.

== Championships and accomplishments ==
- All Japan Women's Pro-Wrestling
  - AJW Tag Team Championship (1 time)
  - WWWA World Tag Team Championship (4 times)
  - Tag League The Best (2000)
- JWP Joshi Puroresu
  - JWP Tag Team Championship (1 time)
- Universal Wrestling Association
  - UWA World Women's Tag Team Championship (2 times)
- Arsion
  - Twin Star of Arsion Championship (1 time)
