= Winona Littleheart =

American professional wrestler (1955–2020)

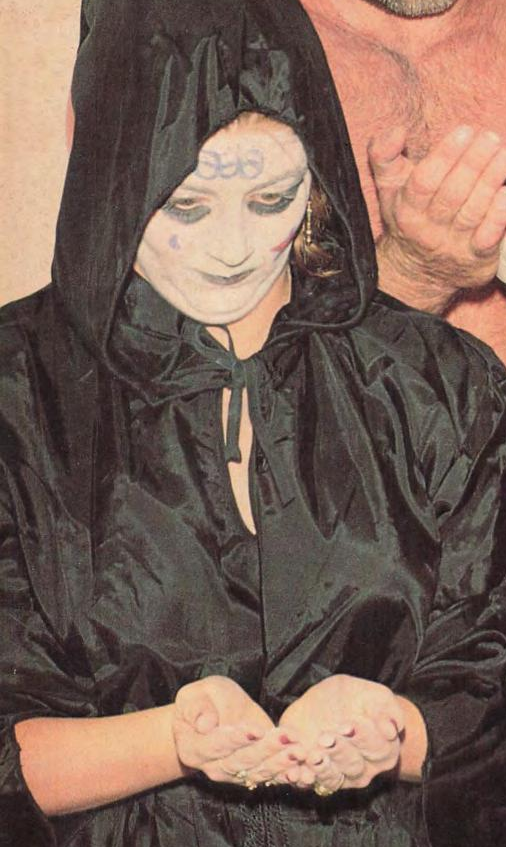
- Littleheart as "The Lock", c. 1985

Personal information
- Born: Winfred Childree; September 5, 1955 Reynolds, Georgia, U.S.
- Died: May 9, 2020 (aged 64)
- Spouse: Mark Morrell
- Children: 1
- Family: Dick Barkley (stepfather); Peggy Lee Leather (stepsister)

Professional wrestling career
- Ring name(s): Cindy Lou; The Lock; Miss Littleheart; Princess Littleheart; Wenona Littleheart; Winona Littleheart; Winnie Barkley
- Trained by: The Fabulous Moolah; Joyce Grable; Sue Green
- Debut: January 1, 1976
- Retired: 1988

Winfred "Winnie" Childree, also known as Winfred Barkley (September 5, 1955 – May 9, 2020) was an American professional wrestler, better known by the ring names Winona Littleheart and The Lock.

== Professional wrestling career ==
=== National Wrestling Alliance (1976–1985) ===
Childree, stepdaughter of wrestler/booker "Dirty" Dick Barkley, debuted on New Year's Day, 1976, participating in a ten-woman battle royal at the Omni Coliseum in Atlanta, Georgia. She began her wrestling career as "Winona Littleheart" with the standard "Native American" gimmick, including a fringe vest and feather in her hair. She became Girls' Wrestling Rookie of the Year for 1976. For the next several years, she would cut her teeth in various NWA territories such as Tampa, New York, Amarillo, Hawaii, Mid-South, Mid-Atlantic, Midwest, Houston, St. Louis, Nashville, Atlanta, Knoxville, Dallas, Kansas City, Calgary, and Memphis. As "Princess Little Heart", she was awarded the NWA United States Women's Championship in October 1980, before losing to the title to Judy Martin.

After leaving Moolah's group and the WWF in 1985, Childree returned to the NWA and its Tampa territory, this time under the name "Cindy Lou", a young woman who used to be friends with Barry Windham and Kendall Windham while growing up. She had been abducted by Kevin Sullivan, who renamed her "The Lock" (because he kept her under lock and key). As The Lock, she eventually wore a mohawk and wore bizarre clothing and face paint. She joined Sullivan's "Army of Darkness" stable and frequently fought with Sullivan's other valet, Fallen Angel. Eventually Luna Vachon joined the stable and she formed a tag team with The Lock known as "The Daughters of Darkness".

=== World Wrestling Federation (1977–1980, 1984–1985) ===
As Winona Littleheart, she frequently competed in the World Wide/World Wrestling Federation in the late 1970s and early/mid 1980s. She often feuded with The Fabulous Moolah and Judy Martin. She also worked as a trainer at Moolah's wrestling school and helped train Wendi Richter.

In 1985, two years after WWF finally broke away from the NWA, she challenged then WWF Women's Champion Leilani Kai for the title during Kai's short title reign.

=== Independent circuit (1985–1988) ===
As the Florida territory started to wind down, Luna and Lock hit the independent circuit and won the World Tag Team title for the short lived Women's Championship Wrestling (based in Las Vegas, the predecessor to LPWA). They defended the titles against Candi Devine and Debbie Combs in Memphis in January 1987. Later that summer, she returned to Georgia to compete for AWA Georgia.

The Lock wrestled for David McLane's Powerful Women of Wrestling in 1988, managed by Genie Beret.

== Retirement ==
Barkley retired from professional wrestling. She provided back-up vocals for a song on Nasty Savage's 1987 album "Indulgence".

She died on May 9, 2020. She was believed to have been 64 years old.

== Championships and accomplishments ==
- National Wrestling Alliance
  - NWA United States Women's Championship (1 time)
- Women's Championship Wrestling
  - WCW World Women's Tag Team Championship (1 time) – with Luna Vachon
