= All Pacific Championship =

Professional wrestling women's championship

- The All Pacific Championship belt

Details
- Promotion: All Japan Women's Pro-Wrestling
- Date established: August 31, 1977
- Date retired: April 2005

Other name
- Hawaiian Pacific Championship
Statistics
- First champion: Jane O'Brien
- Final champion: Lioness Asuka
- Most reigns: Kumiko Maekawa; Kyoko Inoue; Suzuka Minami; Tomoko Watanabe/Zap T (4 reigns)
- Longest reign: Chigusa Nagayo (740 days)
- Shortest reign: Lioness Asuka; Suzuka Minami (<1 day)

The All Pacific Championship was the secondary singles women's professional wrestling title in All Japan Women's Pro-Wrestling or AJW. The belt was started as the Hawaiian Pacific Championship in 1977 and was renamed the All Pacific Championship in 1978.

== Title history ==
Name	Years
Hawaiian Pacific Championship	August 31, 1977 – September 1, 1977
All Pacific Championship	September 1, 1977 – April 2005

Key
No.	Overall reign number
Reign	Reign number for the specific champion
Days	Number of days held

No.	Champion	Championship change			Reign statistics		Notes	Ref.
No.	Champion	Date	Event	Location	Reign	Days	Notes	Ref.
1	Jane O'Brien	August 31, 1977	Live Event	Honolulu, HI	1	1	O'Brien defeated Maki Ueda to become the inaugural Hawaiian Pacific champion.	
2	Yumi Ikeshita	September 1, 1977	Live Event	Honolulu, HI	1	122 – 261	The title is renamed the All Pacific Championship during this reign; Ikeshita was recognized by AJW as first All Pacific Champion.	
—	Vacated	1978	—	—	—	—	The championship was vacated after Yumi Ikeshita suffered an ankle injury.	
3	Chabela Romero	May 20, 1978	Live Event	Ōmiya-ku, Saitama, Japan	1	81	Romero defeated Maki Ueda to win the vacant championship.	
4	Maki Ueda	August 9, 1978	Live Event	Tokyo, Japan	1	202		
—	Vacated	February 27, 1979	—	—	—	—	Maki Ueda vacated the championship to pursue the WWWA World Single Championship.	
5	Tomi Aoyama	September 27, 1979	Live Event	Osaka, Japan	1	65	Aoyama defeated Leilani Kai to win the vacant championship.	
—	Vacated	December 1, 1979	—	—	—	—	The championship was vacated after Tomi Aoyama suffered a knee injury.	
6	Yumi Ikeshita	February 21, 1980	Live Event	Nagoya, Aichi, Japan	2	370	Ikeshita defeated Lucy Kayama to win the vacant championship.	
7	Mimi Hagiwara	February 25, 1981	Live Event	Yokohama, Kanagawa, Japan	1	185		
—	Vacated	August 29, 1981	—	—	—	—	Mimi Hagiwara vacated the championship to pursue the WWWA World Single Championship.	
8	Jumbo Hori	January 12, 1982	Live Event	Chiba, Japan	1	154	Hori defeated Wild Kazuki to win the vacant championship.	
—	Vacated	June 15, 1982	—	—	—	—	Jumbo Hori vacated the championship to pursue the WWWA World Tag Team Championship.	
9	Judy Martin	October 5, 1982	Live Event	Osaka, Japan	1	30	Martin defeated Yukari Omori to win the vacant championship.	
10	Mimi Hagiwara	November 4, 1982	Live Event	Himeji, Hyōgo, Japan	2	387		
—	Vacated	November 26, 1983	—	—	—	—	The championship was vacated after Mimi Hagiwara retired from wrestling.	
11	Devil Masami	April 1, 1984	Live Event	Tokyo, Japan	1	620	Masami defeated Judy Martin to win the vacant championship.	
—	Vacated	December 12, 1985	—	—	—	—	Devil Masami vacated the championship to pursue the WWWA World Single Championship.	
12	Chigusa Nagayo	April 5, 1986	Live Event	Tokyo, Japan	1	138	Nagayo defeated Dump Matsumoto to win the vacant championship.	
13	Leilani Kai	August 21, 1986	Live Event	Tokyo, Japan	1	249		
14	Chigusa Nagayo	April 27, 1987	Live Event	Osaka, Japan	2	740		
—	Vacated	May 6, 1989	—	—	—	—	The championship was vacated after Chigusa Nagayo retired from wrestling.	
15	Bull Nakano	June 18, 1989	Live Event	Tokyo, Japan	1	148	Nakano defeated Mitsuko Nishiwaki to win the vacant championship.	
16	Noriyo Tateno	November 13, 1989	Live Event	Ashikaga, Tochigi, Japan	1	168		
17	Aja Kong	April 30, 1990	Live Event	Chiba, Japan	1	48		
18	Suzuka Minami	June 17, 1990	Live Event	Tokyo, Japan	1	<1		
—	Vacated	June 17, 1990	Live Event	Tokyo, Japan	—	—	The championship was when Suzuka Minami refuses the title due to winning by disqualification.	
19	Manami Toyota	October 7, 1990	Live Event	Tokyo, Japan	1	161	Toyota defeated Bison Kimura in tournament final to win the vacant championship.	
20	Suzuka Minami	March 17, 1991	Live Event	Tokyo, Japan	2	43		
21	Akira Hokuto	April 29, 1991	Live Event	Tokyo, Japan	1	158		
22	Suzuka Minami	October 4, 1991	Live Event	Tokyo, Japan	3	22		
23	Bison Kimura	October 26, 1991	Live Event	Toyama, Japan	1	223		
24	Kyoko Inoue	June 5, 1992	Live Event	Asahikawa, Hokkaido, Japan	1	174		
25	Akira Hokuto	November 26, 1992	Dream Rush in Kawasaki	Kawasaki, Kanagawa, Japan	2	248 – 278		
—	Vacated	August 1993	—	—	—	—	The championship was vacated after Akira Hokuto suffered an injury.	
26	Toshiyo Yamada	November 28, 1993	Wrestling Queendom	Osaka, Japan	1	119	Yamada defeated Manami Toyota to win the vacant championship.	
27	Kyoko Inoue	March 27, 1994	Wrestling Queendom	Yokohama, Kanagawa, Japan	2	150		
28	Manami Toyota	August 24, 1994	Live Event	Tokyo, Japan	2	214	This match was also for Toyota's IWA World Women's Championship.	
—	Vacated	March 26, 1995	—	—	—	—	The championship was vacated for unknown reasons.	
29	Toshiyo Yamada	March 26, 1995	Wrestling Queendom Victory	Yokohama, Kanagawa, Japan	2	182	Yamada defeated Reggie Bennett and Takako Inoue in the triangular tournament to win the vacant championship.	
30	Yumiko Hotta	September 24, 1995	Innocent Stars in Kawasaki	Kawasaki, Kanagawa, Japan	1	99 – 272		
—	Vacated	April 1996	—	—	—	—	Yumiko Hotta vacated the championship in the Spring of 1996, in order to pursue the WWWA World Single Championship.	
31	Reggie Bennett	June 22, 1996	Champions Night in Sapporo	Sapporo, Hokkaido, Japan	1	152	Bennett defeated Kaoru Ito in a tournament final to win the vacant championship.	
32	Takako Inoue	November 21, 1996	Tag League the Best - Day 31	Kobe, Hyōgo, Japan	1	60	Already possessed the IWA World Women's Championship.	
33	Kyoko Inoue	January 20, 1997	"Ota Ward Champion Legend 1997" Zenjo Perfection - Day 13	Kobe, Hyōgo, Japan	3	111	Already possessed the WWWA World Single Championship. Unifies WWWA, IWA, and All Pacific Championships.	
—	Vacated	May 11, 1997	Zenjo Transformation - Day 8	Nagoya, Aichi, Japan	—	—	The championship was vacated due to dissatisfaction with 60-minute draw against Kaoru Ito.	
34	Takako Inoue	June 18, 1997	Zenjo Transformation - Day 36	Sapporo, Hokkaido, Japan	2	13 – 43	Inoue defeated Toshiyo Yamada to win the vacant championship.	
—	Vacated	July 1997	—	—	—	—	The championship was vacated after Takako Inoue suffered an injury.	
35	Tomoko Watanabe	August 22, 1997	Osaka Queen Holy Night	Osaka, Japan	1	133	Watanabe defeated Kaoru Ito to win the vacant championship.	
36	Takako Inoue	January 2, 1998	New Year Zenjo "VOW" - Day 1	Tokyo, Japan	3	109		
37	Zap T	April 21, 1998	Zenjo "RAN" - Day 7	Osaka, Japan	2	14	Formerly known as Tomoko Watanabe	
38	Kumiko Maekawa	May 5, 1998	Zenjo "RAN" - Day 17	Tokyo, Japan	1	208		
39	Yasha Kurenai	November 29, 1998	30th Anniversary Show	Yokohama, Kanagawa, Japan	1	89		
40	Kumiko Maekawa	February 26, 1999	LLPW Live event	Tokyo, Japan	2	350		
41	Azumi Hyūga	February 11, 2000	Live event	Tokyo, Japan	1	155		
42	Tomoko Watanabe	July 15, 2000	Odaiba W Explosion	Tokyo, Japan	3	428	Formerly known as Zap T.	
43	Kumiko Maekawa	September 16, 2001	N/A	Tokyo, Japan	3	38		
—	Vacated	October 24, 2001	—	—	—	—	Kumiko Maekawa vacated the championship after a title defense against Momoe Nakanishi.	
44	Momoe Nakanishi	February 24, 2002	Zenjo Turbulence	Yokohama, Kanagawa, Japan	1	196	Nakanishi defeated Kumiko Maekawa to win the vacant championship.	
—	Vacated	September 8, 2002	—	—	—	—	Momoe Nakanishi vacated the championship to pursue the WWWA World Single Championship.	
45	noki-A	October 20, 2002	Tag League the Best - Tag 2 Real All-Womanism Dream Explosion: Kawasaki Part 1	Kawasaki, Kanagawa, Japan	1	63	noki-A defeated Kayo Noumi in tournament final to win the vacant championship.	
46	Kayo Noumi	December 22, 2002	Real All-Womanism Dream Explosion: Kawasaki Part 2	Kawasaki, Kanagawa, Japan	1	483		
—	Vacated	April 18, 2004	—	—	—	—	The championship was vacated after Kayo Noumi retired from wrestling.	
47	Mika Nishio	July 18, 2004	Rising Generation - Day 12	Tokyo, Japan	1	112		
48	Hikaru	November 7, 2004	Rising Generation - Day 12	Tokyo, Japan	1	105		
49	Lioness Asuka	February 20, 2005	Lioness Asuka Produce: Dream Comes Living Legend	Tokyo, Japan	1	<1		
—	Vacated	February 20, 2005	—	—	—	—	The championship was vacated immediately after Lioness Asuka won the championship due to injury.	
—	Deactivated	April 2005	—	—	—	—	The championship retired when AJW closed.	

== Combined reigns ==
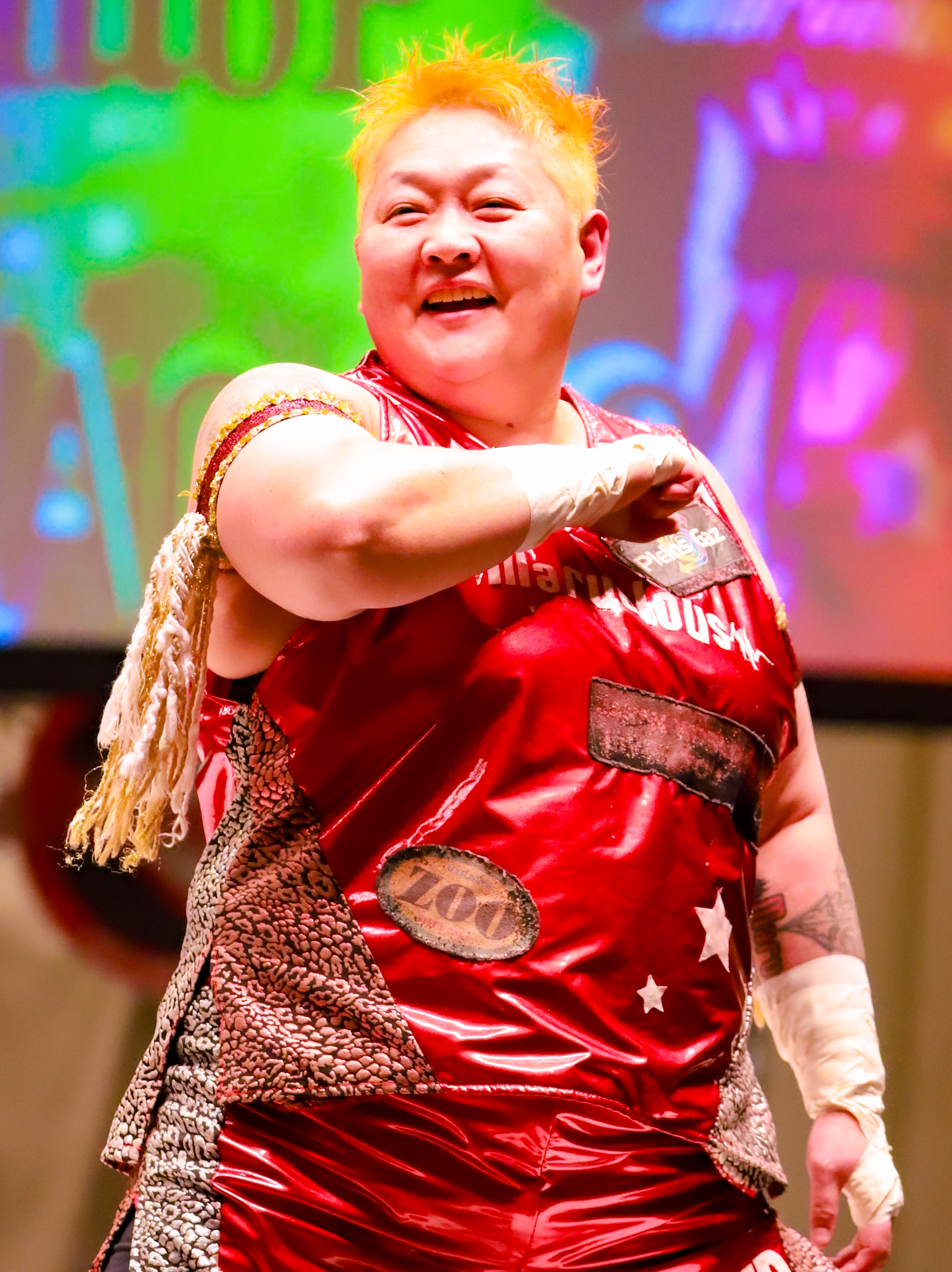
Two-time and record longest reigning champion Chigusa Nagayo

¤	The exact length of a title reign is uncertain; the combined length may not be correct.

Rank	Wrestler	No. of Reigns	Combined Days
1	Chigusa Nagayo	2	878
2	Devil Masami	1	620
3	Kumiko Maekawa	3	596
4	Tomoko Watanabe/Zap T	3	575
5	Mimi Hagiwara	2	572
6	Yumi Ikeshita	2	492 – 631¤
7	Kayo Noumi	1	483
8	Kyoko Inoue	3	435
9	Akira Hokuto	2	406 – 436¤
10	Manami Toyota	2	375
11	Toshiyo Yamada	2	301
12	Leilani Kai	1	249
13	Bison Kimura	1	223
14	Maki Ueda	1	202
15	Momoe Nakanishi	1	196
16	Takako Inoue	2	182 – 212¤
17	Noriyo Tateno	1	168
18	Azumi Hyūga	1	155
19	Jumbo Hori	1	154
20	Reggie Bennett	1	152
21	Bull Nakano	1	148
22	Mika Nishio	1	112
23	Hikaru	1	105
24	Yumiko Hotta	1	99 – 272¤
25	Yasha Kurenai	1	89
26	Chabela Romero	1	81
27	Suzuka Minami	3	65
27	Tomi Aoyama	1	65
29	noki-A	1	63
30	Aja Kong	1	48
31	Judy Martin	1	30
32	Jane O'Brien	1	1
33	Lioness Asuka	1	<1

== See also ==
- List of professional wrestling promotions in Japan
- List of women's wrestling promotions
- Professional wrestling in Japan
