= Sandy Parker =

Canadian professional wrestler (1944–2022)

Personal information
- Born: November 1, 1944 Vancouver, British Columbia, Canada
- Died: June 2022 (aged 77) Las Vegas, Nevada, U.S.

Professional wrestling career
- Ring name: Sandy Parker
- Billed height: 5 ft 2 in (1.57 m)
- Trained by: Lou Klein; Mary Jane Mull; Lucille Dupree; The Fabulous Moolah
- Debut: 1969
- Retired: 1986

Sandy Parker (November 1, 1944 – June 2022) was a Canadian professional wrestler. She debuted in 1969, wrestling in Canada, the United States, and Japan. In Japan, she worked for All Japan Women's Pro-Wrestling, holding numerous titles, and she was the first Black woman to win the WWWA World Single Championship in 1973. She also had an unofficial NWA Women's World Tag Team Championship reign with partner Sue Green. Wrestling journalist and historian Dave Meltzer has categorised Parker as "one of the best women professional wrestlers of the early 1970s".

== Professional wrestling career ==
After attending a professional wrestling match, Parker became addicted to the sport. At first, she went to the matches several times every week. She then decided to try the profession at the suggestion of a friend. Although she lived in Ontario, she traveled to Michigan three times a week to train with Lou Klein, Mary Jane Mull, and Lucille Dupree. She officially debuted in the early 1970s at the age of 23. She later went to The Fabulous Moolah's training school in South Carolina for further training, but left when she began having problems with Moolah. After leaving the school, Parker worked for Mildred Burke.

Parker worked under her real name instead of a ring name, because she was once unable to cash a check when it was written for her under the wrestling name; she could not provide identification for it, so she vowed never to use a ring name again.

In the early 1970s, Parker formed a partnership with Sue Green, with whom she defeated Donna Christanello and Toni Rose in November 1971 for the NWA Women's World Tag Team Championship. They lost the title to Christanello and Rose in February 1972. The title change is unrecognized. In August of that year, Parker competed at the Superbowl of Wrestling, where she teamed with Debbie Johnson to take on Rose and Christanello, but they failed to defeat them for the championship.

She began a tour of Japan also in the early 1970s. In 1973, she held All Japan Women's Pro-Wrestling's WWWA World Single Championship for approximately two months. Between June of that year and July 1974, she also held the promotion's WWWA World Tag Team Championship eight times, twice with Masked Lee, twice with Jean Antoine, and four times with Betty Niccoli. It is possible, however, that only six of the tag title reigns are officially recognized.

Back in the United States in 1975, Parker wrestled against Antoine in the first women's wrestling match in the state of Oregon in 50 years. Parker retired in 1986. In 2004, she was honored by the Cauliflower Alley Club, a society of retired professional wrestlers.

She played the part of the lady wrestler "Battling Betty" in the episode "In the corner Jaimie Sommers" from the second season of the TV program The Bionic Woman starring Lindsay Wagner as Jaimie and Richard Anderson who played Jaimie's boss Oscar Goldman

== Personal life and death ==
Parker was raised by her grandmother, as her mom was unable to take care of her. As a child, she considered herself a "tomboy", participating in fights, baseball, and tree climbing. Parker was openly a lesbian, something which caused difficulty during her career. The Fabulous Moolah, in particular, objected to Park living openly as a lesbian. Parker was once married to a man. Parker worked as a bartender, store manager, and security guard after leaving the business.

Parker died in June 2022, at the age of 77. Her death was not made public until November 2024.

== Championships and accomplishments ==
- All Japan Women's Pro-Wrestling
  - WWWA World Single Championship (1 time)
  - WWWA World Tag Team Championship (8 times) – with Betty Niccoli (4), Jean Antoine (2) and Masked Lee (2)
- Cauliflower Alley Club
  - Ladies Wrestling (2004)
- National Wrestling Alliance
  - NWA United States Women's Championship (1 time)
  - NWA World Women's Tag Team Championship (1 time) – with Susan Green
- Other titles
  - California Women's Championship (1 time)
- Women's Wrestling Hall of Fame
  - Class of 2025
