= IWA World Women's Championship =

Professional wrestling women's championship

Details
- Promotion: Stampede Wrestling; All Japan Women's Pro-Wrestling
- Date established: December 1987
- Date retired: May 11, 1997
Statistics
- First champion: Monster Ripper
- Final champion: Kyoko Inoue
- Most reigns: Chigusa Nagayo, Madusa Miceli, Kyoko Inoue (3)

The IWA World Women's Championship was a major women's professional wrestling title in All Japan Women's Pro-Wrestling. It had its origins with Stampede Wrestling in Calgary, Alberta in 1987.

== Title history ==
Key
No.	Overall reign number
Reign	Reign number for the specific champion
Days	Number of days held

No.	Champion	Championship change			Reign statistics		Notes	Ref.
No.	Champion	Date	Event	Location	Reign	Days	Notes	Ref.
1	Monster Ripper	December 1987	House show	N/A	1	N/A	Recognized as champion in Stampede Wrestling; announced as having defeated Wendi Richter before coming to Calgary.	
2	Chigusa Nagayo	September 22, 1988	House show	Calgary, Alberta	1	104	Defeats Monster Ripper in tournament final to become inaugural champion.	
3	Madusa Miceli	January 4, 1989	House show	Tokyo, Japan	1	1		
4	Chigusa Nagayo	January 5, 1989	House show	Tokyo, Japan	2	121		
—	Vacated	May 6, 1989	House show	N/A	—	—	The championship was vacated when Chigusa Nagayo retired.	
5	Madusa Miceli	September 14, 1989	House show	Kumamoto, Japan	2	N/A	Defeated Beastie to win the vacant championship.	
—	Vacated	1991	House show	N/A	—	—	The championship was vacated for undocumented reasons.	
6	Kyoko Inoue	August 31, 1991	House show	Mita, Minato, Tokyo	1	238	Defeated Debbie Malenko to win the vacant championship.	
7	Manami Toyota	April 25, 1992	Wrestlemarinepiad	Yokohama, Japan	1	1,115		
8	Reggie Bennett	May 15, 1995	Zenjo Movement - Day 8	Niigata, Japan	1	203		
9	Takako Inoue	December 4, 1995	Monday Night Sensation	Tokyo, Japan	1	413	Unifies with All Pacific Championship, defeating Reggie Bennett on November 21, 1996 in Kobe.	
10	Kyoko Inoue	January 20, 1997	"Ota Ward Champion Legend 1997" Zenjo Perfection - Day 13	Tokyo, Japan	2	111		
—	Deactivated	May 11, 1997	House show	N/A	—	—	Inoue Was unsatisfied after a match against Kaoru Ito ends in a 60-minute time limit draw; title abandoned.	

== See also ==
- List of professional wrestling promotions in Japan
- List of women's wrestling promotions
- Professional wrestling in Japan
