= Betty Niccoli =

American professional wrestler

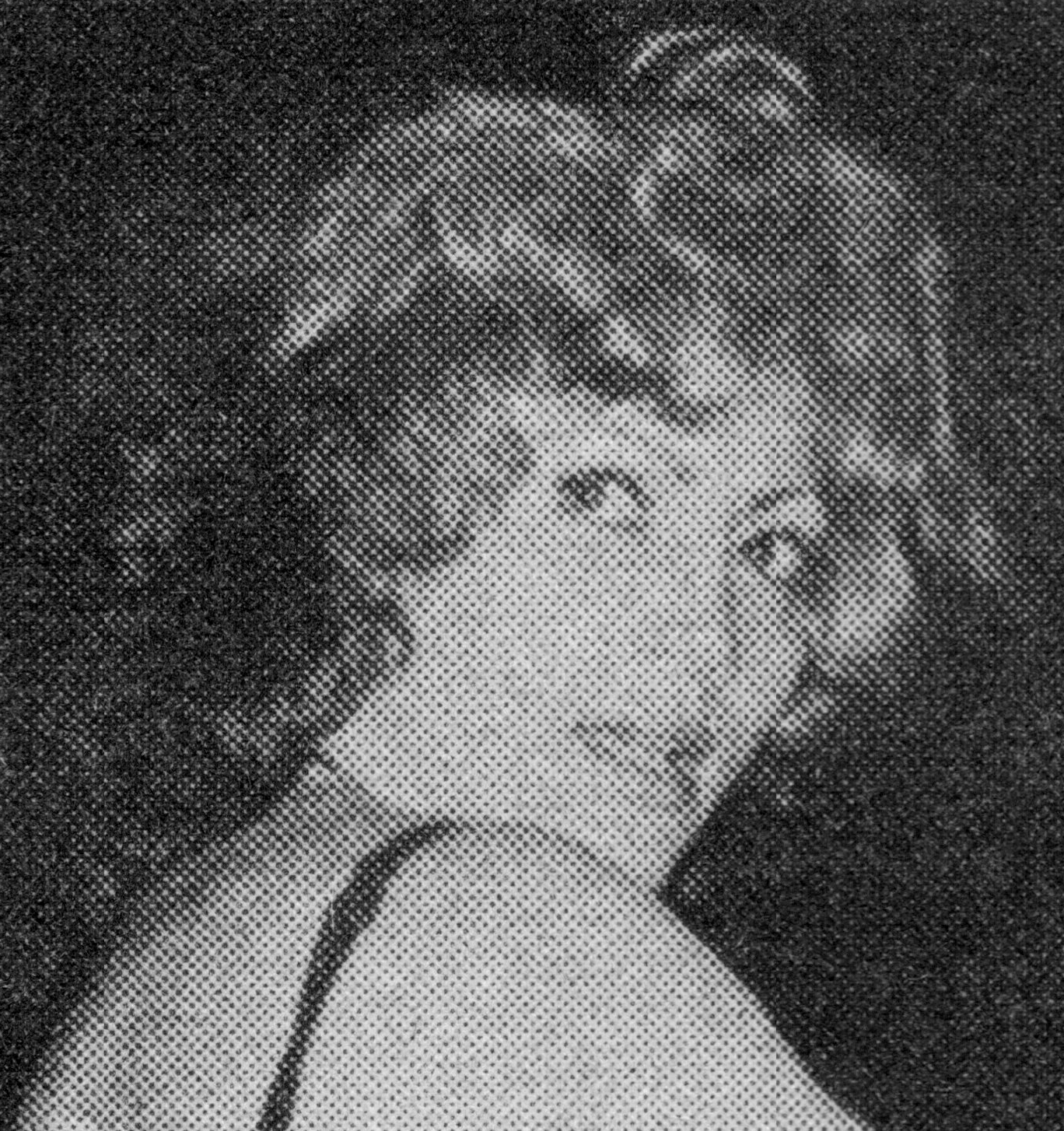

Personal information
- Born: Betty Jo Niccoli; October 9, 1943 (age 82) Kansas City, Missouri, U.S.
- Spouse: Akio Sato
- Children: 2

Professional wrestling career
- Ring name(s): Betty Nicoli; Betty Niccoli
- Debut: 1963
- Retired: 1976

Betty Jo Niccoli (born October 9, 1943) is an American former female professional wrestler. She wrestled in the United States, Canada, and Japan. She was also influential in helping lift the ban of women's wrestling in the state of New York.

== Professional wrestling career ==
Niccoli first saw a professional wrestling match at the age of 15 in St. Joseph, Missouri in 1958, when promoter Gust Karras suggested she might one day make a good female professional wrestler. Several years later in 1963, Karras arranged for her to start training. Her first match was a battle royal in Sedalia, Missouri.

She wrestled in a series of matches with and against Kay Noble in the 1960s. In August 1970, Niccoli was awarded the NWA United States Women's Championship, but she vacated it later that year, and the title remained inactive until December 1974. She teamed with Paul Peller in February 1971 for a series of mixed tag team matches against Jean Antone and Gil Hayes. Three years after holding the US Championship, in August 1973, she won the AWA World Women's Championship from Vivian Vachon in Canada. She held the title in November 1984, when Candi Devine defeated her for it. While still holding the AWA title, she spent three months in Japan in 1974, during which time she held All Japan Women's Pro-Wrestling's WWWA World Tag Team Championship four times with partner Sandy Parker. Back in the United States, she helped lift the ban on women's wrestling by the New York State Athletic Commission in the state of New York. Niccoli, however, never got a chance to wrestle in the state herself.

After retiring in 1976, Niccoli stayed out of the wrestling world until she visited a Cauliflower Alley Club (CAC) reunion in 2007. The following year, she was inducted into the Professional Wrestling Hall of Fame and Museum in the "Lady Wrestler" category. She was also honored by the CAC in 2008.

== Personal life ==
In the early 1970s, Niccoli met male professional wrestler Akio Sato, who was ten years her junior, during a mixed tag team match in Bob Geigel's promotion in the Central United States. The two married a year later, and in 1976, she retired from wrestling. The couple had two daughters, both of whom Niccoli stayed at home to raise. After her children were old enough to move out of the house, Niccoli began working at the Argosy Casino.

== Championships and accomplishments ==
- All Japan Women's Pro-Wrestling
  - WWWA World Tag Team Championship (4 times) – with Sandy Parker
- American Wrestling Association
  - AWA World Women's Championship (1 time)
- Cauliflower Alley Club
  - Ladies Wrestling Award (2008)
- National Wrestling Alliance
  - NWA United States Women's Championship (2 times)
- NWA Central States
  - NWA Central States Women's Championship (3 times)
- NWA Texas
  - NWA Texas Women's Championship (2 times)
- Professional Wrestling Hall of Fame and Museum
  - Lady Wrestler (2008)
- Stampede Wrestling
  - Stampede Wrestling North American Women's Championship (1 time)
- Other
  - Kansas Women's Championship (1 time)
