= NWA United States Women's Championship =

Professional wrestling women's championship

Details
- Promotion: National Wrestling Alliance
- Date established: 1957
- Date retired: 1988
Statistics
- First champion: Barbara Baker
- Final champion: Misty Blue Simmes

The NWA United States Women's Championship was a sporadically used women's professional wrestling championship in the National Wrestling Alliance from 1957 until 1988.

== Title history ==
Key
No.	Overall reign number
Reign	Reign number for the specific champion
Days	Number of days held

No.	Champion	Championship change			Reign statistics		Notes	Ref.
No.	Champion	Date	Event	Location	Reign	Days	Notes	Ref.
1	Barbara Baker	July 26, 1957 (nlt) (Note: Indicates that a title change took place "no later than" the date listed. Documentation of the specific date of a title change is not found but documentation of the champion holding the title on that date/in that period.)	N/A	N/A	1	(Note: The length of the reign is too uncertain to calculate.)	Baker was recognized in Illinois, Indiana, Iowa, Wisconsin and probably other states. Baker was still champion in Ogden, UT as of December 3, 1957.	
Championship history is unrecorded from December 3, 1957 to 1959.
2	Nell Stewart	July 7, 1959 (nlt)	N/A	N/A	1		Stewart claimed the championship in Knoxville, TN.	
Championship history is unrecorded from 1959 to 1961.
3	Judy Glover	September 24, 1961 (nlt)	Live Event	N/A	1	10 (Note: The exact date that Glover won the championship is uncertain, which means the length of this title reign might be inaccurate.)	According to The Honolulu Advertiser, Glover won an elimination tournament to win the championship.	
4	Kathy Starr	October 4, 1961	Live Event	Honolulu, HI	1		Starr was either remained the champion or won the title in Honolulu, HI as of July 18, 1965. Starr was also billed as American champion in San Bernardino, CA on April 16, 1966. Starr was also either remained the champion or won the title in Honolulu, HI on September 21, 1966 and August 10, 1967.	
Championship history is unrecorded from October 4, 1961 to May 1966.
5	Cora Combs	May 1966	Live Event	St. Louis, MO	1		Combs starts claiming the championship in Northern California from May 1965, billed as defeating Penny Banner for the title. Combs either remained the champion or won the title as of February 27, 1975 and March 1977. Combs had four reigns as the champion.	
Championship history is unrecorded from May 1965 to 1968.
6	Mae Young	July 7, 1968 (nlt)	N/A	N/A	1		Young was billed as the champion in the Gulf Coast territory.	
Championship history is unrecorded from before July 7, 1968 to July 19, 1968.
7	Jean Antone	July 19, 1968	N/A	Minneapolis, MN	1		According to The Sacramento Bee, Antone was recognized as the champion in Northern California by defeating Princess Little Cloud to win the title.	
Championship history is unrecorded from July 19, 1968 to 1970.
8	Betty Niccoli	July 22, 1970 (nlt)	N/A	N/A	1		Niccoli was billed as the champion in Midwest and West Texas.	
9	Jean Antone	October 1, 1973	Live Event	Green Bay, WI	2			
Championship history is unrecorded from October 1, 1973 to 1974.
10	Ann Casey	either in February 1974 or December 1974	Live Event	Liberty Hill, SC	1		Casey either defeated The Fabulous Moolah or Toni Rose to win the championship. Casey was billed as the champion in Boston, MA as of February 27, 1975. Casey was recognized in the Mid-America and Gulf Coast territories throughout the 70's. Casey retired as the champion in 92.	
11	Betty Niccoli	November 1, 1974 (nlt)	N/A	N/A	2		Niccoli either remained the champion or won the title as of January 1976. It is uncertain if Niccoli won the title before or after Ann Casey.	
Championship history is unrecorded from 1974 to 1976.
12	Sandy Parker	November 25, 1976 (nlt)	N/A	N/A	1		Parker was recognized as the champion in Northern California.	
Championship history is unrecorded from 1976 to December 1978.
13	Joyce Grable	December 1978	N/A	N/A	1		Grable was recognized as the champion in Amarillo, TX. Grable was also billed as the champion in Northern California as of May 8, 1981.	
14	Judy Martin	November 26, 1981	AWA Live Event	Saint Paul, MN	1	481		
15	Wendi Richter	March 22, 1983	CWF live Event	Tampa, FL	1			
Conflicted documented championship reigns
†	Princess Little Heart	October 5, 1980 (nlt)	—	—	1	48 (Note: The exact date that Heart won the championship is uncertain, which means the length of this title reign might be inaccurate.)	although Joyce Grable was the reigning champion at the time, Heart was recognized as the champion in Mobile, AL.	
†	Judy Martin	November 22, 1980	—	Atlanta, GA	2	813	although Joyce Grable was the reigning champion at the time, Martin was recognized as the champion after defeating then-champion Princess Little Heart.	
†	Velvet McIntyre	February 13, 1983	—	San Antonio, TX	1		Judy Martin was recognized as the champion after defeating Joyce Grable on November 26, 1981.	
Championship history is unrecorded from February 13, 1983 to before October 19, 1983.
16	Judy Martin	October 19, 1983 (nlt)	N/A	N/A	3		Martin was recognized as the champion in East Texas.	
Championship history is unrecorded from 1983 to before 1986.
17	Misty Blue Simmes	September 10, 1986 (nlt)	N/A	N/A	1		Records unclear as to whom Simmes defeated to win the championship. Simmes was still the champion as of January 30, 1988.	
—	Deactivated	N/A	—	—	—	—		

== See also ==
- List of National Wrestling Alliance championships
