= Kay Noble =

American professional wrestler

Personal information
- Born: Mary Charlene Noble; October 15, 1940 St. Joseph, Missouri, U.S.
- Died: April 27, 2006 (aged 65) Amarillo, Texas, U.S.

Professional wrestling career
- Ring name: Kay Noble
- Billed height: 5 ft 7 in (170 cm)
- Billed weight: 132 lb (60 kg)
- Trained by: Laura Martinez; Sonny Myers
- Debut: 1957
- Retired: 1987

Mary Charlene Noble (October 15, 1940 – April 27, 2006), known from childhood by her nickname Kay Noble, was an American professional wrestler. Her career spanned from the 1950s to the 1980s, during which time she was known for her toughness in the ring. She worked along well-known female professional wrestlers such as Penny Banner, The Fabulous Moolah, and Gladys Gillem. She also wrestled in mixed tag team matches with partners such as her husband Doug Gilbert and Terry Funk. During her almost thirty years wrestling, she held the Texas Women's Championship, Central States Women's Championship, and AWA World Women's Championship. She was also honored by the Cauliflower Alley Club in 2001, before dying of stomach cancer in April 2006.

== Professional wrestling career ==
Noble first wanted to become a professional wrestler at age 15 and wanted promoter Gust Karras to help her break into the business. She, however, did not begin her professional wrestling career until 1957 at the age 18 after being approached by a promoter in her hometown of St. Joseph, Missouri. She was trained by Laura Martinez and Sonny Myers. The following year in October 1958, Noble, along with Lorraine Johnson, Penny Banner, and Laura Martinez were charged with inciting a riot when they began fighting outside of the ring, but they pleaded not guilty in court. The promoters of the event paid the fine.

She later helped train male professional wrestler Colonel DeBeers. During her career, she held both the Texas Women's Championship and Central States Women's Championship. Throughout her years wrestling, Noble was known for her toughness and strength. She was also a high-flying wrestler.

In the 1960s, she worked primarily in Minneapolis, Minnesota. During this time, she wrestled a series of mixed tag team matches with her husband Doug Gilbert against Roy Collins and Barbara Baker. She also wrestled a series of matches against and teaming with Betty Niccoli. She also wrestled as the partner of Jack Cain in mixed tag team matches against Jean Antone and Terry Funk. Funk was also her partner on occasion. Her other well-known opponents included Penny Banner, The Fabulous Moolah, and Gladys Gillem. In 1963, she won the vacant AWA World Women's Championship by defeating Kathy Starr in Minnesota, and she held the title for approximately eight years, losing it to Vivian Vachon in November 1971 in Canada.

She was named WFIA's "Girl Wrestling of the Year" in 1971. By the 1980s, Noble only wrestled part-time while raising her children In 2001, the Cauliflower Alley Club, a society of retired professional wrestlers, honored her contributions to women's wrestling.

== Personal life ==
She once worked for Bob Geigel as a bartender in Kansas. After retiring from professional wrestling, Noble entered into the pest control and upholstery industries. Noble owned Kay's Upholstery in Amarillo, Texas. She later worked in pediatrics at Baptist St. Anthony's Hospital. In her spare time, she played the piano.

Noble was first married to Doug Gilbert (Doug Lindzy), whom she met in an elevator and married in 1959. The couple had three children: Teresa, Michael, and Steve. At this time they lived in North Branch, Minnesota where the children started school in ISD 138. later they bought a home in South Bend, Indiana, where they also owned horses. Her second marriage to Dean Fortune produced two sons, David and Danny. In November 1985, she married Dick Bell, to whom she was still married at the time of her death.

She died on April 27, 2006, in Amarillo, Texas, due to an inoperable stomach cancer, having been diagnosed the previous October. Her funeral was on May 1, 2006. At the time of her death, she also had 20 grandchildren and one great-grandchild.

== Championships and accomplishments ==
- American Wrestling Association
  - AWA World Women's Championship (1 time)
- Cauliflower Alley Club
  - Other honoree (2001)
- National Wrestling Alliance
  - National Women's Television Championship (1 time)
  - NWA World Women's Tag Team Championship (1 time) – with Lolita Martinez
- NWA Central States
  - NWA Central States Women's Championship (1 time)
- NWA Texas
  - NWA Texas Women's Championship (2 times)
- Professional Wrestling Hall of Fame and Museum
  - Lady Wrestler (Class of 2010)
- Wrestling Fans International Association
  - WFIA's Girl Wrestler of the Year (1971)
- Other
  - Kansas Women's Championship (1 time)
