= Jean Antone =

American professional wrestler (1943–2016)

Personal information
- Born: July 17, 1943 Laurel, Mississippi, U.S.
- Died: August 4, 2016 (aged 73) Forest, Mississippi, U.S.

Professional wrestling career
- Ring name(s): Jean Antone; Jean Antoine
- Billed height: 4 ft 11 in (1.50 m)
- Debut: 1961
- Retired: 1984

Jean Antone (July 17, 1943 – August 4, 2016) was an American professional wrestler. After debuting in 1961, she worked a series of mixed tag team matches with partner Terry Funk. In the early 1970s, she went to Japan to work for All Japan Women's Pro-Wrestling. While part of the company, she held the WWWA World Single Championship once and the WWWA World Tag Team Championship twice with partner Sandy Parker. Back in the United States, she wrestled in Oregon's first women's match in over 50 years in 1975.

== Professional wrestling career ==
Antone first decided to be a professional wrestler after watching a match at the age of 14. After high school, her mother offered to buy her a new car or pay for college. Antone refused both, instead wanting her mom to pay for her wrestling training in Florida. She debuted in 1961. In the 1960s, Antone wrestled in a series of mixed tag team matches with partner Terry Funk against Jack Cain and Kay Noble. She twice teamed with Gil Hayes in a mixed tag team match against Betty Niccoli and Paul Peller in early February 1971.

In the early 1970s, Antone competed in All Japan Women's Pro-Wrestling. In March 1972, she won the WWWA World Single Championship from Aiko Kyo, but lost it to Kyo six days later. She also held the WWWA World Tag Team Championship twice in 1974 with partner Sandy Parker. The duo first won the title on April 24 from the team of Junko Sasaki and Peggy Kuroda, but they re-lost the title to them during a rematch on May 21. Their second reign began on July 30 after defeating Mariko Akagi and Miyuki Yanagi. On August 5, however, Akagi and her new partner Jumbo Miyamoto defeated Antone and Parker for the title.

Back in the United States in 1975, Antone wrestled against Parker in the first women's wrestling match in the state of Oregon in 50 years.

She also wrestled in the Midwest, including at All-Star Wrestling. In the Midwest, she was the California, Kansas, and Central States Champion.

== Personal life ==
Antone married her high school sweetheart in a wrestling ring in Mississippi, as she had a wrestling match immediately afterward. They had a daughter in the early 1960s. The couple later divorced. Antone died on August 4, 2016, at the age of 73.

== Championships and accomplishments ==
- All Japan Women's Pro-Wrestling
  - WWWA World Single Championship (1 time)
  - WWWA World Tag Team Championship (2 times) – with Sandy Parker
- National Wrestling Alliance
  - NWA United States Women's Championship (2 times)
- NWA Central States
  - NWA Central States Women's Championship (3 times)
- Stampede Wrestling
  - Stampede Wrestling North American Women's Championship (1 time)
- Other titles
  - California and Kansas Championships
