= AWA World Women's Championship =

Professional wrestling women's championship

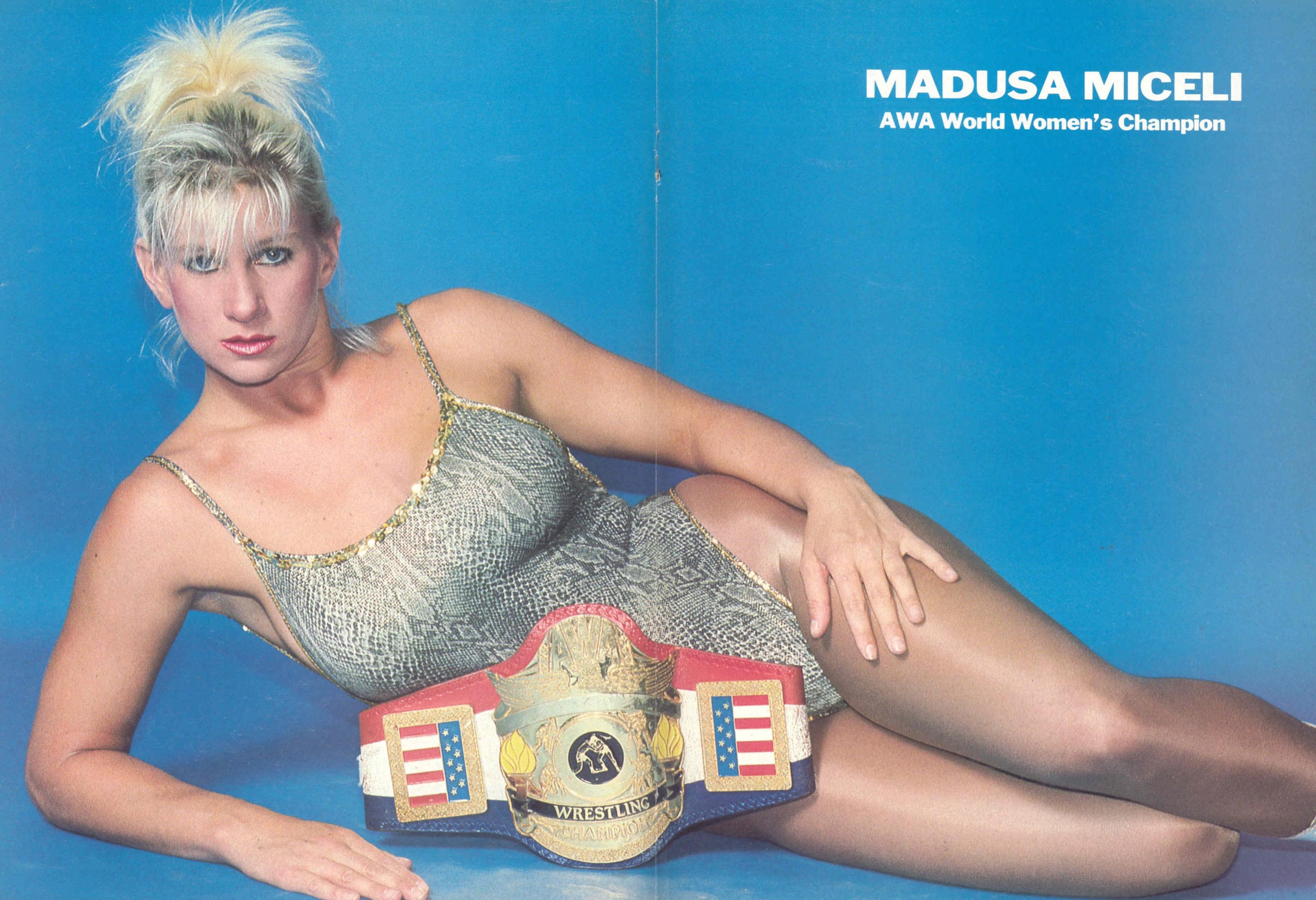
- Madusa Miceli posing with the championship in 1988

Details
- Promotion: American Wrestling Association (AWA)
- Date established: 1954
- Date retired: 1991
Statistics
- First champion: June Byers
- Most reigns: Candi Devine (4 times)
- Longest reign: Kay Noble (3,127 days)
- Shortest reign: Candi Devine (3 days)

The AWA World Women's Championship was the women's professional wrestling title in the American Wrestling Association (AWA) from 1961 until 1991.

== Title history ==
Key
No.	Overall reign number
Reign	Reign number for the specific champion
Days	Number of days held

No.	Champion	Championship change			Reign statistics		Notes	Ref.
No.	Champion	Date	Event	Location	Reign	Days	Notes	Ref.
1	June Byers	August 20, 1954	House show	Atlanta, GA	1	2563	Byers defeat Mildred Burke for the NWA World Women's Championship and continues to be recognized by AWA after it splits from NWA in 1960.	
2	Penny Banner	August 26, 1961	House show	Angola, IN	1	493	AWA ceased to recognize June Byers as women's champion after she no-showed a title defense. Banner won a battle royal to become the new AWA World Women's Champion.	
—	Vacated	January 1, 1963	—	—	—	—	The AWA vacated the championship on January 1, 1963, but June Byers continued to be recognized as champion by the NWA until she retired in January 1964.	
3	Kay Noble	April 13, 1963	House show	Saint Paul, MN	1	3127	Defeat Kathy Starr to win the vacant championship.	
4	Vivian Vachon	November 4, 1971	House show	Winnipeg, Manitoba	1	651		
5	Betty Nicoli	August 16, 1973	House show	Winnipeg, Manitoba	1	587		
—	Vacated	March 27, 1975	—	—	—	—	The championship was vacated when Betty Nicoli retired.	
Championship history is unrecorded from April 1975 to October 1984.
6	Candi Devine	November 2, 1984	House show	Minneapolis, MN	1	330	Devine won a battle royal to win the vacant championship.	
7	Sherri Martel	September 28, 1985	SuperClash	Chicago, IL	1	5		
—	Vacated	October 3, 1985	—	—	—	—	The championship was vacated for undocumented reasons.	
8	Candi Devine	October 14, 1985	House show	Memphis, TN	2	3	Devine was awarded the championship without title match.	
9	Sherri Martel	October 17, 1985	House show	Winnipeg, Manitoba	2	91		
10	Candi Devine	January 16, 1986	House show	Winnipeg, Manitoba	3	163		
11	Sherri Martel	June 28, 1986	Battle by the Bay	Oakland, CA	3	391		
—	Vacated	July 24, 1987	—	—	—	—	The championship was vacated when Sherri Martel went to the World Wrestling Federation (WWF).	
12	Madusa Miceli	December 27, 1987	AWA Championship Wrestling	Las Vegas, NV	1	335	Defeat Candi Devine to win the vacant championship.	
13	Wendi Richter	November 26, 1988	House show	Bloomington, MN	1	368		
—	Vacated	November 29, 1989	—	—	—	—	After Wendi Richter left the AWA.	
14	Candi Devine	December 6, 1989	House show	Toronto, Ontario, Canada	4	212	Defeat Judy Martin for the vacant title.	
—	Deactivated	August 1991	—	—	—	—	Title inactive when AWA close.	

== Combined reigns ==
¤	The exact length of a title reign is uncertain; the combined length may not be correct.

Rank	Wrestler	No. of reigns	Combined days
1	Kay Noble	1	3,127
2	June Byers	1	2,563
3	Candi Devine	4	708
4	Vivian Vachon	1	651
5	Betty Nicoli	1	587
6	Penny Banner	1	493
7	Sherri Martel	3	487
8	Wendi Richter	1	368
9	Madusa Miceli	1	335
