= Reggie Bennett =

American professional wrestler (born 1961)

Personal information
- Born: January 24, 1961 (age 65) San Diego, California, U.S.
- Spouse: Kenji Ishihara (m. 2000, divorced)

Professional wrestling career
- Ring names: Big Mo; Reggie Bennett
- Billed height: 5 ft 8 in (1.73 m)
- Billed weight: 249 lb (113 kg)
- Billed from: Venice Beach, California
- Debut: September 7, 1986
- Retired: March 4, 2001

Reggie Bennett (born January 24, 1961) is an American former professional wrestler. She is best known for her work in LPWA and in joshi puroresu organizations such as All Japan Women's Pro-Wrestling.

== Professional wrestling career ==
=== Early career (1986–1993) ===
Bennett began wrestling on the Californian independent circuit in 1986, primarily for the Independent Wrestling Federation, where she won the promotion's Women's Championship three times. Soon after, she was signed to the Ladies Professional Wrestling Association. Bennett participated in the LPWA Japan Title tournament during the February 23, 1992 pay-per-view LPWA Super Ladies Showdown, where she lost by disqualification in the semi-final round.

=== All Japan Women's Pro-Wrestling (1993–1996) ===
Bennett signed with All Japan Women's Pro-Wrestling in 1994 and competed there for several years. Bennett faced Chigusa Nagayo at the Big Egg Wrestling Universe show at the Tokyo Dome on November 20, 1994. She won the IWA World Women's Championship on May 15, 1995, defeating Manami Toyota. She lost the IWA Title later in 1995 to Takako Inoue. Bennett then went on to capture the All Pacific Championship by defeating Mariko Yoshida and then Kaoru Ito in a tournament on June 22, 1996, although she would again lose her title to Takako Inoue.

=== Extreme Championship Wrestling (1997) ===
On April 12, 1997, Bennett was one of the featured speakers at a banquet honoring Terry Funk. The following night at ECW Barely Legal, she debuted as a member of Raven's Nest, interfering with the World Heavyweight Championship match between Funk and Raven.

=== Arsion and retirement (1997–2001) ===
On November 14, 1997, Bennett joined Arsion, forming a villainous faction of American wrestlers with newcomer Jessica Soto, who was billed as Reggie's younger sister Jessica Bennett.

On March 4, 2001, Bennett wrestled her retirement match against Manami Toyota.

== Media ==
=== Filmography ===
- Spacehunter: Adventures in the Forbidden Zone (1983) as "Barracuda Leader"
- Vendetta (1986) as "Conchita"
- Over the Top (1987) as "Female arm wrestler"
- Muscle Rock Madness (1992) as herself
- Mask de 41 (2004) as "Subzero Bennet"

== Personal life ==
Bennett married a Japanese musician named Kenji Ishihara in August 2000.

== Championships and accomplishments ==
- All Japan Women's Pro-Wrestling
  - All Pacific Championship (1 time)
  - IWA World Women's Championship (1 time)
- Independent Wrestling Federation
  - IWF Women's Championship (3 times)

== Mixed martial arts record ==
Professional record breakdown
2 matches	1 win	1 loss
By knockout	0	0
By submission	1	1
By decision	0	0
By disqualification	0	0
Unknown	0	0
Draws	0	
No contests	0	

Res.	Record	Opponent	Method	Event	Date	Round	Time	Location	Notes
Loss	1-1	Irina Rodina	Submission (armbar)	UTT – Women's Vale Tudo Championship Finals	August 13, 1996	1	9:47	Tokyo, Japan	
Win	1-0	Irma Verhoeff	Submission (keylock)	UTT – Women's Vale Tudo Championship Opening Round	August 12, 1996	1	18:28	Tokyo, Japan	
