= Jackie Sato =

Japanese professional wrestler

Personal information
- Born: Naoko Sato; October 30, 1957 Yokohama, Kanagawa, Japan
- Died: August 9, 1999 (aged 41)

Professional wrestling career
- Ring name: Jackie Satō
- Billed height: 5 ft 8 in (173 cm)
- Debut: April 27, 1975
- Retired: March 20, 1988

Naoko Satō (佐藤尚子, Satō Naoko; October 30, 1957 – August 9, 1999), better known as Jackie Sato (ジャッキー佐藤, Jakkī Satō), was a Japanese professional wrestler. In the 1970s, while wrestling for All Japan Women's Pro-Wrestling (AJW), she formed the tag team, the Beauty Pair, with Maki Ueda. Following in the steps of Mach Fumiake, the Beauty Pair was part of an important shift in the culture of Japanese women's wrestling, attracting more female fans by becoming pop icons. In their mainstream success, Satō and Ueda led to the Crush Gals of the 1980s.

== Professional wrestling career ==
Sato became a professional wrestler after graduating from high school.

=== All Japan Women's Pro Wrestling (1975—1981) ===
Sato joined All Japan Women's Pro Wrestling (AJW) in 1975 and was part of the 1975 AJW rookie class alongside Maki Ueda and Yumi Ikeshita. She had her debut match against her future tag team partner, Maki Ueda, on April 27 of that year. On February 24, 1976, the Beauty Pair was formed, and they won the WWWA World Tag Team Championship that night. At the peak of the Beauty Pair's popularity, AJW achieved a television rating of over 20 percent.

Sato also had success as a singles wrestler. She won the WWWA World Single Championship on November 1, 1977, from Maki Ueda in a Beauty Pair showdown, and held it twice more during the late 1970s, defeating Monster Ripper and Nancy Kumi. She lost the title the final time to the younger Jaguar Yokota on February 25, 1981. On February 27, 1979, Sato defeated her former partner, Ueda, in a "loser retires" match. Satō's own retirement ceremony was held on May 21, 1981.

Sato attended the AJW thirtieth anniversary show in 1998.

=== Japan Women's Pro-Wrestling (1986—1988) ===
In 1986, inspired by the current boom in interest in women's wrestling in Japan due to the success of the Crush Gals, Sato, along with wrestler Nancy Kumi, boxer Rumi Kazama, and others, formed the first women's promotion to compete against the AJW monopoly, Japan Women's Pro-Wrestling (JWP). Satō returned from retirement on JWP's first show on August 17, 1986, in a match against Shinobu Kandori, in what was Kandori's debut. A year later, Sato was involved in an infamous incident on July 18, 1987, when a match involving her and Kandori turned into a shoot match. This incident led to her retiring for a second and final time on March 20, 1988. Under Sato's influence, JWP did not offer the "mandatory retirement" policy common in AJW, allowing female wrestlers to compete until they wished to retire, rather than until the promoters ordered them to retire.

== Personal life ==
Sato played basketball in high school. Sato died on August 9, 1999, due to stomach cancer.

== Championships and accomplishments ==
- All Japan Women's Pro-Wrestling

- WWWA World Single Championship (3 times)
- WWWA World Tag Team Championship (3 times) — with Maki Ueda (2) and Nancy Kumi (1)
- AJW Hall of Fame (1998)

- Tokyo Sports

- Service Award (1999)

- Wrestling Observer Newsletter

- Wrestling Observer Newsletter Hall of Fame (Class of 1996) – individually
- Wrestling Observer Newsletter Hall of Fame (Class of 2023) – with Maki Ueda

== See also ==
- List of premature professional wrestling deaths
