= Maki Ueda (wrestler) =

Japanese professional wrestler

Personal information
- Born: Makiko Ueda; March 8, 1959 (age 67) Tottori City, Japan

Professional wrestling career
- Billed height: 5 ft 6 in (168 cm)
- Trained by: All Japan Women's Pro-Wrestling
- Debut: March 19, 1975
- Retired: February 27, 1979

Makiko Ueda (上田 真基子, Ueda Makiko; March 8, 1959), better known as Maki Ueda (マキ上田, Maki Ueda), is a retired Japanese professional wrestler. In the 1970s, while wrestling for All Japan Women's Pro-Wrestling (AJW), she formed the tag team, the Beauty Pair, with Jackie Sato. Following in the steps of Mach Fumiake, the Beauty Pair was part of an important shift in the culture of Japanese women's wrestling, attracting more female fans by becoming pop icons. In their mainstream success, Satō and Ueda paved the way for the Crush Gals of the 1980s.

== Professional wrestling career ==
She dropped out of Tottori Prefectural Tottori Agricultural High School after one year and entered All Japan Women's Pro Wrestling, making her debut on March 19, 1975. A month later on April 27, she teamed up Jackie Sato, who would later become her partner in the Beauty Pair during Sato's professional wrestling debut.

They won the WWWA World Tag Team Championship on February 24, 1976, defeating the pair of Sylvia Hackney and Sonia Oriana. In addition, Beauty Pair sold 800,000 records as a singer with Kake Megure Seishun, and later became an idol figure with songs such as Crimson Youth, Bamba Bang, and I Don't Need Roses for Youth, the audience seats for their matches were always filled with female fans, and when they performed their songs in the ring before the match, the ring was filled with paper tape and confetti, making them extremely popular.

On June 8, 1976, she won the WWWA World Singles Championship from Jumbo Miyamoto in her hometown of Tottori. Although she lost the title to Mariko Akagi on November 30, she regained it from Akagi the following year on July 29, 1977. On November 1, Jackie Sato will challenge Maki for the WWWA World Singles Championship. This match was attracting attention as a showdown between a pair of beauties, and both sides lost the title by decision after the 60-minute time limit expired.

On August 9, 1978, she won the Hawaiian Pacific Championship (later renamed the All-Pacific Championship) from Chabela Romero. This made her the first female wrestler to win all three major WWWA titles (WWWA World Singles Championship, WWWA World Tag Team Championship, and All-Pacific Championship).

At the Nippon Budokan tournament on February 27, 1979, she faced off against Jackie again under the harsh rule of "loser retires," but was defeated in 48 minutes and 7 seconds and retired. The All-Pacific title was relinquished, and the Beauty Pair came to an end. Maki Ueda was 19 years old at the time.

This match took place when Maki approached Matsunaga, the president of All Japan Women's Pro Wrestling at the time, about her retirement and disbanding the Beauty Pair, and he said, The one who fights and loses will retire. Maki had no intention of winning from the beginning. Meanwhile, Jackie was completely unaware of the match until it was announced on January 4, two months earlier.

== Personal life ==
After her retirement, she worked as an actress for a period of time and made her debut as a guest star on The Super Girl (Tokyo Channel 12), and then appeared in the special effects hero program Battle Fever J, an early entry in the Super Sentai series. Appeared in the role of Salome, a villainous female executive. She has also released the single record "Invader WALK" as a singer.

In 2024, Netflix released a Japanese series, Queens of Villains, which features Ueda. The character is voiced by WWE's Alexa Bliss in the English dub.

== Championships and accomplishments ==
- All Japan Women's Pro-Wrestling

- WWWA World Single Championship (1 time)
- WWWA World Tag Team Championship (2 times) — with Jackie Sato (2)
- All Pacific Championship (1 time)
- AJW Hall of Fame (1998)

- Wrestling Observer Newsletter

- Wrestling Observer Newsletter Hall of Fame (Class of 2023) – with Jackie Sato
