= Sue Green =

American professional wrestler

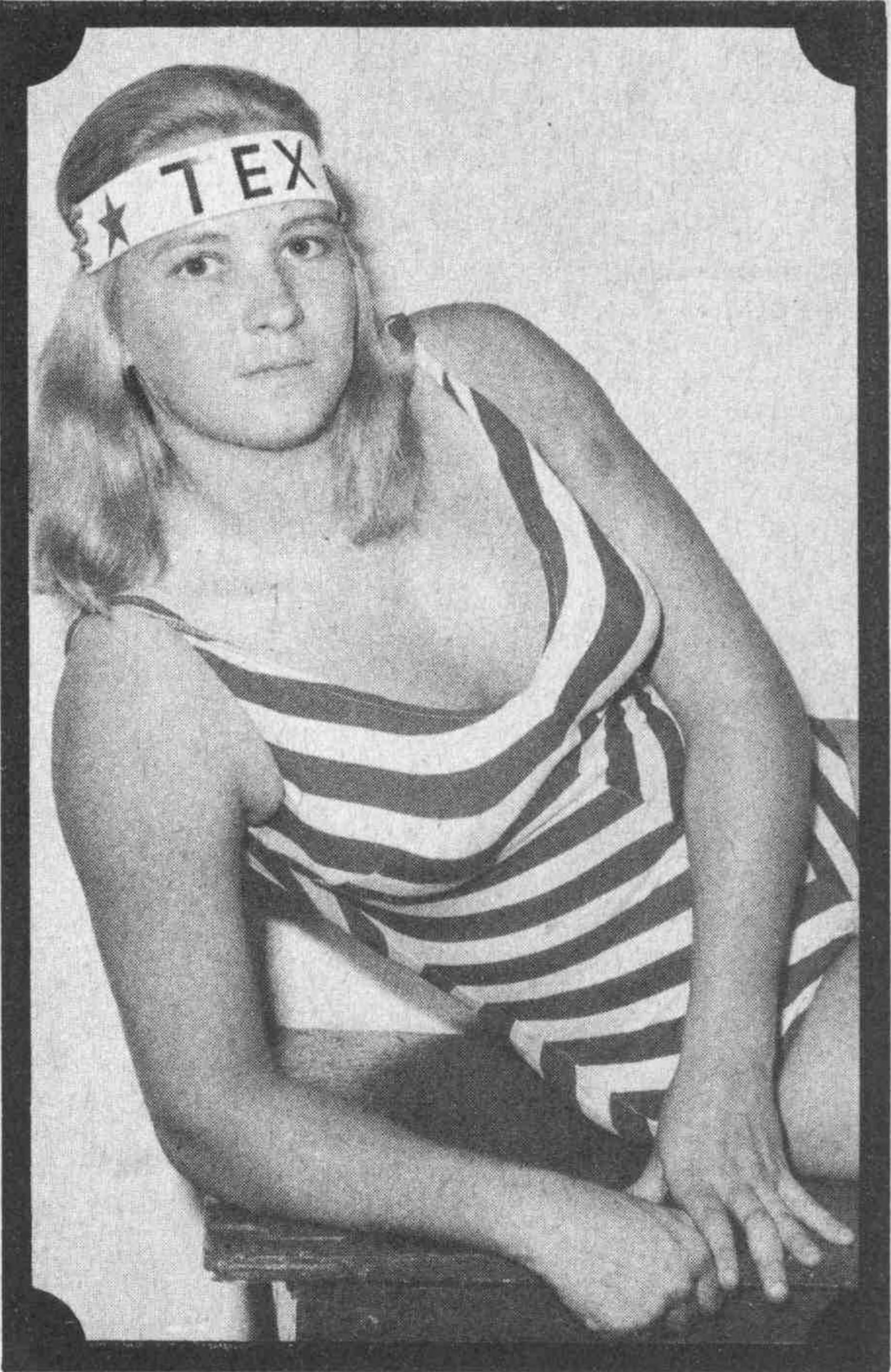
- Green, circa 1973

Personal information
- Born: Susan Tex Green; August 13, 1953 (age 72) Alice, Texas, U.S.

Professional wrestling career
- Ring name(s): Sue Green; Susan Green
- Billed height: 6 ft 1 in (1.85 m)
- Trained by: Joe Blanchard
- Debut: 1969
- Retired: 1997

Susan Tex Green (born August 13, 1953) is an American professional wrestler. She began wrestling at the age of 15 and was trained by Joe Blanchard. She was the frequent tag team partner of Sandy Parker, with whom she won the National Wrestling Alliance (NWA)'s NWA Women's World Tag Team Championship. The title reign, however, is unrecognized. In 1976, Green was recognized by Pro Wrestling Illustrated as the Girl Wrestler of the Year. In 1992, she joined the Professional Girl Wrestling Association, holding the promotion's championship and later acting as commissioner.

== Professional wrestling career ==
Green originally got into wrestling when her father took her to wrestling shows by promoter Joe Blanchard. Starting at the age of five, Sue and her dad had the same seats for ten years. After asking Blanchard for years to train her to wrestle, he finally did. At the age of 14, Green's parents met with Texas Governor John B. Connally and signed a release to allow Green to wrestle on the weekends because it did not interfere with school. She had her first match on her 15th birthday in Victoria, Texas against Maria DeLeon. While still in high school, Green wrestled in approximately 40 professional matches.

After graduating from high school, Green went to South Carolina to meet with The Fabulous Moolah, a promoter for female wrestling, who began booking her for matches. By the age of 20, she had toured in both Vietnam and Hong Kong. She later formed a partnership with Sandy Parker, with whom she defeated Donna Christanello and Toni Rose in November 1971 for the NWA Women's World Tag Team Championship. They re-lost the title to Christanello and Rose in February 1972. The title change is unrecognized.

In 1972, after New York legalized women's wrestling, Green participated in the second ever women's match at Madison Square Garden. On August 12, 1972, at Superbowl of Wrestling, Sue Green and Lily Thomas defeated Tippy Wells and Peggy Patterson to win the women's tag team tournament. Also in the 1970s, Green toured with the World Wide Wrestling Federation (later the World Wrestling Federation) and Leroy McGuirk's Mid-West territories.

In 1975 Green went to International Wrestling Enterprise in Japan, where she and Peggy Patterson went against Chiyo Obata and Kyoko Chigusa on January 6, 1975, in Korakuen Hall in Tokyo. Obata and Chigusa's second Terumi Sakura interfered near the end of the match by hitting Green on the back of the head with a metal bucket, bloodying and injuring Green and giving the Japanese duo the tainted win.

In 1976 Green was voted Pro Wrestling Illustrated's 1976 "Girl Wrestler of the Year". On February 2, 1976, in a shoot match Susan Tex Green put Moolah in a submission hold after being struck in the face and held the woman's championship for several days before being forced by Vince McMahon Sr. to surrender it back. This title reign was not recognized by the WWE.

In August 1979 Green broke her neck and back, putting her out of action until August 1982. On August 19, 1984, at Maple Leaf Gardens, Green defeated Donna Christanello.

In 1992 the Professional Girl Wrestling Association (PGWA) was formed after Randy Powell videotaped a match between Green and Judy Martin. On February 23, 1992, at the Ladies Professional Wrestling Association's Super Ladies Showdown, Green was defeated by Denise Storm in the first round of the LPWA Japanese Championship Tournament. She competed in the Women's Pro Wrestling organization in the early 1990s. Meanwhile, back in the PGWA, Green was recognized as the first PGWA Champion and feuded with Martin over the belt. In 1999, Martin defeated Green for the title in a mixed tag team match when Martin's partner pinned Green's partner. Green, however, regained the belt later that year but lost it to Angel Orsini in 2000. In July 1992, Green suffered from a crushed shoulder, so she did not wrestle again until 1996. She suffered another setback in February 2003, when she had knee surgery, putting her out of action again until February 2004 when she had a match with Charolette Webs. In November 2008, she was announced as PGWA's new commissioner. Green works as a wrestling trainer in Columbia, South Carolina.

== Personal life ==
Green grew up in Corpus Christi, Texas. In high school, she participated in tennis and swimming.

In 1988 she moved to South Carolina to work in the state Department of Corrections. She gave herself the middle name Tex because another woman by the same legal name was bouncing checks, and Green wanted to differentiate herself from her so she would stop being called by the police. By 2004, Green was working as a planning and development services inspector. She also became a professional wrestling trainer in South Carolina. In her "Gym of Pain and Glory", she trains mostly men. Leilani Kai counts Green as a mentor.

Green broke her ribs while working in the planning department in Columbia. The scar tissue from the injury began to spread, and it had to be removed. She had surgery to remove six inches of small intestine and two inches of colon. In early 2008, Green was hospitalized for at least two months with a staph infection that resulted from the previous surgery. She was hospitalized on February 5, 2008, and when doctors were looking at problems in her stomach and intestines, they discovered the infection. The infection caused her to be partially paralyzed on her left side, and in April, she was on a ventilator for four days. She was released from the hospital at the beginning of June, after re-learning how to walk. She then went to Texas to recuperate for a little over two months. By mid-June 2009, however, Green was well enough to participate in a wrestling match.

In July 2016 Green was named part of a class action lawsuit filed against WWE which alleged that wrestlers incurred traumatic brain injuries during their tenure and that the company concealed the risks of injury. The suit is litigated by attorney Konstantine Kyros, who has been involved in a number of other lawsuits against WWE. US District Judge Vanessa Lynne Bryant dismissed the lawsuit in September 2018.

Susan Tex Green is one of the producers on "Circle of Champions The History of Women's Pro Wrestling", which was directed by her former student Christopher Annino aka Rescue 911.

== Championships and accomplishments ==
- Cauliflower Alley Club
  - Other honoree (1994)
- National Wrestling Alliance
  - NWA Texas Women's Championship (4 time)
  - NWA World Women's Tag Team Championship (1 time) – with Sandy Parker
  - NWA Hall of Fame (Class of 2011)
- Professional Girl Wrestling Association
  - PGWA Championship (2 times)
- Pro Wrestling Illustrated
  - PWI Girl Wrestler of the Year (1976)
- Professional Wrestling Hall of Fame
  - Class of 2017
- Women's Wrestling Hall of Fame
  - Class of 2023
