= WWWA World Tag Team Championship =

Professional wrestling women's tag team championship

Details
- Promotion: All Japan Women's Pro-Wrestling
- Date established: June 30, 1971
- Date retired: April 2005
Statistics
- First champions: Aiko Kyo and Jumbo Miyamoto
- Final champions: Double Kong Aja Kong and Amazing Kong
- Most reigns: Jumbo Miyamoto/Yoshiko Miyamoto and Mariko Akagi (9 times)

The World Women's Wrestling Association (WWWA) World Tag Team Championship was the top doubles championship in All Japan Women's Pro-Wrestling (AJW) from 1971 until it closed in 2005. During those years the title was held by many of the most famous tag teams in Japanese women's professional wrestling, including the Beauty Pair (Jackie Sato and Maki Ueda) and the Crush Gals (Chigusa Nagayo and Lioness Asuka). The WWWA Tag Team belt succeeded AJW's original tag belt, the American Girls Wrestling Association (AGWA) International Tag Team Championship, which was contested in AJW from 1968 until 1971.

== Reigns ==
Key
No.	Overall reign number
Reign	Reign number for the specific team—reign numbers for the individuals are in parentheses, if different
Days	Number of days held

No.	Champion	Championship change			Reign statistics		Notes	Ref.
No.	Champion	Date	Event	Location	Reign	Days	Notes	Ref.
1	Aiko Kyo and Jumbo Miyamoto	June 30, 1971	Live Event	Tokyo, Japan	1	<1	Kyo and Miyamoto were awarded the belts as first champions. They immediately give up the belts on the same day, after being unsatisfied with their match against Patty O'Hara and Texas Red.	
—	Vacated	June 30, 1971	Live Event	Tokyo, Japan	—	—	Aiko Kyo and Jumbo Miyamoto vacated the championship as they were unsatisfied with their match against Patty O'Hara and Texas Red.	
2	Patty O'Hara and Texas Red	July 1, 1971	Live Event	Tokyo, Japan	1	5	O'Hara and Texas Red defeated Aiko Kyo and Jumbo Miyamoto in a rematch to win the vacant championship. This was a two-out-of-three falls match.	
3	Jumbo Miyamoto (2) and Maxie Murata	July 6, 1971	Live Event	Fukuyama, Hiroshima, Japan	1	86	This was a two-out-of-three falls match.	
4	Jane Sherill and Marie Vagnone	September 30, 1971	Live Event	Kawasaki, Kanagawa, Japan	1	5	This was a two-out-of-three falls match.	
5	Aiko Kyo and Yoshiko Miyamoto (3)	October 5, 1971	Live Event	Chiba, Japan	2	1	This was a two-out-of-three falls match. Yoshiko Miyamoto is formerly known as Jumbo Miyamoto.	
6	Jane Sherill and Marie Vagnone	October 6, 1971	Live Event	Niigata, Japan	2	24	This was a two-out-of-three falls match.	
7	Miyoko Hoshino and Yoshiko Miyamoto (4)	October 30, 1971	Live Event	Okayama, Japan	1	137	This was a two-out-of-three falls match.	
8	Masked Lee and Sharon Lee	March 15, 1972	Live Event	Nagoya, Aichi, Japan	1	6	This was a two-out-of-three falls match.	
9	Miyoko Hoshino and Yoshiko Miyamoto (5)	March 21, 1972	Live Event	Nagasaki, Japan	2	35	This was a two-out-of-three falls match.	
10	Flower Power and Masked Lee (2)	April 25, 1972	Live Event	Hiroshima, Japan	1	1	This was a two-out-of-three falls match.	
11	Miyoko Hoshino and Yoshiko Miyamoto (5)	April 26, 1972	Live Event	Osaka, Japan	3	87	This was a two-out-of-three falls match.	
12	Masked Lee (3) and Opearl Anston	July 22, 1972	Live Event	Iruma, Saitama, Japan	1	4		
13	Aiko Kyo and Yoshiko Miyamoto (6)	July 26, 1972	Live Event	Kasukabe, Saitama, Japan	3	54	This was a two-out-of-three falls match.	
14	Masked Lee (4) and Sylvia Hackney	September 18, 1972	Live Event	Muroran, Hokkaido, Japan	1	23		
15	Mariko Akagi and Yoshiko Miyamoto (7)	October 11, 1972	Live Event	Kumamoto, Japan	1	27		
16	Masked Lee (5) and Panama Franco	November 7, 1972	Live Event	Toyota, Aichi, Japan	1	10		
17	Mariko Akagi and Yoshiko Miyamoto (8)	November 17, 1972	Live Event	Kawasaki, Kanagawa, Japan	2	68		
18	Masked Lee (6) and Princess War Star	January 24, 1973	Live Event	Yokkaichi, Mie, Japan	1	9		
19	Mariko Akagi and Yoshiko Miyamoto (9)	February 2, 1973	Live Event	Okayama, Japan	3	43		
20	Jackie West and Masked Lee (7)	March 17, 1973	Live Event	Wakayama, Japan	1	5		
21	Mariko Akagi and Yoshiko Miyamoto (10)	March 22, 1973	Live Event	Hiroshima, Japan	4	81		
22	Masked Lee (9) and Sandy Parker	June 11, 1973	Live Event	Sasebo, Nagasaki, Japan	1	14		
23	Mariko Akagi and Yoshiko Miyamoto (11)	June 25, 1973	Live Event	Ōfunato, Iwate, Japan	5	22		
24	Masked Lee (10) and Sandy Parker	July 17, 1973	Live Event	Yokohama, Kanagawa, Japan	2	7		
25	Mariko Akagi and Yoshiko Miyamoto (12)	July 24, 1973	Live Event	Nagoya, Aichi, Japan	6	45		
26	Lita Marez and Masked Lee (11)	September 7, 1973	Live Event	Nagasaki, Japan	1	23		
27	Miyoko Hoshino (4) and Peggy Kuroda	September 30, 1973	Live Event	Himeji, Hyōgo, Japan	1	8		
28	Juanita de Hoyos and Masked Lee (12)	October 8, 1973	Live Event	Miyakonojō, Miyazaki, Japan	1	4		
29	Mariko Akagi (7) and Peggy Kuroda (2)	October 12, 1973	Live Event	Kumamoto, Japan	1	35		
30	Sarah Lee and Sylvia Hackney (2)	November 16, 1973	Live Event	Fukushima, Japan	1	18		
31	Mariko Akagi (8) and Peggy Kuroda (3)	December 4, 1973	Live Event	Osaka, Japan	2	34		
32	Jackie West (2) and Sharon Lee (2)	January 7, 1974	Live Event	Niigata, Japan	1	10		
33	Mariko Akagi (9) and Peggy Kuroda (4)	January 17, 1974	Live Event	Kagoshima, Japan	3	29		
34	Jackie West (3) and Sharon Lee (3)	February 15, 1974	Live Event	Hiroshima, Japan	2	1		
35	Junko Sasaki and Mariko Akagi (10)	February 16, 1974	Live Event	Onomichi, Hiroshima, Japan	1	33		
36	Jackie West (4) and Paula Niet	March 21, 1974	Live Event	Higashiōsaka, Osaka, Japan	1	1		
37	Junko Sasaki and Mariko Akagi (11)	March 22, 1974	Live Event	Wakayama, Japan	2	15		
38	Jackie West (5) and Paula Niet	April 6, 1974	Live Event	Toyama, Japan	2	18		
39	Junko Sasaki (3) and Peggy Kuroda (5)	April 24, 1974	Live Event	Kumamoto, Japan	1	22		
40	Jean Antone and Sandy Parker (3)	May 16, 1974	Live Event	Shizuoka, Japan	1	5		
41	Junko Sasaki (4) and Peggy Kuroda (6)	May 21, 1974	Live Event	Kōchi, Kōchi, Japan	2	13		
42	Betty Niccoli and Sandy Parker (4)	June 3, 1974	Live Event	Gifu, Japan	1	1		
—	Vacated	June 4, 1974	—	—	—	—	Betty Niccoli vacated the championship.	
43	Junko Sasaki (5) and Mariko Akagi (12)	June 5, 1974	Live Event	Nagoya, Aichi, Japan	3	9	Akagi and Sasaki defeated Jean Antoine and Sandy Parker to win the vacant championship.	
44	Betty Niccoli and Sandy Parker (5)	June 14, 1974	Live Event	Nagoya, Aichi, Japan	2	14	Akagi and Sasaki defeated Jean Antoine and Sandy Parker to win the vacant championship.	
45	Jumbo Miyamoto (13) and Junko Sasaki (6)	June 28, 1974	Live Event	Morioka, Iwate, Japan	1	1	Jumbo Miyamoto is formerly known as Yoshiko Miyamoto.	
46	Betty Niccoli and Sandy Parker (6)	June 29, 1974	Live Event	Isehara, Kanagawa, Japan	3	10		
47	Junko Sasaki (7) and Mariko Akagi (13)	July 9, 1974	Live Event	Osaka, Japan	4	12		
48	Betty Niccoli and Sandy Parker (7)	July 21, 1974	Live Event	Takikawa, Hokkaido, Japan	4	7		
49	Mariko Akagi (14) and Miyuki Yanagi	July 28, 1974	Live Event	Muroran, Hokkaido, Japan	1	2		
50	Jean Antone and Sandy Parker (8)	July 30, 1974	Live Event	Mizusawa, Iwate, Japan	2	6		
51	Jumbo Miyamoto (14) and Mariko Akagi (15)	August 5, 1974	Live Event	Tokyo, Japan	7	19	Jumbo Miyamoto is formerly known as Yoshiko Miyamoto.	
52	Jackie West (6) and Panama Franco (2)	August 24, 1974	Live Event	Fukuoka, Japan	1	10		
53	Jumbo Miyamoto (15) and Mariko Akagi (16)	September 3, 1974	Live Event	Hiroshima, Japan	8	26		
54	Jackie West (7) and Jane Sherill (3)	September 29, 1974	Live Event	Gobō, Wakayama, Japan	1	3		
55	Jumbo Miyamoto (16) and Junko Sasaki (8)	October 2, 1974	Live Event	Takamatsu, Kagawa, Japan	2	29		
56	Jane Sherill (4) and Miss Z	October 31, 1974	Live Event	Tokuyama, Yamaguchi, Japan	1	20		
57	Junko Sasaki (9) and Mariko Akagi (17)	November 20, 1974	Live Event	Matsumoto, Nagano, Japan	5	50		
58	Sylvia Hackney (3) and Miss Z (2)	January 9, 1975	Live Event	Matsumoto, Nagano, Japan	1	(Note: The exact date that Sylvia Hackney and Miss Z vacated the championship is unknown, meaning the reign lasted between 23 and 50 days.)		
—	Vacated	February 1975	—	—	—	—	Sylvia Hackney vacated the championship to pursue the WWWA World Single Championship.	
59	Jumbo Miyamoto (17) and Mariko Akagi (18)	March 1, 1975	Live Event	Tokyo, Japan	9	33	Akagi and Miyamoto defeated Sharon Lee and Sylvia Hackney to win the vacant championship.	
60	Lina Magnani and Lola Garcia	April 3, 1975	Live Event	Fukui, Japan	1	12		
61	Mach Fumiake and Mariko Akagi (19)	April 15, 1975	Live Event	Nagoya, Aichi, Japan	1	107		
—	Vacated	July 31, 1975	—	—	—	—	The championship was vacated after Mach Fumiake suffered an injury.	
62	Mach Fumiake and Mariko Akagi (20)	September 18, 1975	Live Event	Kumamoto, Japan	2	159	Akagi and Fumiake defeated Cheryl Day and Irma González to win the vacant championship.	
63	Beauty Pair (Jackie Sato and Maki Ueda)	February 24, 1976	Live Event	Tokyo, Japan	1	93		
64	Jackie West (8) and Yukari Lynch	May 27, 1976	Live Event	Kawasaki, Kanagawa, Japan	1	51		
65	Beauty Pair (Jackie Sato and Maki Ueda)	July 17, 1976	Live Event	Tokyo, Japan	2	244	Yukari Lynch vacated the championship to train for a martial arts match. The Beauty Pair defeated Cheryl Day and Jackie West to win the vacant championship.	
—	Vacated	March 18, 1977	Live Event	Japan	—	—	The championship was vacated after a match between Shinobu Aso and Yumi Ikeshita ended in a draw.	
66	Black Pair (Shinobu Aso and Yumi Ikeshita)	April 11, 1977	Live Event	Hiroshima, Japan	1	109	The Black Pair defeated the Beauty Pair (Jackie Sato and Maki Ueda) in a two-out-of-three falls match to win the vacant championship.	
67	Jackie Sato (3) and Nancy Kumi	July 29, 1977	Live Event	Tokyo, Japan	1	95		
—	Vacated	November 1, 1977	Live Event	Tokyo, Japan	—	—	The championship was vacated after Jackie Sato defeated Maki Ueda to win the WWWA World Single Championship.	
68	Golden Pair (Nancy Kumi (2) and Victoria Fujimi)	February 6, 1978	Live Event	Osaka, Japan	1	184	The Golden Pair defeated Chino Sato and Mariko Akagi to win the vacant championship.	
69	Queen Angels (Lucy Kayama and Tomi Aoyama)	August 9, 1978	Live Event	Tokyo, Japan	1	240		
70	Black Pair (Mami Kumano and Yumi Ikeshita (2))	April 6, 1979	Live Event	Tokyo, Japan	1	305		
71	Lucy Kayama (2) and Nancy Kumi (3)	February 5, 1980	Live Event	Osaka, Japan	1	316		
72	Ayumi Hori and Rimi Yokota	December 17, 1980	Live Event	Nagoya, Aichi, Japan	1	18		
—	Vacated	January 4, 1981	—	—	—	—	Rimi Yokota vacated the championship to pursue the WWWA World Single Championship.	
73	Ayumi Hori (2) and Nancy Kumi (4)	February 5, 1981	Live Event	Yokohama, Kanagawa, Japan	1	277	Hori and Kumi defeated Devil Masami and Mami Kumano to win the vacated championship.	
74	Mimi Hagiwara and Yukari Omori	November 9, 1981	Live Event	Obama, Fukui, Japan	1	274		
75	Devil Masami and Tarantula	August 10, 1982	Live Event	Fukushima, Japan	1	(Note: The length of the championship reign is too uncertain to calculate.)		
—	Vacated	1983	—	—	—	—	The championship was vacated for undocumented reasons.	
76	Dynamite Girls (Jumbo Hori (3) and Yukari Omori (2))	June 17, 1983	Live Event	Tokyo, Japan	1	435	The Dynamite Girls defeated Devil Masami and Taranchela to win the vacant championship. Hori is formerly known as Ayumi Hori.	
77	Crush Gals (Chigusa Nagayo and Lioness Asuka)	August 25, 1984	Live Event	Tokyo, Japan	1	184		
78	Villainous Alliance (Crane Yu and Dump Matsumoto)	February 25, 1985	Live Event	Tokyo, Japan	1	(Note: The exact date that the championship was vacated is unknown, meaning the reign lasted between 35 and 64 days.)		
—	Vacated	April 1985	—	—	—	—	The championship was vacated due to Crane Yu's retirement.	
79	Crush Gals (Chigusa Nagayo and Lioness Asuka)	May 16, 1985	Live Event	Ōmiya-ku, Saitama, Japan	2	213	The Crush Gals defeated Bull Nakano and Dump Matsumoto to win the vacant championship.	
—	Vacated	December 15, 1985	—	—	—	—	The championship was vacated after Chigusa Nagayo suffered ankle and knee injuries.	
80	The Jumping Bomb Angels (Itsuki Yamazaki and Noriyo Tateno)	January 5, 1986	Live Event	Tokyo, Japan	1	74	The Jumping Bomb Angels defeated Bull Nakano and Condor Saito to win the vacant championship.	
81	Crush Gals (Chigusa Nagayo and Lioness Asuka)	March 20, 1986	Live Event	Osaka, Japan	3	156		
82	Bull Nakano and Dump Matsumoto (2)	August 23, 1986	Live Event	Kawasaki, Kanagawa, Japan	1	162	Kazue Nagahori replaced Lioness Asuka and defended the championship with Chigusa Nagayo, as Asuka suffered an injury.	
—	Vacated	February 1, 1987	—	—	—	—	The championship was vacated for undocumented reasons.	
83	Hisako Uno and Yumiko Hotta	April 15, 1987	Live Event	Tokyo, Japan	1	12	Hotta and Uno defeated The Glamour Girls (Judy Martin and Leilani Kai to win the vacant championship.	
84	Red Typhoons (Kazue Nagahori and Yumi Ogura)	April 27, 1987	Live Event	Tokyo, Japan	1	176	This was a two-out-of-three falls match.	
85	Bull Nakano (2) and Condor Saito	October 20, 1987	War Dream	Tokyo, Japan	1	77	This was a two-out-of-three falls match.	
—	Vacated	January 5, 1988	—	—	—	—	The championship was vacated after a match between the Fire Jets (Mitsuko Nishiwaki and Yumiko Hotta).	
86	Bull Nakano (3) and Grizzly Iwamoto	February 25, 1988	Live Event	Kawasaki, Kanagawa, Japan	1	145	Iwamoto and Nakano defeated the Fire Jets (Mitsuko Nishiwaki and Yumiko Hotta) to win the vacant championship.	
87	Fire Jets (Mitsuko Nishiwaki and Yumiko Hotta (2))	July 19, 1988	Live Event	Tokyo, Japan	1	37		
88	Calgary Typhoons (Mika Komatsu and Yumi Ogura (2))	August 25, 1988	Live Event	Kawasaki, Kanagawa, Japan	1	163		
89	Crush Gals (Chigusa Nagayo and Lioness Asuka)	February 4, 1989	Live Event	Tokyo, Japan	4	91		
—	Vacated	May 6, 1989	—	—	—	—	The championship was vacated due to Chigusa Nagayo's retirement.	
90	Marine Wolves (Akira Hokuto (2) and Suzuka Minami)	June 18, 1989	Live Event	Tokyo, Japan	1	30	The Marine Wolves defeated Bison Kimura and Grizzly Iwamoto to win the vacant championship. Hokuto is formerly known as Hisako Uno.	
91	Fire Jets (Mitsuko Nishiwaki and Yumiko Hotta (3))	July 18, 1989	Live Event	Tokyo, Japan	2	144		
92	Aja Kong and Grizzly Iwamoto (2)	December 9, 1989	Live Event	Tokyo, Japan	1	60		
93	Marine Wolves (Akira Hokuto (3) and Suzuka Minami (2))	February 7, 1990	Live Event	Osaka, Japan	2	305		
94	Jungle Jack (Aja Kong (2) and Bison Kimura)	December 9, 1990	Live Event	Tokyo, Japan	1	33	This was a two-out-of-three falls match.	
—	Vacated	January 11, 1991	Live Event	Kawasaki, Kanagawa, Japan	—	—	The championship was vacated after Jungle Jack (Aja Kong and Bison Kimura) lost to Bull Nakano and Kyoko Inoue in a non-title Hair vs. Hair match.	
95	Jungle Jack (Aja Kong (3) and Bison Kimura)	April 4, 1991	Live Event	Sendai, Miyagi, Japan	2	249	Jungle Jack defeated the Marine Wolves (Akira Hokuto and Suzuka Minami) to win the vacant championship. This was a two-out-of-three falls match.	
—	Vacated	December 9, 1991	—	—	—	—	The championship was vacated for undocumented reasons.	
96	Jungle Jack (Aja Kong (4) and Bison Kimura)	January 5, 1992	Live Event	Tokyo, Japan	3	75	Jungle Jack defeated Kyoko Inoue and Toshiyo Yamada to win the vacant championship. This was a two-out-of-three falls match.	
97	Manami Toyota and Toshiyo Yamada	March 20, 1992	AJW St. Battle Day	Tokyo, Japan	1	387	In this match, the UWA World Women's Tag Team Championship which was held by Toyota and Yamada, was unified with the WWWA World Tag Team Championship. This was a two-out-of-three falls match.	
98	Dynamite Kansai and Mayumi Ozaki	April 11, 1993	Live Event	Osaka, Japan	1	239		
99	Manami Toyota and Toshiyo Yamada	December 6, 1993	AJW St. Battle Final	Tokyo, Japan	2	307		
100	Double Inoue (Kyoko Inoue and Takako Inoue)	October 9, 1994	Wrestlemarinepiad	Kawasaki, Kanagawa, Japan	1	86	This was a two-out-of-three falls match.	
—	Vacated	January 3, 1995	—	—	—	—	The championship was vacated as Kyoko Inoue and Takako Inoue decided to compete in tournament to determine the 100th champions.	
101	Double Inoue (Kyoko Inoue and Takako Inoue)	March 21, 1995	Wrestling Queendom Success	Osaka, Japan	2	187	Double Inoue defeated Blizzard Yuki and Manami Toyota in the finals of an eight-team tournament to be the 100th champions.	
102	Akira Hokuto (4) and Mima Shimoda	September 24, 1995	Innocent Stars in Kawasaki	Kawasaki, Kanagawa, Japan	1	120	This was a two-out-of-three falls match.	
103	Double Inoue (Kyoko Inoue and Takako Inoue)	January 22, 1996	Ota Ward Champion Legend	Tokyo, Japan	3	152	This was a two-out-of-three falls match.	
104	Manami Toyota (3) and Mima Shimoda (2)	June 22, 1996	Champions Night in Sapporo	Sapporo, Hokkaido, Japan	1	212	This was a two-out-of-three falls match.	
105	Kumiko Maekawa and Tomoko Watanabe	January 20, 1997	Ota Ward Champion Legend Zenjo Perfection - Day 13	Tokyo, Japan	1	149	This was a two-out-of-three falls match.	
106	Las Cachorras Orientales (Etsuko Mita and Mima Shimoda (3))	June 18, 1997	Zenjo Transformation - Day 36	Sapporo, Hokkaido, Japan	1	205		
—	Vacated	January 9, 1998	—	—	—	—	The championship was vacated for undocumented reasons.	
107	Zaps (Zap I and Zap T (2))	April 12, 1998	Zenjo RAN - Day 2	Tokyo, Japan	1	454	The Zaps defeated Kumiko Maekawa and Takako Inoue in a two-out-of-three falls match to win the vacant championship. Zap T is formerly known as Tomoko Watanabe.	
108	Las Cachorras Orientales (Etsuko Mita and Mima Shimoda (4)	July 10, 1999	Odaiba with Explosion - Day 1	Tokyo, Japan	2	151	This was a two-out-of-three falls match.	
109	Kumiko Maekawa and Tomoko Watanabe (3)	December 8, 1999	Live Event	Tokyo, Japan	2	164	This was a two-out-of-three falls match. Tomoko Watanabe is formerly known as Zap T.	
—	Vacated	May 20, 2000	—	—	—	—	The championship was vacated for undocumented reasons.	
110	Nana☆Momo☆ (Momoe Nakanishi and Nanae Takahashi)	July 16, 2000	Odaiba with Explosion	Tokyo, Japan	1	172	Nanamomo defeated Las Cachorras Orientales (Etsuko Mita and Mima Shimoda) in the finals of a six-team tournament to win the vacant championship.	
111	Las Cachorras Orientales (Etsuko Mita and Mima Shimoda (5)	January 4, 2001	Live Event	Tokyo, Japan	3	184	This was a two-out-of-three falls match.	
112	Nanae Takahashi (2) and Tomoko Watanabe (4)	July 7, 2001	Live Event	Tokyo, Japan	1	181		
113	Rumi Kazama and Takako Inoue (4)	January 4, 2002	Foture Shock - Day 2	Tokyo, Japan	1	149	This was a two-out-of-three falls match.	
114	Nana☆Momo☆ (Momoe Nakanishi and Nanae Takahashi (3))	June 2, 2002	Japan Grand Prix - Day 15: The Queendom of WWWA	Tokyo, Japan	2	119	This was a two-out-of-three falls match.	
115	Las Cachorras Orientales (Etsuko Mita and Mima Shimoda (6)	September 29, 2002	New Wrestlemarinepiad	Tokyo, Japan	4	85	This was a two-out-of-three falls match.	
—	Vacated	December 23, 2002	—	—	—	—	The championship was vacated after Las Cachorras Orientales lost at the Tag League the Best.	
116	Mima Shimoda (7) and Takako Inoue (5)	January 3, 2003	The Road of Women's Pro Wrestling - Day 1	Tokyo, Japan	1	107	Inoue and Shimoda defeated Kayo Noumi and Momoe Nakanishi in a two-out-of-three falls match to win the vacant championship.	
117	Etsuko Mita (5) and Nanae Takahashi (4)	April 20, 2003	The Road of Women's Pro Wrestling - Day 39	Tokyo, Japan	1	42	This was a two-out-of-three falls match.	
118	Kumiko Maekawa and Tomoko Watanabe (5)	June 1, 2003	New Flash - Day 10 (Afternoon Show)	Sapporo, Hokkaido, Japan	3	106	This was a two-out-of-three falls match.	
119	Double Inoue (Kyoko Inoue and Takako Inoue) (6)	September 15, 2003	Potential Power - Day 1	Tokyo, Japan	4	110	This was a two-out-of-three falls match.	
120	Ayako Hamada and Nanae Takahashi (5)	January 3, 2004	The Legend of Women's Pro Wrestling - Day 1	Tokyo, Japan	1	155	This was a two-out-of-three falls match.	
—	Vacated	June 6, 2004	—	—	—	—	The championship was vacated after Ayako Hamada and Nanae Takahashi split after a match against Kumiko Maekawa and Yumiko Hotta.	
121	Double Kong (Aja Kong (5) and Amazing Kong)	October 6, 2004	The Legend of Women's Pro Wrestling - Day 1	Tokyo, Japan	1	(Note: The exact date that AJW closed is unknown, meaning the reign lasted between 177 and 206 days.)	Aja Kong and Amazing Kong defeated Hikaru and Nanae Takahashi to win the vacant championship.	
—	Deactivated	April 2005	—	—	—	—	The championship retired when AJW closed.	

== Combined reigns ==
¤	The exact length of a title reign is uncertain; the combined length may not be correct.
N/A	The exact length of a title reign is too uncertain to calculate.

=== By team ===
Rank	Team	No. of reigns	Combined days
1	Manami Toyota and Toshiyo Yamada	2	694
2	Crush Gals (Chigusa Nagayo and Lioness Asuka)	4	644
3	Las Cachorras Orientales (Etsuko Mita and Mima Shimoda)	4	625
4	Double Inoue (Kyoko Inoue and Takako Inoue)	4	535
5	Zaps (Zap I and Zap T)	1	454
6	Dynamite Girls (Jumbo Hori and Yukari Omori)	1	435
7	Kumiko Maekawa and Tomoko Watanabe	4	419
8	Jungle Jack (Aja Kong and Bison Kimura)	3	357
9	Beauty Pair (Jackie Sato and Maki Ueda)	2	337
10	Jumbo/Yoshiko Miyamoto and Mariko Akagi	9	331
11	Lucy Kayama and Nancy Kumi	1	316
12	Black Pair (Mami Kumano and Yumi Ikeshita)	1	305
12	Marine Wolves (Akira Hokuto and Suzuka Minami)	2	305
14	Nana☆Momo☆ (Momoe Nakanishi and Nanae Takahashi)	2	291
15	Ayumi Hori and Nancy Kumi	1	277
16	Mimi Hagiwara and Yukari Omori	1	274
17	Mach Fumiake and Mariko Akagi	2	266
18	Miyoko Hoshino and Yoshiko Miyamoto	3	259
19	Queen Angels (Lucy Kayama and Tomi Aoyama)	1	240
20	Dynamite Kansai and Mayumi Ozaki	1	239
21	Manami Toyota and Mima Shimoda	1	212
22	Golden Pair (Nancy Kumi Victoria Fujimi)	1	184
23	Fire Jets (Mitsuko Nishiwaki and Yumiko Hotta)	2	181
23	Nanae Takahashi and Tomoko Watanabe	1	181
25	Double Kong; Aja Kong and Amazing Kong	1	177 – 206¤
26	Red Typhoons (Kazue Nagahori and Yumi Ogura)	1	176
27	Calgary Typhoons (Mika Komatsu and Yumi Ogura)	1	163
28	Bull Nakano and Dump Matsumoto	1	162
29	Rumi Kazama and Takako Inoue	1	149
30	Ayako Hamada and Nanae Takahashi	1	155
31	Bull Nakano and Grizzly Iwamoto	1	145
32	Akira Hokuto and Mima Shimoda	1	120
33	Junko Sasaki and Mariko Akagi	5	119
34	Black Pair (Shinobu Aso and Yumi Ikeshita)	1	109
35	Mima Shimoda and Takako Inoue	1	107
36	Mariko Akagi and Peggy Kuroda	3	98
37	Jackie Sato and Nancy Kumi	1	95
38	Jumbo Miyamoto and Maxie Murata	1	86
39	Bull Nakano and Condor Saito	1	77
40	The Jumping Bomb Angels (Itsuki Yamazaki and Noriyo Tateno)	1	74
41	Aja Kong and Grizzly Iwamoto	1	60
42	Aiko Kyo and Jumbo Miyamoto/Yoshiko Miyamoto	3	56
43	Jackie West and Yukari Lynch	1	51
44	Etsuko Mita and Nanae Takahashi	1	42
45	Junko Sasaki and Peggy Kuroda	2	35
45	Villainous Alliance (Crane Yu and Dump Matsumoto)	1	35 – 64¤
47	Betty Niccoli and Sandy Parker	4	32
48	Jumbo Miyamoto and Junko Sasaki	2	30
49	Jane Sherill and Marie Vagnone	2	29
50	Masked Lee and Sylvia Hackney	1	23
50	Lita Marez and Masked Lee	1	23
50	Sylvia Hackney and Miss Z	1	23 – 50¤
53	Masked Lee and Sandy Parker	2	21
54	Jane Sherill and Miss Z	1	20
55	Jackie West and Paula Niet	2	19
56	Ayumi Hori and Rimi Yokota	1	18
56	Sarah Lee and Sylvia Hackney	1	18
58	Hisako Uno and Yumiko Hotta	1	12
58	Lina Magnani and Lola Garcia	1	12
60	Jackie West and Sharon Lee	2	11
60	Jean Antone and Sandy Parker	2	11
62	Jackie West and Panama Franco	1	10
62	Masked Lee and Panama Franco	1	10
64	Masked Lee and Princess War Star	1	9
65	Miyoko Hoshino and Hoshino	1	8
66	Masked Lee and Sharon Lee	1	6
67	Jackie West and Masked Lee	1	5
67	Patty O'Hara and Texas Red	1	5
69	Juanita de Hoyos and Masked Lee	1	4
69	Masked Lee and Opearl Anston	1	4
71	Jackie West and Jane Sherill	1	3
72	Mariko Akagi and Miyuki Yanagi	1	2
73	Flower Power and Masked Lee	1	1
-	Devil Masami and Tarantula	1	N/A

=== By wrestler ===
Rank	wrestler	No. of reigns	Combined days
1	Mima Shimoda	7	1,064
2	Tomoko Watanabe/Zap T	5	1,054
3	Manami Toyota	3	906
4	Nancy Kumi	4	872
5	Mariko Akagi	20	849
6	Jumbo/Yoshiko Miyamoto	17	794
7	Takako Inoue	6	791
8	Yukari Omori	2	709
9	Toshiyo Yamada	2	694
10	Nanae Takahashi	5	669
11	Etsuko Mita	5	667
12	Chigusa Nagayo	4	644
12	Lioness Asuka	4	644
14	Aja Kong	5	594 – 623¤
15	Lucy Kayama	2	556
16	Kyoko Inoue	4	535
17	Akira Hokuto/Hisako Uno	4	467
18	Zap I	1	454
19	Jackie Sato	3	432
20	Kumiko Maekawa	3	419
21	Yumi Ikeshita	2	414
22	Bull Nakano	3	384
23	Bison Kimura	3	357
24	Yumi Ogura	2	339
25	Maki Ueda	2	337
26	Mami Kumano	1	305
26	Suzuka Minami	2	305
28	Ayumi Hori	2	295
29	Momoe Nakanishi	2	291
30	Mimi Hagiwara	1	274
31	Miyoko Hoshino	4	267
32	Mach Fumiake	2	266
33	Tomi Aoyama	1	240
34	Dynamite Kansai	1	239
34	Mayumi Ozaki	1	239
36	Grizzly Iwamoto	2	205
37	Dump Matsumoto	2	197 – 226¤
38	Yumiko Hotta	3	193
39	Junko Sasaki	9	184
39	Victoria Fujimi	1	184
41	Mitsuko Nishiwaki	2	181
42	Amazing Kong	1	177 – 206¤
43	Kazue Nagahori	1	176
44	Mika Komatsu	1	163
45	Ayako Hamada	1	155
46	Rumi Kazama	1	149
47	Peggy Kuroda	6	141
48	Shinobu Aso	1	109
49	Masked Lee	11	106
50	Jackie West	8	99
51	Maxie Murata	1	86
52	Condor Saito	1	77
53	Itsuki Yamazaki	1	74
53	Noriyo Tateno	1	74
55	Sandy Parker	8	64
55	Sylvia Hackney	3	64 – 91¤
57	Aiko Kyo	3	56
58	Jane Sherill	4	52
59	Yukari Lynch	1	51
60	Miss Z	2	43 – 70¤
61	Crane Yu	1	35 – 64¤
62	Betty Niccoli	4	32
63	Marie Vagnone	2	29
64	Lita Marez	1	23
65	Panama Franco	2	20
66	Paula Niet	2	19
67	Rimi Yokota	1	18
67	Sarah Lee	1	18
69	Sharon Lee	3	17
70	Lina Magnani	1	12
70	Lola Garcia	1	12
72	Jean Antone	2	11
73	Princess War Star	1	9
74	Patty O'Hara	1	5
74	Texas Red	1	5
76	Juanita de Hoyos	1	4
76	Opearl Anston	1	4
78	Miyuki Yanagi	1	2
79	Flower Power	1	1
-	Devil Masami	1	N/A
-	Tarantula	1	N/A

== See also ==
- List of professional wrestling promotions in Japan
- List of women's wrestling promotions
- Professional wrestling in Japan
