= Bison Kimura =

Japanese professional wrestler

Personal information
- Born: Nobuko Kimura; March 9, 1967 (age 59) Tokyo, Japan

Professional wrestling career
- Ring name(s): Bison Kimura; Nobuko Kimura
- Billed height: 1.68 m (5 ft 6 in)
- Billed weight: 75 kg (165 lb)
- Trained by: Jaguar Yokota; AJW Dojo
- Debut: 1986
- Retired: 1998

Nobuko Kimura (born March 9, 1967) is a retired Japanese professional wrestler better known by her ring name Bison Kimura who mainly worked for All Japan Women's Pro-Wrestling during the late 1980s and 1990s. She also worked for Frontier Martial-Arts Wrestling and Consejo Mundial de Lucha Libre in Mexico.

== Professional wrestling career ==
Kimura made her wrestling debut in 1986 for All Japan Women's Pro-Wrestling in her native Japan. She teamed up with Aja Kong during most of her career and won the WWWA World Tag Team Championship three times from 1990 to 1992.

She later teamed with Jaguar Yokota and Lioness Asuka.

In 1995, she worked in Mexico for Consejo Mundial de Lucha Libre where she participated in the vacated TWF World Women's Title. She defeated Xochitl Hamada in the quarter finals and Esther Moreno in the semi-finals. She lost to Lola Gonzalez in the Finals to become champion.

She retired in 1998.

== Championships and accomplishments ==
- All Japan Women's Pro-Wrestling
  - AJW Tag Team Championship (1 time) – with Aja Kong
  - All Pacific Championship (1 time)
  - WWWA World Tag Team Championship (3 times) – with Aja Kong (3)

== Luchas de Apuestas record ==
Winner (wager)	Loser (wager)	Location	Event	Date	Notes
Bull Nakano & Kyoko Inoue (hair)	Aja Kong & Bison Kimura (hair)	Kawasaki, Kanagawa, Japan	AJW event	November 1, 1991	
