= Crush Gals =

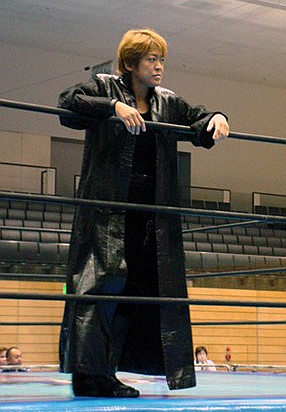
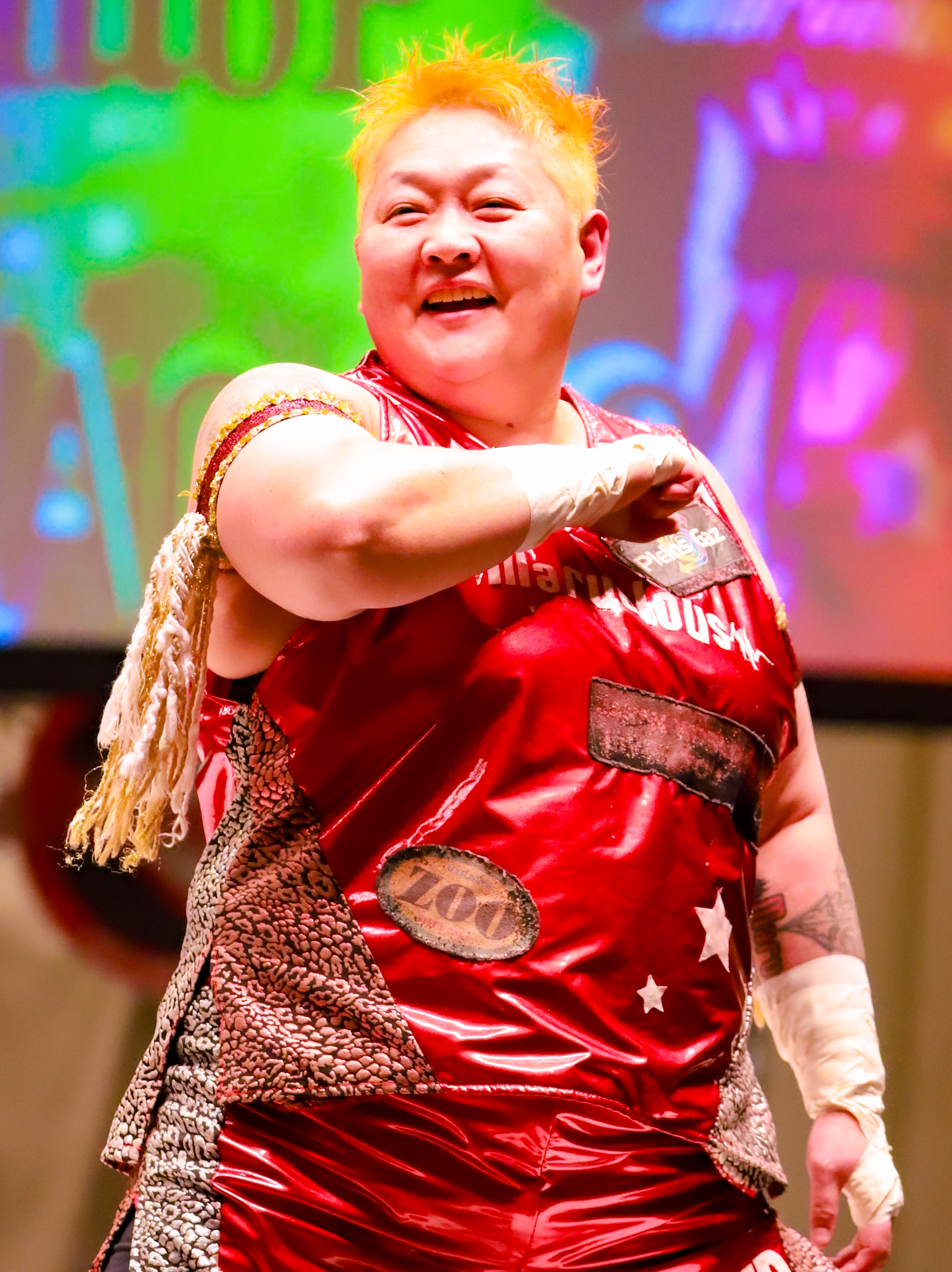
- Lioness Asuka (left) in 2006, Chigusa Nagayo in 2022

Tag team
- Members: Lioness Asuka; Chigusa Nagayo
- Names: The Crush Gals; Crush 2000
- Billed heights: Lioness Asuka: 5 ft 7 in (1.70 m); Chigusa Nagayo: 5 ft 5 in (1.65 m)
- Debut: 1983
- Years active: 1983–1989; 2000–2005

The Crush Gals were a professional wrestling tag team consisting of Lioness Asuka and Chigusa Nagayo. Formed in 1983 in the All Japan Women's Pro-Wrestling (AJW) promotion, the Crush Gals would become an extremely popular and influential unit throughout the 1980s, helping to propel both themselves and AJW into mainstream popularity in Japan. The Crush Gals, who combined youthfulness and an exciting wrestling style with pop music, became teen idols and developed a cult following amongst teenage girls in Japan. Helping the Crush Gals to achieve their initial success was AJW pitting them against contrasting antagonists such as Dump Matsumoto and her Atrocious Alliance stable; a group made up of slightly older women portraying violent, imitating face-painted characters inspired by the Sukeban subculture.

The Crush Gals were one of the primary attractions to AJW until their breakup in May 1989; AJW's internal policy that their performers must retire upon reaching the age of 26 saw both Asuka and Nagayo taking a hiatus from professional wrestling. However, both wrestlers would return within three years to professional wrestling (although outside of AJW), and in 2000, the pair would reunite in the promotion Nagayo created herself, GAEA Japan. This final run would last until 2005.

Individually, both Asuka and Nagayo would have long, tenured runs in professional wrestling, but their time as the Crush Gals represented the most popular era of their careers. Wrestling historians have compared their joint popularity in Japan in the mid-1980s to that of Hulk Hogan in the United States in the same period.

== Formation ==
The Crush Gals were created in January 1983. Previous to this, Lioness Asuka had debuted for AJW in May 1980 and was immediately considered a rising star while Chigusa Nagayo had also debuted in 1980, but her progress in the promotion was more gradual. It was on 4 January 1983 when the two rookies faced off against one another in a match that drew good reactions, leading to the duo being paired together. The name "Crush Gals" was inspired by Akira Maeda's nickname "Crush" and the Japanese girls magazine Gals. In June 1983, the Crush Gals wrestled Jaguar Yokota and Devil Masami to a 60-minute draw in front of 5,000 fans.

On 21 August 1984, the Crush Gals released their music single, "Bible of Fire", which would eventually sell over 100,000 copies and serve as the lead single for their 1984 album Square Jungle. Nagayo has stated that prior to the creation of "Bible of Fire", she had never sung in public before. Within days of the release of the single, on 25 August 1984 the Crush Gals defeated early rivals the Dynamite Girls (Jumbo Hori and Yukari Omori) to win the WWWA World Tag Team Championship at Korakuen Hall in Tokyo.

== Feuding with the Atrocious Alliance ==
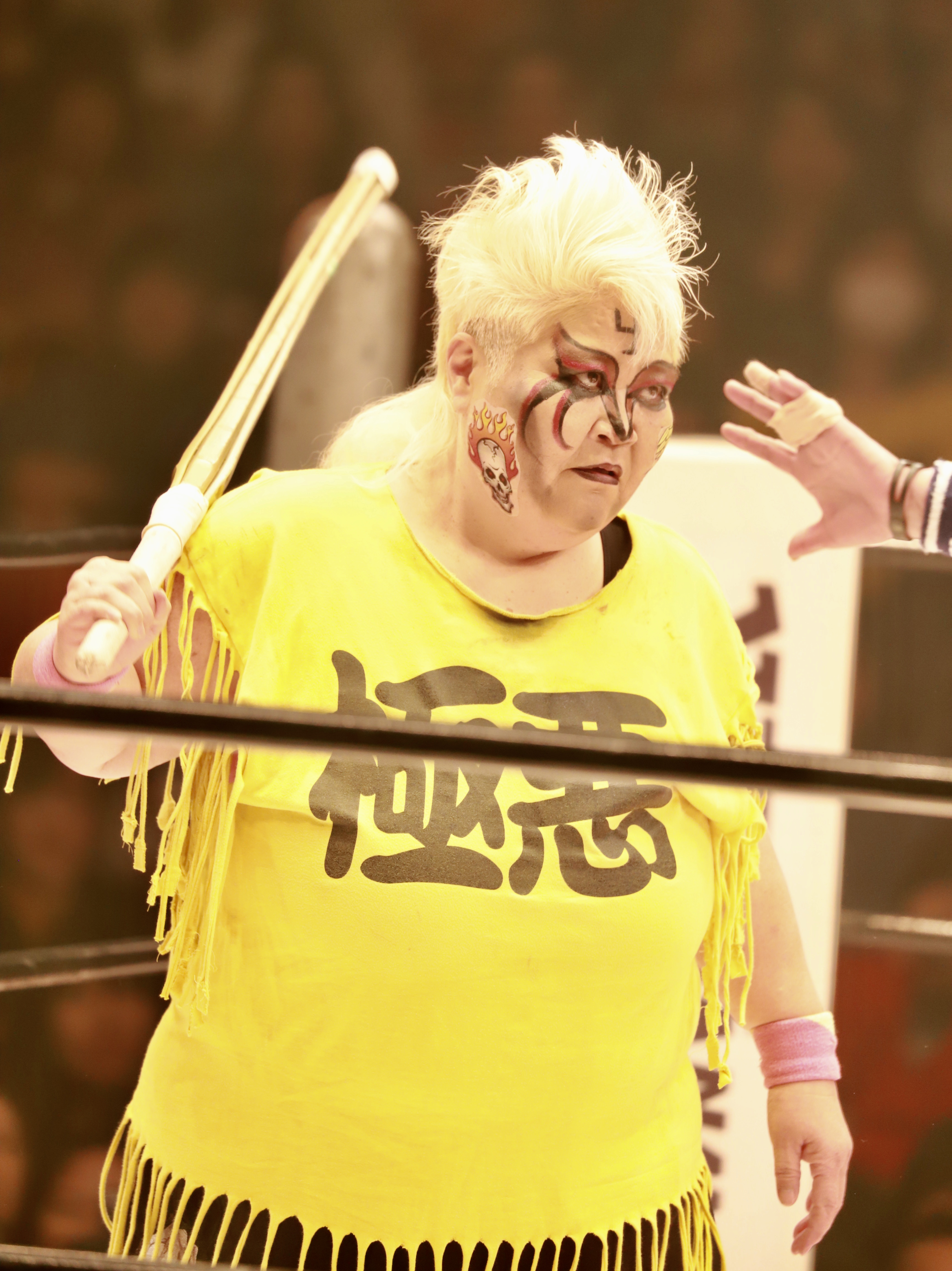
Dump Matsumoto, seen here in 2019, was a key rival to both the Crush Gals in the late 1980s

By this point, the Crush Gals had already achieved a high level of popularity and success by combining wrestling and music. However, their highest point came in 1985 when they began a rivalry with Dump Matsumoto's Atrocious Alliance. Matches between the Crush Gals and the Atrocious Alliance would regularly attract a 12.0 rating on Fuji TV, the station AJW broadcast on in Japan. This meant that 12% of the entire viewing audience in Japan that night were viewing the match. Wrestling historians have placed the Crush Gals' popularity at this point on par with Hulk Hogan in the United States.

On 25 February 1985, the Crush Gals would lose their WWWA World tag team championship to Matsumoto and Crane Yu of the Atrocious Alliance. Matsumoto and Yu would hold the titles until they were forced to vacate them two months later, following the retirement of Yu. The Crush Gals would recapture the titles in May, but their reign only lasted 21 days due to an injury. In August 1985, the feud between the Gals and the Atrocious Alliance escalated when Nagayo lost a hair vs hair match against the Mohawked Matsumoto and was forced to shave her head.

The feud with the Atrocious Alliance would continue into 1986, with the Crush Gals winning the WWWA World Tag Team Championship for a third time in March 1986, only to lose the titles to Matsumoto and her new partner Bull Nakano. However, Nagayo would gain a measure of revenge when she defeated Dump Matsumoto in a second hair vs hair match in October 1986.

== Singles stars ==
The Crush Gals' time spent feuding with the Atrocious Alliance had seen both Asuka and Nagayo rise to the top level of AJW, and resulted in major singles victories over the likes of Dump Matsumoto and Bull Nakano. This made both Asuka and Nagayo contenders for the top championship in AJW, the WWWA World Single Championship. In February 1987, Asuka and Nagayo would face each other in a singles match, with the winner receiving a championship match against the reigning Yukari Omari (their old rival from the Dynamite Girls). In a 35-minute bout that is cited as one of the best AJW matches of all time, Asuka came out victorious. Asuka went on to challenge Omari, but could not overcome her. However, Nagayo later received her own shot against Omari and was able to knock her off her throne in October 1987.

Thereafter, the Crush Gals would reunite a few more times to once again face the united force of Matsumoto and Omori, but inevitably, a match between the champion Nagayo and Asuka was due to take place. 1988 saw several matches pitting Asuka and Nagayo against each other for Nagayo's championship. During a face-off between the two of them in July 1988, Asuka won the title after Nagayo became injured during the match. However, immediately afterwards, Asuka vacated the title out of respect for Nagayo, stating she did not wish to win the title in that manner. Asuka would win the championship "the right way" in January 1989, during a rematch between the two.

== End of their AJW period ==
Both Asuka and Nagayo had reached the pinnacle of AJW. In February 1989, the pair would win the WWWA World tag team championship for a fourth and final time, defeating the Calgary Typhoons (Mika Komatsu and Yumi Ogura). They would hold the titles until Nagayo's retirement in May 1989. Asuka, the reigning WWWA World Champion, would follow Nagayo into retirement that July.

The retirement of AJW's top stars saw their business decline thereafter.

== Reunited ==
In the early 1990s, both Asuka and Nagayo would come out of retirement. Nagayo returned for AJW in 1993 for two matches, before quickly departing to work for JWP Joshi Puroresu, and created her own promotion, GAEA Japan in 1995. Asuka was allowed to return to AJW in 1994, although she was not promoted as the top-level competitor she had previously been.

Asuka would join GAEA Japan in 1999 as a villain and faced off against Nagayo in a series of matches. In 2000, she became a babyface and reunited the Crush Gals with Nagayo under the name "Crush 2000". The pair would remain a semi-regular team until 2005, when both Asuka and Nagayo sought to retire and GAEA Japan closed down.

== Championships and accomplishments ==
- All Japan Women's Pro-Wrestling
  - WWWA World Tag Team Championship (4 times)
  - Tag League the Best (1987)
- GAEA Japan
  - AAAW Tag Team Championship (1 time)
