= Silver (film) =

1999 film by Takashi Miike

Silver - shirubaa
- Directed by: Takashi Miike
- Written by: Hisao Maki; Saburô Takemoto
- Produced by: Keita Sasaki; Fujio Matsushima; Naoki Abe
- Cinematography: Yasuhiko Mitsui
- Edited by: Yasushi Shimamura
- Music by: Koji Endo
- Distributed by: Museum K.K.
- Release date: September 21, 1999
- Running time: 79 minutes
- Country: Japan
- Language: Japanese

Silver (シルバー, Shirubaa) is a 1999 Japanese crime action film directed by Takashi Miike.

== Plot ==
Jun Shirogane's entire family is killed in a house fire set by criminal gang while she is away at a karate tournament. She is subsequently hired to be the first member of Fear of God, a new branch of the Japanese Secret Service. She joins forces with her former partner, a judo champion, reforming the team known as "the Flower and the Dragon". She is given the cover identity of Jun Silver, a touring member of the Ladies Legend Pro-Wrestling team under manager Rumi Kazama.

Her first target is the blackmailer Mistress Nancy Otori, whom she interrupts dominating President Mah Sasazaki of Ryowa Bank. Jun is caught and whipped until Nancy is called away to dominate the boss of the Otsunami Family and Jun breaks free and escapes. President Sasazaki has her brought to his office and attempts to shoot her in order to keep his secret safe but she overpowers him as well as the members of the Otsunami Family, then returns to Mistress Nancy but is unable to find film negatives or a list of her clients.

Angered at being two-timed by Nancy, Agent 004 of the secret criminal organization known as the Viper's Nest offers Jun Nancy's negatives and list of clients if she defeats him in battle. She meets him at Shibaura Pier, where she uses her coin-throwing skills to defeat his dart-throwing skills, then fends off his attacks in hand-to-hand combat. Impressed with her skills, he offers her a truce but is then shot by an unknown female sniper as Jun escapes.

== Cast ==
- Atsuko Sakuraba as Jun Shirogane / Silver
- Yasukaze Motomiya as Agent 004
- Rumi Kazama as Rumi Kazama
- Shinobu Kandori as Shinobu Kandori
- Saki Kurijara
- Koji Tsukamoto
- Tommy Ran
- Punch Tahara
- Hisao Maki
- Keiji Matsuda
