= Year End Spectacular (1996) =

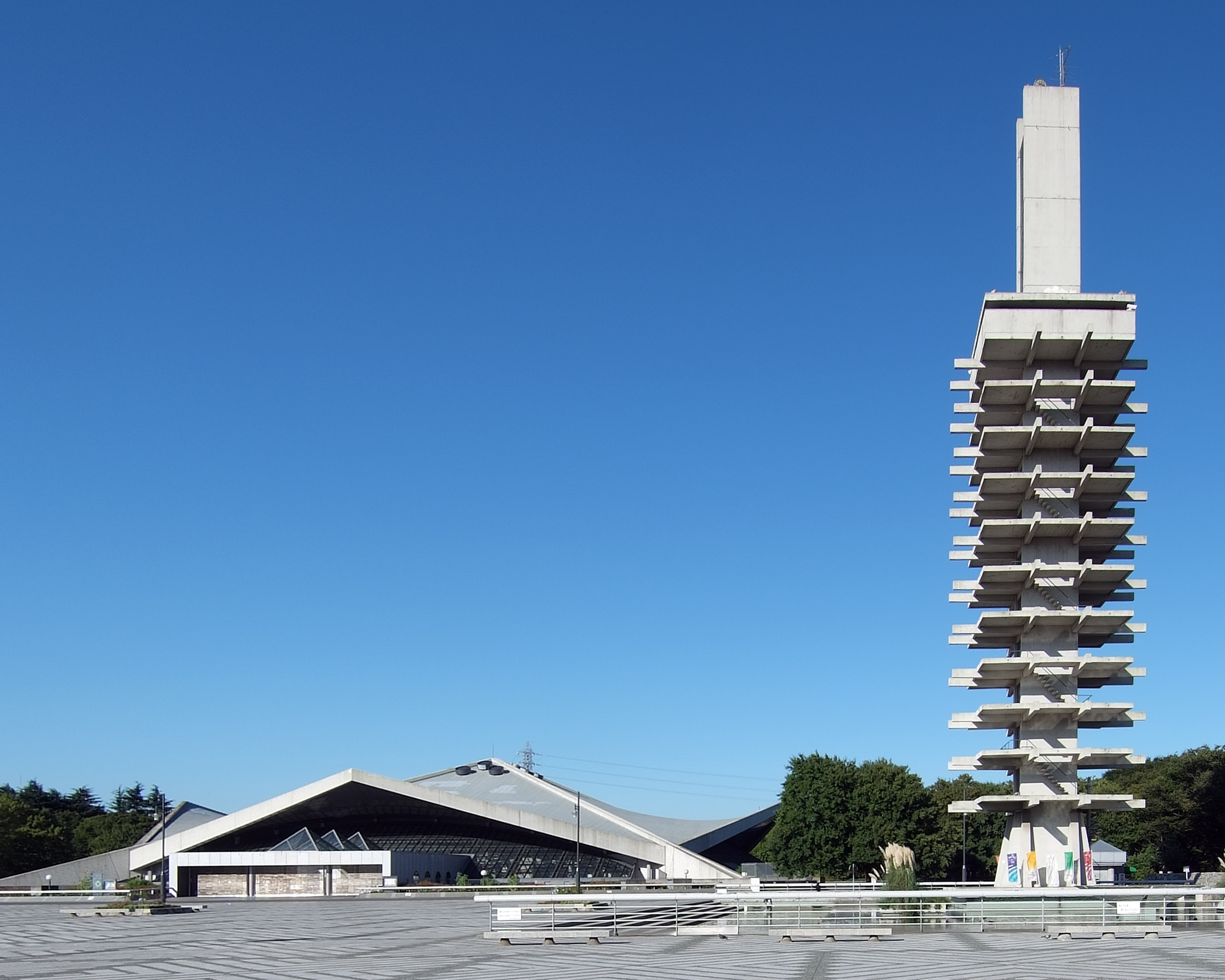
- Promotion: Frontier Martial-Arts Wrestling
- Date: December 11, 1996
- City: Tokyo, Japan
- Venue: Komazawa Gymnasium
- Attendance: 7,923

Event chronology
| ← Previous; Summer Spectacular: Shiodome Legend | Next → FMW 8th Anniversary Show |

Year End Spectacular chronology
| ← Previous; 1995 | Next → last |

Year End Spectacular (1996) was the third and final Year End Spectacular professional wrestling event produced by Frontier Martial-Arts Wrestling on December 11, 1996. The event was a part of the 1996 Year End Sensation tour, which concluded with the Year End Spectacular event.

The event marked the in-ring return of Atsushi Onita since his retirement at the 6th Anniversary Show and the retirement of Mr. Pogo as both men teamed up with Masato Tanaka and Tetsuhiro Kuroda against the Funk Masters of Wrestling team of Terry Funk, Hisakatsu Oya and The Headhunters in a Texas Tornado Street Fight Deathmatch. Other predominant matches at the event were an interpromotional match between Hayabusa and The Great Sasuke, which Hayabusa won and a title unification match between The Gladiator and W*ING Kanemura for Gladiator's FMW Brass Knuckles Heavyweight Championship and Kanemura's FMW Independent Heavyweight Championship, which Gladiator won to unify both titles and both titles became collectively known as the FMW Double Championship.

== Background ==
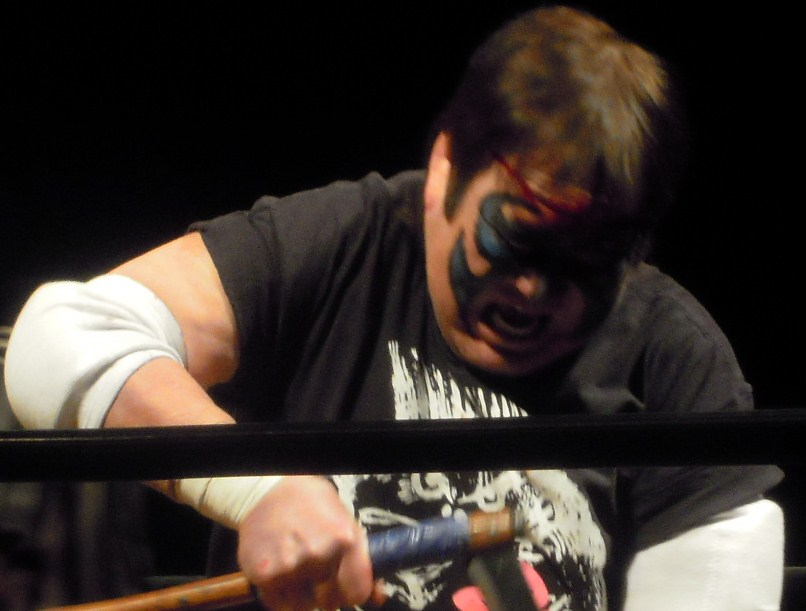
Mr. Pogo wrestled his retirement match at the Year End Spectacular event.

At Summer Spectacular, Terry Funk defeated Mr. Pogo via knockout in a no rope barbed wire landmine match. Pogo had injured his neck when he fell into the exploding barbedwire after Funk blew fire on him. However, Pogo continued to wrestle and feud with the Puerto Rican Army. The Puerto Rican Army continued to grow in strength. On September 15, Lethal Weapon members Hisakatsu Oya and Horace Boulder turned on Ricky Fuji to join the Puerto Rican Army, forcing Lethal Weapon to end. Later in the main event, Hayabusa, Koji Nakagawa, Masato Tanaka and Tetsuhiro Kuroda defeated Puerto Rican Army's Hisakatsu Oya, Super Leather and The Headhunters in a 20 million yen on a pole match to regain the yens which FMW had lost to the Puerto Rican Army at the 7th Anniversary Show. On September 24, Terry Funk and The Gladiator defeated Hayabusa and Tanaka. Then Funk replaced the Puerto Rican Army to form his new group Funk Masters of Wrestling, seeking revenge on Atsushi Onita for beating him at the 4th Anniversary Show. On October 28, Pogo announced that he would retire at Year End Spectacular. He begged his longtime rival Atsushi Onita to come out of retirement for only one match and team with him against the Funk Masters of Wrestling, but Onita refused. On November 26, Oya and The Headhunters defeated the FMW team of Masato Tanaka, Koji Nakagawa and Mr. Pogo and then Funk Masters of Wrestling attacked Pogo after the match, which led Onita to make the save for Pogo and then Onita announced that he was coming out of retirement to team with Pogo at Year End Spectacular. Just one night away from Year End Spectacular on December 10, the Funk Masters of Wrestling team of Terry Funk, The Gladiator, Hisakatsu Oya and The Headhunters defeated the FMW team of Hayabusa, Masato Tanaka, Mr. Pogo, Tetsuhiro Kuroda and Gosaku Goshogawara to get the last laugh before Year End Spectacular.

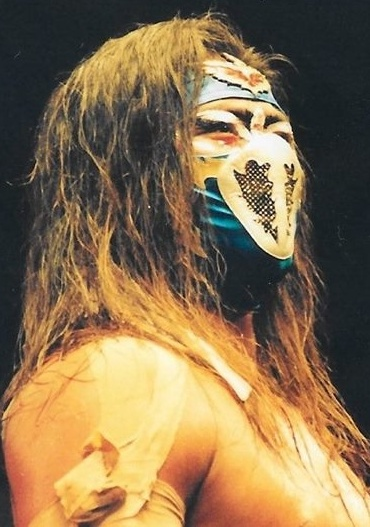
Hayabusa wrestled Michinoku Pro Wrestling's The Great Sasuke in an interpromotional match at Year End Spectacular.

At Summer Spectacular, W*ING Kanemura defeated Masato Tanaka in the finals of a tournament to become the inaugural Independent Heavyweight Champion. Kanemura suffered an injury shortly after his title win and returned to FMW on October 12 to successfully defend the title against Hisakatsu Oya. The Brass Knuckles Heavyweight Champion The Gladiator attacked Kanemura after the match and challenged him to a title unification match at Year End Spectacular, which Kanemura accepted. Gladiator and Kanemura competed in many tag team matches before the event in the build-up to their title match.

On September 20, Hayabusa lost a match to Hisakatsu Oya and then Jinsei Shinzaki of Michinoku Pro Wrestling debuted in FMW and challenged Hayabusa to a match at the MPW's third anniversary show These Days, which Hayabusa lost. After the match, The Great Sasuke challenged Hayabusa to a friendly match at Year End Spectacular, which Hayabusa accepted. On November 16, Hayabusa defeated MPW's TAKA Michinoku in a warm-up for his match with Sasuke.

Tensions had been rising between the Mad Dog Military (Shark Tsuchiya, Crusher Maedomari and Bad Nurse Nakamura) during the summer of 1996. At Summer Spectacular, Megumi Kudo defeated Mad Dog Military in a handicap match to retain the WWA World Women's and FMW Independent Women's Championship after Nakamura turned on her team by hitting Tsuchiya with a barbed wire stick which was intended for Kudo. Nakamura turned fan favorite, left Mad Dog Military and then changed her ring name to RIE in a match against Kudo on August 21. RIE began teaming with FMW's women's team to feud with her former Mad Dog Military teammates, heading to a match between the teams at Year End Spectacular.

On November 16, Ladies Legend Pro-Wrestling's (LLPW) Michiko Omukai lost to Mad Dog Military members Crusher Maedomari and Shark Tsuchiya in a handicap match. Later in the show, Megumi Kudo defeated RIE and then LLPW's Shinobu Kandori debuted in FMW and confronted Kudo as she was irate at Omukai's defeat and Omukai separated the two from brawling with each other. The confrontation set up a match between the two ladies at Year End Spectacular.

== Event ==
=== Preliminary matches ===
In the first match, Funk Masters of Wrestling members Super Leather and Crypt Keeper took on W*ING Alliance's Hideki Hosaka and Dragon Winger. Leather kicked the referee in the groin as the match began to use foreign objects. Near the end of the match, Leather performed a missile dropkick on Winger and performed a kneeling reverse piledriver to gain a near-fall. Leather followed with a brainbuster to win the match.

RIE brought in Ladies Legend Pro-Wrestling's (LLPW) Chikaro Shiratori as her tag team partner against Mad Dog Military (Shark Tsuchiya and Crusher Maedomari). Tsuchiya performed a Tsuchi Bomb on RIE to win the match.

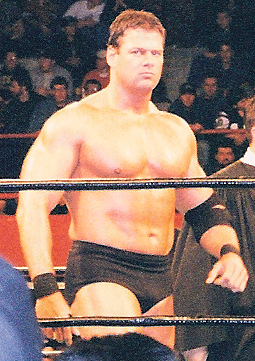
The Gladiator, the defending Brass Knuckles Heavyweight Champion defeated the Independent Heavyweight Champion W*ING Kanemura at the event to unify both titles.

The FMW Brass Knuckles Heavyweight Championship and the FMW Independent Heavyweight Championship were put on the line in a title unification match to unify for both titles as the Brass Knuckles Heavyweight Champion The Gladiator took on the Independent Heavyweight Champion W*ING Kanemura. Mid-way through the match, Kanemura performed a diving splash on Gladiator through a wooden table taking the W*ING flag down with him. Near the end of the match, Gladiator performed an Awesome Bomb to get a near-fall. Gladiator attempted another but Kanemura slid out of it but Gladiator maintained his dominance by performing a short-arm lariat and then hit a wooden board on Kanemura's head and followed with an Awesome Bomb to win the match and unify the Brass Knuckles Heavyweight Championship and the Independent Heavyweight Championship, making them the unified FMW Double Championship.

Megumi Kudo took on LLPW's Shinobu Kandori. Kandori disrespected Kudo by pulling her hand out for Kudo to shake and then pulled it back and Kudo attacked her. Kandori performed an armbar on Kudo and worked on Kudo's arm during the earlier part of the match. After a back and forth match, Kudo attempted to perform a Kudo Driver on Kandori but Kandori overpowered her and then attempted to perform a Powerbomb but Kudo slipped out of it and charged at Kandori but Kandori choked her and Kudo was knocked out, with Kandori being awarded the match via referee stoppage. After the match, Kandori poured a bottle of water on Kudo's face as an insult.

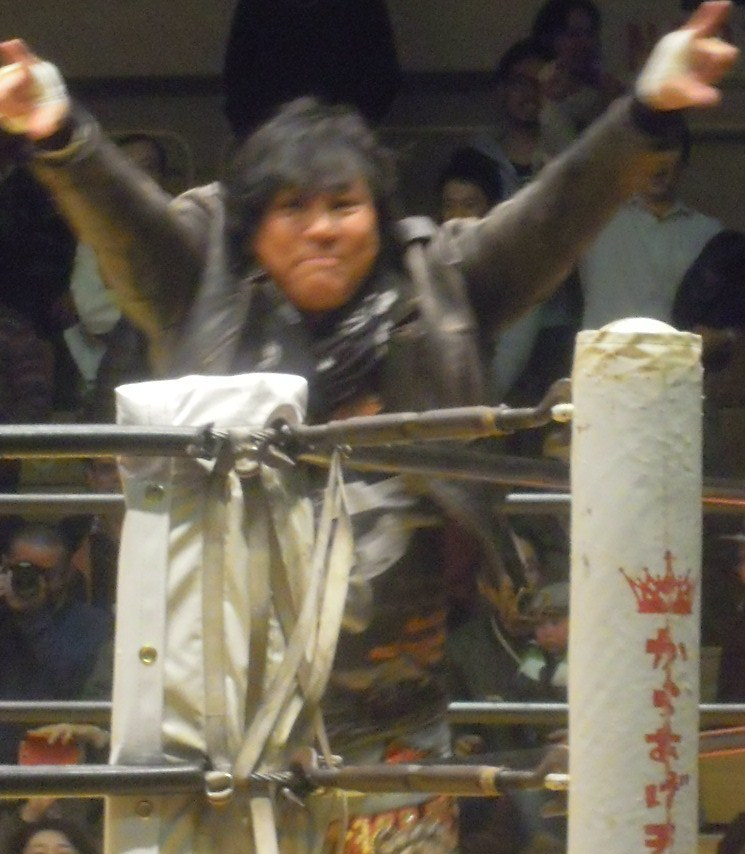
Atsushi Onita competed in his first FMW match at Year End Spectacular since his retirement at the FMW 6th Anniversary Show in 1995.

Hayabusa took on Michinoku Pro Wrestling's (MPW) The Great Sasuke. Both men traded momentum with each other and Sasuke infuriated Hayabusa by kicking out of a pinfall attempt after a Firebird Splash. Sasuke made comeback into the match with a Sasuke Special 2 and a springboard moonsault. Near the end of the match, Sasuke attempted a missile dropkick on Hayabusa but Hayabusa dropkicked him in mid-air, knocking both men down to the mat. Sasuke attempted a Frankensteiner on Hayabusa from the top rope but Hayabusa countered it with a Falcon Arrow to win the match.

=== Main event match ===
Atsushi Onita came out of retirement to compete in his first FMW match in over a year by teaming with the retiring Mr. Pogo, Masato Tanaka and Tetsuhiro Kuroda to represent FMW against Funk Masters of Wrestling's Terry Funk, Hisakatsu Oya, Headhunter A and Headhunter B in a Texas Tornado Street Fight Deathmatch. Both teams competed in the deathmatch wrestling style throughout the match. Near the end of the match, the FMW team gained momentum as Pogo grabbed a barbed wire baseball bat and began attacking the opposing team with it. Headhunter A attempted a moonsault on Tanaka but he countered it and hit a Rolling Elbow twice. Onita nailed a chair on the Headhunter and Tanaka performed a backdrop suplex to win the match. After the match, Hayabusa joined the winning FMW team in the ring and they celebrated and paid tribute to the retiring Pogo.

== Reception ==
Stuart of Puroresu Central praised the event and the three main event matches were considered to be "really good matches" and each match having "its own style and focus.", with "The unification match had a great wrestling/garbage blend and was really choice. The third was a crazy spotfest with lots of "how did he...?" spots. The main event was just a total, whacked out insane brawl, FMW style. Lots of blood shed on the canvas and a great atmosphere. This is a good introduction to old school FMW, although the 5/5/96 show is probably better, since it had more matches. Good wrestling, good brawling."

== Aftermath ==
Megumi Kudo continued her feud with Shinobu Kandori after losing to her at Year End Spectacular. On January 5, 1997, Kandori defeated Kudo in a street fight at a LLPW show. The two competed again in a no ropes barbed wire deathmatch at a FMW show on March 14, which Kudo won. After the match, Kudo and Kandori shook hands to end the feud. Kudo lost her Women's Championship to Shark Tsuchiya on March 21, only to regain it in her retirement match at 8th Anniversary Show. Kudo's retirement also marked the first time that a women's match headlined the Anniversary Show event.

Just like Atsushi Onita, Mr. Pogo broke his retirement vow as well. He joined FMW's rival deathmatch wrestling promotion Big Japan Pro Wrestling (BJW) on July 23, 1997 by defeating The Great Kojika. Pogo returned to FMW in 1998 as "The Great Pogo" to feud with Onita and their rivalry culminated in a match between the two on November 20, which Onita won to end their feud in FMW once and for all. This was the last match for both Onita and Pogo in FMW.

The Gladiator continued his dominant reign as the FMW Double Champion after unifying the titles at Year End Spectacular. He successfully defended the title against Masato Tanaka on February 18, 1997, before Tanaka defeated Gladiator for the title at Fall Spectacular. As a result, Gladiator would become the longest reigning Brass Knuckles Heavyweight Champion and the longest reigning Independent Heavyweight Champion in FMW history.

== Results ==
| No. | Results | Stipulations | Times |
|---|---|---|---|
| 1 | Super Leather and Crypt Keeper defeated Hideki Hosaka and Dragon Winger | Tag team match | 11:49 |
| 2 | Mad Dog Military (Shark Tsuchiya and Crusher Maedomari) defeated Chikako Shiratori and RIE | Tag team match | 15:27 |
| 3 | Brass Knuckles Heavyweight Champion The Gladiator defeated Independent Heavyweight Champion W*ING Kanemura | Title unification match to unify the FMW Brass Knuckles Heavyweight Championship and the FMW Independent Heavyweight Championship | 17:14 |
| 4 | Shinobu Kandori defeated Megumi Kudo (with Kaori Nakayama) via referee stoppage | Singles match | 14:30 |
| 5 | Hayabusa defeated The Great Sasuke | Singles match | 19:12 |
| 6 | Atsushi Onita, Mr. Pogo, Masato Tanaka and Tetsuhiro Kuroda defeated Funk Masters of Wrestling (Terry Funk, Hisakatsu Oya, Headhunter A and Headhunter B) | Texas Tornado Street Fight Deathmatch | 23:04 |
