= Rumi Kazama =

Japanese professional wrestler (1965–2021)

Personal information
- Born: Rumie Saito; November 28, 1965 Taitō, Tokyo, Japan
- Died: September 21, 2021 (aged 55) Tokyo, Japan

Professional wrestling career
- Ring name: Rumi Kazama
- Billed height: 1.53 m (5 ft 0 in)
- Billed weight: 57 kg (126 lb)
- Debut: August 17, 1986
- Retired: May 4, 2012

Rumi Kazama (風間 ルミ, Kazama Rumi; November 28, 1965 – September 21, 2021) was a Japanese professional wrestler and promoter. Along with Shinobu Kandori, she co-founded the promotion Ladies Legend Pro-Wrestling.

== Personal life and career ==
Born Rumie Saito (斉藤 ルミエ), Rumi Kazama was a kickboxer in high school. In 1985, she transitioned to shoot boxing, after being invited by Takeshi Caesar to join his promotion. She participated in shoot boxing's first women's fight.

In 1986, Kazama transitioned to professional wrestling after being invited by Jackie Sato to join Japan Women's Pro-Wrestling. She made her debut on JWP's very first card on August 17, 1986. By 1992, JWP dissolved and split into two groups (Ladies Legend Pro-Wrestling and JWP Joshi Puroresu) and Kazama joined LLPW, where not only she was an active wrestler, but she was also the president of the promotion.

In August 1993, Kazama unsuccessfully challenged Akira Hokuto for the All Pacific Championship. Three months later, she again lost to Hokuto, this time in a hair vs. hair match, forcing Kazama to shave her head.

In December 1997, Kazama won her first championship, the LLPW Six-Woman Tag Team Championship with Noriyo Tateno and Yasha Kurenai, defeating Lioness Asuka, Shark Tsuchiya and Eagle Sawai. They would hold onto the titles until September 1998, losing the belts back to Asuka, Tsuchiya and Sawai. In January 2000, she regained the titles with Eagle Sawai and Carol Midori, defeating Noriyo Tateno, Keiko Aono and Karula. They would hold onto the belts until April 2000, when the titles were vacated due to Kazama and Sawai breaking up with Midori.

Soon after, Kazama and Eagle Sawai formed Black Joker with Takako Inoue. In September 2000, Black Joker defeated Manami Toyota, Nanae Takahashi and Miho Wakizawa in a tournament final to win the vacant six-woman tag team titles, Kazama's third reign. They would hold the titles for nearly two years, until losing them in June 2002 to Mizuki Endo, Keiko Aono and Rieko Amano. During that reign, Kazama defeated Miho Wakizawa to win the AJW Championship in May 2001, but vacated the title after winning it. In January 2002, Kazama and Inoue won the WWWA World Tag Team Championship, defeating Nanae Takahashi and Tomoko Watanabe. They would hold the titles until July 2002, when they lost the belts to Takahashi and her new partner, Momoe Nakanishi. In March 2002, she defeated Carol Midori to win the LLPW Singles Championship. She would hold the title until March 2003, when she lost to her Black Joker stablemate Eagle Sawai. On August 3, 2003, in her retirement match, she defeated Mako Ogawa to win her second LLPW Singles title and retire as champion.

In 2006, she came out of retirement for one night only, teaming with Genichiro Tenryu in a loss to Eagle Sawai and Magnum TOKYO in WAR's farewell show. Three years later, she took part in a six-woman tag team match dedicated to the memory of Plum Mariko; she teamed up with Shinobu Kandori and Mayumi Ozaki in a loss to Dynamite Kansai, Harley Saito and Command Bolshoi.

In 2012, she joined Dramatic Dream Team's Union Pro Wrestling as a valet to Isami Kodaka and Hiroshi Fukuda. Her final match took place on May 4, 2012, teaming with Kodaka and defeating Fukuda in a handicap match. In 2013, she became a commissioner for the Fly To Everywhere World Championship.

== Other fields ==
Kazama had posed for several modeling photobooks and magazines since her time as a shoot boxer. In 1987, she released a music single called "Tokai no Ryūsei 〜 Horoscope Magic." In 1988, she began acting in films, beginning with her promo video, "HEAT UP VENUS," which was released in May 1988. She had also acted in Silver (1999) and did the voice of the Gods for Saint Seiya - Heaven Chapter: Overture (2004). Kazama also had a brief career as an AV actress, releasing two adult films between 2010 and 2011. Kazama also had a manga line titled "Shugeki Angel RUMI."

After retiring, Kazama became Shinobu Kandori's public secretary during Kandori's campaign to join the House of Councillors in 2006. In January 2010, she opened a restaurant in Kagurazawa with Eagle Sawai and Makiko Ogawa called "Tonsai Kitchen Kizuna," until it closed its doors in December 2012. In May 2020, she launched her YouTube channel, "Joshi Puroresu no Otomekokoro," where she would interview wrestlers past and present.

== Death ==
Kazama died on September 21, 2021, the age of 55. In her last blog update on September 5, she revealed that she had been in severe pain from endometriosis.

== Filmography ==
=== V-Cinema ===
Silver (directed by Takashi Miike, September 21, 1999)

=== Adult films (AV) ===
Release date	Title	ID	Company
July 8, 2010	Celebrity Madness Debut Rumi Kazama 芸能人 風間ルミ 狂った果熟 DEBUT	SDMT-166	SOD
January 8, 2011	Celebrity Rumi Kazama . Dangerous Pro Wrestler 芸能人 風間ルミ デンジャラスプロレスラー	SDMT-269	SOD

== Championships and accomplishments ==
- All Japan Women's Pro-Wrestling
  - AJW Championship (1 time)
  - WWWA World Tag Team Championship (1 time) – with Takako Inoue
- Ladies Legend Pro-Wrestling
  - LLPW Singles Championship (2 times, final champion)
  - LLPW Six Woman Tag Team Championship (3 times) – with Noriyo Tateno (1 time), Yasha Kurenai (1 time), Eagle Sawai (2 times), Carol Midori (1 time), and Takako Inoue (1 time)
- Tokyo Sports
  - Service Award (2021)
