= Yumiko Hotta =

Japanese professional wrestler and mixed martial artist

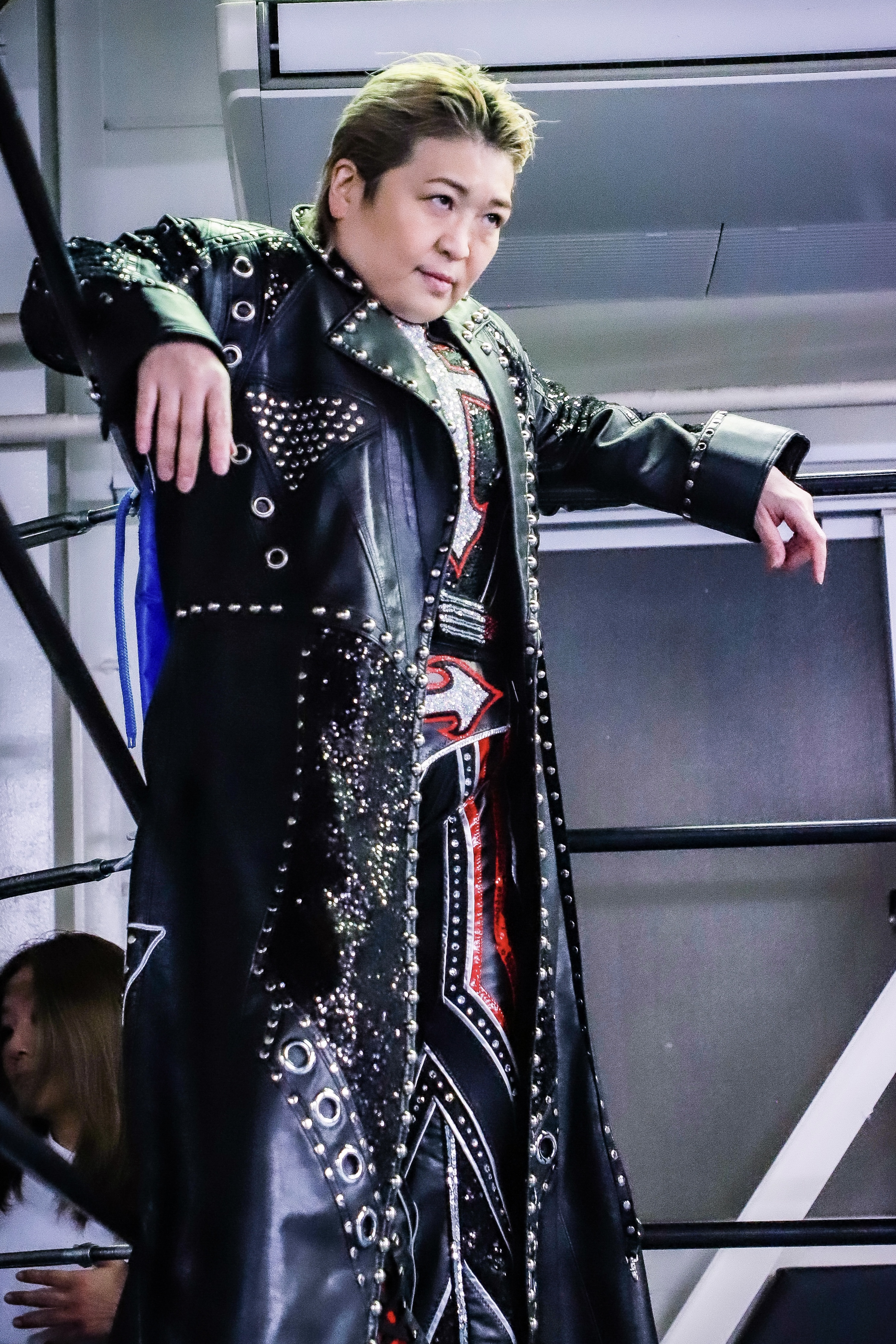
- Hotta in April 2023

Personal information
- Born: Yumiko Hotta; January 10, 1967 (age 59) Kobe, Hyōgo

Professional wrestling career
- Ring name(s): KY Hotta; Passion Hotty; Yumiko Hotta
- Billed height: 1.68 m (5 ft 6 in)
- Billed weight: 72 kg (159 lb)
- Trained by: AJW dojo (professional wrestling); Makoto Nakamura (Kyokushin)
- Debut: June 5, 1985

Yumiko Hotta (堀田 祐美子, Hotta Yumiko; born January 10, 1967) is a Japanese professional wrestler and mixed martial artist. Hotta was trained by and started her career in the All Japan Women's Pro-Wrestling (AJW) promotion in June 1985. She worked for the promotion until 2003, becoming a three-time WWWA World Single and WWWA World Tag Team Champion. In June 2003, Hotta took over the Hyper Visual Fighting Arsion promotion and renamed it Major Girl's Fighting AtoZ. Under Hotta's leadership, the promotion lasted only three years, before folding in 2006, after which Hotta became a freelancer. In January 2011, Hotta joined the new Universal Woman's Pro Wrestling Reina promotion, but just sixteen months later she announced that the promotion was folding. Afterwards, she affiliated herself with the World Woman Pro-Wrestling Diana promotion, becoming the leader of the villainous Bousou-gun stable. She resigned from Diana in July 2016 to once again become a freelancer. Since 1995, Hotta has also fought several mixed martial arts matches, mostly at events put together by joshi puroresu promotions.

== Professional wrestling career ==
=== All Japan Women's Pro-Wrestling (1985–2003) ===
With a sports background in karate, specifically in the Kyokushin kaikan style, Hotta was trained in professional wrestling at the All Japan Women's Pro-Wrestling (AJW) dojo. She was part of the 1985 AJW rookie class alongside Hisako Uno, Suzuka Minami and Mitsuko Nishiwaki. She made her debut on June 5, 1985, teaming with Megumi Nakamae in a tag team match, where they faced Fumie Kanzaki and Hisako Uno. Hotta gained attention early on for her unorthodox wrestling style. During her second year in AJW, Hotta was made the tag team partner of popular wrestler Chigusa Nagayo. On October 10, 1986, Hotta and Nagayo won the 1986 Tag League the Best tournament. She won her first title on April 15, 1987, when she and Hisako Uno defeated Judy Martin and Leilani Kai to win the vacant WWWA World Tag Team Championship. They would lose the title just twelve days later to the Red Typhoons (Kazue Nagahori and Yumi Ogura). The following year, Hotta formed the Fire Jets tag team with Mitsuko Nishiwaki and together the two went on to become two-time WWWA World Tag Team Champions during the late 80s. On September 5, 1993, Hotta and Takako Inoue defeated Akira Hokuto, the former Hisako Uno, and Suzuka Minami to win the vacant UWA World Women's Tag Team Championship, which they would hold for the next seven months. In mid-1994, Hotta won the annual Japan Grand Prix.

Hotta won her first singles title on September 24, 1995, when she defeated Toshiyo Yamada for the All Pacific Championship. She vacated the title in mid-1996 to concentrate on chasing AJW's top singles title, the WWWA World Single Championship, as well as an upcoming vale tudo fight. Having established herself in legit competition, Hotta was on August 20, 1997, booked to defeat Kyoko Inoue at the Nippon Budokan for the WWWA World Single Championship. During the next two years, Hotta went on to win the title two more times. In the late 90s, AJW began having financial issues, which led to a mass exodus of talent from the promotion; Hotta, however, remained loyal to the promotion, becoming a locker room leader of sorts. However, on May 11, 2003, Hotta announced that she also was quitting the dying promotion.

=== Major Girl's Fighting AtoZ (2003–2006) ===
After leaving AJW, Hotta joined the Hyper Visual Fighting Arsion, being joined by fellow AJW workers Mika Nishio and Mima Shimoda and former AJW trainees Chiemi Kitakami and Sachie Abe. On June 24, Hotta became the president of Arsion and changed the promotion's name to Major Girl's Fighting AtoZ. On February 15, 2004, Hotta defeated Momoe Nakanishi to become the second AtoZ World Champion. She held the title until May 4, 2006, when AtoZ went out of business.

=== Freelancing (2006–2011) ===
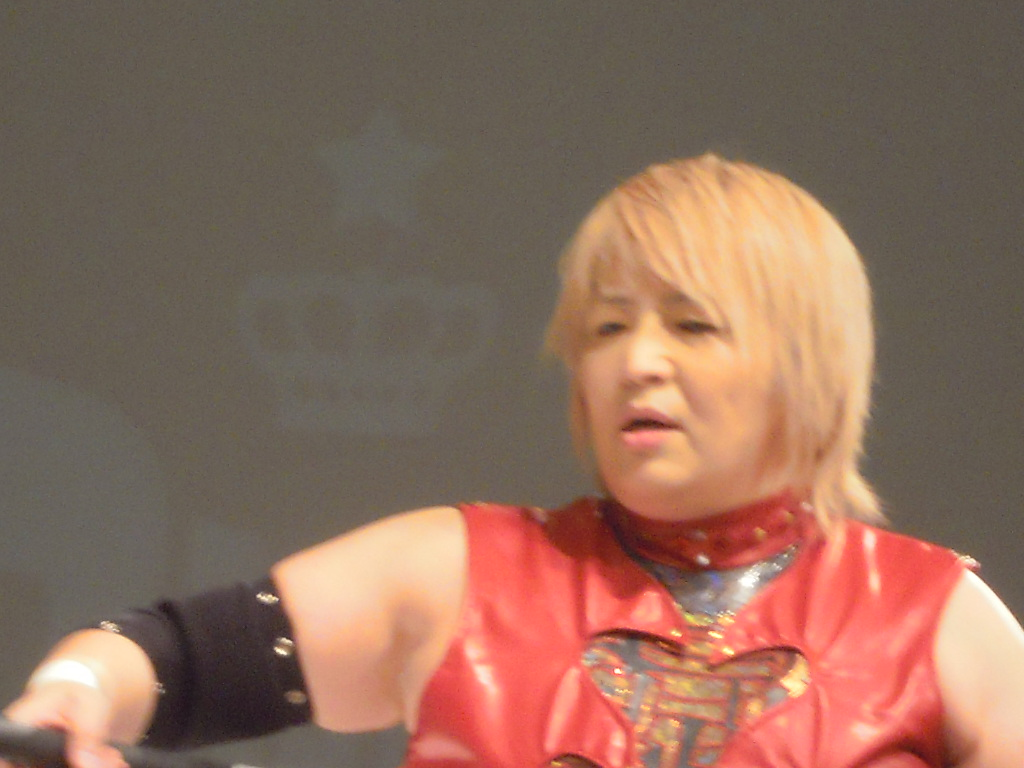
Hotta in November 2010

Following the folding of AtoZ, Hotta began working as a freelancer on the Japanese independent circuit. She made her debut for Ice Ribbon on February 2, 2007, wrestling Hikari Minami to a draw, for NEO Japan Ladies Pro Wrestling on April 2, teaming with Misae Genki to defeat Etsuko Mita and Yoshiko Tamura in a tag team main event, and on October 21, 2007, entered Oz Academy's tournament to determine the number one contender to the promotion's Openweight Championship, from which she was eliminated in the second round on November 23 by Carlos Amano. Hotta also made appearances for Pro Wrestling Sun, under the ring name "KY Hotta".

On July 21, 2008, Hotta made an appearance for JWP Joshi Puroresu, when she and Manami Toyota entered a tournament to determine the inaugural Daily Sports Women's Tag Team Champions, defeating Chikayo Nagashima and Sonoko Kato in their first round match. On August 3, they were defeated in the finals of the tournament by Harukura (Kayoko Haruyama and Tsubasa Kuragaki). On September 23, Hotta also unsuccessfully challenged Haruyama for the JWP Openweight Championship. At the end of the year, the match was named JWP's Match of the Year. On January 25, 2009, Hotta and Keito defeated Uematsu☆Ran (Ran Yu-Yu and Toshie Uematsu) to win the Daily Sports Women's and JWP Tag Team Championships. After a successful title defense against Arisa Nakajima and Toujyuki Leon on February 21, Hotta and Keito lost the titles to Command Bolshoi and Megumi Yabushita in their second defense on April 12.

In 2009, Hotta joined Nanae Takahashi's Passion Red stable, adopting the ring name "Passion Hotty" in the process. She would mainly represent the stable in JWP and Passion Red's self-produced independent events. Passion Red held its final event on November 27, 2010, after which the stable folded.

=== Universal Woman's Pro Wrestling Reina (2011–2012) ===
In early 2011, Hotta joined the newly formed Universal Woman's Pro Wrestling Reina promotion, which had a working relationship with the Mexican Consejo Mundial de Lucha Libre (CMLL) promotion. After several small pre-events, the promotion held its first official event on May 8, where Hotta and Manami Toyota defeated Hailey Hatred and Zeuxis in a tag team match. At the second event seven days later, Hotta and Zeuxis defeated Silueta and Tomoka Nakagawa in a tag team main event. During the third event on May 28, Hotta announced that she had injured the meniscus in her knee and would undergo surgery the following month, forcing her to take a break from in-ring action.

Hotta returned to the ring on August 20, 2011, at Reina 10, where she and Mima Shimoda were defeated in a tag team main event by La Comandante and Dama de Hierro, after Hotta was pinned by La Comandante. Afterwards, Shimoda, a CMLL regular, turned on Hotta and aligned herself with the Mexican opponents. This led to a match on August 27 at Reina 11, where Hotta, Aki Kanbayashi and Saya were defeated by Shimoda, La Comandante and Dama de Hierro. On September 18 at Reina 13, Hotta got her first win over the CMLL opposition, when she and Manami Toyota defeated La Comandante and Zeuxis in a tag team match, with Hotta pinning Zeuxis for the win. Seven days later at Reina 16, Hotta defeated visiting American Sara Del Rey in a main event singles match. On October 27, Hotta captained Team Reina in Sendai Girls' Pro Wrestling's Joshi Puroresu Dantai Taikou Flash tournament, a single-elimination tournament, where different joshi promotions battled each other. In their first round match, Team Reina (Hotta, Aki Kanbayashi, Aoi Ishibashi, La Comandante and Zeuxis) were defeated by Team Stardom (Mayu Iwatani, Natsuki☆Taiyo, Saki Kashima, Yoko Bito and Yoshiko). Three days later at Reina 19, Hotta faced La Comandante in a main event grudge match, winning via submission. Afterwards, La Comandante challenged Hotta to a Lucha de Apuestas Hair vs. Hair match for when she returned to Reina.

On November 23 at Reina 20, Hotta defeated Mexican Lady Apache to win the Radio Nippon Cup and become the inaugural Reina World Women's Champion. Afterwards, Hotta resumed her rivalry with turncoat Mima Shimoda, teaming with Aoi Ishibashi and Manami Toyota in a six-woman tag team match on January 15 at Reina 24, where they defeated Shimoda, Cassandra and Kellie Skater, with Hotta submitting Shimoda for the win. On January 29 at Reina 25, Shimoda came back, teaming with Sahory in a tag team match, where they defeated Hotta and her trainee Saya. On February 25 at Reina 27, Hotta and Saya were again defeated by Shimoda, who this time teamed with Silueta. On May 13 at Reina 33, the promotion's first anniversary event, La Comandante returned to Japan, facing Hotta in a Lucha de Apuestas Hair vs. Hair main event. Hotta won the match via submission, forcing her rival to have her head shaved, but afterwards surprisingly announced that Reina was folding effective immediately. While most of the former Universal Woman's Pro Wrestling Reina roster went on to form the Reina X World promotion, Hotta, along with her trainee Saya, Mima Shimoda and Shuri Okuda broke away from the group.

=== World Woman Pro-Wrestling Diana (2012–2016) ===
On May 22, 2012, Hotta, along with fellow Reina alumni Saya and Shuri Okuda, made a surprise appearance for the World Woman Pro-Wrestling Diana promotion, interrupting a main event battle royal by attacking Kaoru Ito and Sareee. On June 3, Diana announced that Hotta had officially signed with the promotion. The first match of Hotta's storyline rivalry with Diana took place on June 27, when she defeated Keiko Aono in a singles match and afterwards challenged the promotion's top trainee Sareee to a match. The match took place on July 20, when Hotta and Kuro, the newly renamed Saya, defeated Sareee and Keiko Aono in a tag team match. A rematch between the two teams took place on August 5, ending in a no contest, when Aono turned on Sareee and joined forces with Hotta and Kuro. On June 23, Hotta, Kuro and Aono were joined by Yuiga to form the Bousou-gun stable. On October 28, Bousou-gun received its fifth member, when Mask de Sun turned on Kaoru Ito and Diana founder Kyoko Inoue in a six-woman tag team main event, helping Hotta, Aono and Yuiga win the match. On December 31, Hotta returned to Ice Ribbon to take part in RibbonMania 2012, where she wrestled Hamuko Hoshi to a fifteen-minute time limit draw. On January 10, Hotta and Hoshi entered a tournament to determine the inaugural Diana Tag Team Champions, defeating the team of Manami Toyota and Mima Shimoda in their first round match. Eight days later, Hotta and Hoshi were eliminated from the tournament in the semifinals by the team of Kaoru Ito and Tomoko Watanabe, when Hotta was disqualified for the assaulting the referee. On January 28, Hotta and Hoshi finished fourth in the tournament, after Hotta was again disqualified in a third place match against Keiko Aono and Mask de Sun.

On March 10, 2013, Hotta made a special appearance for JWP, teaming with Keiko Aono in a main event tag team match, where they defeated JWP Openweight Champion Arisa Nakajima and Rabbit Miu, with Hotta pinning Nakajima for the win. This led to a No Holds Barred match on April 14, where Hotta unsuccessfully challenged Nakajima for her title. On April 29 at Diana's second anniversary event, Hotta and Keiko Aono defeated Kaoru Ito and Tomoko Watanabe in an "Anything, Always, Anywhere" match for the WWWD Queens Championship, when Arisa Nakajima interfered in the match, revealing herself as Bousou-gun's newest member, and helped her new stablemates win the match. On May 28, Hotta's and Aono's new title was officially renamed the WWWD World Tag Team Championship. Hotta and Aono made their first successful title defense on June 16 against WWWD World Single Champion Kyoko Inoue and Sareee. Their second successful defense took place on August 4, when they defeated Allysin Kay and Crazy Mary. On September 20, Hotta returned to Reina Joshi Puroresu, the former Reina X World, which had undergone another change in management, confronting Syuri after she had been crowned the second Reina World Women's Champion and given the title Hotta had originally held and never lost. Hotta then followed Syuri to her home promotion, attacking her at a Wrestling New Classic (WNC) event on September 29. Hotta wrestled her first match with Syuri in what was also her Reina return match on October 4, when she, Keiko Aono and Yuiga were defeated by Syuri, La Vaquerita and Zeuxis via disqualification. During the match, Mima Shimoda, who had recently turned on Kyoko Inoue, was revealed as the newest member of Bousou-gun. On October 31, Hotta unsuccessfully challenged Syuri at a WNC event for both the Reina World Women's Championship and the WNC Women's Championship. On December 15, Hotta and Aono lost the WWWD World Tag Team Championship to Kyoko Inoue and Tomoko Watanabe in their third title defense.

On January 4, 2014, Hotta produced her own Diana event, which featured a tag team main event, where she and Arisa Nakajima faced Kyoko Inoue and La Comandante. The match ended in a disqualification, when Hotta attacked the referee, after La Comandante had turned on Inoue and joined Bousou-gun. The rivalry between Hotta's Bousou-gun and Kyoko Inoue's Seikigun culminated on April 29 at Diana's third anniversary event, where Hotta and Mask de Sun defeated Inoue and Tomoko Watanabe in a steel cage deathmatch. Post-match, Kaoru made her Diana debut, forming a new stable with Mima Shimoda and Takako Inoue and turning the rivalry between Bousou-gun and Seikigun into a three-way war. On June 29, Hotta and La Comandante defeated Aki Shizuku and Ariya to win the Reina World Tag Team Championship. They made their first successful title defense on July 31 against Makoto and Ray. They lost the title to Makoto and Ariya and in their second defense on August 20. Hotta finished her year on December 23 by taking part in the first women's "No Rope Barbed Wire Current Blast Deathmatch" in 17 years, where she was defeated by Kyoko Inoue.

On August 16, 2015, Hotta teamed up with Kyoko Inoue to defeat Manami Toyota and Mima Shimoda for the vacant WWWD World Tag Team Championship. However, immediately afterwards, Hotta gave up the title in favor of joining Jaguar Yokota's new Crysis stable, which also included Jenny Rose and male wrestlers "brother" Yasshi and Taru.

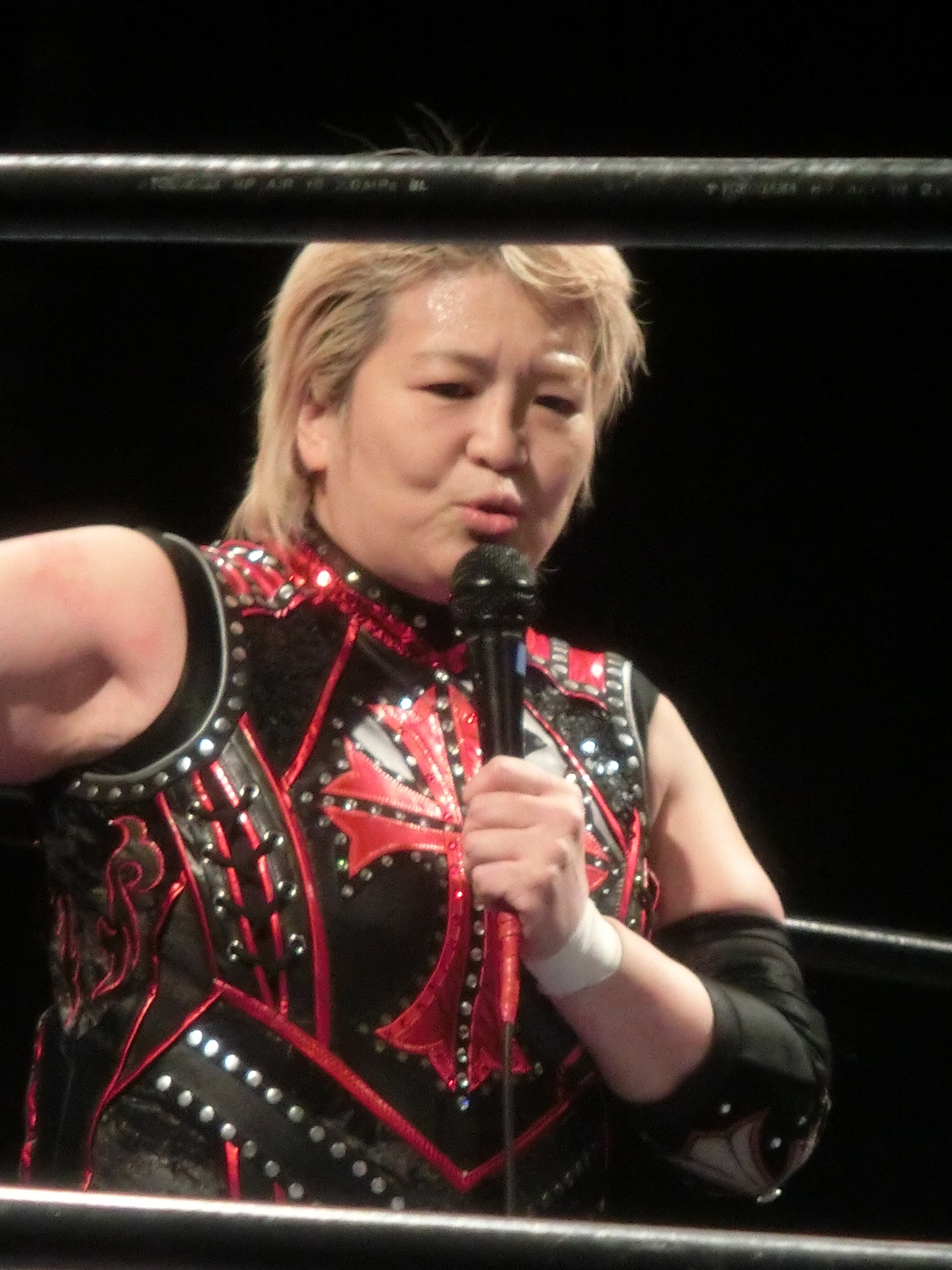
Hotta in February 2018

On July 11, 2016, Hotta was announced as the head of the women's wrestling department of Atsushi Onita's new Fire Puroresu promotion, which would hold its first show on August 26. On July 28, Hotta announced her resignation from Diana, stating that going forward she would once again work as a freelancer. On August 7, 2016, Hotta was appointed as an advisor to Actwres girl'Z.

== Mixed martial arts career ==
In 1994, Hotta began practising mixed martial arts and qualified for the Ultimate L-1 Tournament, held by joshi puroresu promotion Ladies Legend Pro-Wrestling (LLPW) on July 18, 1995. After defeating Mizuki Endo via technical knockout in her first round match, Hotta was submitted in the semifinals by Svetlana Goundarenko. On July 7, 1996, Hotta defeated Margot Neyhoft via submission at Vale Tudo Japan 1996. On August 13, Hotta entered an MMA tournament held by AJW. After submission wins over Valerie Wiet and Lioness Asuka, she was defeated in the finals via submission by Irina Rodina.

On February 18, 2012, Hotta fought her first MMA match in over eleven years, when she faced Amanda Lucas in a match to determine the Deep Women's Openweight Champion. Hotta lost the match, submitting to a keylock at 2:16 in the third round. On December 22, 2016, it was announced that Hotta would replace an injured Shinobu Kandori and take on Gabi Garcia at Rizin Fighting Federation's New Year's Eve show. Hotta lost the fight via technical knockout in 41 seconds.

== Championships and accomplishments ==
- All Japan Women's Pro-Wrestling
  - All Pacific Championship (1 time)
  - UWA World Women's Tag Team Championship (1 time) – with Takako Inoue
  - WWWA World Single Championship (3 times)
  - WWWA World Tag Team Championship (3 times) – with Hisako Uno (1) and Mitsuko Nishiwaki (2)
  - Japan Grand Prix (1994)
  - Tag League the Best (1986) – with Chigusa Nagayo
  - Tag League the Best (1997) – with Kaoru Ito
  - Tag League the Best (2001) – with Manami Toyota
- JWP Joshi Puroresu
  - Daily Sports Women's Tag Team Championship (1 time) – with Keito
  - JWP Tag Team Championship (1 time) – with Keito
  - JWP Year-End Award (1 time)
    - Best Bout Award (2008) vs. Kayoko Haruyama on September 23
- Major Girl's Fighting AtoZ
  - AtoZ World Championship (1 time)
- Universal Woman's Pro Wrestling Reina / Reina Joshi Puroresu
  - Reina World Tag Team Championship (1 time) – with La Comandante
  - Reina World Women's Championship (1 time)
  - Radio Nippon Cup (2012)
- World Woman Pro-Wrestling Diana
  - WWWD Queens Championship / WWWD World Tag Team Championship (2 times) – with Keiko Aono (1) and Kyoko Inoue (1)

== Mixed martial arts record ==
Professional record breakdown
10 matches	5 wins	5 losses
By knockout	1	1
By submission	4	4

Res.	Record	Opponent	Method	Event	Date	Round	Time	Location	Notes
Loss	5–5	Gabi Garcia	TKO (punches)	Rizin 4: Rizin Fighting World Grand Prix 2016: Final Round	December 31, 2016	1	0:41	Saitama, Japan	
Loss	5–4	Amanda Lucas	Submission (americana)	Deep: 57 Impact	February 18, 2012	3	2:16	Tokyo, Japan	For the Deep Women's Openweight Championship.
Loss	5–3	Shinobu Kandori	Submission (armbar)	LLPW: L-1 2000: The Strongest Lady	November 22, 2000	1	7:50	Tokyo, Japan	
Win	5–2	Angel Amoroso	Submission	LLPW: Ultimate L-1 Challenge	October 10, 1998	1	1:09	Tokyo, Japan	
Loss	4–2	Irina Rodina	Submission (armbar)	AJW: U-Top Tournament Finals	August 13, 1996	1	3:11	Tokyo, Japan	
Win	4–1	Tomoko Kitamura	Submission (americana)	AJW: U-Top Tournament Finals	August 13, 1996	1	3:11	Tokyo, Japan	
Win	3–1	Valérie Hénin	Submission (americana)	AJW: U-Top Tournament Opening Round	August 12, 1996	1	6:05	Tokyo, Japan	
Win	2–1	Margot Neyhoft	Submission (americana)	Vale Tudo Japan 1996	July 7, 1996	2	4:14	Urayasu, Japan	
Loss	1–1	Svetlana Goundarenko	Submission (neck crank)	LLPW: Ultimate L-1 Tournament	July 18, 1995	1	1:17	Tokyo, Japan	
Win	1–0	Mizuki Endo	TKO (corner stoppage)	LLPW: Ultimate L-1 Tournament	July 18, 1995	1	12:20	Tokyo, Japan	

Winner (wager)	Loser (wager)	Location	Event	Date	Notes
Kaoru Ito (hair)	Yumiko Hotta (hair)	Kawasaki, Kanagawa, Japan	AJW Winning Hit ~ The Year-End Big Rumble ~	December 16, 2001	
Yumiko Hotta (hair)	La Comandante (hair)	Tokyo, Japan	Reina 33	May 13, 2012	
