= Japan Women's Pro-Wrestling =

Japanese women's professional wrestling promotion

- Acronym: JWP
- Founded: 1986
- Defunct: 1992
- Style: Joshi puroresu
- Headquarters: Japan
- Successor: Ladies Legend Pro-Wrestling; JWP Joshi Puroresu

Japan Women's Pro-Wrestling; (In Japanese: ジャパン女子プロレス, also known as Original JWP) was a joshi puroresu (women's professional wrestling) promotion established in 1988. The first event took place on August 17, 1986.

== History ==
All Japan Women's Pro-Wrestling was the only women's professional wrestling promotion prior to 1986. All Japan Women's was experiencing a boom period due to the Crush Gals of Lioness Asuka and Chigusa Nagayo as was Onyanko Club, a Japanese idol music group. Japan Women's Pro-Wrestling was imagined to be a wrestling version of Onyanko Club.

All Japan Women's had strict rules, including what became known as "the three no's" of no drinking, no smoking and no boys, along with a rule that all wrestlers must retire once reaching the age of 25 years old. Japan Women's Pro-Wrestling countered this by having no such rules and due to this were able to recruit Jackie Sato, who was a top All Japan Women's star that was forced to retire at the age of 25.

The promotion also was able to recruit Shinobu Kandori, a judoka who had captured the bronze medal at the 1984 World Judo Championships and Nancy Kumi, a former All Japan Women's wrestler. Gran Hamada and Atsushi Onita also joined as coaches.

Japan Women's Wrestling had their first show on August 17, 1986. Antonio Inoki and Minako Honda, a famous Japanese idol appeared. This show was notable for featuring the debut of future stars such as Mayumi Ozaki, Dynamite Kansai, Cutie Suzuki and Rumi Kazama along with the main event being Jackie Sato's return from retirement as she faced Shinobu Kandori. Suzuki and Kazama became idol's through music and television, with Kazama appearing in Japan's version of Penthouse.

The promotion started to fracture on July 6, 1987, when Sato hit the injured eye of Kandori. The two exchanged words and on July 18, 1987, a match between the two turned into a shoot, which became an infamous incident. In October 1987, Kandori, who had become a free agent due to the incident, appeared at an All Japan Women's show to challenge Yukari Omori. She attempted to join All Japan Women's, but was prevented from doing so due to contractual disputes and eventually returned to Japan Women's Pro-Wrestling. Jackie Sato retired on March 20, 1988.

The promotion officially closed on January 26, 1992 and split into two groups: Ladies Legend Pro-Wrestling which featured Shinobu Kandori, Rumi Kazama, Harley Saito and others while JWP formed with Mayumi Ozaki, Dynamite Kansai, Cutie Suzuki and others.

== Titles ==
Championship	Final champion(s)	Date won
UWA World Women's Championship	Miss Janeth	2002
UWA Women's International Title	Harley Saito	February 11, 1991
Pacific Coast Tag Team Championship	Miss A and Harley Saito	October 10, 1990
UWA & JWP Women's Junior Title	Cutie Suzuki	October 10, 1991

== Alumni ==
- Jackie Sato
- Shinobu Kandori
- Nancy Kumi
- Mayumi Ozaki
- Plum Mariko
- Rumi Kazama
- Eagle Sawai
- Dynamite Kansai
- Esther Moreno
- Xóchitl Hamada
- Cutie Suzuki
- Harley Saito
- Utako Hozumi

== See also ==
- Puroresu
