= Keiko Aono =

Japanese professional wrestler

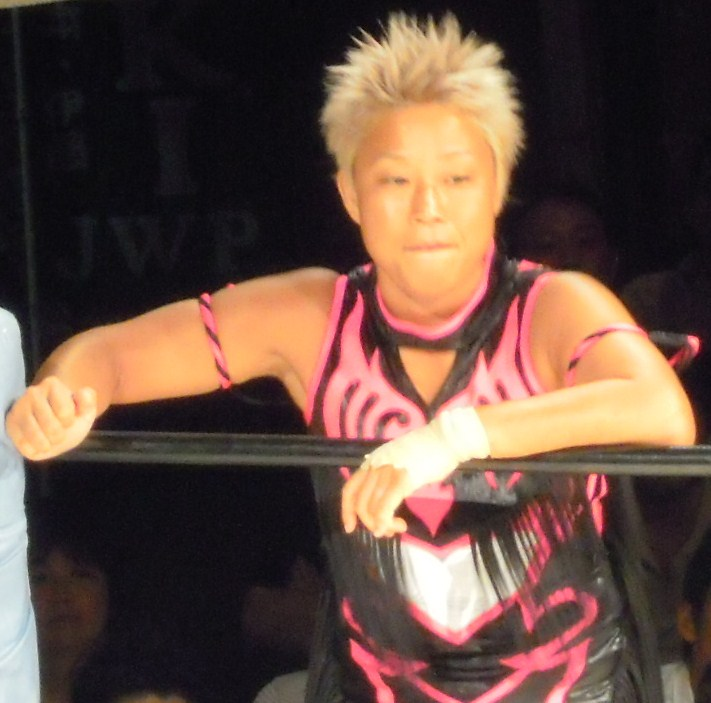
- Aono in August 2010

Personal information
- Born: April 8, 1973 (age 53) Kadoma, Japan

Professional wrestling career
- Ring name(s): ECO; Haruyama #5; Keiko Aono; Keito; Santa ECO; Santa Keito
- Billed height: 163 cm (5 ft 4 in)
- Billed weight: 70 kg (154 lb)
- Debut: 1996
- Retired: 2018

Keiko Aono (青野敬子, Aono Keiko) is a Japanese retired professional wrestler best known for her tenure with the defunct Japanese promotions JWP Joshi Puroresu, Ladies Legend Pro-Wrestling and World Woman Pro-Wrestling Diana.

== Professional wrestling career ==
=== Ladies Legend Pro-Wrestling (1996–2002) ===
Aono shared a six-year tenure with Ladies Legend Pro-Wrestling.

==== All Japan Women's Pro Wrestling (1996–2001) ====
Due to LLPW holding various partnerships with many of the promotions from the Japanese independent scene, Aono briefly competed in All Japan Women's Pro-Wrestling. She made her first appearance in the promotion at AJW Women's Pro-Wrestling Dream Future on May 18, 1996, where she teamed up with Sayuri Okino in a losing effort against Chihiro Nakano and Makie Numao. At AJPW/LLPW a cross-over event promoted on March 10, 1999, Aono teamed up with Megumi Sato to unsuccessfully challenge Kayo Noumi and Miho Wakizawa for the AJW Tag Team Championship. At AJW Odaiba W Explosion on July 11, 1999, she unsuccessfully challenged Kumiko Maekawa for the All Pacific Championship.

=== Wrestle Association R (1995–2000) ===
Aono competed as a female talent in Wrestle Association R. She made her first appearance at WAR LIVE-WAR-RISE '95 on June 2, 1995, where she teamed up with Jen Yukari in a losing effort against Eagle Sawai and Michiko Omukai. She competed in several of the promotion's notable events such as WAR 8 Years Later Anniversary from July 13, 2000, where she teamed up with Shinobu Kandori to defeat Harley Saito and Noriyo Tateno.

=== JWP Joshi Puroresu (2004–2016) ===
Aono evolved in JWP Joshi Puroresu regularly between 2004 and 2011, and part time until 2016. She is a former JWP Tag Team Champion and Daily Sports Women's Tag Team Champion, titles which she won and defended together at JWP Osaka Pure Fire !! 2 on January 25, 2009, by teaming up with long-time tag team partner Yumiko Hotta by defeating Ran Yu-Yu and Toshie Uematsu. She competed in various of the promotion's signature event such as the Natsu Onna Kettei Tournament, making her first appearance at the first-ever edition of the tournament from 2009 where she fell short to Toshie Uematsu in the first rounds. At the 2010, edition, she teamed up wirth Asami Kawasaki in a losing effort against Kagetsu and Leon in the first rounds. Aono competed in various other notable events such as the JWP Leon Produce ~ Leon 10th Anniversary from May 16, 2010, where she fought in a battle royal won by Mima Shimoda and also involving Command Bolshoi, Kazuki, Kaori Yoneyama, Sachie Abe, Sawako Shimono, Gami and many others.

=== World Woman Pro-Wrestling Diana (2011–2018) ===
Aono spent seven years competing in World Woman Pro-Wrestling Diana. During her time in the promotion, she chased for various championships promoted by it. She is a former World Woman Pro-Wrestling Diana Tag Team Champion, title which she won alongside Yumiko Hotta by defeating Kaoru Ito and Tomoko Watanabe at Diana 2nd Anniversary on April 24, 2013. At a house show promoted on December 18, 2016, she unsuccessfully challenged reigning champion Jaguar Yokota and Mima Shimoda for the World Woman Pro-Wrestling Diana Queen Elizabeth Championship, title contested for only in three-way matches. She previously reached the world title scene as she unsuccessfully challenged Kaoru Ito for the World Woman Pro-Wrestling Diana World Championship at a house show from July 26, 2015. Aono competed in events produced for herself such as the Diana Keiko Aono 20th Anniversary from February 9, 2014, where she gauntlet match won by Alexander Otsuka and also involving Aliya, Megumi Yabushita, Kayoko Haruyama, Madoka and others.

Aono retired from professional wrestling at Diana Kyoko Inoue 30th Anniversary on October 7, 2018, where she fell short to Chikayo Nagashima in singles competition.

==== Independent scene (2011–2018) ====
While competing as part of Diana's roster, Aono often evolved in the Japanese independent scene due to the latter promotion's partnerships. At Sendai Girls Dantai Taikou Flash Tournament, an event promoted by Sendai Girls' Pro Wrestling on October 27, 2011, she teamed up with Diana promotion mates Annie Social, Jenny Rose, Kaoru Ito and Kyoko Inoue to defeat Team Freelance (Jaguar Yokota, Manami Toyota, Mio Shirai, Nancy Mari and Sakura Hirota). At PURE-J Chase The Chance Vol. 4, an event promoted by Pure-J on September 30, 2018, she teamed up with Rydeen Hagane in a losing effort against Manami Katsu and Saki. At BJW BJ-Style #20, an event promoted by Big Japan Pro Wrestling on September 17, 2018, Aono fell short to Kyoko Inoue in singles competition. On one of Pro Wrestling Zero1's 2017 Tenkaichi Jr. festival nights from April 10, Aono competed as a female talent as she teamed up with Inoue in a losing effort against Aja Kong and Hiroyo Matsumoto.

== Championships and accomplishments ==
- JWP Joshi Puroresu
  - Daily Sports Women's Tag Team Championship (1 time) – with Yumiko Hotta
  - JWP Tag Team Championship (1 time) – with Yumiko Hotta
- Ladies Legend Pro-Wrestling
  - LLPW 6-Woman Tag Team Championship (2 times) – with Harley Saito and Noriyo Tateno (1), and Mizuki Endo and Reiko Amano (1)
- World Woman Pro-Wrestling Diana
  - World Woman Pro-Wrestling Diana Tag Team Championship (1 time) – with Yumiko Hotta
