= WWWA World Martial Arts Championship =

Professional wrestling women's championship

Details
- Promotion: All Japan Women's Pro-Wrestling (AJWPW)
- Date established: 1987
Statistics
- First champion: Bat Yoshinaga
- Most reigns: All champions (1 reign)

The WWWA World Martial Arts Championship was a secondary women's professional wrestling title in All Japan Women's Pro-Wrestling in the 1990s. This title was contested under kickboxing rules.

== Title history ==
Key
No.	Overall reign number
Reign	Reign number for the specific champion
Days	Number of days held

No.	Champion	Championship change			Reign statistics		Notes	Ref.
No.	Champion	Date	Event	Location	Reign	Days	Notes	Ref.
1	Bat Yoshinaga	March 17, 1991	Live Event	Tokyo, Japan	1	1,302	Yoshinaga defeated Kaoru Ito to become inaugural champion.	
—	Vacated	October 9, 1994	—	—	—	—	Yoshinaga retires and vacates the championship.	
2	Fumiko Ishimoto	March 21, 1995	Wrestling Queendom – Success	Osaka, Japan	1	(Note: The length of the championship reign is too uncertain to calculate.)	Ishimoto defeated Kumiko Maekawa to win the vacant championship.	
—	Deactivated	1995	—	—	—	—	The MMA-Division of AJW was discontinued due to lack of competition and the title de facto abandoned.	

== See also ==
- List of professional wrestling promotions in Japan
- List of women's wrestling promotions
- Professional wrestling in Japan
