= Harley Saito =

Personal information
- Born: Sayori Saito; December 21, 1967 Yaizu, Shizuoka, Japan
- Died: December 15, 2016 (aged 48) Hiroshima, Hiroshima

Professional wrestling career
- Ring name(s): Harley Saito; Halley Saito; Karula
- Billed height: 1.66 m (5 ft 5 in)
- Billed weight: 67 kg (148 lb)
- Trained by: Nancy Kumi
- Debut: August 17, 1986
- Retired: December 29, 2012

Sayori Saito (斉藤 さより, Saitō Sayori; December 21, 1967 – December 15, 2016) was a Japanese professional wrestler, who performed under the ring name Harley Saito (ハーレー斉藤, Hārē Saitō). She spent much of her career for Ladies Legend Pro-Wrestling.

== Professional wrestling career ==
Trained by Nancy Kumi at the JWP Joshi Puroresu Dojo, Sayori Saito mader her debut for JWP in 1986, adopting the name Halley, from Halley's Comet. In March 1987, she wrestled a show for New Japan Pro-Wrestling, losing to Miss A. During that time, she changed her ring name to Harley, from Harley-Davidson motorcycles. She avenged the loss in April 1988 at the Ikki Kajiwara Memorial Show. In 1992, she went overseas to the United States, wrestling for the Ladies Professional Wrestling Association. While in the LPWA, she defeated Denise Storm in the finals of a tournament to determine the first LPWA Japanese Champion. She was the first and only champion, as the LPWA folded later that year.

Upon returning to Japan, she joined the exodus from JWP to form Ladies Legend Pro-Wrestling. She would occasionally wrestle under the masked alter-ego, Karula. In November 1995, she won the LLPW Singles Championship, defeating Eagle Sawai. She would hold onto the title for nearly a year, before losing it back to Eagle Sawai in October 1996. In April 1995, she fought in a "UFC rules match" at event The Bridge of Dream, losing to Shinobu Kandori in 1:11 by ground and pound. In April 1999, she won the LLPW Six-Woman Tag Team Championship with Noriyo Tateno and Keiko Aono, defeating Eagle Sawai and her partners Shark Tsuchiya and Lioness Asuka. Four months later, she became a double champion, winning her second LLPW Singles title, defeating Shinobu Kandori. Her eight-month run as six-woman tag team champion ended, as she, Tateno, and Aono lost the titles to Rumi Kazama, Carol Midori, and Eagle Sawai. After that, she focused on her reign as Singles champion, which lasted nearly a year, before losing the title to Eagle Sawai in August 2000.

Saito remained a constant staple for LLPW, while also occasionally wrestling for other promotions such as All Japan Women's Pro Wrestling, Frontier Martial-Arts Wrestling, World Entertainment Wrestling, Arsion, Oz Academy, and Pro Wrestling Wave

In 2010, after wrestling at Noriyo Tateno's retirement match, Saito was diagnosed with uterine fibroids. After surgery and two years recovering, Saito wrestled her retirement match on December 29, 2012, teaming with Shinobu Kandori and Mayumi Ozaki, defeating Mizuki Endo, Gami, and Command Bolshoi in a six-woman tag team match.

== Retirement and death ==
After retirement, Saito went into food management.

In 2016, Saito was diagnosed with esophageal cancer. She died on December 15, 2016, just six days shy of her 49th birthday.

== Championships and accomplishments ==
- Ladies Legend Pro-Wrestling
  - LLPW Singles Championship (2 times)
  - LLPW Six-Woman Tag Team Championship (1 time) – with Noriyo Tateno and Keiko Aono
- Ladies Professional Wrestling Association
  - LPWA Japanese Championship (1 time)
  - LPWA Japanese Championship Tournament (1992)
- Universal Wrestling Association
  - UWA Women's International Championship (1 time)
