= WWWA World Midget's Championship =

Professional wrestling midget championship

Details
- Promotion: All Japan Women's Pro-Wrestling
- Date established: 1970
- Date retired: August 27, 2002
Statistics
- First champion: Pretty Atom
- Final champion: Little Frankie
- Most reigns: Little Frankie (3 reigns)

The WWWA World Midget's Championship was a Midget wrestling singles title promoted by Professional wrestling promotion All Japan Women's Pro-Wrestling.

== Title history ==
Key
No.	Overall reign number
Reign	Reign number for the specific champion
Days	Number of days held

No.	Champion	Championship change			Reign statistics		Notes	Ref.
No.	Champion	Date	Event	Location	Reign	Days	Notes	Ref.
1	Pretty Atom	1970	N/A	Zapopan, Jalisco, Mexico	1	(Note: The length of the championship reign is too uncertain to calculate.)	Atom was the inaugural champion; The championship became vacant and inactive in 1980 after Atom's retirement.	
—	Vacated	1980	—	—	—	—	The championship was vacated after Pretty Atom retired.	
2	Little Frankie	August 22, 1993	Summer Spectacular	Nishinomiya, Hyōgo, Japan	1	1,717	Frankie defeated Hitoshi (Tomezo) Tsunokake to win the vacant championship. Frankie defeated the CMLL world champion Enanito Fili Estrella on June 5, 1995 in Tokyo to become the inaugural WMA Unified World Midgets champion.	
3	Tomezo Tsunokake	May 5, 1998	N/A	Tokyo, Japan	1	133		
4	Little Frankie	September 15, 1998	N/A	Tokyo, Japan	2	810		
5	Mr. Buddha Man	December 3, 2000	N/A	Tokyo, Japan	1	87		
6	Tomezo Tsunokake	February 28, 2001	AJW on Fuji TV	Tokyo, Japan	2	424	Tsunokake defeated Hiroshi Sorimachi, Buttaman doing a parody of a famous actor Takashi Sorimachi.	
—	Vacated	April 28, 2002	—	—	—	—	The championship was vacated after Tomezo Tsunokake retired.	
7	Little Frankie	August 27, 2002	N/A	Tokyo, Japan	3	8,697+	Frankie was awarded as the permanent champion after his passing on August 15, 2002.	

== See also ==
- Midgets' World Championship
- CMLL World Mini-Estrella Championship
- AAA World Mini-Estrella Championship
- Mini-Estrella
