= Shinobu Kandori =

Japanese politician and professional wrestler

- 神取 忍
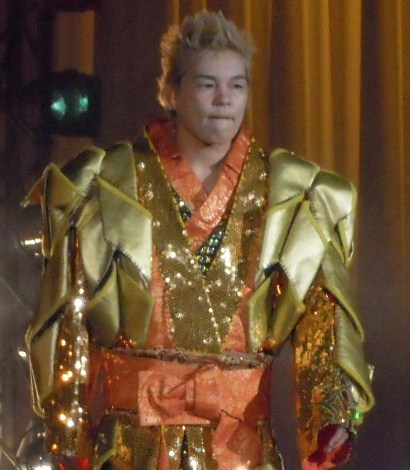
- Kandori in 2011

Member of the House of Councillors
- In office 4 October 2006 – 25 July 2010
- Preceded by: Heizō Takenaka
- Succeeded by: Multi-member district
- Constituency: National PR

Personal details
- Born: 30 October 1964 (age 61) Yokohama, Kanagawa, Japan
- Party: Liberal Democratic
- Professional wrestling career
- Billed height: 1.70 m (5 ft 7 in)
- Billed weight: 75 kg (165 lb)
- Trained by: Kotetsu Yamamoto
- Debut: 1986

Shinobu Kandori
Medal record

Representing Japan

Women's judo

World Championships
| Bronze medal – third place | 1984 Vienna | -66 kg |

Shinobu Kandori (神取 忍, Kandori Shinobu; born October 30, 1964) is a Japanese politician, professional wrestler and retired judoka. She serves as a member of the House of Councillors, representing the Liberal Democratic Party. A native of Yokohama, Kanagawa, she ran unsuccessfully for the House of Councillors in 2004 but was allowed to join the house in 2006 when Heizo Takenaka, a member of the house, resigned.

As a professional wrestler she worked for several women's promotions from the 1980s to the 2000s, including Japan Women's Pro-Wrestling and its offshoot, Ladies' Legend Pro-Wrestling (LLPW), of which she became the president in 2002. She held several championships, including the LLPW Singles Championship in 1993 and 1997, and the WWWA World Single Championship in 1998.

During her career, Kandori also had some hardcore matches. On March 14, 1997, Kandori had a bloody deathmatch, where the ring ropes were replaced with barbed wire, against Megumi Kudo in FMW.

== Judo ==
Kandori captured the bronze medal at the 1984 World Judo Championships. She later planned to compete at the 1988 Summer Olympics, but halfway to the Olympics she lost motivation for judo competition. Kandori considered becoming a trainer, but she became interested in professional wrestling, and eventually retired from judo in order to pursue a pro wrestling career.

== Professional wrestling career ==
=== Japan Women's Pro Wrestling (1986–1987) ===
Kandori joined the recently established Japan Women's Pro-Wrestling in 1986. Before the time of her debut, she trained under Kotetsu Yamamoto and Yoshiaki Fujiwara in the New Japan Pro-Wrestling dojo, where she got to spar with male wrestlers thanks to her athleticism and skill. Riding on her background as a judo medalist, she adopted the gimmick of an arrogant martial artist, stating in an interview that she hated professional wrestling and that she could defeat the renowned Dump Matsumoto in ten seconds. Although Matsumoto was the star heel in rival promotion All Japan Women's Pro-Wrestling, Kandori turned into an even more antagonistic character in JPW, setting her as an outsider who opposed heels and faces alike. Kandori ultimately debuted in the promotion on August 17, 1986 in a spirited losing effort against Jackie Sato.

With her popularity quickly rising, Kandori came to be considered one of JWP's shitenno along with Sato, Rumi Kazama and Nancy Kumi. Her real life relationship with Sato, however, would sour after Sato gave Kandori a real eye injury during a practice. In a match on July 6, 1987, Sato went off script and legitimately attacked Kandori, hitting repeatedly her still healing eye, without being warned or punished by the promotion afterwards. The situation finally exploded in an infamous incident on July 18, 1987, when a mutually agreed-upon shoot wrestling match ended with Kandori punching Sato several times and putting her in real armlocks, inflicting an injury that led to Sato's retirement. The incident angered organized crime members, who attempted to kidnap Kandori after the event; she escaped with the help of a coworker.

Kandori moved temporally to the United States and intended to retire too, but she was convinced to return by professional wrestling journalist Makiko Ida. By Ida's suggestion, Kandori pushed for a high level match against Chigusa Nagayo, the star of All Japan Women's Pro-Wrestling. However, All Japan required Kandori to be free from her JWP contract, which she failed to secure, causing the match to be cancelled.

=== Ladies Legend Pro Wrestling (1993–present) ===
Kandori made her debut for Ladies Legend Pro-Wrestling on January 15, 1993 by teaming up with Mikiko Futagami and losing to Eagle Sawai and Harley Saito. For the first couple of months, Kandori would mostly compete in tag team matches with Rumi Kazama, Miki Handa and Harley Saito. On August 29, Kandori defeated Harley Saito in the semi-final of the LLPW Singles Championship Tournament and went on to defeat Eagle Sawai in the finals to become the LLPW Singles Champion. Kandori defended the championship twice against Eagle Sawai and eventually lost it to Noriyo Tateno on September 23, 1994.

Kandori continued to wrestle for LLPW for the next few years with nothing of any note happening until June 20, 1996, when she teamed up with Karula and Rumi Kazama to lose to Carol Midori, Mikiko Futagami and Yasha Kurenai for the vacant LLPW Tag Team Championship. On November 8, 1997, Kandori defeated Eagle Sawai for her second LLPW Single Championship. On March 21, 1998, Kandori defeated Yumiko Hotta to become the WWWA World Single Champion and held the title for almost a year before losing it back to Hotta on March 10, 1999. Later in the year, Kandori lost the LLPW Single Championship to Harley Saito. In 2002, Kandori became the president of Ladies Legend Pro Wrestling. On January 25, 2004, Kandori and Takako Inoue defeated Amazing Kong and Eagle Sawai to become the LLPW Tag Team Champions and lost the titles on May 30 to Eiger and Sayuri Okino.

== Mixed martial arts career ==
=== Ladies Legend Pro Wrestling ===
As a former judo medalist, Kandori made her debut in the mixed martial arts as part of the Ultimate L-1 Tournament promoted by LLPW in 1995. She first faced kickboxer Liz Africano in the first round and defeated her with ease, taking her down and locking a rear naked choke on her overwhelmed opponent. Kandori then advanced to the second round, where she fought wrestler Fieni Klee. Although Klee sprawled to a takedown attempt and locked a guillotine choke, Shinobu was able to escape and take her back, winning by rear naked choke again. At the finals, Kandori's last opponent would be multiple judo medalist Svetlana Goundarenko, who outweighed Kandori by 100 lbs. Goundarenko pressed Shinobu against the fence to avoid her striking and attempted a hip throw, but Kandori blocked it. After a brief punch combo by Kandori, however, Svetlana finally took Shinobu down and overpowered her, locking a neck crank and making Kandori tap out.

In 1998, Kandori fought a rematch against Goundarenko, again in a LLPW event. Cornered by former sumo champion Koji Kitao, Shinobu showed an improved submission defense, while her opponent fought more cautiously. Goundarenko threw Shinobu with ura nage and tried to smother her from the back, but the pro wrestler escaped. Then, blocking a hip throw and a kata guruma attempt, Kandori took her back and closed a guillotine choke, forcing Goundarenko into submission for the win.

=== Rizin ===
Kandori was expected to face Gabi Garcia on December 31, 2016, at Rizin Fighting Federation's year-end show in Saitama, Japan. However, a rib injury forced her to pull out of the fight. She was replaced by Yumiko Hotta. Kandori was set to face Garcia again on December 31, 2017, but this time the fight was canceled due to Garcia missing weight by 28 pounds (13 kg).

== Championships and accomplishments ==
=== Judo ===
- World Judo Championships
  - 1984 World Judo Championships Bronze Medalist

=== Professional wrestling ===
- All Japan Women's Pro-Wrestling
  - WWWA World Single Championship (1 time)
- Japan Women's Pro-Wrestling
  - Pacific Coast Tag Team Championship (1 time) – with Rumi Kazama
  - UWA World Women's Championship
- Ladies Legend Pro-Wrestling
  - LLPW Singles Championship (2 times)
  - LLPW Tag Team Championship (1 time) – with Takako Inoue
- Tokyo Sports
  - Joshi Puroresu Grand Prize (1995, 1998)
- Universal Wrestling Association
  - UWA World Women's Championship (1 time)

== Mixed martial arts record ==
Professional record breakdown
| 5 matches | 4 wins | 1 loss |
| By knockout | 0 | 0 |
| By submission | 4 | 1 |
| By decision | 0 | 0 |

| Res. | Record | Opponent | Method | Event | Date | Round | Time | Location | Notes |
|---|---|---|---|---|---|---|---|---|---|
| Win | 4-1 | Yumiko Hotta | Submission (armbar) | LLPW - L-1 2000: The Strongest Lady | November 22, 2000 | 1 | 7:50 | Tokyo, Japan | |
| Win | 3-1 | Svetlana Goundarenko | Submission (guillotine choke) | LLPW - Ultimate L-1 Challenge | October 10, 1998 | 1 | 4:08 | Tokyo, Japan | |
| Loss | 2-1 | Svetlana Goundarenko | Submission (neck crank) | LLPW - Ultimate L-1 Tournament | July 18, 1995 | 1 | 5:55 | Tokyo, Japan | |
| Win | 2-0 | Fieni Klee | Submission (rear naked choke) | LLPW - Ultimate L-1 Tournament | July 18, 1995 | 1 | 0:56 | Tokyo, Japan | |
| Win | 1-0 | Liz Africano | Submission (rear naked choke) | LLPW - Ultimate L-1 Tournament | July 18, 1995 | 1 | 0:42 | Tokyo, Japan | |
