= Ladies Legend Pro-Wrestling =

Professional wrestling promoter based in Japan

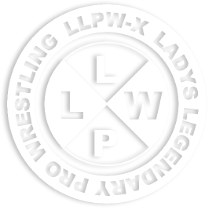
- Acronym: LLPW-X
- Founded: 1992
- Style: Joshi puroresu
- Headquarters: Toshima, Tokyo
- Founder(s): Rumi Kazama; Shinobu Kandori
- Owner(s): Rumi Kazama; Shinobu Kandori
- Split from: Japan Women's Pro-Wrestling
- Website: http://llpw-x.com/

Ladies Legend Pro-Wrestling, also known as LLPW and currently as LLPW-X, is a Japanese independent women's professional wrestling promotion founded in 1992 by Rumi Kazama and Shinobu Kandori.

== History ==
Japan Women's Pro-Wrestling split in 1992 into two promotions, JWP and LLPW. Kandori formed LLPW and was both a co-owner and one of their top stars. The group contained former Japan Women's Pro wrestlers and recruited the formerly retired All Japan Women's wrestler, Noriyo Tateno. Their debut show was on August 29, 1992. The promotion co-promoted with All Japan Women's in the 1990s, with many All Japan Women vs LLPW matchups. In 1995, LLPW held a female Mixed martial arts tournament called, "LLPW Ultimate L-1 Tournament", which was one of the first female MMA shows. In 2002, the group changed its name to LLPW-X.

As of 2010, the group is no longer running regularly, but has at least ran one event per year.

== Championships ==
Championship	Current champion(s)	Date won	Previous champion(s)	Reference
LLPW Single Championship	Rumi Kazama	June 17, 2014	Mako Ogawa	
LLPW Tag Team Championship	Eiger and Sayuri Okino	June 17, 2014	Eagle Sawai and Noriyo Tateno	
LLPW 6-Woman Tag Team Championship	Vacant	October 21, 2002	Keiko Aono, Mizuki Endo and Rieko Amano	

== Roster ==
- Mizuki Endo / Eiger
- Sayuri Okino (Inactive)
- Shinobu Kandori
- Takako Inoue

== Former talent ==
- Rumi Kazama
- Eagle Sawai
- Harley Saito
- Keiko Aono
- Yasha Kurenai
- Michiko Nagashima
- Mizuki Endo
- Kaoru Ito
- Mikiko Futagami/Gami
- Utako Hozomi
- Leo Kitamura
- Yukari Osawa
- Michiko Omukai
- Miki Handa
