= All Japan Women's Pro-Wrestling =

Japanese professional wrestling promotion

- Acronym: AJW
- Founded: 1968
- Defunct: 2005
- Style: Joshi puroresu
- Headquarters: Japan
- Founder: Matsunaga brothers
- Predecessor: All Japan Women's Pro-Wrestling Association
- Successor: New AJW (unofficial)

All Japan Women's Pro-Wrestling (全日本女子プロレス, Zennihon Joshi Puroresu), nicknamed Zenjo (全女: 全 meaning "All", 女 meaning "Woman") was a joshi puroresu (women's professional wrestling) promotion established in 1968 by Takashi Matsunaga and his brothers. The group held their first card on June 4 of that year. For close to 33 years it had a TV program on Fuji TV called Women's Professional Wrestling.

== History ==
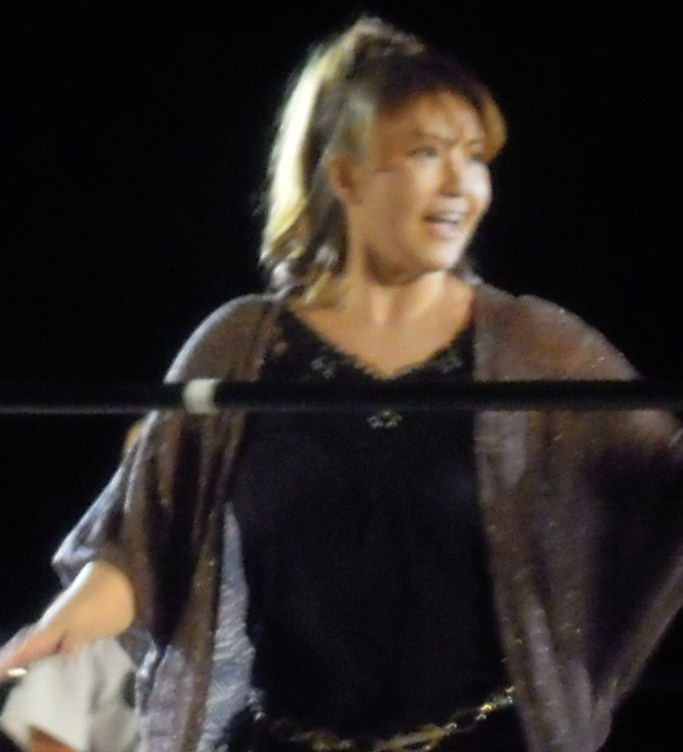
Bull Nakano

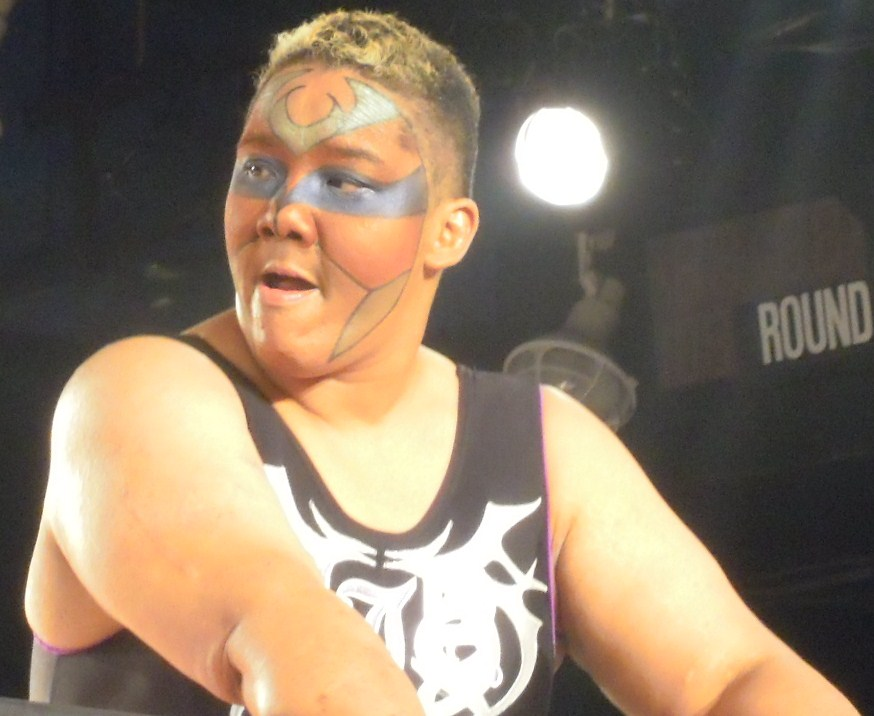
Aja Kong

The All Japan Women's Pro-Wrestling Corporation, established in 1968, was the successor to the All Japan Women's Pro-Wrestling Association, which had been formed in August 1955, to oversee the plethora of women's wrestling promotions that had sprung up in Japan following a tour in November, 1954, by Mildred Burke and her World Women's Wrestling Association (WWWA). These promotions included the All Japan Women's Pro-Wrestling Federation, and the All Japan Women's Wrestling Club, started in 1948, which was the first women's wrestling promotion in Japan. For a time the Club pushed female wrestling as a legitimate sport, booking sporting arenas.

By the mid-1960s, the association had fallen apart, due to infighting between the member promotions, and female wrestling was relegated back to being a sideshow act in strip-tease theaters. In 1967, another attempt to organize the sport of women's professional wrestling was made with a new All Japan Women's Pro-Wrestling Association. This time the Fabulous Moolah, the NWA Women's Champion, came across from the United States and traded her title with Yukiko Tomoe, to lend legitimacy to the promotion. The new Association broke up later that year. Finally, in 1968, Takashi Matsunaga, who had been the promoter for All Japan Women's Pro-Wrestling Federation, formed the All Japan Women's Pro-Wrestling Corporation (AJW) with his brothers Kenji, Kunimatsu and Toshikuni. The promotion held its first card on June 4, 1968, and got a television deal with Fuji TV in the same year.

In the fall of 1970, AJW, which had been contesting the American Girls' Wrestling Association Championship since the previous year, hosted Marie Vagnone, new holder of Mildred Burke's WWWA World Single Championship which had been revived in a WWWA tournament earlier that year in Los Angeles. On October 15, 1970, in Tokyo, Vagnone lost the WWWA title to Aiko Kyo, and AJW had a new world championship singles belt. The next year, AJW acquired the WWWA World Tag Team Championship as well, when Jumbo Miyamoto and Aiko Kyo were made the first champions on June 30, 1971.

During the early 1970s, AJW's championship booking was dominated by the traditional trading between a Japanese face and a foreign (usually North American) heel. The tag belt, for example, was traded fifty-six times between 1971 and 1975, each time between a Japanese team and an American team. This pattern began to change in 1975 with the new stardom of Mach Fumiake and the Beauty Pair (Jackie Sato and Maki Ueda). On March 19, 1975, Mach Fumiake won the WWWA Championship from Jumbo Miyamoto, breaking the pattern in the singles division. After that, only three non-Japanese women ever won the belt, the Canadian Monster Ripper, on July 31, 1979, and March 15, 1980, the Mexican La Galactica, on May 7, 1983, and the American Amazing Kong, on June 4, 2004.

On July 6, 1980, the promotion had enough popularity to run more shows throughout the country, which resulted in AJW splitting into two teams. Team A featured wrestlers such as Jackie Sato, Jaguar Yokota and Mimi Hagiwara while Team B featured Nancy Kumi, Lucy Kayama and Chino Sato. This lasted until June 1981.

During the 1980s, AJW continued to feature popular female wrestlers, including Wrestling Observer Newsletter (WON) Hall of Famers, Bull Nakano, Jaguar Yokota, Devil Masami, Dump Matsumoto, and the Crush Gals (Chigusa Nagayo and Lioness Asuka). The feud between the Crush Gals and the heel stable Gokuaku Domei, led by Matsumoto, was possibly the most popular angle in all of Japanese wrestling during the 1980s, bringing very high ratings to AJW's weekly television program which caused the show be aired during prime-time. This also resulted in record numbers of girls wanting to become wrestlers with the 1984 auditions having 2,000 candidates.

Up until 1986, AJW had been the only major women's wrestling (joshi puroresu or simply joshi) promotion in Japan. Then, on August 17, 1986, Japan Women's Pro-Wrestling (JWP) was started, by former AJW stars Jackie Sato and Nancy Kumi, as well as boxer Rumi Kazama and others. As All Japan Women's popularity decreased after the Crush Gals retired, the promotion's television show was moved to midnight.

While AJW remained the top promotion through the early 1990s, due to talent including Akira Hokuto, Aja Kong, Manami Toyota and Kyoko Inoue, the number of joshi puroresu promotions kept increasing, with Ladies Legend Pro-Wrestling and JWP forming in 1992 after the collapse of Japan Women's Pro-Wrestling. This created an unprecedented era of co-operation between the various companies which resulted in many inter-promotional shows including Big Egg Wrestling Universe, the first ever all women's show at the Tokyo Dome. Competition increased again as Gaea Japan formed in 1995 and JDStar formed in 1996 with both promotions having former All Japan Women's stars including Chigusa Nagayo, Akira Hokuto, Lioness Asuka and Jaguar Yokota.

1997 would prove to be a nightmare year for All Japan Women as the owners of All Japan Women's went bankrupt after losing money in real estate, the stock market and other business ventures. Due to this, they lost 14 wrestlers from July to September 1997. Kyoko Inoue, Etsuko Mita, Mima Shimoda, Chaparita ASARI, Yoshiko Tamura and others left to form NEO Japan Ladies Pro-Wrestling. Toshiyo Yamada left for Gaea Japan. Aja Kong, Mariko Yoshida, Reggie Bennett, Yumi Fukawa and Rie Tamada left to form Arsion. In October 1997, the promotion's building which held the AJW office, the wrestler dormitories, the training area, the garage (where small events were sometimes held) and a restaurant where the younger wrestlers worked was handed over to creditors. In October, they also lost their television show on Fuji TV which they later regained in July 1998.

In 2002, AJW lost its television spot again and the promotion closed its doors in April 2005 after 37 years, making it the longest-running promotion in Japan up to that time (Men's promotions New Japan Pro Wrestling and All Japan Pro Wrestling have since reached 50 years as of 2022).

Promotion company Tajima Kikaku re-established "New" AJW in 2006, however they only acquired the rights to the promotion's name and logo from the Matsunaga family, not the titles. The talent was mostly borrowed from JWP Project and the cards were sporadic. In 2012 the "New" AJW stopped promoting cards.

== Events ==
The most notable annual events in AJW were the Japan Grand Prix and Tag League the Best. The Japan Grand Prix was held each summer, from 1985 to 2004, and was a tournament to determine the number one contender for the WWWA World Single Championship, similar to the G1 Climax or Champion Carnival seen in the men's promotions New Japan Pro-Wrestling and All Japan Pro Wrestling, respectively. Tag League the Best was held each fall, also from 1985 to 2004, and was a tag team tournament.

AJW also held several regular annual events during the 1990s. The first was Wrestlemarinpiad, which was held in the fall or spring from 1989 to 1997, and for the last time in 2000. Also prominent was Wrestling Queendom, held from 1993 to 1997, the first held in November and the rest in the end of March.

== Championships ==
=== World Women's Wrestling Association ===
Championship	Final champion(s)	Reign	Date won	Previous champion(s)
WWWA World Single Championship	Nanae Takahashi	1	March 26, 2006	Kumiko Maekawa
WWWA All Pacific Championship	Lioness Asuka	1	February 20, 2005	Hikaru
WWWA World Tag Team Championship	Double Kong; Aja Kong and Amazing Kong	1 (5, 1)	October 6, 2004	Vacant
WWWA World Martial Arts Championship	Fumiko Ishimoto	1	March 21, 1995	Vacant
WWWA World Super Lightweight Championship	Chaparita Asari	4	May 5, 2003	Ai Fujita
WWWA World Midget's Championship	Little Frankie	3	August 27, 2002	Vacant
WWWA World Midget's Tag Team Championship	Pretty Atom and Little Frankie	1	1982	Amakusa Umibozu and Mr. Pone

=== All Japan Women's Pro-Wrestling commission ===
Championship	Final champion(s)	Reign	Date won	Previous champion(s)
AJW Championship	Saki Maemura	1	January 3, 2004	Hikaru
AJW Junior Championship	Rena Takase	1	December 22, 2002	Mika Nishio
AJW Tag Team Championship	Takako Inoue and Tomoko Watanabe	1 (3, 2)	October 6, 2004	Tannie Mouse and Yuki Miyazaki

=== International Wrestling Association ===
Championship	Final champion(s)	Reign	Date won	Previous champion(s)
IWA World Women's Championship	Kyoko Inoue	2	January 20, 1997	Takako Inoue

=== American Girls' Wrestling Association ===
Championship	Final champion(s)	Reign	Date won	Previous champion(s)
AGWA International Girls' Championship	Yukiko Tomoe	1	March 31, 1969	Barbara Owens
AGWA International Tag Team Championship	Aiko Kyo and Jumbo/Yoshiko Miyamoto	5 (9, 5)	June 20, 1971	Masked Killer and Masked Lee
AGWA United States Girls' Championship	Miyuki Yanagi	1	1969	Yukiko Tomoe

== Tournaments ==
Tournament	Final champion(s)	Year
Tag League the Best	Hanako Nakamori and Makoto	2016
Japan Grand Prix	Kumiko Maekawa	2004
Rookie of the Year Tournament	Tomoko Morii	2001

== AJW Hall of Fame ==
The AJW Hall of Fame had its first inducted class enshrined on November 29, 1998, at the Yokohama Arena in Yokohama, Japan. This was at AJW's 30th anniversary event. All but two members of the Hall of Fame (indicated with a †) were inducted at the initial ceremony.

=== Members ===
- Mariko Akagi
- Lioness Asuka (Tomoko Kitamura)
- Mach Fumiake
- Akira Hokuto (Hisako Sasaki)
- Miyoko Hoshino
- Sadako Ikari
- Yumi Ikeshita
- Aja Kong (Erika Shishido)
- Aiko Kyo
- Touichi Mannen (First AJW President)†
- Plum Mariko (Mariko Umeda)†
- Devil Masami (Masami Yoshida)
- Dump Matsumoto (Kaoru Matsumoto)
- Jumbo Miyamoto
- Monster Ripper (Rhonda Singh)†
- Chigusa Nagayo
- Bull Nakano (Keiko Nakano)
- Chiyo Obata
- Yukari Omori
- Jackie Sato†
- Atsuo Shiono (Announcer)
- Yukiko Tomoe
- Maki Ueda
- Shinji Ueda (AJW Commissioner)†
- Miyuki Yanagi †
- Jaguar Yokota (Rimi Yokota)

== Rookie classes ==
=== Rookies by year ===
- 1974 – Mach Fumiake
- 1975 – Maki Ueda, Jackie Sato, Yumi Ikeshita
- 1976 – Nancy Kumi, Victoria Fujimi, Little Frankie
- 1977 – Jaguar Yokota, Mami Kumano, Tomi Aoyama, Lucy Kayama
- 1978 – Mimi Hagiwara, Devil Masami, Jumbo Hori, Chino Sato, Hiroko Komine
- 1979 – Noriko Kawako
- 1980 – Chigusa Nagayo, Lioness Asuka, Dump Matsumoto, Yukari Omori, Crane Yu, Yuriko Takagai, Tarantula
- 1981 – Noriyo Tateno, Itsuki Yamazaki
- 1982 – Hiromi Komatsubara
- 1983 – Bull Nakano, Yumi Ogura, Mika Komatsu, Kanako Nagatomo, Tommy Ran(referee), Mr. Buddhaman
- 1984 – Condor Saito, Kazue Nagahori
- 1985 – Akira Hokuto, Suzuka Minami, Yumiko Hotta, Mitsuko Nishiwaki, Grizzly Iwamoto, Yasuko Ishiguro, Drill Nakamae, Akemi Sakamoto, Fumie Kanzaki, Sayuri Nakajima, Rie Okabayashi, Kage Kahoru, Maki Sato
- 1986 – Aja Kong, Bison Kimura, Miori Kamiya/Cooga, KAORU, Megumi Kudo, Combat Toyoda, Mika Takahashi, Reibun Amada
- 1987 – Manami Toyota, Toshiyo Yamada, Etsuko Mita, Mima Shimoda
- 1988 – Kyoko Inoue, Takako Inoue, Mariko Yoshida
- 1989 – Sakie Hasegawa, Kaoru Ito, Tomoko Watanabe, Bat Yoshinaga, Michiko Nagashima, Mayumi Yamamoto, Hisae Kuboki, Kazue Saito
- 1990 – Numacchi, Akemi Torisu, Shiho Nakamigawa, Yuki Lee
- 1991 – Kumiko Maekawa, Chikako Shiratori, Rie Tamada, Michiko Omukai, Debbie Malenko
- 1992 – Chaparita ASARI, Yuka Shiina
- 1993 – Yumi Fukawa
- 1994 – Yoshiko Tamura, Misae Genki, Tanny Mouse, Yoko Takahashi, Saya Endo, The Bloody
- 1995 – Kayo Noumi
- 1996 – Momoe Nakanishi, Nanae Takahashi, Miho Wakizawa, Sasori
- 1997 – Nana Nakahara and Noriko Toyoda
- 1998 – Tomoka Isozaki and Mika Harigai
- 1999 – Hikaru, Ayako Seki
- 2000 – Mika Nishio, Chie Terashita
- 2001 – Mirai, Saki Maemura
- 2002 – Awesome Kong
- 2003 – Natsuki Taiyo, Deborah K
