= Banny Oikawa =

Japanese professional wrestler

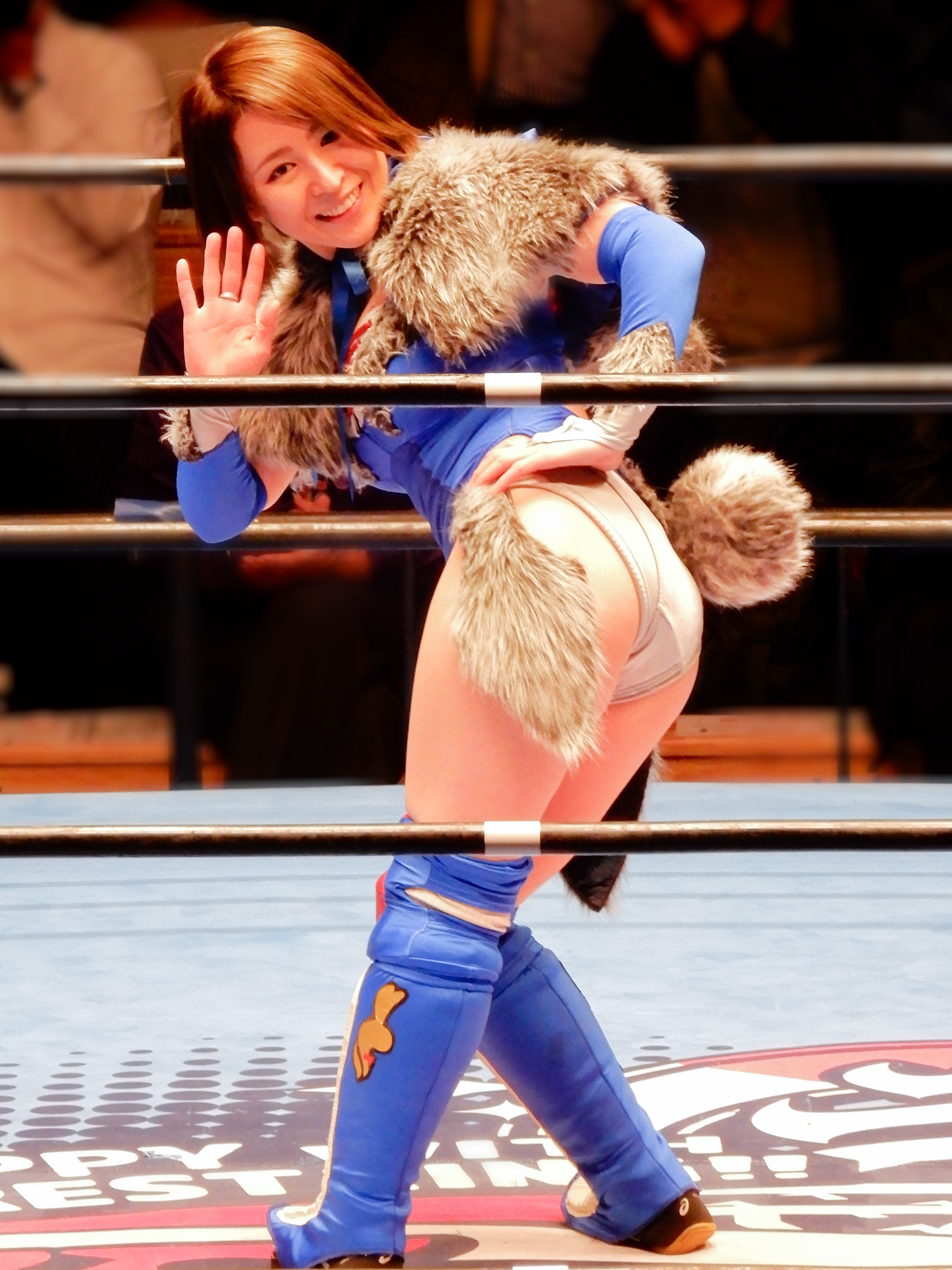
- Oikawa in 2021

Personal information
- Born: October 21 Wakō, Japan

Professional wrestling career
- Ring name: Banny Oikawa
- Billed height: 151 cm (4 ft 11 in)
- Billed weight: 43 kg (95 lb)
- Trained by: Tsukasa Fujimoto; Cherry
- Debut: 2018

Banny Oikawa (バニー及川, Banī Oikawa) is a Japanese professional wrestler currently performing the Japanese promotion Ice Ribbon where she is a former Triangle Ribbon Champion.

== Professional wrestling career ==
=== Ice Ribbon (2018–present) ===
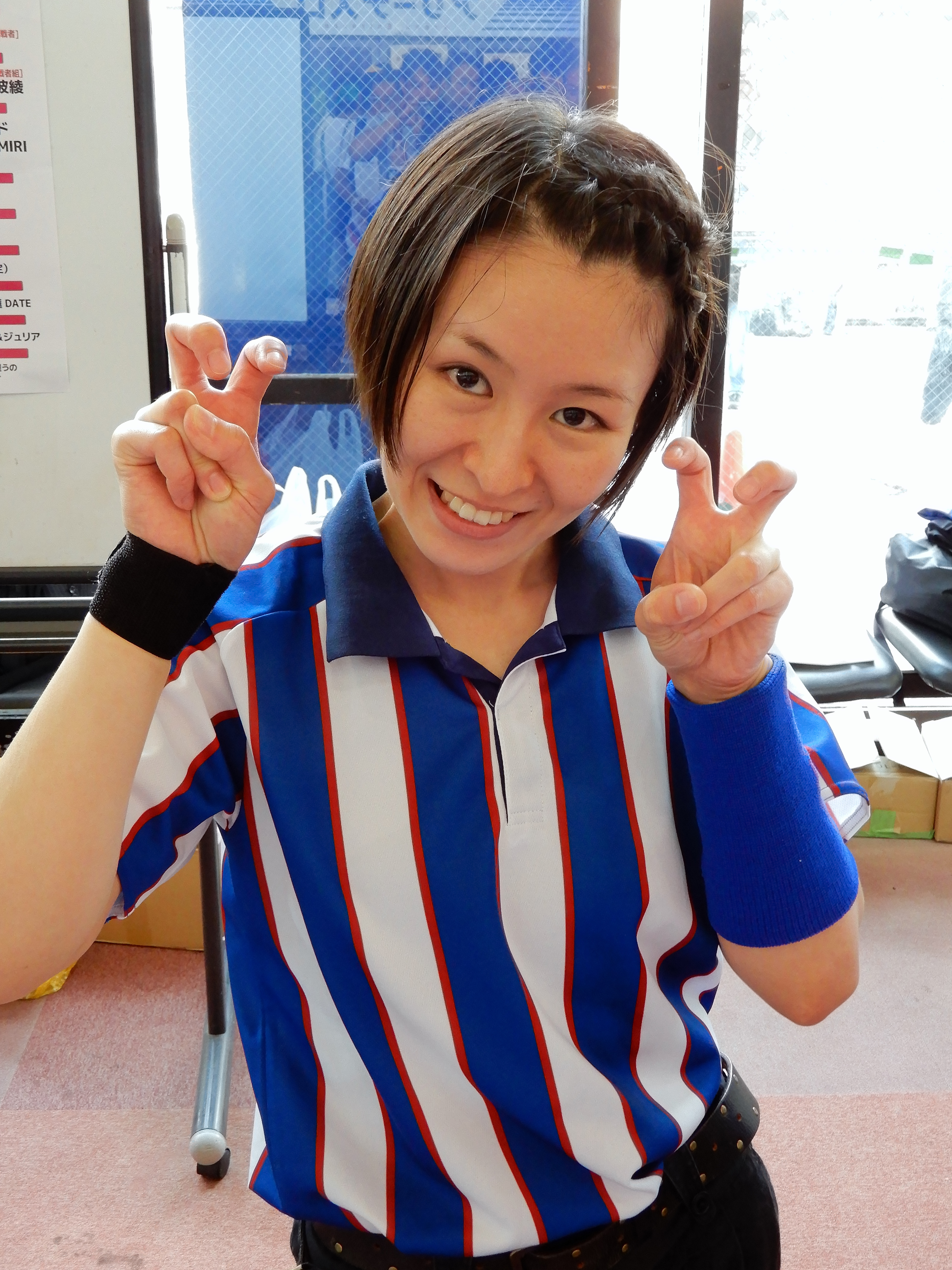
Oikawa in 2018 as a referee

Oikawa is best known for her tenure with Ice Ribbon. She made her professional wrestling debut at RibbonMania 2018 on December 31, where she won the Triangle Ribbon Championship at her very debut by defeating reigning champion Miyako Matsumoto and Matsuya Uno in a three-way match. Oikawa underwent her official debut match at Ice Ribbon New Ice Ribbon #957 Golden Week on May 1, 2019, where she dropped the Triangle title to Maya Yukihi in a match which also involved Tsukasa Fujimoto. During her tenure with the promotion, Oikawa chased for other championships promoted by it. At Ice Ribbon New Ice Ribbon #977 on August 14, 2019, she competed in a tournament for the vacant ICE Cross Infinity Championship in which she fell short to Maya Yukihi in the second round.

She also took part in many match gimmicks. At RibbonMania 2019 on December 31, she competed in Tequila Saya's retirement match, a gauntlet match in which the latter put herself against 44 opponents. Some of the most notable were Oikawa herself alongside Miku Aono, Ken Ohka, Manami Toyota, Risa Sera, Rina Yamashita, Ram Kaicho, Syuri, Tae Honma, and many others. At Ice Ribbon P's Party #93 on November 17, 2021, Oikawa participated at Rina Shingaki's last match from Ice Ribbon before her retirement, a gauntlet match in which Shingaki defeated all the participants including Asahi, Hamuko Hoshi, Momo Kohgo, Satsuki Totoro, Tsukushi Haruka, Yuki Mashiro and others. Oikawa competed in one of the promotion's signature events, the 2020 edition of the Kizuna Tournament in which she teamed up with Hiragi Kurumi and fell short to Suzu Suzuki and Maya Yukihi in the first rounds.

=== Independent scene (2019–present) ===
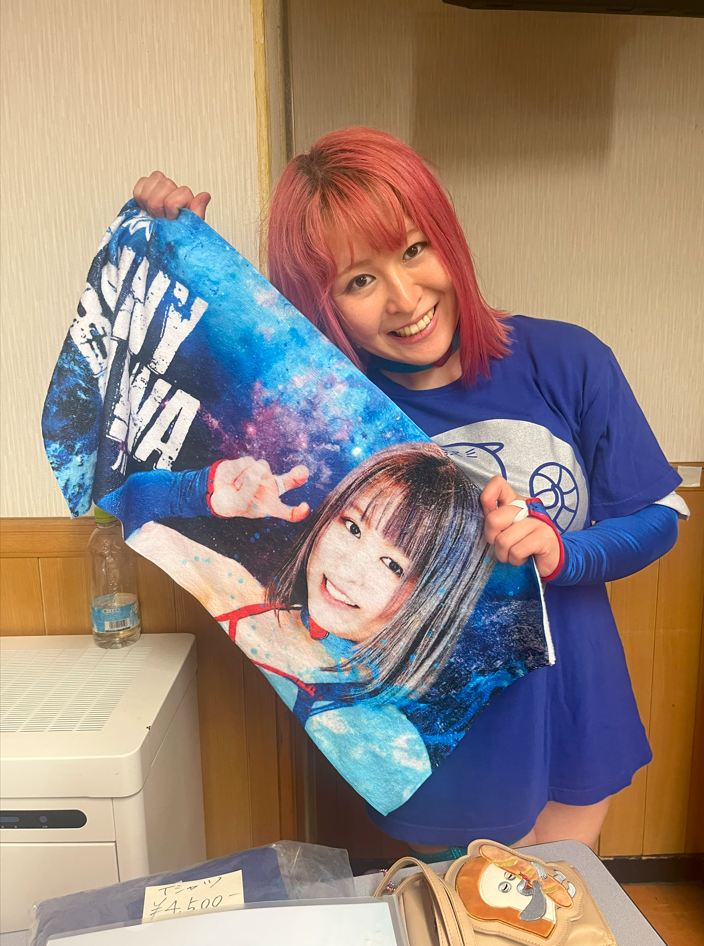
Oikawa in 2024

Due to Ice Ribbon sharing business partnerships with various promotions, Oikawa competed in several companies of the Japanese independent scene, working as a joshi talent. At 2AW ChiBattle 36, an event promoted by Active Advance Pro Wrestling on June 23, 2019, she teamed up with Bambi in a losing effort against Rina Shingaki and Ayame Sasamura. At DDT Ganbare Joshi Pro Wrestling, an event promoted by then-time DDT Pro-Wrestling satellite promotion Ganbare Pro-Wrestling on February 2, 2020, Oikawa competed twice. First in a two-count rules match in which she fell short to Moeka Haruhi, and secondly in a secret captain's fall match in which she teamed up with Cherry and Yuu in a losing effort against Haruhi, Harukaze and Asuka. At a house show promoted by World Woman Pro-Wrestling Diana on February 10, 2020, Oikawa fell short to Nanami in singles competition.

== Championships and accomplishments ==
- Ice Ribbon
  - Triangle Ribbon Championship (1 time)
