= Kakeru Sekiguchi =

Japanese professional wrestler

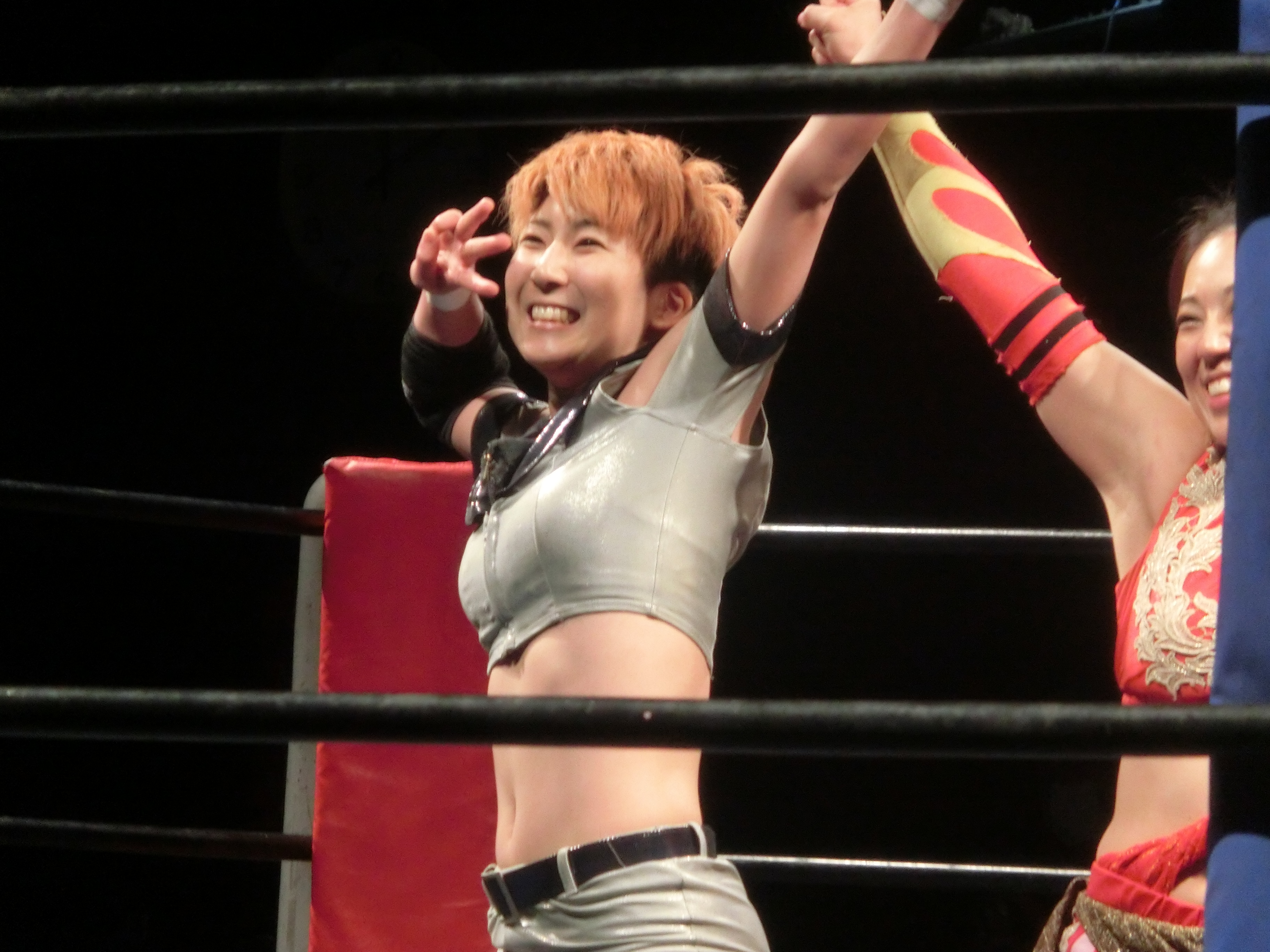
- Sekiguchi in February 2018

Personal information
- Born: September 27, 1994 (age 32) Chiba, Japan

Professional wrestling career
- Ring name(s): Takako Sekiguchi; Shoko Sekiguchi; Kakeru Sekiguchi
- Billed height: 158 cm (5 ft 2 in)
- Billed weight: 52 kg (115 lb)
- Trained by: Yumiko Hotta
- Debut: 2017

Kakeru Sekiguchi (関口翔, Sekiguchi Kakeru) is a Japanese professional wrestler currently working as a freelancer best known for her tenure with the Japanese promotions Actwres girl'Z and Oz Academy.

== Professional wrestling career ==
=== Independent Circuit (2017-present) ===
As a freelancer, Sekiguchi is known for competing in multiple promotions of the Japanese independent scene. At LLPW-X Takako Inoue 30th Anniversary Show, an event promoted by Ladies Legend Pro-Wrestling on October 2, 2018, Sekiguchi teamed up with Tomoko Watanabe in a losing effort against CRYSIS (Jaguar Yokota and Megumi Yabushita). On the fifth night of Wrestle-1's 2018 Trans Magic Tour from March 14, 2018, Sekiguchi teamed up with Natsumi Maki in a losing effort against Hana Kimura and Saori Anou. At 2AW Rina Shingaki Retirement Show, an event promoted by Active Advance Pro Wrestling on November 23, 2021, Sekiguchi teamed up with Shiori Asahi to defeat Itsuki Aoki and Ricky Fuji. At the 10th Anniversary of Kaori Yoneyama's Retirement Withdrawal, an event promoted by YMZ Wrestling on December 23, 2021, Sekiguchi teamed up with Rina Yamashita, Asuka and Hikaru Sato to defeat Kaori Yoneyama, Masahiro Takanashi, Moeka Haruhi and Tsubasa Kuragaki in a Christmas cosplay eight-man tag team match. At Pure-J Climax 2021 ob December 26, she teamed up with Mika Akino and Sonoko Kato as Mission K4 to defeat Wanted (Kazuki, Momo Tani and Rydeen Hagane) as a result of a six-woman tag team match.

=== Actwres girl'Z (2017-present) ===
Sekiguchi made her professional wrestling debut in Actwres girl'Z at AgZ Act 18, an event promoted on March 26, 2017, where she fell short to Asami Hisato. At AWG Act 45 on January 8, 2020, she competed in a 19-person battle royal won by Rina Amikura and also involving Himeka Arita, Tae Honma, Miyuki Takase, Yumiko Hotta and others. At Ice Ribbon & Actwres girl'Z Joint Show on November 16, 2020, Sekiguchi teamed up with Ami Miura, Hikari Shimizu, Mari and Saki as Team AWG in a losing effort against Team Ice Ribbon (Hiragi Kurumi, Ibuki Hoshi, Matsuya Uno, Satsuki Totoro and Tsukushi Haruka) as a result of a gauntlet tag team match.

=== Oz Academy (2017-present) ===
Another promotion in which Sekiguchi competes is Oz Academy. She made her first appearance at OZ Academy Plum Hanasaku 2017 on August 20, where she teamed up with Mission K4 stablemate Sonoko Kato in a losing effort against Ozaki-gun (Maya Yukihi and Mayumi Ozaki). At OZ Academy Connect To The Future on December 2, 2018, Sekiguchi unsuccessfully challenged Hikaru Shida for the Oz Academy Openweight Championship in one of her rookie challenge matches. At OZ Academy Come Back To Shima! on May 26, 2019, she competed in a 13-person battle royal won by Itsuki Aoki and also involving Cherry, Kaori Yoneyama, Tsubasa Kuragaki, Yoshiko and others. At The End of the Year on December 30, 2020, she teamed up with Mission K4 stablemate Kaho Kobayashi to defeat another pair of stablemates Mika Akino and Sonoko Kato for the Oz Academy Tag Team Championship.

=== Pro Wrestling Wave (2018-present) ===
Sekiguchi makes sporadic appearances in Pro Wrestling Wave. At WAVE Summer Fiesta 2018 ~ Young OH! OH! ~Summer Koshien OH! OH!~ on July 31, 2018, she teamed up with Giulia and Mio Momono in a losing effort against Hiroe Nagahama, Miyuki Takase and Rin Kadokura as a result of a best two out of three falls tag team match. At WAVE NAMI 1, an event promoted on March 1, 2020, she teamed up with Misa Matsui, falling short to Yuki Miyazaki and Yuu.

== Championships and accomplishments ==
- Actwres girl'Z
  - AWG Tag Team Championship (1 time, final) – with Miku Aono
  - Color’s Championship (2 times)
- DDT Pro-Wrestling
  - Ironman Heavymetalweight Championship (1 time)
- Ice Ribbon
  - Triangle Ribbon Championship (1 time)
- Oz Academy
  - Oz Academy Pioneer 3-Way Championship (2 time ,current)
  - Oz Academy Tag Team Championship (1 time) – with Kaho Kobayashi
  - Oz Academy Tag Team Championship #1 Contendership Tournament (2020)
    - Best Bout Award (2023) with Mayumi Ozaki and Saori Anou vs. Chigusa Nagayo, Mio Momono and Tomoko Watanabe on October 22
- Pro Wrestling Wave
  - Catch the Wave Award (2 times)
    - Best Bout Award (2024) vs. Itsuki Aoki on May 5
    - Technique Award (2024)
- Pure-J
  - Daily Sports Women's Tag Team Championship (1 time) - with Kaori Yoneyama
