= Neko Nitta =

Japanese professional wrestler (born 1978)

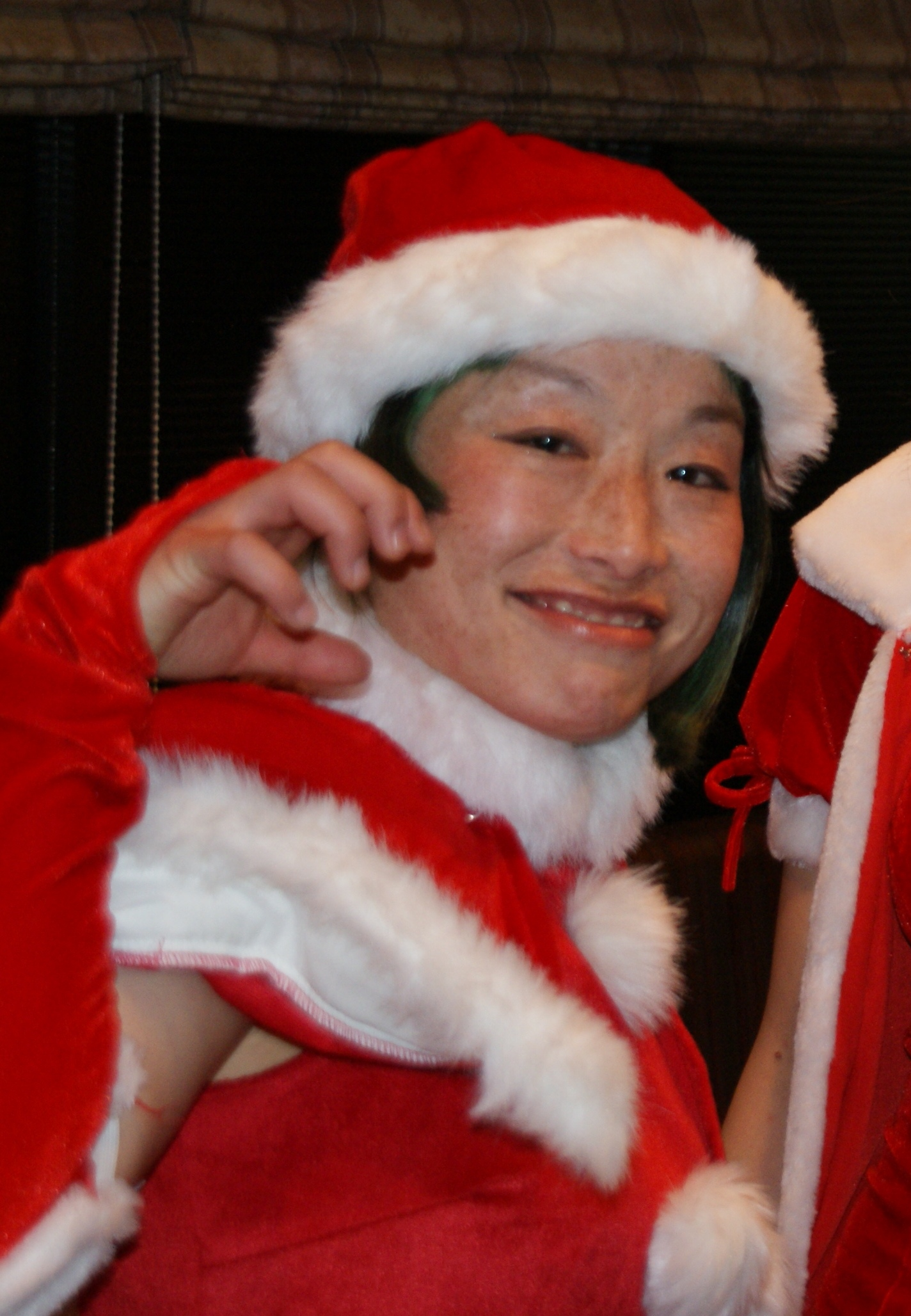
- Nitta in December 2011

Personal information
- Born: May 7, 1978 (age 48) Saitama, Japan

Professional wrestling career
- Ring name: Neko Nitta
- Billed height: 154 cm (5 ft 1 in)
- Billed weight: 55 kg (121 lb)
- Trained by: Emi Sakura; Hayate; Ray
- Debut: 2011
- Retired: December 31, 2015

Neko Nitta (新田猫子, Nitta Neko) is a Japanese retired professional wrestler and is best known for her tenure with the Japanese promotion Ice Ribbon where she is a former Triangle Ribbon Champion.

== Professional wrestling career ==
=== Independent circuit (2011-2015) ===
As a former freelancer, Nitta is known for working with various promotions. At DDT Yokohama New Year, an event promoted by DDT Pro Wrestling on January 6, 2013, Nitta teamed up with Hiroshi Fukuda and Yusaku Ito, losing to Hideyoshi Kamitani, Risa Sera and Tank Nagai in a six-man tag team match. At Sakura Hirota Produce Leave Maternity, a Japanese independent event from December 12, 2015, she competed in a 19-person battle royal also involving popular wrestlers such as Sumire Natsu, Ricky Fuji, Yuko Miyamoto, Yumi Ohka, Hercules Senga and others.

==== JWP Joshi Puroresu (2012-2014) ====
At JWP Climax 2014, an event produced by JWP Joshi Puroresu on December 28, 2014, Nitta teamed up with Manami Toyota and Tsukushi, losing to Jaguar Yokota, Kazuki and Rydeen Hagane in a six-person tag team match. Nitta made an appearance in the 2013 edition of the Tag League the Best where she teamed up with her "Nekoka Tag" partner Leon, placing themselves in the Block A and competing against the teams of Aripiko (Arisa Nakajima and Command Bolshoi) and Heart Move (Hanako Nakamori and Morii).

==== Ice Ribbon (2011-2015) ====
Nitta made her professional wrestling debut at Ice Ribbon New Ice Ribbon #269 from March 2, 2011, an event promoted by Ice Ribbon where she fell short to one of her coaches Emi Sakura. She continued to make appearances for the company such as at Ice Ribbon New Ice Ribbon #282 on April 16, 2011, where she worked in two distinctive matches. In one of them she teamed up with Meari Naito in a losing effort to Mika Iida and Mochi Miyagi of a tag team match and in the other one, a 19-woman battle royal, she competed against Riho, Kagetsu, Syuri, Hikaru Shida and others. At Ice Ribbon New Ice Ribbon #576 on July 21, 2014, Netta unsuccessfully challenged Tsukasa Fujimoto for the ICE Cross Infinity Championship.

At Ice Ribbon New Ice Ribbon #666 on July 29, 2015, Nitta competed in a 30-person gauntlet match also involving notable opponents such as Aja Kong, Kana, Konami, Hiroyo Matsumoto, Onryo and others. Nitta is a former six-time Triangle Ribbon Champion, title which she won for the last time by defeating Choun Shiryu in a three-way match also involving Konaka at Yokohama Ribbon V on November 24, 2014, and kept it until her retirement in late 2015. Nitta is also a former two-time International Ribbon Tag Team Champion, title which she lastly won by teaming up with Leon as "Nekoka Tag" at Ice in Wonderland on August 18, 2015, and defeating Shishunki (Mio Shirai and Tsukushi).

Nitta retired from professional wrestling on December 31, 2015, at the show named Ice Ribbon New Ice Ribbon #700 Neko Nitta Retirement where she teamed up with 235 to defeat Akane Fujita and Kyuri.

== Championships and accomplishments ==
- Ice Ribbon
  - Triangle Ribbon Championship (6 times)
  - International Ribbon Tag Team Championship (2 times) – with Miyako Matsumoto (1) and Leon (1)
