= Mochi Miyagi =

Japanese professional wrestler

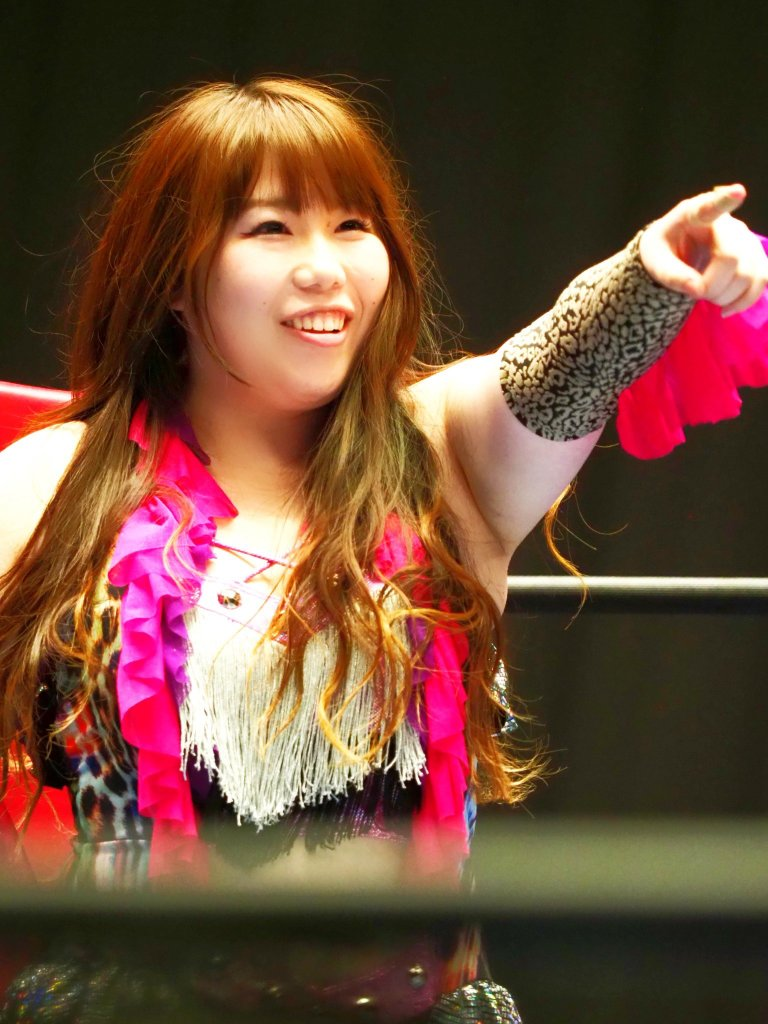
- Miyagi in July 2019

Personal information
- Born: July 21, 1986 (age 40) Miyagi, Japan

Professional wrestling career
- Ring names: Hamuko Mochi; Mochi Miyagi; Mochi Natsumi; Sexxxy Mochi; Sexy Mochi
- Billed height: 156 cm (5 ft 1 in)
- Billed weight: 70 kg (154 lb)
- Trained by: Emi Sakura
- Debut: 2010

Mochi Miyagi (宮城もち, Miyagi Mochi) is a Japanese professional wrestler currently working as a freelancer. She previously had tenures with the Japanese promotions Ice Ribbon and Pro Wrestling Wave.

== Professional wrestling career ==
=== Ice Ribbon (2010-2022) ===
Miyagi has worked in Ice Ribbon for more than a decade. She made her professional wrestling debut at New Ice Ribbon #249 on December 25, 2010, where she fell short to Kazumi Shimouma. Miyagi unsuccessfully challenged Risa Sera for the ICE Cross Infinity Championship at New Ice Ribbon #796 on April 15, 2017. At New Ice Ribbon #1013 ~ RibbonMania 2019 on December 31, she participated in Tequila Saya's retirement match, a 44-person gauntlet match also involving Syuri, Tae Honma, Rina Shingaki, Itsuki Aoki, Kaori Yoneyama, Ken Ohka, Cherry, Manami Toyota, Lingerie Muto and many others. Miyagi is a former International Ribbon Tag Team Champion, titles which she has won three ties with her "Lovely Butchers" tag partner Haumko Hoshi lastly on July 1, 2018, at Sapporo Ribbon by defeating Azure Revolution (Maya Yukihi and Risa Sera), and one time with Hiragi Kurumi as "Frank Sisters" by defeating Dropkickers (Tsukasa Fujimoto and Tsukushi) at Ice Ribbon Yokohama Bunka Gymnasium Final on August 9, 2020. At New Ice Ribbon #1037 on April 25, 2020, she fell short to Tsukushi in a tournament match for the IW 19 Championship.Miyagi unsuccessfully challenged Risa Sera for the ICE Cross Infinity Championship at New Ice Ribbon #796 on April 15, 2017.

Miyagi often competed in events held by Ice Ribbon in partnership with various other promotions. On November 11, 2020, the promotion held the Ice Ribbon Vs. Shinjuku 2-chome Joshi Pro Wrestling event with Miyagi competing in the afternoon show in a 14-man battle royal won by Totoro Satsuki and also involving Akane Fujita, Asukama, Shinobu, Maika Ozaki, Ram Kaicho and others. At the evening show she competed again in the same kind of battle royal with the same participants, this time won by Asukama. At Ice Ribbon/AWG Ice Ribbon & Actwres girl'Z Joint Show on November 16, 2020, she teamed up with Michiko Miyagi to defeat Misa Matsui and Risa Sera.

=== Independent circuit (2010–present) ===
As a freelancer, Miyagi has competed in multiple promotions of the Japanese independent scene. At JWP Recapture in Sendai, an event promoted by JWP Joshi Puroresu on December 6, 2015, she defeated Yako Fujigasaki. At Oz Academy Fever's on March 21, 2018, she teamed up with Hamuko Hoshi in a losing effort against Mission K4 (Akino and Sonoko Kato). At a house show promoted by Marvelous That's Women Pro Wrestling on September 17, 2018, she teamed up with Cherry in a losing effort against W-FIX (Chikayo Nagashima and Megumi Yabushita). At Seadlinnng Go! Niigata! on February 3, 2019, she teamed up with Hamuko Hoshi as "Lovely Butchers" to defeat Matsuya Uno and Ryo Mizunami.

Miyagi often competed in men's promotions as joshi talent. At AJPW Super Power Series 2016 - Tag 3: SKIP Beat Kawaguchi Vol. 1, an event promoted by All Japan Pro Wrestling on May 22, 2016, she teamed up with Tsukushi in a losing effort against Azure Revolution (Maya Yukihi and Risa Sera). At BJW Summer Ueno Pro-Wrestling Festival - Part 9, an event promoted by Big Japan Pro Wrestling on August 23, 2016, she teamed up with Maruko Nagasaki to defeat Tequila Saya and Tsukushi. At Pro Wrestling Freedoms Osaka Fans Thanksgiving Day on September 3, 2017, she teamed up with Idea in a losing effort against Hamuko Hoshi and Yuya Susumu. At Pro Wrestling Zero1's Tenka-Ichi Junior Tournament 2018 on November 18, she picked up a victory against Giulia. After going off-contract with Ice Ribbon in January 2022, Miyagi joined the new formed stable Prominence and started working mostly as a freelancer ever since. In 2022, Miyagi began wrestling under the ring name Mochi Natsumi, with Natsumi being her real surname. At GLEAT G PROWRESTLING Ver. 15, an event promoted by Gleat on January 26, 2022, she teamed up with stablemates Akane Fujita and Suzu Suzuki to defeat Madeline, Michiko Miyagi and Yukari Hosokawa as a result of a six-man tag team match.

=== Pro Wrestling Wave (2015–present) ===
Another promotion which Miyagi has competed in is Pro Wrestling Wave. She made her first appearance at WAVE Young Oh! Oh! 14 on January 30, 2015, where she teamed up with Sawako Shimono to defeat Fairy Nihonbashi and Yua Hayashi. Miyagi participated in various of the promotion's signature events such as the Catch the Wave tournament. She made her first appearance at the 2017 edition of the event, placing herself in the "Other Than" Block and scoring a total of six points after going against Sareee, Rin Kadokura and Saki.

=== World Wonder Ring Stardom (2022–present) ===
Miyagi aligned herself with Suzu Suzuki, Risa Sera, Akane Fujita and Hiragi Kurumi in the Prominence stable at the end of 2021 after their contract with Ice Ribbon expired, leaving as freelancers. Miyagi and the others made their first appearance on 29 January 2022 in World Wonder Ring Stardom's first pay-per-view of the year, the Stardom Nagoya Supreme Fight from January 29 where they faced the Donna Del Mondo team.

== Championships and accomplishments ==
- Ice Ribbon
  - International Ribbon Tag Team Championship (4 times) – with Hamuko Hoshi (3) and Hiragi Kurumi (1)
  - Ice Ribbon Year-End Award (2 times)
    - Best Tag Team Award (2018) with Hamuko Hoshi
    - Best Tag Team Award (2020) with Hiragi Kurumi
- Pro Wrestling Wave
  - Wave Tag Team Championship (1 time) – with Hiragi Kurumi
  - Catch the Wave Award (1 time)
    - Technique Award (2017)
- Pure-J
  - Daily Sports Women's Tag Team Championship (1 time) – with Hiragi Kurumi
