= Kaho Matsushita =

Japanese wrestler (born 2003)

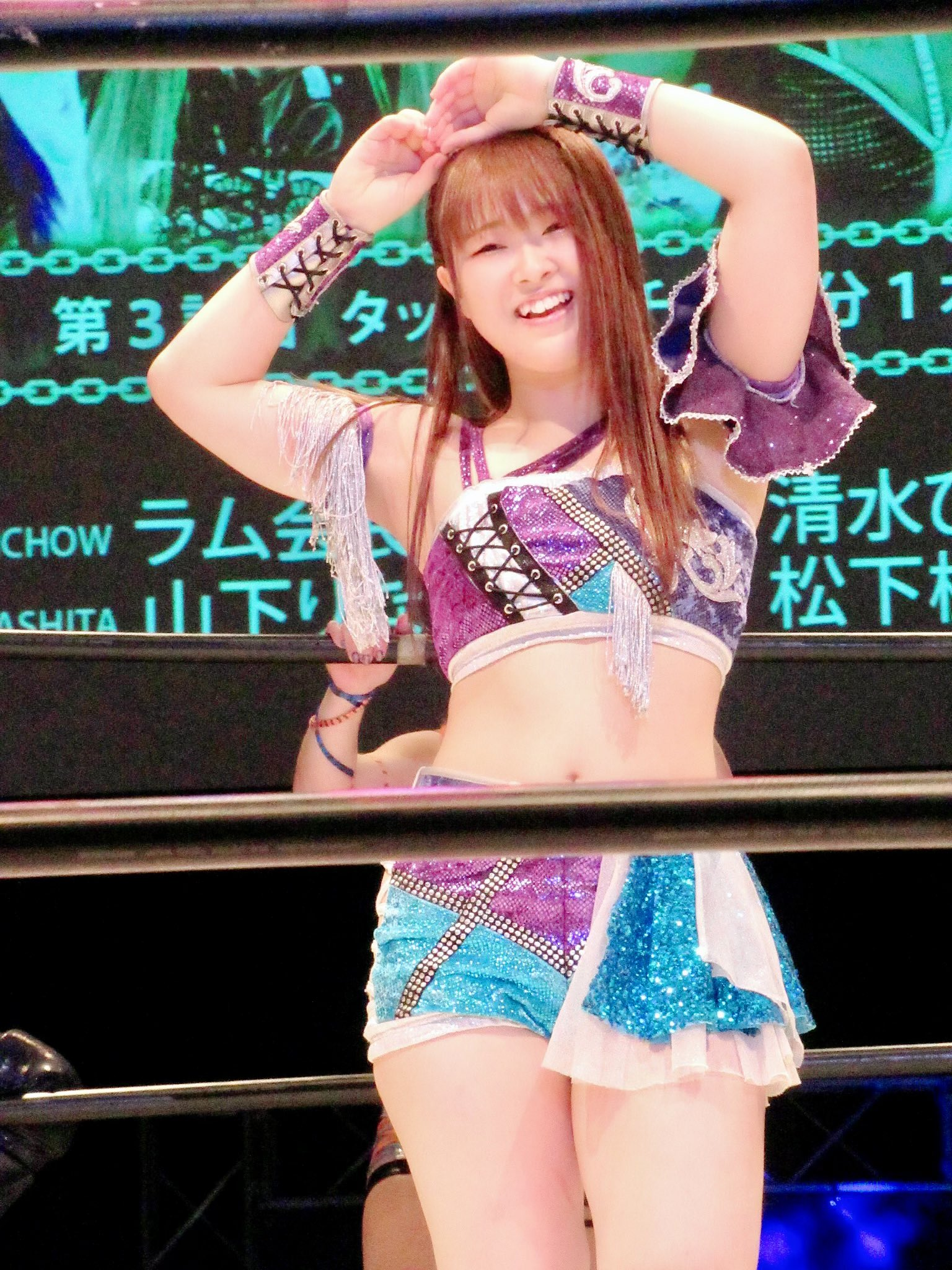
- Yuna in December 2022

Personal information
- Born: 31 January 2003 (age 23) Shizuoka, Japan

Professional wrestling career
- Ring name: Kaho Kaho Matsushita
- Billed height: 158 cm (5 ft 2 in)
- Billed weight: 56 kg (123 lb)
- Trained by: Ice Ribbon Dojo
- Debut: 2021

Kaho Matsushita (松下楓歩, Matsushita Kaho) is a Japanese professional wrestler signed to Ice Ribbon where she is a former ICE Cross Infinity Champion. She often works for various promotions of the Japanese independent scene.

== Professional wrestling career ==
=== Japanese independent circuit (2021–present) ===
Matsushita often competes in the Japanese independent circuit as a developmental talent. At GLEAT G PROWRESTLING Ver. 17, an event promoted by Gleat on February 11, 2022, she teamed up with Satsuki Totoro in a losing effort against Michiko Miyagi and Yukari Hosokawa in tag team competition. At Seadlinnng Of The Year 2022! on December 28, Matsushita unsuccessfully challenged Kakeru Sekiguchi in singles competition. At Ganbare Pro Ghost Hunters 2023, an event promoted by Ganbare Pro-Wrestling on June 30, 2023, she teamed up with Yoshiko Hasegawa in a losing effort against Harukaze and Yuuri.

=== Ice Ribbon (2021–present) ===
Matsushita made her professional wrestling debut at Ice Ribbon P's Party #92 on November 3, 2021, where she fell short to Tsukushi Haruka in singles competition.

During her time with the promotion, she chased for various accomplishments. At New Ice Ribbon #1337 on March 23, 2024, she unsuccessfully challenged for the Triangle Ribbon Championship against Yuki Mashiro and Makoto. At New Ice Ribbon #1438 on August 24, 2025, she teamed up with Ibuki Hoshi to unsuccessfully challenge Queen Valkyrie (Ancham and Yappy) for the International Ribbon Tag Team Championship. At Ice Ribbon #1464 ~ RibbonMania 2025 of December 31, Matsushita defeated Kirari Wakana and Yuuka in a three-way match to win the ICE Cross Infinity Championship vacated by Manami Katsu the same night after previously winning a number one contendership tournament. At New Ice Ribbon #1468 on January 11, 2026, she defeated Katsu to make her first successful title defense. At New Ice Ribbon #1490 on May 10, Matsushita defeated Tsukina Umino to get her second successful title defense. At New Ice Ribbon #1496 Hataage 20th Anniversary on June 20, she got her third successful title defense by defeating Yuuka. At New Ice Ribbon #1507 on August 9, Matsushita dropped the title to Sumika Yanagawa, ending her reign at 221 days.

== Championships and accomplishments ==
- Ice Ribbon
  - ICE Cross Infinity Championship (1 time)
  - Triangle Ribbon Championship (1 time, current)
