= Yuki Mashiro =

Japanese professional wrestler

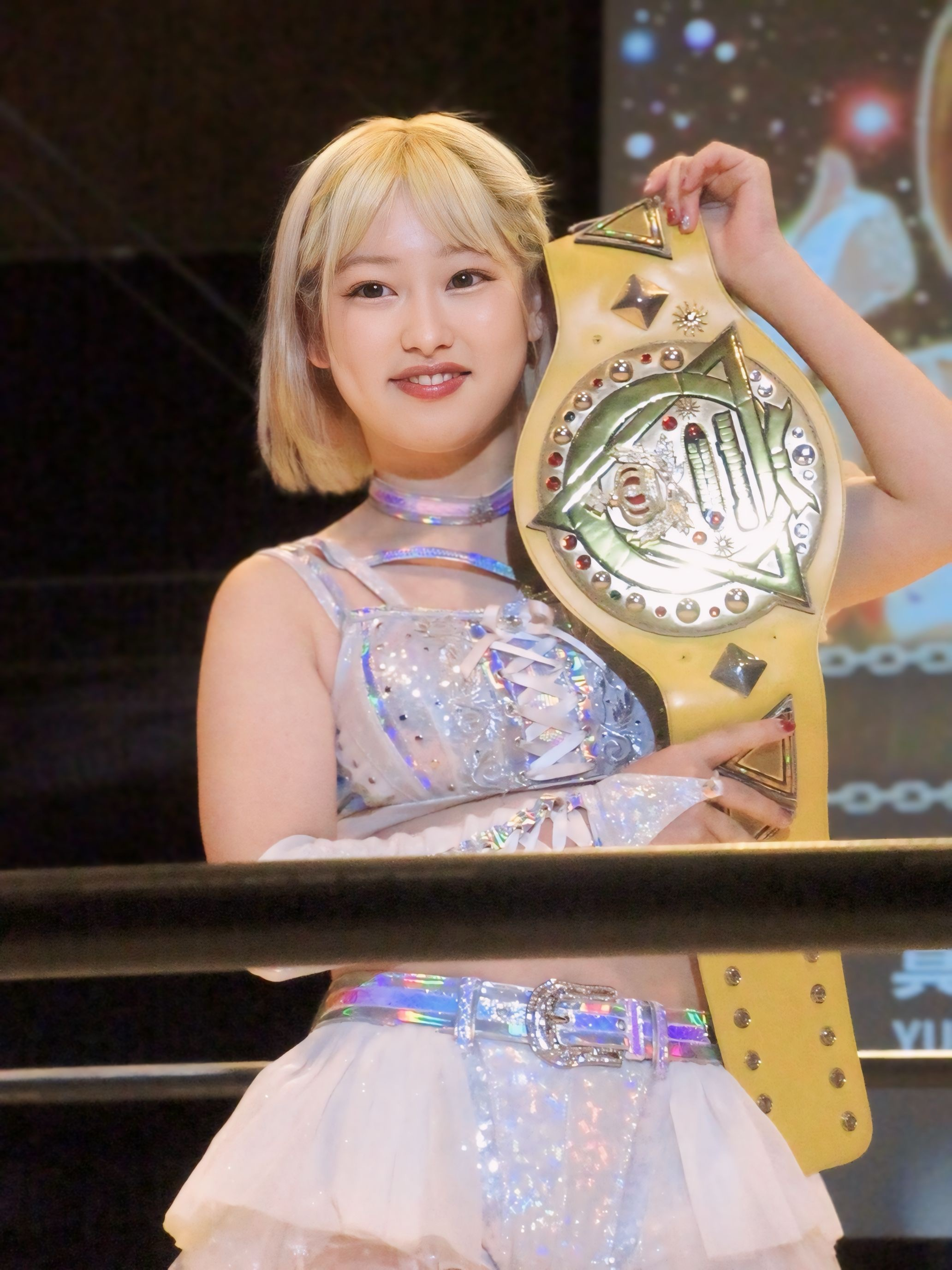
- Mashiro in May 2024

Personal information
- Born: April 18, 2001 (age 25) Kobe, Japan

Professional wrestling career
- Ring name(s): White; Yuki Mashiro
- Billed height: 153 cm (5 ft 0 in)
- Billed weight: 47 kg (104 lb)
- Trained by: Mio Shirai; Tsukushi
- Debut: 2020

Yuki Mashiro (ましろゆき, Mashiro Yuki) is a Japanese professional wrestler best known for her tenure with the Japanese promotion Ice Ribbon where she is a former ICE Cross Infinity Champion. She is also known for her work in the Japanese independent scene.

== Professional wrestling career ==
=== Independent circuit (2020–present) ===
Mashiro did some freelance work in the Japanese independent scene especially in men's promotion as a joshi talent. At 2AW Grand Slam in TKP Garden City Chiba, an event produced by Active Advance Pro Wrestling on November 14, 2021, she teamed up with Tsukushi to defeat Ayame Sasamura and Rina Shingaki. At 666/TTT Tama Pro Festa, an event produced by Wrestling of Darkness 666 in partnership with Total Triumph Team (TTT) on December 24, 2021, she teamed up with Nao Ishikawa in a losing effort against Tsukasa Fujimoto and Kaho Matsushita. At Seadlinnng Shin-Kiba Night! on February 21, 2022, she teamed up with Hiroyo Matsumoto and Itsuki Aoki to defeat Ayame Sasamura, Makoto and Riko Kaiju.

=== Ice Ribbon (2019–2022; 2023–present) ===
Mashiro made her professional wrestling debut at New Ice Ribbon #985 on August 17, 2019, under the name of White in an exhibition match where she fell short to Totoro Satsuki. Shortly after her debut, she competed in Tequila Saya's retirement match from New Ice Ribbon #1013/RibbonMania 2019 on December 31, a 44-person gauntlet match in which Saya faced the likes of Mashiro, Syuri, Momo Kohgo, Matsuya Uno, Ken Ohka, Lingerie Muto and many others into a draw. At Ice Ribbon/AWG Ice Ribbon and Actwres girl'Z Joint Show on November 16, 2020, Mashiro competed in a 6-on-2 handicap match where she teamed up with Ayumi Hayashi, Momo Tani, Rina Amikura, Yappy and Yoshiko Hasegawa to defeat Hamuko Hoshi and Tsukasa Fujimoto. At New Ice Ribbon #1128 on June 26, 2021, Mashiro competed in Matsuya Uno's retirement 14-person gauntlet match in which she alongside other notable opponents such as Akane Fujita, Mochi Miyagi, Risa Sera, Suzu Suzuki, Thekla went into a draw against Uno.

In October 2022, Mashiro announced she will retire from professional wrestling to focus on her personal development. She had her last match at Ribbonmania 2022 on December 31, where she fell short to Suzu Suzuki. She subsequently vacated the Triangle Ribbon Championship in the process.

== Championships and accomplishments ==
- Ice Ribbon
  - ICE×∞ Championship (1 time)
  - Triangle Ribbon Championship (2 times)
  - Ice Ribbon Year-End Award (2 times)
    - Rookie Award (2020, 2021)
- Pro Wrestling Illustrated
  - Ranked No. 190 of the top 250 female wrestlers in the PWI Women's 250 in 2025
