= Kazumi Shimouma =

Japanese professional wrestler

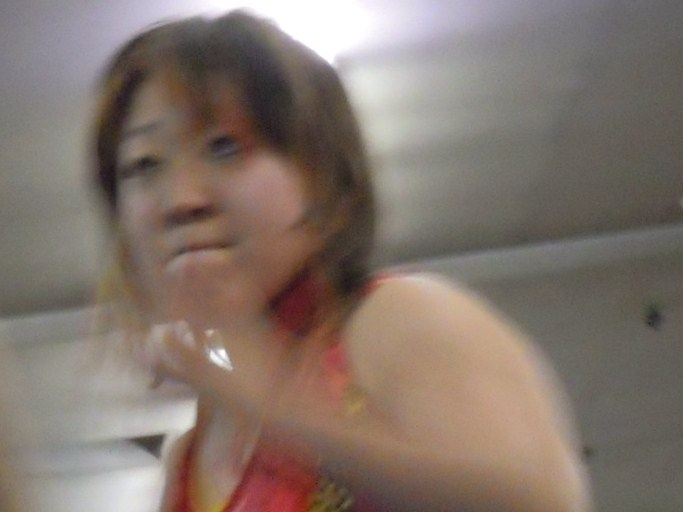
- Shimouma in October 2010

Personal information
- Born: October 29, 1977 (age 48) Setagaya, Japan

Professional wrestling career
- Ring name: Kazumi Shimouma
- Billed height: 156 cm (5 ft 1 in)
- Billed weight: 64 kg (141 lb)
- Trained by: Emi Sakura
- Debut: September 16, 2007
- Retired: 2010

Kazumi Shimouma (下馬一美, Shimouma Kazumi; born October 29, 1977) is a Japanese retired professional wrestler best known for her tenure with the Japanese promotions Ice Ribbon and NEO Japan Ladies Pro-Wrestling.

== Professional wrestling career ==
=== Ice Ribbon (2007–2010) ===
Shimouma made her professional wrestling debut in Ice Ribbon at Ice Ribbon #40 on September 16, 2007, falling short to Haruna Akagi in an exhibition match.

During her three-year tenure with the promotion, Shimouma chased for various championships owned by the company. At Ice Ribbon 158: Osaka Ribbon II on February 20, 2010, she teamed up with her "Passion Red" stable tag team partner Nanae Takahashi to defeat Meat Monsters (Hamuko Hoshi and Hiroyo Matsumoto). They dropped the titles two months later at Ice Ribbon 180: Golden Ribbon on May 3, 2010, to 385Myankie's (Jun Kasai and Miyako Matsumoto) in an intergender tag team match. Another championship she has held was the Triangle Ribbon Championship, title which she won at Ice Ribbon 202: Itabashi Tournament on July 19, 2010, by defeating the reigning champion Nanae Takahashi and Makoto in a three-way match. At Ice Ribbon New Ice Ribbon #240 on November 27, 2010, Shimouma competed twice. Firstly by successfully defending the Triangle Ribbon title against Emi Sakura and Nanae Takahashi, and secondly in a gauntlet match contested as part of a tournament to inaugurate the "Ice Ribbon Pupil Belt". She won the bout which also involved Chii Tomiya, Hamuko Hoshi, Hikari Minami, Hikaru Shida, Makoto, Minori Makiba, Nanae Takahashi, Riho, Tomomitsu Matsunaga and Tsukasa Fujimoto. She also took part in many match gimmicks. At Ice Ribbon New Ice Ribbon #225 on October 10, 2010, se competed in am 18-person battle royal won by Riho and also involving notable opponents, both male and female such as Jaki Numazawa, Hiragi Kurumi, Sayaka Obihiro, Takashi Sasaki and Yuko Miyamoto.

Shimouma retired from professional wrestling at RibbonMania 2010 on December 26, where she teamed up with Nanae Takahashi and Natsuki Taiyo in a losing effort against Emi Sakura, Hamuko Hoshi and Sayaka Obihiro as a result of a six-woman tag team match.

=== Independent scene (2008–2010) ===
Due to Ice Ribbon sharing business partnerships with various promotions, Shimouma briefly competed in several companies of the Japanese independent scene. One of them is Oz Academy, where she made her first appearance at OZ Academy/JJ21 Produce Hikyou Tanken, an event produced on March 7, 2010, where she teamed up with Passion Red stablemates Nanae Takahashi, Natsuki Taiyo, Passion Hotty and Passion Ray in a losing effort against Jungle Jack 21 (Aja Kong, Akino, Hiroyo Matsumoto, Ran Yu-Yu and Tomoka Nakagawa) in a Best Three Out Of Five Falls match. Another promotion in which she made several appearances is JWP Joshi Puroresu. Her last match for the promotion took place at JWP Revolution 2010 on December 12, where she teamed up with Nanae Takahashi and Passion Hotty in a losing effort against Hailey Hatred, Kaori Yoneyama and Sachie Abe. Shimouma also competed in NEO Japan Ladies Pro-Wrestling, making one of her last appearances at a house show promoted on October 31, 2010, where she competed in a battle royal won by Yoshiko Tamura and also involving Aya Yuuki, Tanny Mouse, Toshie Uematsu and Yuki Miyazaki.

== Championships and accomplishments ==
- Ice Ribbon
  - Triangle Ribbon Championship (1 time)
  - International Ribbon Tag Team Championship (1 time) – with Nanae Takahashi
