= Triangle Ribbon Championship =

Professional wrestling women's championship

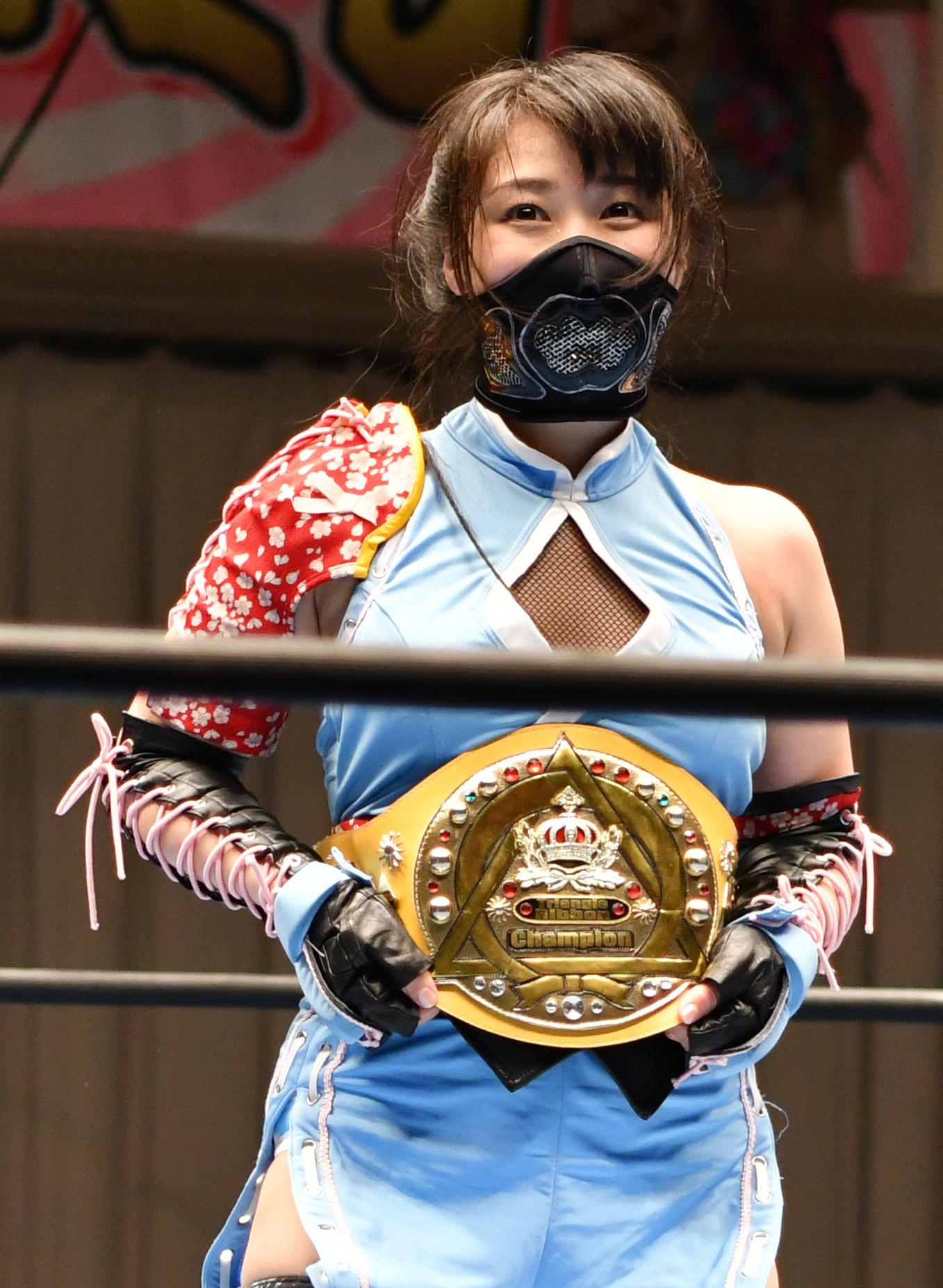
- Ai Shimizu with the Triangle Ribbon Championship belt in July 2016

Details
- Promotion: Ice Ribbon
- Date established: November 28, 2009
- Current champion: Kaho Matsushita
- Date won: November 8, 2026
Statistics
- First champion: Riho
- Most reigns: Neko Nitta (6 reigns)
- Longest reign: Neko Nitta (389 days)
- Shortest reign: Minoru Fujita and Yasu Urano (6 days)
- Oldest champion: Cherry (51 years and 10 months)
- Youngest champion: Riho (12 years, 5 months and 24 days)
- Heaviest champion: Hideki Suzuki (113 kg (249 lb))
- Lightest champion: Riho (28 kg (62 lb))

The Triangle Ribbon Championship (TRC) (トライアングルリボン王座, toraianguru ribon ōza) is a women's professional wrestling championship owned by the Ice Ribbon promotion. The championship was introduced on November 28, 2009, when Riho defeated Nanae Takahashi and Tsukasa Fujimoto to become the inaugural champion. Championship matches are contested in a three-way match format and have a 15-minute time limit, and the title is vacated in the event of a time limit draw. Though primarily contested for by female wrestlers, four male wrestlers, Ribbon Takanashi and Choun Shiryu and Minoru Fujita and Yasu Urano, have also held the title.

Like most professional wrestling championships, the title is won as a result of a scripted match. There have been a total of sixty-three reigns shared among thirty-eight wrestlers. The current champion is Kaho Matsushita, who is in her first reign.

== History ==
Riho was the first champion in the title's history. Neko Nitta holds the record for most reigns, with six. Nitta also holds the record for the longest reign, at 389 days, the record for the shortest reigns are held by Kakeru Sekiguchi and Minoru Fujita, who both held the title 6 days.

== Reigns ==
Key
No.	Overall reign number
Reign	Reign number for the specific champion
Days	Number of days held
Defenses	Number of successful defenses
+	Current reign is changing daily

No.	Champion	Championship change			Reign statistics			Notes	Ref.
No.	Champion	Date	Event	Location	Reign	Days	Defenses	Notes	Ref.
1	Riho	November 28, 2009	Ice Ribbon 137	Tokyo, Japan	1	114	1	Riho defeated Nanae Takahashi and Tsukasa Fujimoto in a three-way match to become the inaugural champion.	
2	Miyako Matsumoto	March 22, 2010	Ice Ribbon 169	Tokyo, Japan	1	26	0	This was a three-way match, also involving Kazumi Shimouma.	
3	Nanae Takahashi	April 17, 2010	Ice Ribbon 176: Itabashi Tournament	Tokyo, Japan	1	93	0	This was a three-way match, also involving Riho.	
4	Kazumi Shimouma	July 19, 2010	Ice Ribbon 202: Itabashi Tournament	Tokyo, Japan	1	145	1	This was a three-way match, also involving Makoto.	
5	Tsukasa Fujimoto	December 11, 2010	Ice Ribbon 244	Tokyo, Japan	1	81	0	This was a three-way match, also involving Hamuko Hoshi.	
—	Vacated	March 2, 2011	Ice Ribbon 269	Tokyo, Japan	—	—	—	The championship was vacated, when a title match ended with both Ray and Tsukasa Fujimoto pinning Chii Tomiya simultaneously.	
6	Tsukasa Fujimoto	March 5, 2011	Ice Ribbon 270	Tokyo, Japan	2	94	0	Fujimoto defeated Hikaru Shida and Makoto in a three-way match to win the vacant championship.	
7	Neko Nitta	June 7, 2011	Ice Ribbon 303	Tokyo, Japan	1	176	0	This was a three-way match, also involving Ray.	
8	Ribbon Takanashi	November 30, 2011	Ice Ribbon 347	Saitama, Japan	1	56	1	This was a three-way match, also involving Makoto Oishi.	
9	Neko Nitta	January 25, 2012	Ice Ribbon 362	Saitama, Japan	2	11	0	This was a three-way match, also involving Miyako Matsumoto.	
10	Miyako Matsumoto	February 5, 2012	Yokohama Ribbon	Kawasaki, Kanagawa, Japan	2	24	0	This was a three-way match, also involving Jun Kasai.	
11	Aiger	February 29, 2012	Ice Ribbon 371	Saitama, Japan	1	20	0	This was a three-way match, also involving Neko Nitta.	
12	Neko Nitta	March 20, 2012	Ice Ribbon March	Tokyo, Japan	3	187	2	This was a three-way match, also involving Sayaka Obihiro.	
13	Hailey Hatred	September 23, 2012	Knights of Ice Ribbon	Tokyo, Japan	1	104	2	This was a three-way match, also involving Shuu Shibutani.	
—	Vacated	January 5, 2013	New Year Ribbon 2013	Yokohama, Kanagawa, Japan	—	—	—	The championship was vacated, when Hailey Hatred's title defense against Makoto Oishi and Tsukasa Fujimoto ended in a fifteen-minute time limit draw.	
14	Miyako Matsumoto	February 11, 2013	Yokohama Ribbon	Yokohama, Kanagawa, Japan	3	102	1	Matsumoto defeated Mio Shirai and Tsukasa Fujimoto in a three-way tournament final to win the vacant championship.	
15	Neko Nitta	May 24, 2013	Yokohama Radiant Hall Tournament	Yokohama, Kanagawa, Japan	4	221	3	This was a three-way match, also involving Kurumi.	
16	Cherry	December 31, 2013	RibbonMania	Tokyo, Japan	1	89	1	This was a three-way match, also involving Command Bolshoi.	
17	Shuu Shibutani	March 30, 2014	Tokyo Ribbon	Tokyo, Japan	1	154	1	This was a three-way match, also involving Neko Nitta.	
18	Neko Nitta	August 31, 2014	Ice in Wonderland	Tokyo, Japan	5	85	0	This was a three-way match, also involving Leon.	
19	Choun Shiryu	November 24, 2014	Yokohama Ribbon V	Yokohama, Kanagawa, Japan	1	13	0	This was a three-way match, also involving Miyako Matsumoto.	
20	Neko Nitta	December 7, 2014	Gifu Ribbon	Gifu, Japan	6	389	8	This was a three-way match, also involving Konaka.	
—	Vacated	December 31, 2015	RibbonMania	Tokyo, Japan	—	—	—	The championship was vacated due to Neko Nitta retiring from professional wrestling.	
21	Cherry	March 12, 2016	Spring Ribbon	Yokohama, Kanagawa, Japan	2	53	1	Cherry defeated Kyuuri and Makoto in a three-way match to win the vacant championship.	
22	Kyuri	May 4, 2016	10th Anniversary Show	Yokohama, Kanagawa, Japan	1	60	0	This was a three-way match, also involving Misaki Ohata.	
23	Ai Shimizu	July 3, 2016	Summer Jumbo Ribbon	Tokyo, Japan	1	181	2	This was a three-way match, also involving Maruko Nagasaki.	
24	Manami Toyota	December 31, 2016	RibbonMania	Tokyo, Japan	1	176	2	This was a three-way match, also involving Maruko Nagasaki.	
25	Tsukasa Fujimoto	June 25, 2017	Yokohama Ribbon	Yokohama, Kanagawa, Japan	3	244	3	This was a three-way match, also involving Tsukushi.	
26	Hideki Suzuki	February 24, 2018	Yokohama Ribbon	Yokohama, Kanagawa, Japan	1	134	2	This was a three-way match, also involving Miyako Matsumoto.	
27	Akane Fujita	July 8, 2018	Summer Jumbo Ribbon	Tokyo, Japan	1	139	2	This was a three-way match, also involving Miyako Matsumoto.	
28	Choun Shiryu	November 24, 2018	Yokohama Ribbon	Yokohama, Kanagawa, Japan	2	37	1	This was a three-way match, also involving Matsuya Uno.	
29	Banny Oikawa	December 31, 2018	RibbonMania	Tokyo, Japan	1	121	0	This was a three-way match, also involving Miyako Matsumoto.	
30	Maya Yukihi	May 1, 2019	Golden Week - Night 1	Yokohama, Kanagawa, Japan	1	52	1	This was a three-way match, also involving Tsukasa Fujimoto.	
31	Tsukasa Fujimoto	June 22, 2019	Ice Ribbon 966	Saitama, Japan	1	23	0	This was a three-way match, also involving Tequila Saya.	
32	Miyako Matsumoto	July 15, 2019	Yokohama Ribbon	Yokohama, Kanagawa, Japan	4	61	0	This was a three-way match, also involving Hamuko Hoshi.	
33	Matsuya Uno	September 14, 2019	Yokohama Bunka Gymnasium III	Yokohama, Kanagawa, Japan	1	78	2	This was a three-way tag team match, where Uno teamed with Jiro Kuroshio and defeated the team of Hideki Suzuki and Ram Kaicho, and the team of Jun Kasai and Miyako Matsumoto to win the championship.	
34	Tequila Saya	December 1, 2019	Ice Ribbon 1010	Saitama, Japan	1	20	1	This was a three-way match, also involving Tae Honma.	
35	Tae Honma	December 21, 2019	Ice Ribbon 1014	Tokyo, Japan	1	232	2	This was a three-way match, also involving Kaori Yoneyama.	
36	Ram Kaicho	August 9, 2020	Ice Ribbon Yokohama Bunka Gymnasium Final	Yokohama, Kanagawa, Japan	1	83	2	This was a three-way match, also involving Choun Shiryu.	
37	Koju Takeda	October 31, 2020	666 Vol. 99 Halloween	Tokyo, Japan	1	8	0	This was a three-way match, also involving Fuminori Abe.	
38	Ram Kaicho	November 8, 2020	Ice Ribbon vs. Shinjuku Ni-chome Joshi Pro Wrestling (Evening Show)	Saitama, Japan	2	139	2	This was a three-way match, also involving Hiragi Kurumi.	
39	Matsuya Uno	March 27, 2021	Ice Ribbon New Ice Ribbon #1106 ~ Ice Ribbon March 2021	Tokyo, Japan	2	37	1	This was a three-way match, also involving Ibuki Hoshi.	
40	Thekla	May 3, 2021	Ice Ribbon New Ice Ribbon #1114 ~ Yokohama Ribbon 2021 GW	Yokohama, Japan	1	98	1	This was a three-way match, also involving Ibuki Hoshi.	
41	Totoro Satsuki	August 9, 2021	Ice Ribbon 1139 ~ Ice Ribbon 15th Anniversary	Yokohama, Japan	1	69	0	This was a three-way match, also involving Ram Kaicho.	
42	Rina Shingaki	October 17, 2021	Ice Ribbon 1152 In 176BOX	Osaka, Japan	1	27	0	This was a three-way match, also involving Miku Aono.	
43	Maika Ozaki	November 13, 2021	Ice Ribbon 1157	Tokyo, Japan	1	64	1	This was a three-way match, also involving Totoro Satsuki.	
44	Yuki Mashiro	January 16, 2022	Ice Ribbon 1173	Tokyo, Japan	1	349	6	This was a three-way match, also involving Miyako Matsumoto.	
—	Vacated	December 31, 2022	Ribbonmania 2022	Tokyo, Japan	—	—	—	The championship was vacated after Mashiro retired from professional wrestling.	
45	Yuki Mashiro	March 23, 2024	Ice Ribbon New Ice Ribbon #1337 ~ Ice Ribbon March 2024	Tokyo, Japan	2	126	3	Defeated Makoto and Kaho Matsushita in a three-way match to win the vacant title.	
46	Kaori Yoneyama	July 27, 2024	Ice Ribbon New Ice Ribbon #1360 Yokohama Ribbon 2024 ~ July	Yokohama, Japan	1	12	0	This was a three-way match, also involving Matsuzawa-san.	
—	Vacated	August 8, 2024	—	—	—	—	—		
47	Nanami	August 11, 2024	YMZ Gokigen Kawasaki #86	Kawasaki, Japan	1	13	0	Defeated Cherry and Matsuzawa-san in a three-way match to win the vacant title.	
48	Kyuri	August 24, 2024	Ice Ribbon New Ice Ribbon #1366 ~ Ice In Wonderland 2024	Tokyo, Japan	2	171	1	This was a three-way match also involving Saran.	
49	Kaori Yoneyama	February 11, 2025	Ice Ribbon New Ice Ribbon #1400	Tokyo, Japan	2	55	1	This was a three-way match also involving Arisa Shinose.	
50	Minoru Fujita	April 7, 2025	Gokigen Pro Wrestling Matsuzawa-san Debut 6th Anniversary	Kawasaki, Kanagawa, Japan	1	6	0	This was a three-way match also involving Matsuzawa-san.	
51	Kakeru Sekiguchi	April 13, 2025	Gokigen Pro Gokigen April	Kawasaki, Kanagawa, Japan	1	6	0	This was a three-way match also involving Kaori Yoneyama.	
52	Yasu Urano	April 19, 2025	Gokigen Pro Gokigen Easter	Kawasaki, Kanagawa, Japan	1	39	0	This was a three-way match also involving Kaori Yoneyama.	
53	Minoru Fujita	May 28, 2025	Gokigen Pro Hataage	Tokyo, Japan	2	59	1	This was a three-way match also involving Rina Yamashita.	
—	Vacated	July 26, 2025	Ice Ribbon New Ice Ribbon #1433	Yokohama, Kanagawa, Japan	—	—	—	The championship was vacated when Minoru Fujita's title defense against Akane Fujita and Satsuki Totoro ended in a fifteen-minute time limit draw.	
54	Nanami Hatano	August 4, 2025	Gokigen Pro Amistad #7	Tokyo, Japan	2	82	2	Defeated Kaori Yoneyama and Matsuzawa-san in a three-way match to win the vacant title. Hatano was previously known mononymously as Nanami.	
55	Makoto	October 25, 2025	Gokigen Pro Amistad #15	Kawasaki, Japan	1	67	0	This was a three-way match also involving Kaori Yoneyama.	
56	Kaori Yoneyama	December 31, 2025	Ice Ribbon #1464 ~ RibbonMania 2025	Tokyo, Japan	3	1	0	This was a three-way match also involving Mase Hiiro.	
57	Miran	January 1, 2026	Gokigen Pro Wrestling In Ita #6 Oshogatsu	Tokyo, Japan	1	72	0	This was a three-way match also involving Chie Ozora.	
58	Cherry	March 14, 2026	Gokigen Pro Gokigen Amistad #20	Kawasaki, Japan	3	23	1	This was a three-way match also involving Matsuzawa-san.	
59	Kaori Yoneyama	April 6, 2026	Gokigen Pro Gokigen Amistad #21	Kawasaki, Japan	4	<1	0	Yoneyama won the title post main-event, during a series of games involving all participants in the show.	
60	Makoto	April 6, 2026	Gokigen Pro Gokigen Amistad #21	Kawasaki, Japan	2	54	0	Makoto won the title post main-event, during a series of games involving all participants in the show.	
61	Akane Fujita	May 30, 2026	Ice Ribbon 1492	Saitama, Japan	2	21	1	This was a three-way match also involving Tsukina Umino.	
—	Vacated	June 20, 2026	Ice Ribbon 1496 Hataage 20th Anniversary	Tokyo, Japan	—	—	—	The championship was vacated when Akane Fujita's title defense against Tsukina Umino and Arisa Shinose ended in a fifteen-minute time limit-draw. The match was also disputed for Umino's FantastICE Championship.	
62	Hikari Minami	July 26, 2026	Ice Ribbon New Ice Ribbon #1504	Yokohama, Kanagawa, Japan	1	105	1	Defeated Kaori Yoneyama and Mase Hiiro in a three-way match for the vacant title.	
63	Kaho Matsushita	November 8, 2026	Ice Ribbon New Ice Ribbon #1526	Tokyo, Japan	1	14+	0	This was a three-way match also involving Yuuka.	

== Combined reigns ==
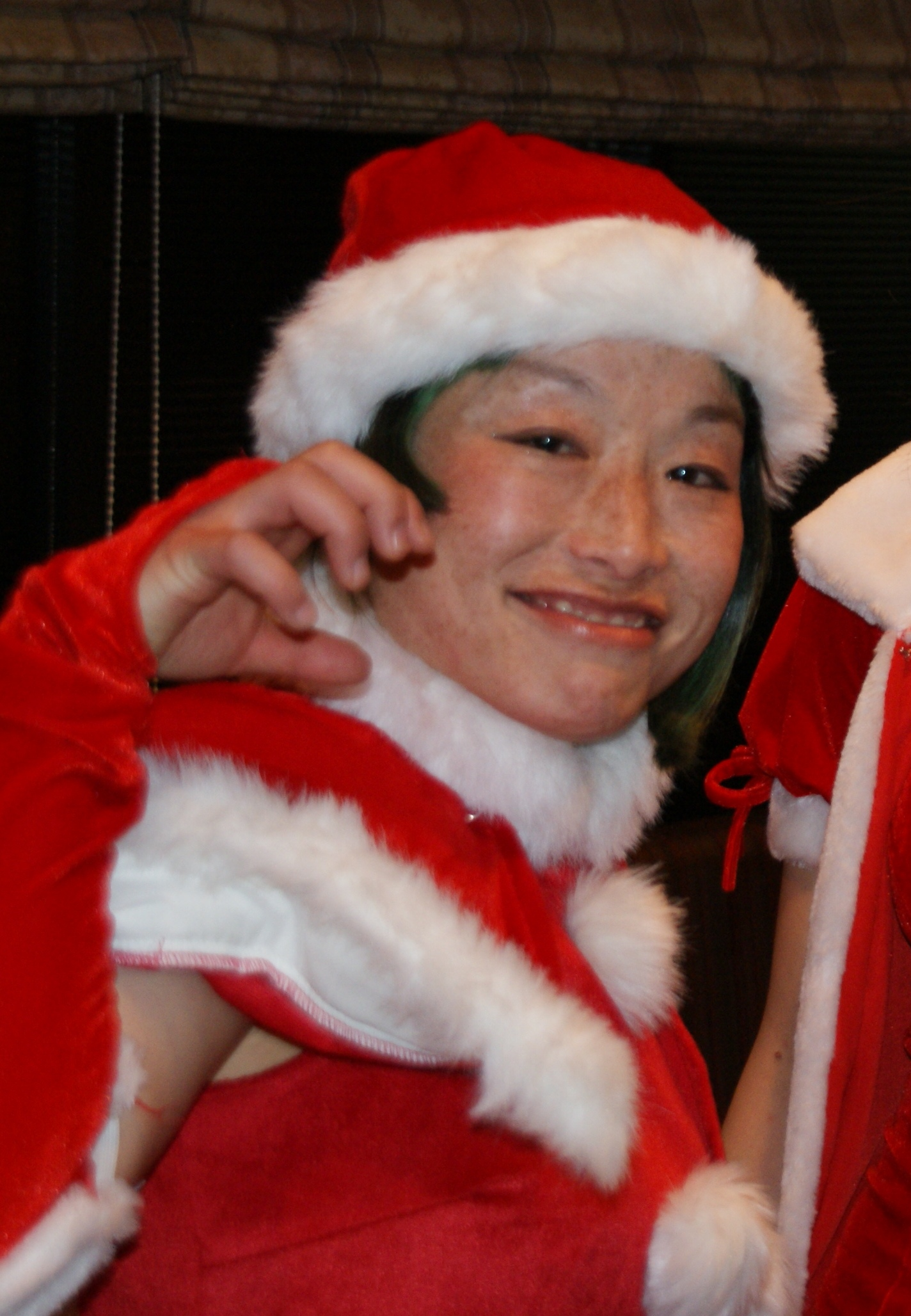
Neko Nitta, record six-time Triangle Ribbon Champion

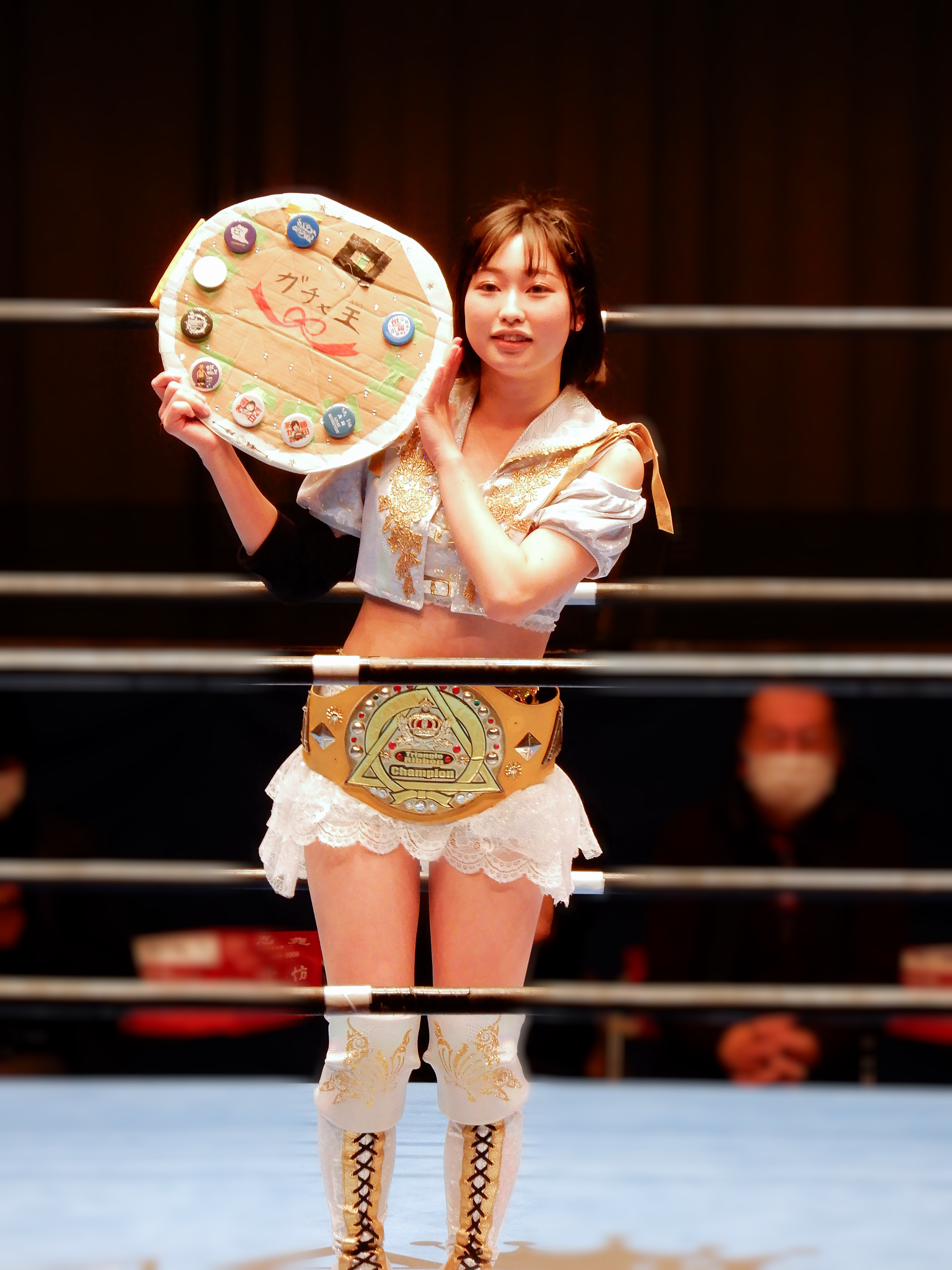
Former two-time champion, Yuki Mashiro with the current title design.

As of November 22, 2026

†	Indicates the current champion

Rank	Wrestler	No. of reigns	Combined defenses	Combined days
1	Neko Nitta	6	13	1,069
2	Yuki Mashiro	2	9	475
3	Tsukasa Fujimoto	4	4	442
4	Tae Honma	1	2	232
5	Kyuri	2	1	231
6	Ram Kaicho	2	4	222
7	Miyako Matsumoto	4	1	213
8	Ai Shimizu	1	2	181
9	Manami Toyota	1	2	176
10	Cherry	3	3	165
11	Akane Fujita	2	3	160
12	Shuu Shibutani	1	1	154
13	Kazumi Shimouma	1	1	145
14	Hideki Suzuki	1	2	134
15	Makoto	2	0	121
16	Banny Oikawa	1	0	121
17	Matsuya Uno	2	3	115
18	Riho	1	1	114
19	Hikari Minami	1	1	105
20	Hailey Hatred	1	2	104
21	Thekla	1	1	98
22	Nanami Hatano	2	2	95
23	Nanae Takahashi	1	0	93
24	Miran	1	0	72
25	Totoro Satsuki	1	0	69
26	Kaori Yoneyama	4	1	68
27	Minoru Fujita	2	1	65
28	Maika Ozaki	1	1	64
29	Masa Takanashi	1	1	56
30	Maya Yukihi	1	1	52
31	Choun Shiryu	2	1	50
32	Yasu Urano	1	0	39
33	Rina Shingaki	1	0	27
34	Aiger	1	0	20
34	Tequila Saya	1	1	20
36	Kaho Matsushita †	1	0	14+
37	Koju Takeda	1	0	8
38	Kakeru Sekiguchi	1	0	6
