= Tae Honma =

Japanese professional wrestler

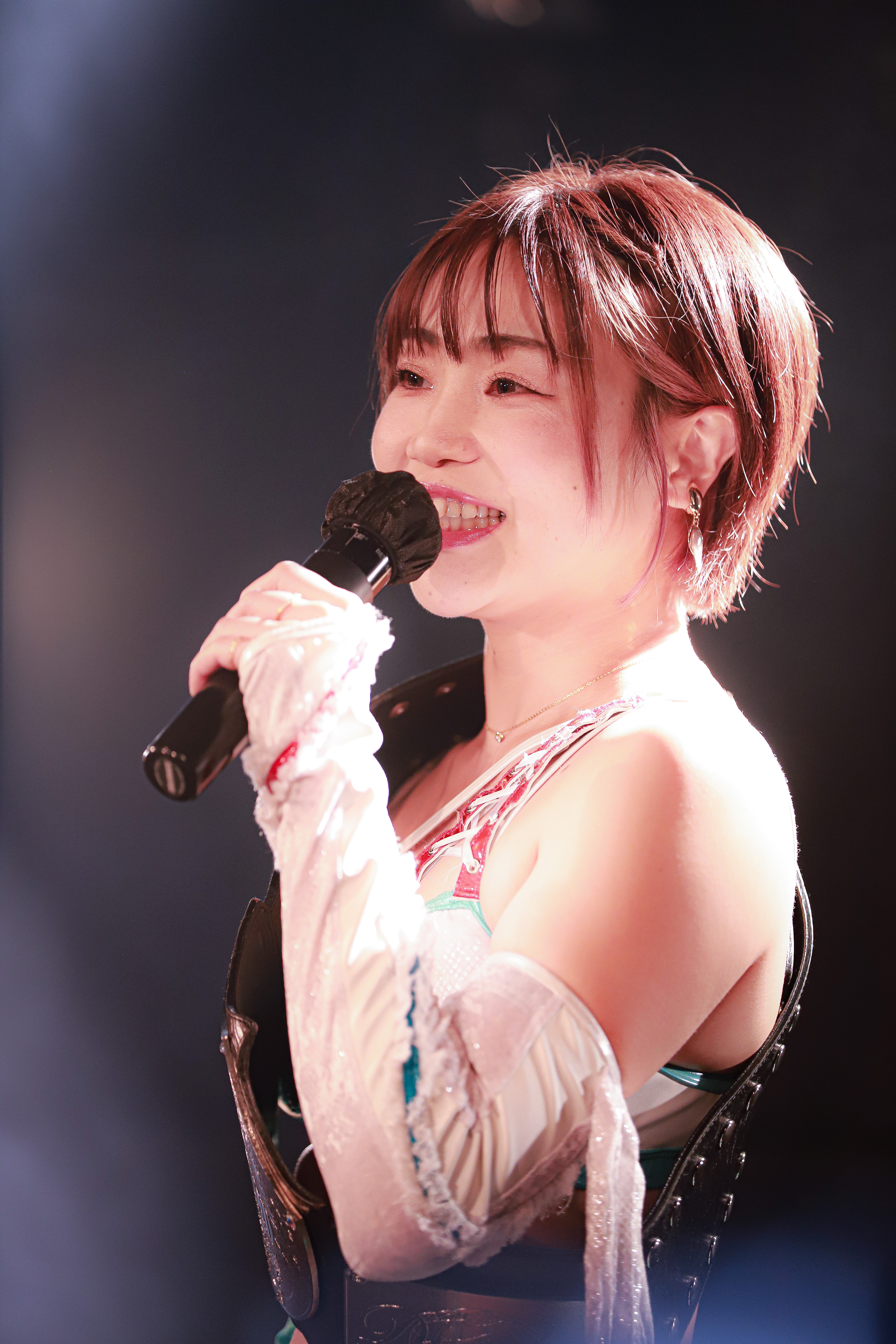
- Honma in 2023

Personal information
- Born: April 20, 1985 (age 41) Toyoyama, Aichi, Japan

Professional wrestling career
- Ring name: Tae Honma
- Billed height: 156 cm (5 ft 1 in)
- Trained by: Yuna Manase
- Debut: 2015
- Retired: 2025

Tae Honma (本間多恵, Honma Tae) is a Japanese retired professional wrestler best known for her tenure with the Japanese promotions Ice Ribbon and Actwres girl'Z.

== Professional wrestling career ==
=== Independent circuit (2015–2025) ===
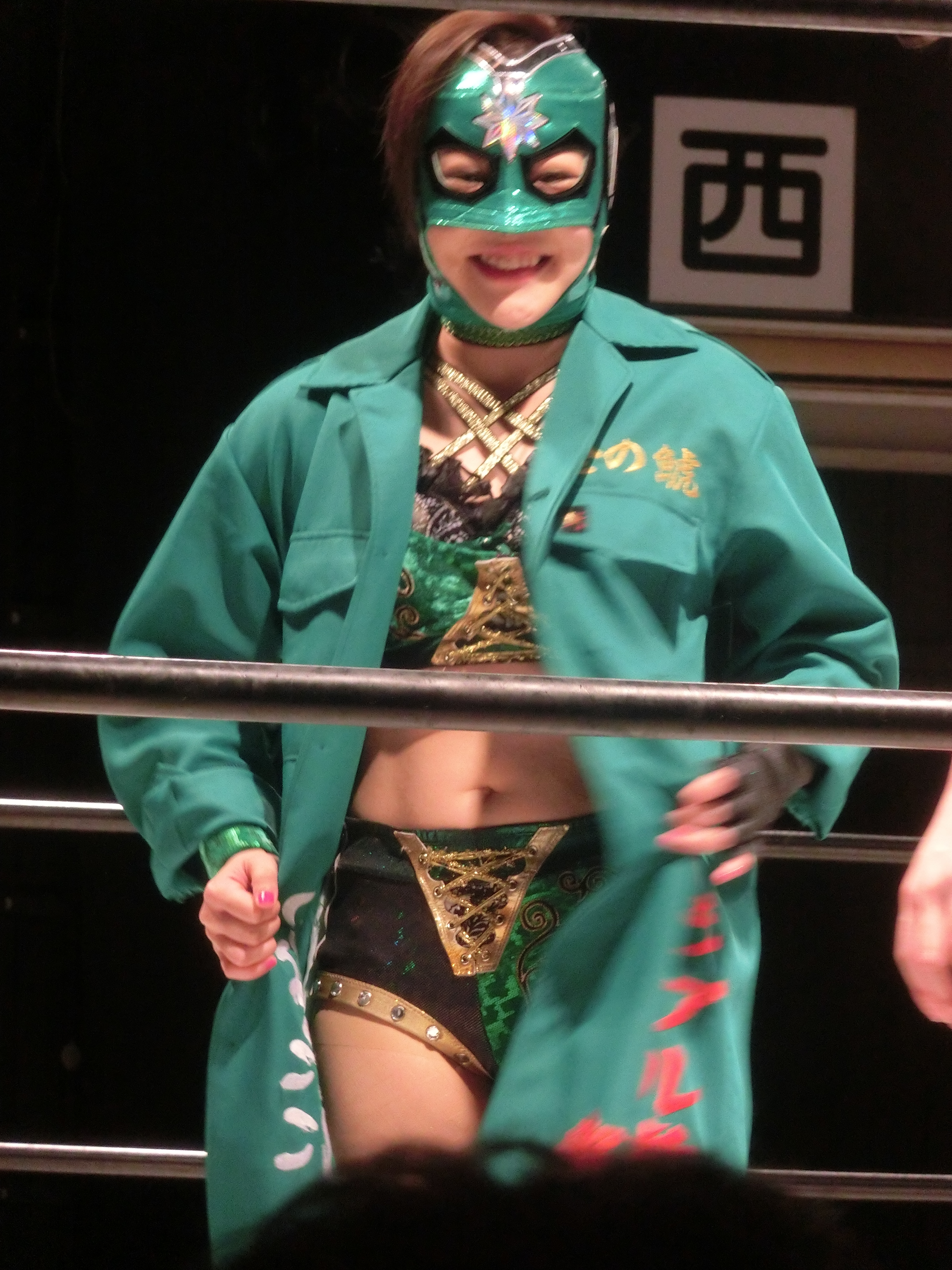
Honma seldomly competed under mask, being shown here at Fukumen Mania in June 2019.

As a freelancer, Honma is known for competing in multiple promotions of the Japanese independent scene. At The 45th Anniversary of All Japan Pro Wrestling on August 27, 2017, she teamed up with Miyuki Takase in a losing effort against Natsumi Maki and Saori Anou. At Oz Academy Plum Hanasaku 2018 ~ OZ No Kuni In Nagoya on August 19, 2018, she teamed up with Tsubasa Kuragaki to defeat Aoi Kizuki and Sae. At WAVE Nagoya WAVE ~Kin Shachi~ Vol. 18, an event promoted by pro Wrestling Wave on September 30, 2018, Honma teamed up with Miyuki Takase in a losing effort against Cherry and Rina Yamashita. On the second night of the Wrestle-1's W-1 Cherry Blossom Tour on April 7, 2019, Honma teamed up with Saori Anou in a losing effort against Himeka Arita and Reika Saiki. At PURE-J Pure Slam Vol. 3, an event promoted by Pure-J on September 23, 2019, she teamed up with Leon to defeat Hanako Nakamori and Moeka Haruhi. At JTO House, an event promoted by Professional Wrestling Just Tap Out on December 18, 2019, Honma teamed up with Maika to defeat Tomoka Inaba and Nao Kakuta. At 2AW Grand Slam In 2AW Square, an event promoted by Active Advance Pro Wrestling on March 28, 2021, Honma teamed up with Miku Aono to unsuccessfully challenge 3A (Ayame Sasamura and Rina Shingaki) for the World Woman Pro-Wrestling Diana Tag Team Championship.

==== Consejo Mundial de Lucha Libre (2019) ====
Honma worked as a joshi talent for Consejo Mundial de Lucha Libre during the CMLL Torneo Nacional de Parejas Increíbles starting with April 19, 2019 where she teamed up with Kaho Kobayashi and Princesa Sugehit to defeat Dalys la Caribeña, La Amapola and Reyna Isis. On April 23, she teamed up with La Guerrera and Lluvia in a losing effort against Dalys la Caribena, La Comandante and Metálico as a result of a best two out of three falls six-man tag team match. The final show in which she competed was the 63. Aniversario de Arena México on April 26 where she teamed up with Kaho Kobayashi and Marcela to defeat La Amapola, La Comandante and La Seductora.

=== Actwres girl'Z (2015–2025) ===
Honma made her professional wrestling debut at AgZ Prologue, the first-ever event promoted by the Actwres girl'Z promotion on May 31, 2015, where she defeated Nao Kakuta. At AgZ Act 25 on October 15, 2017, she unsuccessfully challenged Saori Anou for the Princess of Pro-Wrestling Championship. She is also known for competing in the Beginning brand of the promotion. At a house show promoted on November 19, 2019, she teamed up with Saki to defeat Mari and Misa Matsui.

=== Ice Ribbon (2017–2025) ===
Another promotion in which Honma wrestled is Ice Ribbon. She made her first appearance at New Ice Ribbon #845 on October 29, 2017, where she teamed up with Natsumi Maki to defeat Kyuri and Matsuya Uno. She is also known for competing in gauntlet matches such as the one from Tequila Saya's retirement show from December 31, 2019, at New Ice Ribbon #1013, a 44-person match also involving Syuri, Itsuki Aoki, Manami Toyota, Lingerie Muto, Tsukasa Fujimoto, Maika Ozaki, Ken Ohka, Hiragi Kurumi and many others. At Ice Ribbon & Actwres girl'Z Joint Show on November 16, 2020, Honma unsuccessfully challenged Suzu Suzuki for the ICE Cross Infinity Championship.

== Championships and accomplishments ==
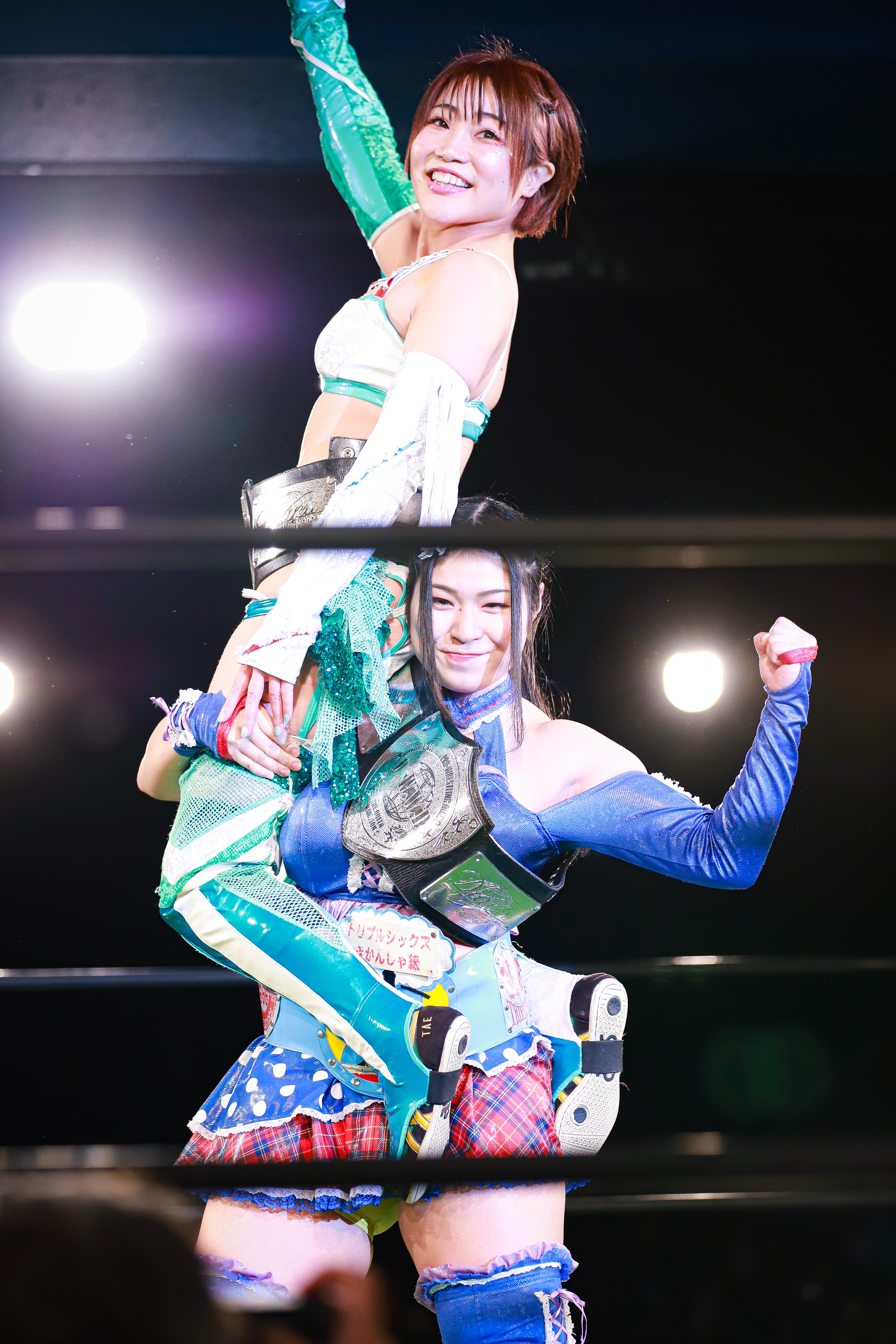
Honma is a one-time Diana Tag Team Champion

- Actwres girl'Z
  - AWG Tag Team Championship (1 time, inaugural) – with Maika Ozaki
  - AWG Tag Team Title Tournament (2021)
- DDT Pro-Wrestling
  - Ironman Heavymetalweight Championship (1 time)
- Ice Ribbon
  - Triangle Ribbon Championship (1 time)
  - Ice Ribbon Year-End Award (1 time)
    - Best Enemy Award (2018)
- Pro Wrestling Wave
  - Wave Tag Team Championship (2 times) – with Maika Ozaki
  - Dual Shock Wave (2024, 2025) – with Maika Ozaki
- World Woman Pro-Wrestling Diana
  - World Woman Pro-Wrestling Diana Tag Team Championship (1 time) – with Maika Ozaki
