= Rina Shingaki =

Japanese professional wrestler (born 1998)

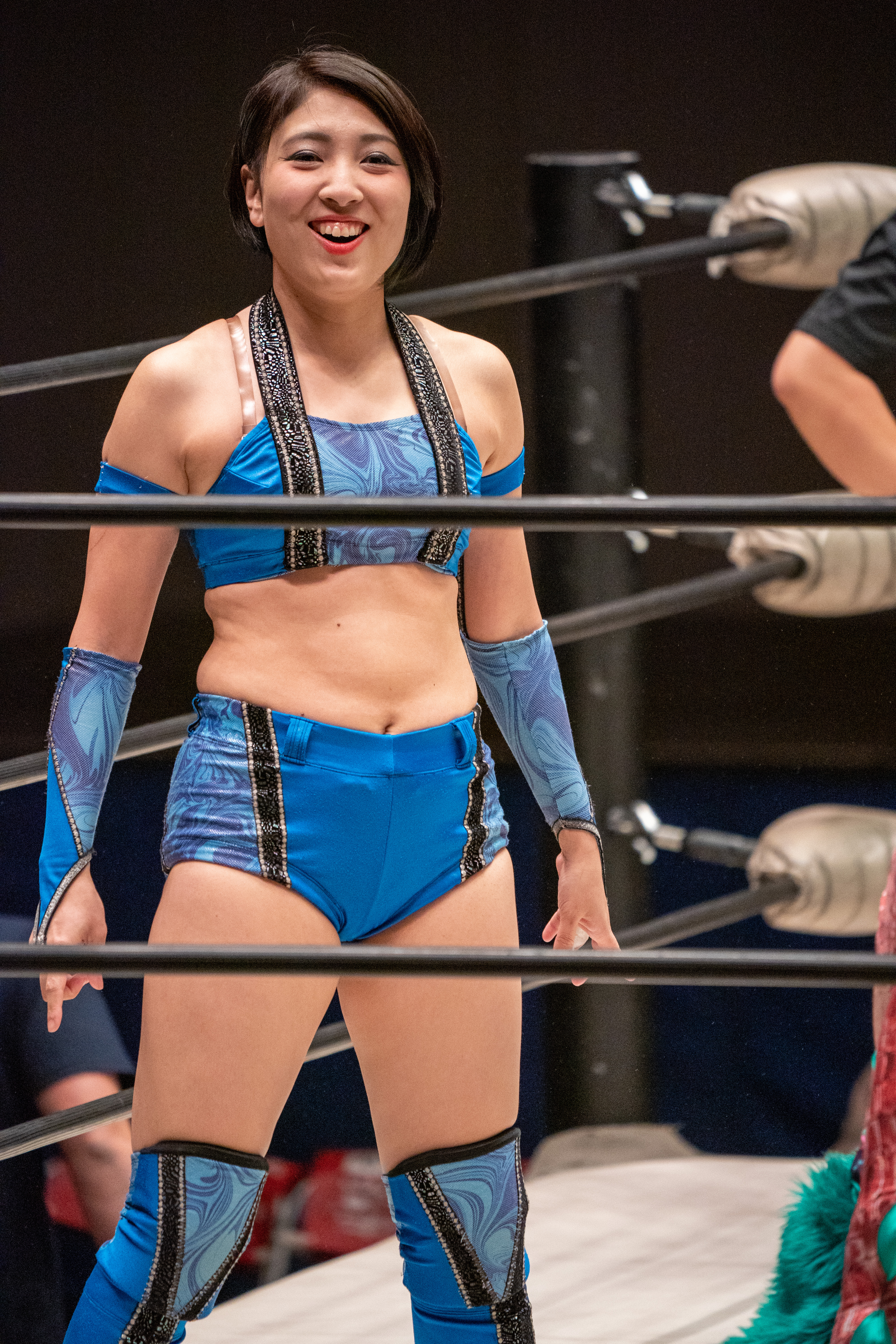
- Shingaki in March 2020

Personal information
- Born: November 23, 1998 (age 27) Ichikikushikino, Japan

Professional wrestling career
- Ring name: Rina Shingaki
- Billed height: 161 cm (5 ft 3 in)
- Billed weight: 57 kg (126 lb)
- Debut: 2018
- Retired: 2021

Rina Shingaki (進垣リナ, Shingaki Rina) is a retired Japanese professional wrestler best known for her tenure with the Japanese promotion Ice Ribbon where she is a former Triangle Ribbon Champion.

== Professional wrestling career ==
=== Independent circuit (2018-2021) ===
Shingaki made her professional wrestling debut at Kaientai Dojo 16th Anniversary Club-K Super Evolution 16 on April 22, 2018, where she fell short to Ayame Sasamura.

As a freelancer, Shingaki is known for competing in various promotions. At TJPW The Sparkling Girl Will Fly To Hakata, an event promoted by Tokyo Joshi Pro Wrestling on March 31, 2019, she teamed up with Mizuki to defeat Marika Kobashi and Miu Watanabe. At ZERO1 Office T 30th Anniversary Celebration, an event promoted by Pro Wrestling Zero1 on April 11, 2019, she fell short to Hiroe Nagahama. At a house show promoted by Pure-J on July 10, 2019, Shingaki unsuccessfully challenged Manami Katsu in a singles match. At Oz Academy Fragment Of Soul from December 15, 2019, she teamed up with Syuri to unsuccessfully challenge Mission K4 (Akino and Kaho Kobayashi) for the Oz Academy Tag Team Championship. At RibbonMania 2019, an event promoted by Ice Ribbon on December 31, 2019, she participated in a 44-person gauntlet match in which the retiring Tequila Saya went into a draw with her, Risa Sera, Suzu Suzuki, Manami Toyota, Ken Ohka, Tsukushi, Tsukasa Fujimoto, Itsuki Aoki, Banny Oikawa, Matsuya Uno, Yuki Mashiro and many others.

==== Pro Wrestling Wave (2019-2021) ====
Shingaki is also a part of Pro Wrestling Wave's roster. At the 2020 edition of the Dual Shock Wave tournament, she teamed up with Ayame Sasamura and defeated Nagisa Nozaki and Saki and Boss To Mammy (Yumi Ohka and Mio Momono) in a first round match. They then fell short to the next bout against Itsuki Aoki and Rin Kadokura and Luminous (Haruka Umesaki and Miyuki Takase). At WAVE Kabuki-cho Week Ender on November 21, 2020, she unsuccessfully challenged Nagisa Nozaki for the Wave Single Championship.

== Championships and accomplishments ==
- Best Body Japan Pro-Wrestling
  - BBW Women's Championship (1 time)
  - BBW Super Bodyweight Championship (1 time)
- Ice Ribbon
  - Triangle Ribbon Championship (1 time)
- World Woman Pro-Wrestling Diana
  - World Woman Pro-Wrestling Diana Tag Team Championship (1 time) – with Ayame Sasamura
