= Oz Academy =

Japanese professional wrestling promotion

- Acronym: Oz
- Founded: June 21, 1998
- Style: Joshi puroresu Hardcore wrestling
- Headquarters: Shinjuku, Tokyo
- Founder: Mayumi Ozaki
- Website: oz-academy.com

Oz Academy (OZアカデミー, OZ Akademī) is a Japanese joshi puroresu or women's professional wrestling promotion founded by Mayumi Ozaki. The promotion's full official name is Oz Academy Women's Professional Wrestling (OZアカデミー女子プロレス, OZ Akademī Joshi Puroresu). In addition to the contracted members of the roster, Oz Academy has also employed some of the top freelancers in all of joshi puroresu, including Ayumi Kurihara, Hiroyo Matsumoto, Manami Toyota and Tomoka Nakagawa. The promotion has a television deal with Gaora.

== History ==
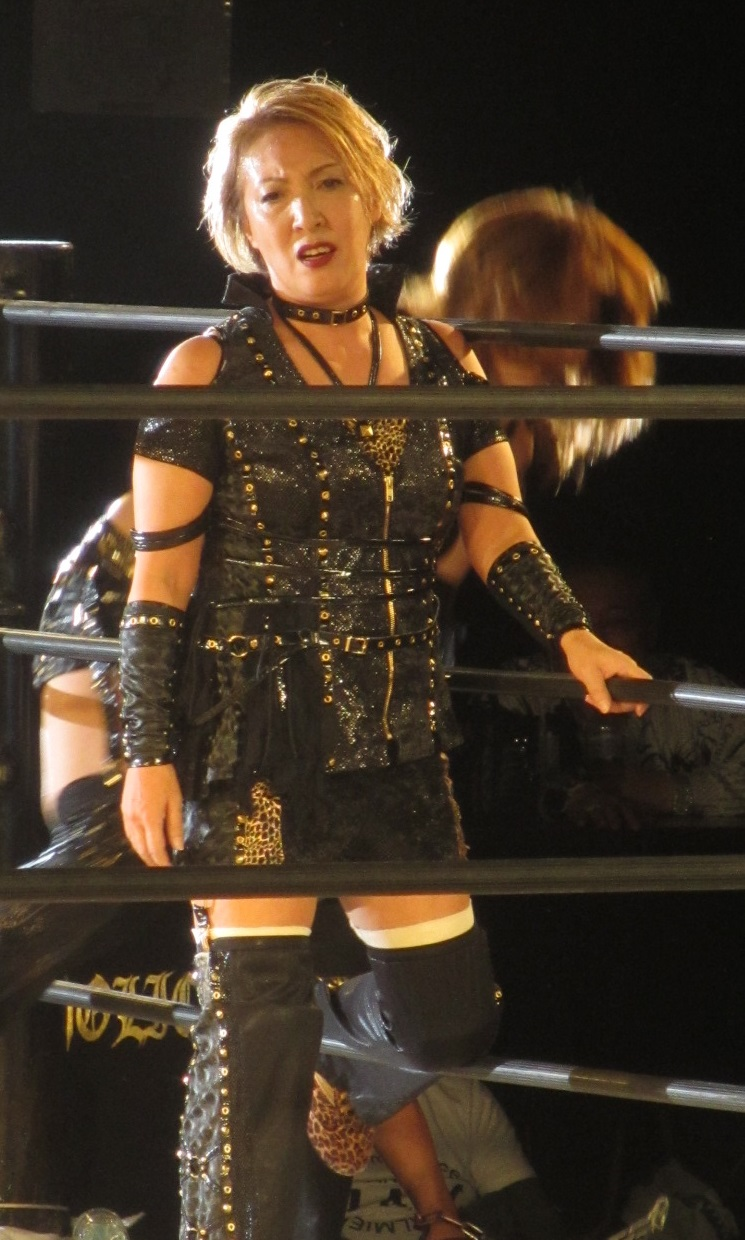
Oz Academy founder Mayumi Ozaki

While working in the Gaea Japan promotion in mid-90s, Ozaki formed the villainous Oz Academy stable with Chikayo Nagashima, Rieko Amano and Sugar Sato, eventually opening a training school under the same name. Oz Academy eventually started promoting sporadic independent events, featuring members of the stable and Ozaki's trainees, with the first event held on June 21, 1998. Following the folding of Gaea Japan in 2005, Ozaki turned Oz Academy into a full promotion with a full schedule of approximately one to two events per month, while also recruiting veteran wrestlers Aja Kong, Dynamite Kansai and Sonoko Kato to serve as the backbone of the promotion. Oz Academy remained without championships for nearly nine years, before introducing the Oz Academy Openweight Championship in March 2007 and the Oz Academy Tag Team Championship in July 2008.

Mayumi Ozaki has always been a focal point of Oz Academy events and storylines, with different variations of her original Oz Academy stable trying to dominate and keep themselves on top of the promotion. The stable has gone under many different names, including D-Fix, Ozaki-gun, Ozaki-gundan, and currently, Seikigun. At the end of each year, Oz Academy allows its fans to vote on different awards, including MVP of the Year, Singles Match of the Year and Tag Team Match of the Year, which are then presented to the winners at the "Best Wizard" award ceremony. Oz Academy is based in Shinjuku, Tokyo and holds most of its events in Shinjuku Face. The promotion itself considers the formation of the stable in 1996 as its starting point and celebrated its 20th anniversary on November 13, 2016.

== Roster ==
=== Wrestlers ===
Ring name	Real name	Unit	Notes
Akino	Mika Akino	Mission K4	
Hiroyo Matsumoto	Unknown	Beast Friend	Freelancer; Oz Academy Openweight Champion; Oz Academy Tag Team Champion
Itsuki Aoki	Aika Aoki	Unaffiliated	
Jaguar Yokota	Rimi Yokota	Unaffiliated	World Woman Pro-Wrestling Diana
Kakeru Sekiguchi	Unknown	Mission K4	Freelancer
Kaori Yoneyama	Kaori Yoneyama	Beast Friend	Freelancer; Owner of YMZ Pro Wrestling
Kohaku	Hana Iwaki	Unaffiliated	Freelancer
Maya Yukihi	Unknown	Seiki-gun	Freelancer
Mayumi Ozaki	Mayumi Ozaki	Seiki-gun	Owner
Ram Kaicho	Ram Kaicho	Unaffiliated	
Rina Yamashita	Unknown	Unaffiliated	Freelancer
Ryo Mizunami	Ayane Mizumura	Unaffiliated	Freelancer; Oz Academy Pioneer 3-Way Champion
Saori Anou	Unknown	Seiki-gun	World Wonder Ring Stardom
Sonoko Kato	Sonoko Kato	Mission K4	
Tsubasa Kuragaki	Yasuko Kuragaki	Unaffiliated	Freelancer

=== Other on-air personnel ===
Ring name	Real name	Notes
Police	Unknown	Seiki-gun

== Referees ==
Ring name	Real name	Notes
Sachiko Ito	Sachiko Ito	Referee
Mio	Unknown	Referee; Affiliated with Seiki-gun

== Broadcast team ==
Ring name	Real name	Notes
Dynamite Kansai	Chieko Suzuki	Ring announcer
Hiroyuki Nakamura	Unknown	Ring announcer

=== Notable alumni ===
Ring name	Real name	Notes
Alex Lee	Irena Janjic	
Aoi Kizuki	Aoi Kizuki	
Ayumi Kurihara	Ayumi Kurihara	Retired on August 4, 2013
Carlos Amano	Rieko Amano	Retired on August 17, 2014
Cherry	Unknown	
Chikayo Nagashima	Chikayo Nagashima	Resigned on August 23, 2015
Devil Masami	Masami Yoshida	Retired on December 30, 2008
Dynamite Kansai	Chieko Suzuki	Retired on December 11, 2016
Kurumi	Hiragi Kurumi	
Hiren	Yurie Kaneko	Retired on November 8, 2011
Kaori Nakayama	Kaori Nakayama	Retired on October 23, 2002
Kaoru	Kaoru Maeda	
Kaoru Ito	Kaoru Ito	
Manami Toyota	Manami Toyota	Retired on November 3, 2017.
Mika Nishio	Mika Nishio	Retired from wrestling in April 2006, continued working as a manager until March 20, 2016, when she retired due to pregnancy
Nao Komatsu	Nao Komatsu	Injured on December 9, 2012
Ran Yu-Yu	Tomoko Miyaguchi	Retired on December 9, 2012
Rie	Rie Nakamura	
Sakura Hirota	Sakura Hirota	
Sugar Sato	Toshie Sato	Retired on June 26, 2005
Takako Inoue	Takako Inoue	
Tomoka Nakagawa	Tomoka Nakagawa	Retired on December 4, 2014
Yuu	Unknown	Retied on December 28, 2025

== Notable guests ==
- Akane Fujita
- Aoi Kizuki
- Chihiro Hashimoto
- Kazumi Shimouma
- Kohaku
- Hikari Shimizu
- Hiroe Nagahama
- Mika Iwata
- Miku Aono
- Misa Matsui
- Miyuki Takase
- Mochi Miyagi
- Momoka Hanazono
- Rabbit Miu
- Ram Kaicho
- Riko Kaiju
- Rina Yamashita
- Rydeen Hagane
- Ryo Mizunami
- Sae
- Sawako Shimono
- Tae Honma
- Tequila Saya
- Tomoko Watanabe
- Totoro Satsuki
- Yako Fujigasaki
- Ibuki Hoshi

== Championships ==
Championship	Current champion(s)	Reign	Date won	Days held	Location	Notes
Oz Academy Openweight Championship	Hiroyo Matsumoto	2	February 8, 2026	190+	Tokyo, Japan	Defeated Saori Anou at OZ Academy OZ 30th & Ozaki 40th: Blooming With Pride.
Oz Academy Tag Team Championship	Jet Black Oimokabuki (Saori Anou and Unagi Sayaka)	1 (2, 1)	August 16, 2026	1+	Tokyo, Japan	Defeated Gojizones United (Hiroyo Matsumoto and Zones) at OZ Academy OZ 30th & Ozaki 40th: Plum No Hanasaku OZ No Kuni.
Oz Academy Pioneer 3-Way Championship	Kakeru	2	August 16, 2026	1+	Tokyo, Japan	Defeated Ryo Mizunami and Akino at OZ Academy OZ 30th & Ozaki 40th: Plum No Hanasaku OZ No Kuni.
