= Akane Fujita (wrestler) =

Japanese professional wrestler

- Fujita in January 2020

Personal information
- Born: January 3, 1987 (age 39) Matsuyama, Japan

Professional wrestling career
- Ring name: Akane Fujita
- Billed height: 164 cm (5 ft 5 in)
- Billed weight: 63 kg (139 lb)
- Trained by: Hikaru Shida
- Debut: 2013

Akane Fujita (藤田あかね, Fujita Akane) is a Japanese professional wrestler currently working as a freelancer and is best known for her tenure with the Japanese promotions Ice Ribbon and Pro Wrestling Wave.

== Professional wrestling career ==
=== Ice Ribbon (2013-present) ===
Fujita spent most of her career competing in Ice Ribbon. She made her professional wrestling debut at New Ice Ribbon #469 on May 22, 2013, in an exhibition match in which she went in a time-limit draw against Kurumi. At New Ice Ribbon #960 on May 11, 2019, Fujita teamed up with Rina Yamashita to unsuccessfully challenge Azure Revolution (Maya Yukihi and Risa Sera) for the International Ribbon Tag Team Championship. At New Ice Ribbon #1013 RibbonMania on December 31, 2019, Fujita competed in Tequila Saya's retirement 45-person gauntlet match also involving notable opponents such as Cherry, Hamuko Hoshi, Kaori Yoneyama, Ken Ohka, Manami Toyota, Matsuya Uno, Syuri, Miyako Matsumoto and many others. At Ice Ribbon Risa Sera's 5th Produced Show on October 24, 2020, Fujita unsuccessfully challenged the title holder Risa Sera, Itsuki Aoki, Minoru Fujita, Takashi Sasaki, Takayuki Ueki, Toshiyuki Sakuda and Yuko Miyamoto in a hardcore match for the FantastICE Championship. At New Ice Ribbon #1142 on August 28, 2021, Fujita unsuccessfully challenged Tsukasa Fujimoto for the ICE Cross Infinity Championship.

Fujita took part in various cross-over events held by Ice Ribbon in partnership with various promotions. At Ice Ribbon Vs. Shinjuku 2-chome, an event produced alongside Wrestling of Darkness 666 on November 8, 2020, Fujita competed in two battle royal matches, one on the afternoon show where she faced the likes of Shinobu, Masashi Takeda, Maika Ozaki, Suzu Suzuki and others. On the evening show, in another battle royal where she met the same competitors. At Ice Ribbon & Actwres girl'Z Joint Show from November 16, 2020, she unsuccessfully challenged Miyuki Takase for the AgZ Championship.

=== Independent circuit (2013-present) ===
As a freelancer, Fujita is known to compete in various of the Japanese independent scene promotions. At JWP Joshi Puroresu's 2016 edition of the Tag League the Best tournament, she teamed up with Leon in a losing effort against Konami and Syuri in the first-round match. At Oz Academy Disorder on May 28, 2017, Fujita teamed up with Hamuko Hoshi in a losing effort against Aja Kong and Yoshiko. On the seventh night of Pro Wrestling Zero1's 2018 edition of the Fire Festival which took place on July 22, Fujita challenged Risa Sera, Yoshiko and Nanae Takahashi for the Blast Queen Championship. At SEAdLINNNG Yokohama Flash!, an event promoted by Seadlinnng on November 24, 2018, she teamed up with High Voltage stablemate Ryo Mizunami and Nanae Takahashi in a losing effort against Borderless (Rina Yamashita and Yoshiko). At BJW Pissari Festival, an event promoted by Big Japan Pro Wrestling on October 16, 2021, where she worked as a female talent, she fell short to Maya Yukihi. At GLEAT G PROWRESTLING Ver. 10, an event promoted by Gleat on November 26, 2021, she teamed up with Michiko Miyagi to defeat Thekla and Yappy.

=== Pro Wrestling Wave (2015-2020) ===
Fujita is also known for competing in Pro Wrestling Wave for which she made sporadic appearances. At WAVE Nagoya WAVE ~Kin Orca~ Vol. 11 on May 29, 2016, she competed in a two-count rule match in which she teamed up with Hiroe Nagahama and Asuka in a losing effort against Ayako Hamada, Yumi Ohka and Yuu Yamagata. At Catch the Wave 2017 ~ Scramble on May 3 she teamed up with Natsu Sumire to unsuccessfully challenge Yuki Miyazaki and Yumi Ohka for the Wave Tag Team Championship. She also competed in the Young Catch the Wave Block of 2016 where she went against Hiroe Nagahama, Sumire Natsu and Mari An scoring a total of two points.

=== World Wonder Ring Stardom (2022-present) ===
Fujita aligned herself with Suzu Suzuki, Risa Sera, Hiragi Kurumi and Mochi Miyagi in the Prominence stable at the end of 2021 after their contract with Ice Ribbon expired, leaving them to wander as freelance wrestlers. Fujita and the rest of the stable made their first appearance in World Wonder Ring Stardom's first pay-per-view of 2022, the Stardom Nagoya Supreme Fight from January 29 where they picked a fight with the Donna Del Mondo stable.

== Championships and accomplishments ==
- Ice Ribbon
  - FantastICE Championship (1 time)
  - Triangle Ribbon Championship (2 times)
  - Kizuna Tournament (2019) – with Asahi
- Professional Wrestling Just Tap Out
  - JTO Girls Tag Team Championship (1 time) – with Rhythm
- Other titles
  - WUW World Underground Wrestling Women's Championship (1 time)
