= Tequila Saya =

Japanese professional wrestler

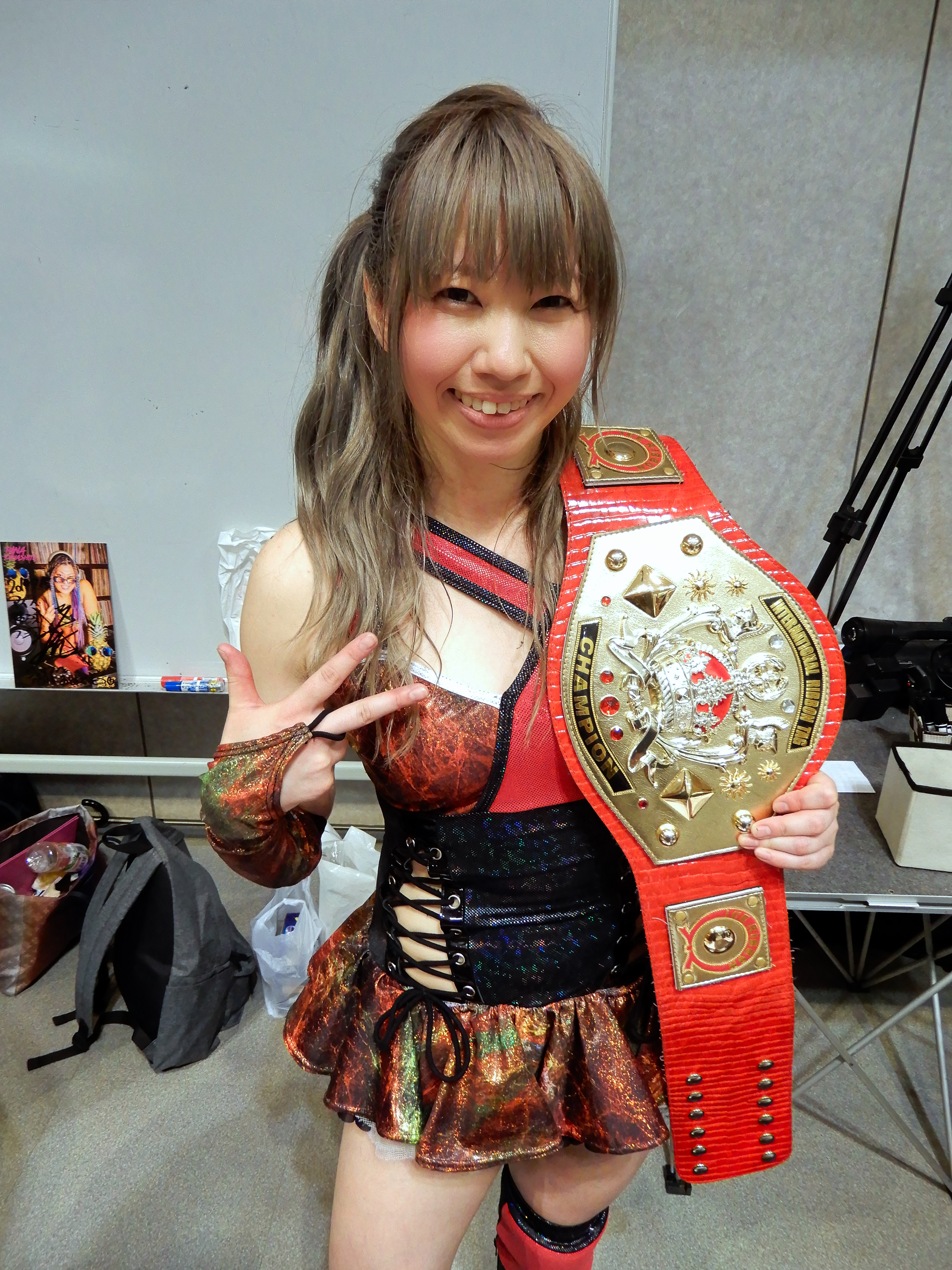
- Saya in July 2019

Personal information
- Born: January 19, 1984 (age 42) Hakodate, Hokkaido, Japan

Professional wrestling career
- Ring name(s): Tequila Saya; Saya
- Billed height: 157 cm (5 ft 2 in)
- Billed weight: 50 kg (110 lb)
- Trained by: Chiharu Ōno
- Debut: 2016
- Retired: 2019

Tequila Saya (テキーラさや, Tekira Saya) (born January 19, 1984) is a Japanese retired professional wrestler best known for her tenure with the Japanese promotions Ice Ribbon and Oz Academy.

== Professional wrestling career ==
=== Independent circuit (2016-2019) ===
As a freelancer, Saya was known for competing in various of the Japanese independent scene promotions. At WAVE Young OH! OH! The Final ~ Young All Stars Thanksgiving, an event promoted by pro Wrestling Wave on December 15, 2016, Saya participated in a nine-person battle royal also involving Asuka, Maika Ozaki, Konami, Mochi Miyagi and others. At SKIP Beat Kawaguchi Vol. 3, an event promoted by All Japan Pro Wrestling on May 7, 2017, Saya teamed up with Maruko Nagasaki in a losing effort against Azure Revolution (Maya Yukihi and Risa Sera). At Manami Toyota's retirement show, an event promoted by Oz Academy on November 3, 2017, Saya participated in a gauntlet match in which Toyota faced 50 people. She was the first one to defeat the latter. At ZERO1/Super Fireworks Hiroshima, an event produced by pro Wrestling Zero1 on November 18, 2018, she unsuccessfully challenged Risa Sera, Hide Kubota and Taru for the Blast Queen Championship. Saya also participated in freelance shows, such as Gake No Fuchi Joshi Pro Wrestling on December 24, 2019, where she teamed up with DDT Pro-Wrestling founder Sanshiro Takagi to pick up a victory over Miyako Matsumoto and Jiro Kuroshio in a intergender tag team match.

=== Ice Ribbon (2016-2019) ===
Saya worked most of her short-term career for Ice Ribbon. She made her professional wrestling debut at New Ice Ribbon #708, an event promoted on February 13, 2016, going into a time-limit draw against Yuuka as a result of an exhibition match. She is known for teaming up with Giulia as Burning Raw. At New Ice Ribbon #971 on July 15, 2019, they defeated Azure Revolution (Maya Yukihi and Risa Sera) to win the International Ribbon Tag Team Championship. At New Ice Ribbon #1013 RibbonMania on December 31, 2019, Saya had her last match in the promotion, a retirement 45-person gauntlet match also involving notable opponents such as Akane Fujita, Cherry, Hamuko Hoshi, Banny Oikawa, Kaori Yoneyama, Ken Ohka, Itsuki Aoki, Matsuya Uno, Syuri, Miyako Matsumoto, Yuki Mashiro, Kyuri and many others.

==== (2021) ====
Since her retirement, she has appeared in some matches held by the P's Party branch of Ice Ribbon. The most recent took place on November 17, 2021, where she competed in a 16-person gauntlet match won by Rina Yamashita and also involving Tsukushi Haruka, Totoro Satsuki, Chie Ozora and others.

=== Big Japan Pro Wrestling (2016-2019) ===
Saya worked as a female talent in several events promoted by Big Japan Pro Wrestling. At BJW Beer Garden Match on October 22, 2019, she teamed up with Suzu Suzuki in a losing effort against Ayumi Hayashi and Tsukasa Fujimoto.

== Championships and accomplishments ==
- Ice Ribbon
  - Triangle Ribbon Championship (1 time)
  - International Ribbon Tag Team Championship (1 time) – with Giulia
  - Ice Ribbon Year-End Award (2 times)
    - Rookie Award (2018) tied with Giulia
    - Special Award (2019)
