= Matsuya Uno =

Japanese professional wrestler

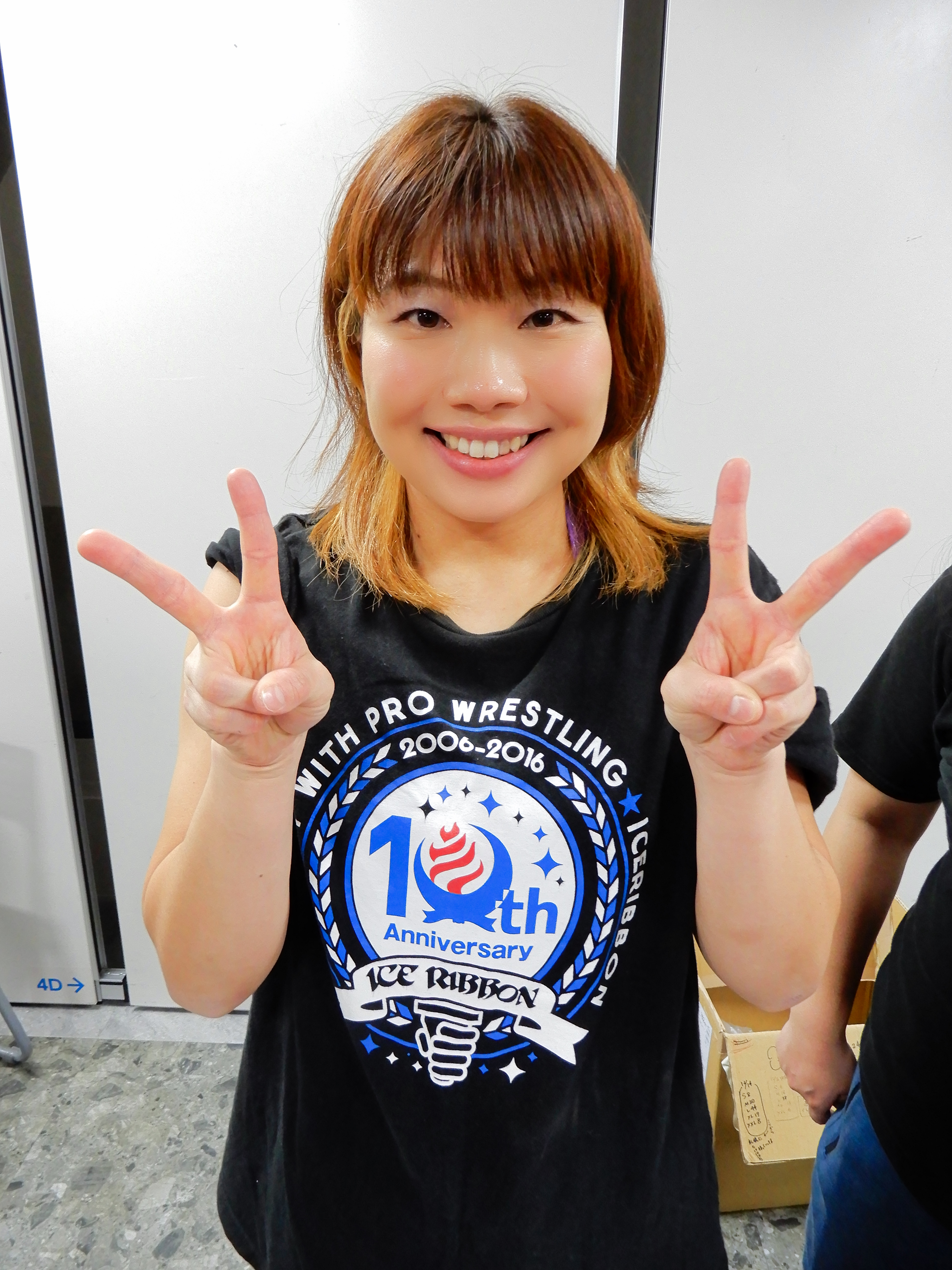
- Uno in December 2019

Personal information
- Born: January 18, 1984 (age 42) Niigata, Japan

Professional wrestling career
- Ring name(s): Matsuya Uno; Uno
- Billed height: 164 cm (5 ft 5 in)
- Billed weight: 57 kg (126 lb)
- Trained by: Chiharu Ōno; Cherry
- Debut: 2016
- Retired: June 27, 2021

Matsuya Uno (宇野松也, Uno Matsuya) is a retired Japanese professional wrestler, best known for her tenure in the Japanese promotions Ice Ribbon and Pro Wrestling Wave.

== Professional wrestling career ==
=== Independent circuit (2016–2021) ===
Uno is known for her brief work for various promotions. She competed for Pure-J at PURE-J/Leon Produce 20th Dojo Show on July 15, 2018 where she teamed up with Leon to defeat Mari Manji and Yako Fujigasaki. On February 3, 2019, she competed at SEAdLINNNG Go! Niigata!, an event promoted by Seadlinnng where she teamed up with Ryo Mizunami in a losing effort to Lovely Butchers (Hamuko Hoshi and Mochi Miyagi). On January 4, 2020, she took part in one of World Woman Pro-Wrestling Diana's house shows where she teamed up with Akane Fujita and Suzu Suzuki in a losing effort to CRYSIS (Jaguar Yokota and Megumi Yabushita) and Madeline in a six-woman tag team match. At ZERO1 Winter Niigata Convention ~ Dream Series Winter, an event promoted by Pro Wrestling Zero1 on February 2, 2020, she teamed up with Takuya Sugawara in a losing effort to Hiroe Nagahama and Takuya Sugi.

==== Ice Ribbon (2016–2021) ====
Uno debuted in Ice Ribbon, promotion for which she worked most of her career and started making sporadic appearances beginning with Ice Ribbon #735, an event promoted on July 3, 2016 where she teamed up with her trainer Cherry and 235, losing to Hamuko Hoshi, Mika Iida and Tequila Saya in a six-woman tag team match. At Ice Ribbon #806 ~ 235 Graduation on May 31, 2017, she participated in a 15-on-one gauntlet match also involving 235, Tsukushi, Hiragi Kurumi, Risa Sera and others. At Ice Ribbon #881 on May 3, 2018, Uno teamed up with Tequila Saya and unsuccessfully challenged Azure Revolution (Maya Yukihi and Risa Sera) for the International Ribbon Tag Team Championship.

Uno also made appearances in the Ice Ribbon P's Party show promoted by Ice Ribbon. On the show from May 22, 2019, she teamed up with Giulia to defeat Maya Yukihi and Tequila Saya. On September 14, 2019 at Yokohama Bunka Gymnasium III, Uno teamed with Jiro Kuroshio and defeated the team of Hideki Suzuki and Ram Kaicho, and the team of Jun Kasai and Miyako Matsumoto who was the champion in a three-way tag team match to win the Triangle Ribbon Championship. Kuroshio was not recognized as co-champion since only Uno competed for the title. Uno participated at Tequila Saya's retirement show at Ice Ribbon #1013 from December 31, 2019, where she took part in a 30-person gauntlet match which involved Tequila Saya and other popular wrestlers such as Syuri, Manami Toyota, Ken Ohka, Munenori Sawa, Yuki Mashiro, Nao Ishikawa and others.

Uno unsuccessfully challenged Risa Sera for the FantastICE Championship on October 18, 2020 at Ice Ribbon New Ice Ribbon #1076 In 176BOX in an only give up match. At AWG Ice Ribbon & Actwres girl'Z Joint Show on November 11, 2020, Uno teamed up with Satsuki Totoro, Tsukushi Haruka, Hiragi Kurumi and Ibuki Hoshi to defeat Team AWG (Ami Miura, Hikari Shimizu, Kakeru Sekiguchi, Mari and Saki) in a ten-women tag team match.

Uno retired from professional wrestling on June 27, 2021, at Ice Ribbon #1129 ~ Goodbye Our Matsuya Uno, event where she teamed up with Totoro Satsuki and Cherry to defeat Hamuko Hoshi, Maya Yukihi and Tsukasa Fujimoto.

==== Pro Wrestling Wave (2016–2021) ====
At WAVE Niigata WAVE ~ TOKI 2 on February 2, 2020, Uno unsuccessfully competed against Yumi Ohka. She participated in a non-tournament match at the 2021 edition of the Catch The Wave event on May 28, 2021 where she teamed up with Mio Momono in a losing effort to Yuu and Rin Kadokura.

== Championships and accomplishments ==
- Ice Ribbon

- Triangle Ribbon Championship (2 times)
