= Maya Yukihi =

Japanese professional wrestler

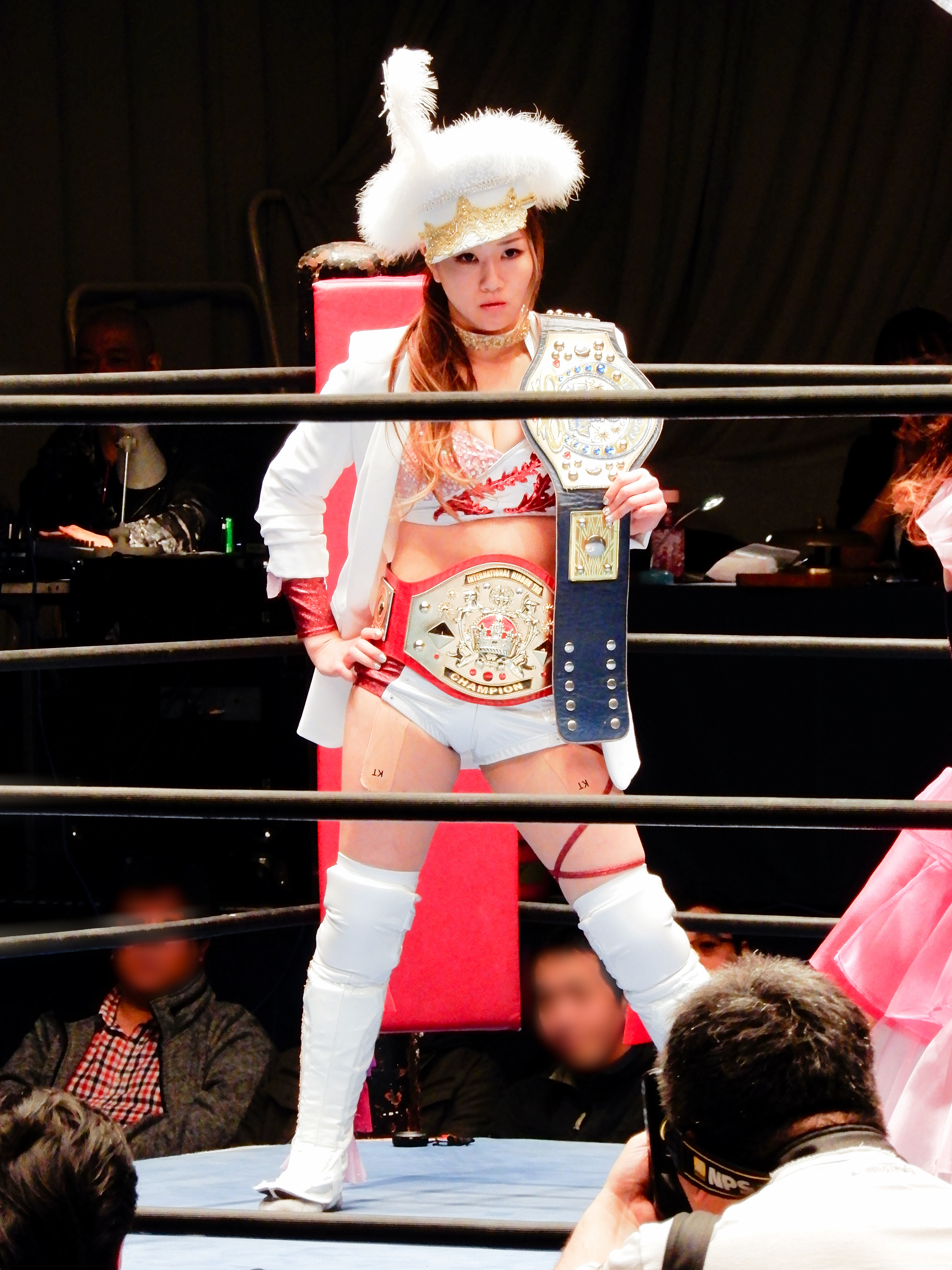
- Yukihi in 2019

Personal information
- Born: January 9 Chiba, Japan
- Education: Ferris University

Professional wrestling career
- Ring name(s): Maya Mamushi; Maya Yukihi
- Billed height: 1.64 m (5 ft 5 in)
- Billed weight: 57 kg (126 lb)
- Trained by: 235; Maki Narumiya; Mayumi Ozaki
- Debut: November 24, 2014

Maya Yukihi (雪妃 真矢, Yukihi Maya; born January 9) is a Japanese professional wrestler, currently competing as a freelancer. She is a former two-time ICE×60 Championship, five-time International Ribbon Tag Team Champion and one-time Triangle Ribbon Champion, making her the promotion's fourth Triple Crown Champion.

Yukihi also wrestles for Oz Academy, where she is a two-time Oz Academy Openweight Champion and a former two-time Oz Academy Tag Team Champion.

== Early and personal life ==
Yukihi attended and graduated from Ferris University, majoring in the English Department. Afterwards, she worked as an office associate at a bank before turning to professional wrestling. Yukihi is multilingual, speaking fluent Japanese, English, Korean, and Spanish.

== Professional wrestling career ==
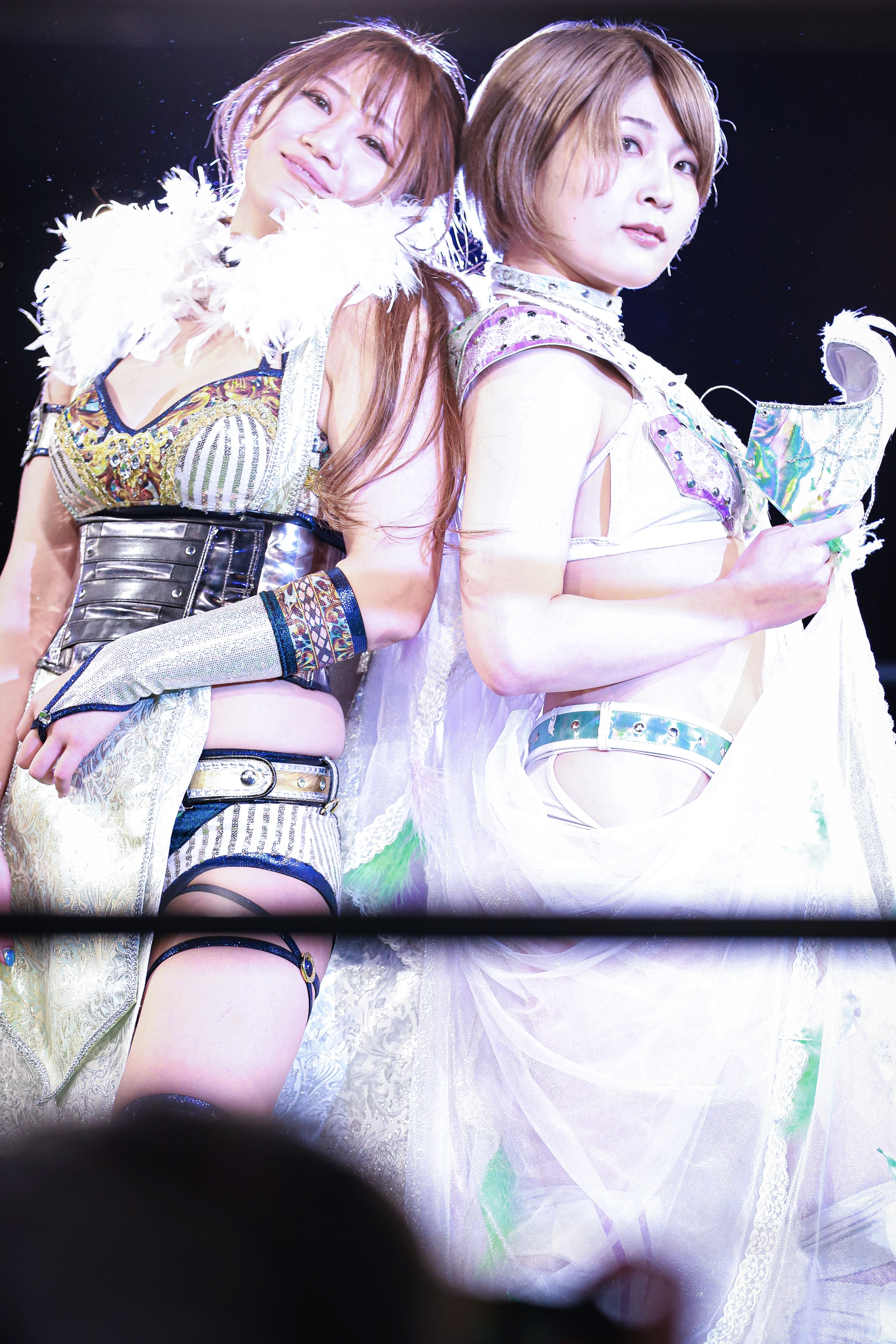
Yukihi (left) and Saori Anou in April 2023

=== Ice Ribbon (2014–2021) ===
Yukihi was first introduced to Ice Ribbon on July 12, 2014, as a trainee named "Yuki", however, Yukihi made her official debut on November 24 under the name Maya Yukihi at Yokohama Ribbon V, where she teamed with Tsukushi, as both unsuccessfully challenged the team of Mochi Miyagi and Tomoka Nakagawa. On November 14, 2015, Yukihi aligned herself with Risa Sera, naming their team "Azure Revolution".

On July 18, 2016, Yukihi received her first title match when she challenged Tsukasa Fujimoto for the ICE×60 Championship, but was unsuccessful. Yukihi participated in the ICE×60 Championship Tournament and managed to get to the second round on November 23, where she was eliminated by Hiragi Kurumi.

Through 2017, Azure Revolution began to pursue after the International Ribbon Tag Team Championship. They received their first title match against Kurumi and Tsukushi on April 24, but were unsuccessful. when the International Ribbon Tag Team Championship was vacated on September 9, Azure Revolution entered an eight-team tournament to win the vacant championship on October 29, when they defeated the Lovely Butchers (Hamuko Hoshi and Miyagi) in the finals.

Azure Revolution held the title until July 1, 2018, where they were defeated by Lovely Butchers, ending their reign at 245 days with 7 successful title defenses. On December 9, Yukihi won a tournament to determine the No. 1 contender for the ICE×60 Championship by defeating Maika Ozaki in the finals. On December 31, at Ice Ribbon's biggest event RibbonMania, Yukihi defeated Fujimoto to win the ICE×60 Championship for the first time.

On March 17, 2019, Azure Revolution defeated Gekokujo Tag (Kyuyri and Ozaki) to win the International Ribbon Tag Team Championship for the second time. On May 1, Yukihi defeated Banny Oikawa to win the Triangle Ribbon Championship in a three-way match, as all the matches for this title contested under this stipulation, which also involved Fujimoto. By winning the Triangle Ribbon Championship, Yukihi became the fourth Triple Crown Champion of Ice Ribbon. On June 22, Yukihi lost the Triangle Ribbon Championship to Fujimoto in a match that also involved Tequila Saya, and on July 15, Azure Revolution lost the International Ribbon Tag Team Championship to Giulia and Saya. On August 3, Yukihi defended the ICE×60 Championship against Fujimoto which ended in a 30-minute time limit draw, therefore, the championship was automatically vacated as the rules states when the match ended in 30-minute time limit draw, the champion stripped from the title. Yukihi entered a tournament for the vacant ICE×60 Championship where she defeated her tag team partner Sera on September 14 to regain the title. On November 23, Azure Revolution lost the International Ribbon Tag Team Championship to the Dropkickers (Fujimoto and Tsukushi).

On February 24, 2020, after Yukihi successfully defended the ICE×60 Championship against Akane Fujita, Yukihi introduced her own unit named "Rebel X Enemy", alongside Ozaki, Ram Kaicho and Rina Yamashita. On August 9, Yukihi lost the ICE×60 Championship to Suzu Suzuki at the final show in the Yokohama Cultural Gymnasium before its closure, ending her second reign at 330 days with six successful title defenses. On December 31, at RibbonMania, Yukihi alongside Ozaki defeated Frank Sisters (Hiragi Kurumi and Miyagi) to win the International Ribbon Tag Team Championship.

== Championships and accomplishments ==
- All Japan Pro Wrestling
  - AJPW TV Six-Man Tag Team Championship (1 time) – with Suwama and Mayumi Ozaki
- DDT Pro-Wrestling
  - Ironman Heavymetalweight Championship (1 time)
- Ice Ribbon
  - ICE×60 Championship (2 times)
  - ICE×60 Championship No. 1 Contender Tournament (2018)
  - ICE×60 Championship Tournament (2019)
  - International Ribbon Tag Team Championship (5 times) – with Maika Ozaki (1) and Risa Sera (4)
  - Ice Ribbon Tag Team Championship Tournament (2017) – with Risa Sera
  - Triangle Ribbon Championship (1 time)
  - Fourth Triple Crown Champion
  - Ice Ribbon Year-End Award (7 times)
    - Best Bout Award (2019) vs. Risa Sera on September 14
    - Best Bout Award (2020) vs. Suzu Suzuki on August 9
    - Best Dressed Award (2016)
    - Best Tag Team Award (2017) with Risa Sera
    - Happy Camera Award (2016)
    - MVP Award (2019)
    - Rookie Award (2016)
- Oz Academy
  - Oz Academy Openweight Championship (2 times)
  - Oz Academy Tag Team Championship (2 times) – with Mayumi Ozaki (1) and Saori Anou (1)
  - Best Wizard Award (4 times)
    - Best Bout Award (2017) with Mayumi Ozaki vs. Akino and Kaho Kobayashi on October 29
    - Best Bout Award (2021) vs. Mayumi Ozaki, Saori Anou and Yumi Ohka on August 18
    - Best Bout Award (2024) vs. Mayumi Ozaki on August 18
    - MVP Award (2021)
- Pro Wrestling Illustrated
  - Ranked No. 82 of the top 100 female wrestlers in the PWI Female 100 in 2019
  - Ranked No. 105 of the top 150 female wrestlers in the PWI Women's 150 in 2021
