= List of World Wonder Ring Stardom personnel =

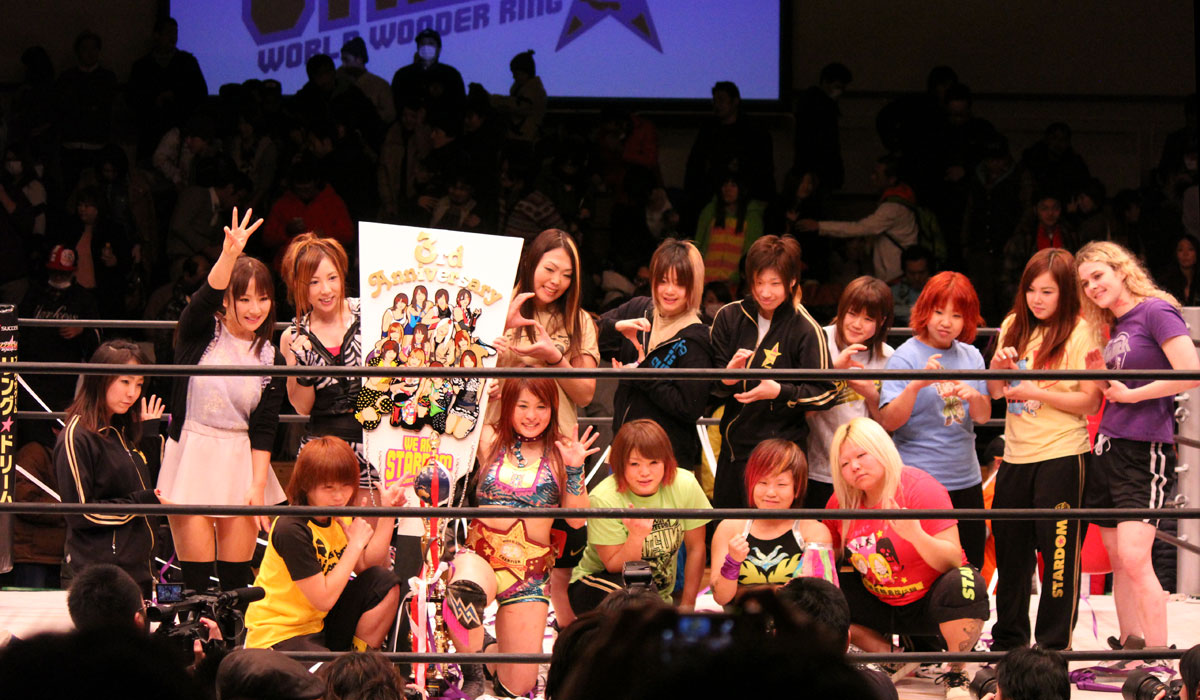
Various roster members at the third anniversary of the company in 2014.

World Wonder Ring Stardom is a Japanese professional wrestling promotion founded in 2010. Stardom personnel consists of professional wrestlers, referees, commentators, ring announcers, and various other positions. Executive officers are also listed. Stardom also frequently features wrestlers from various promotions from the Japanese independent scene in events such as the rookie-based "New Blood".

== Wrestlers ==
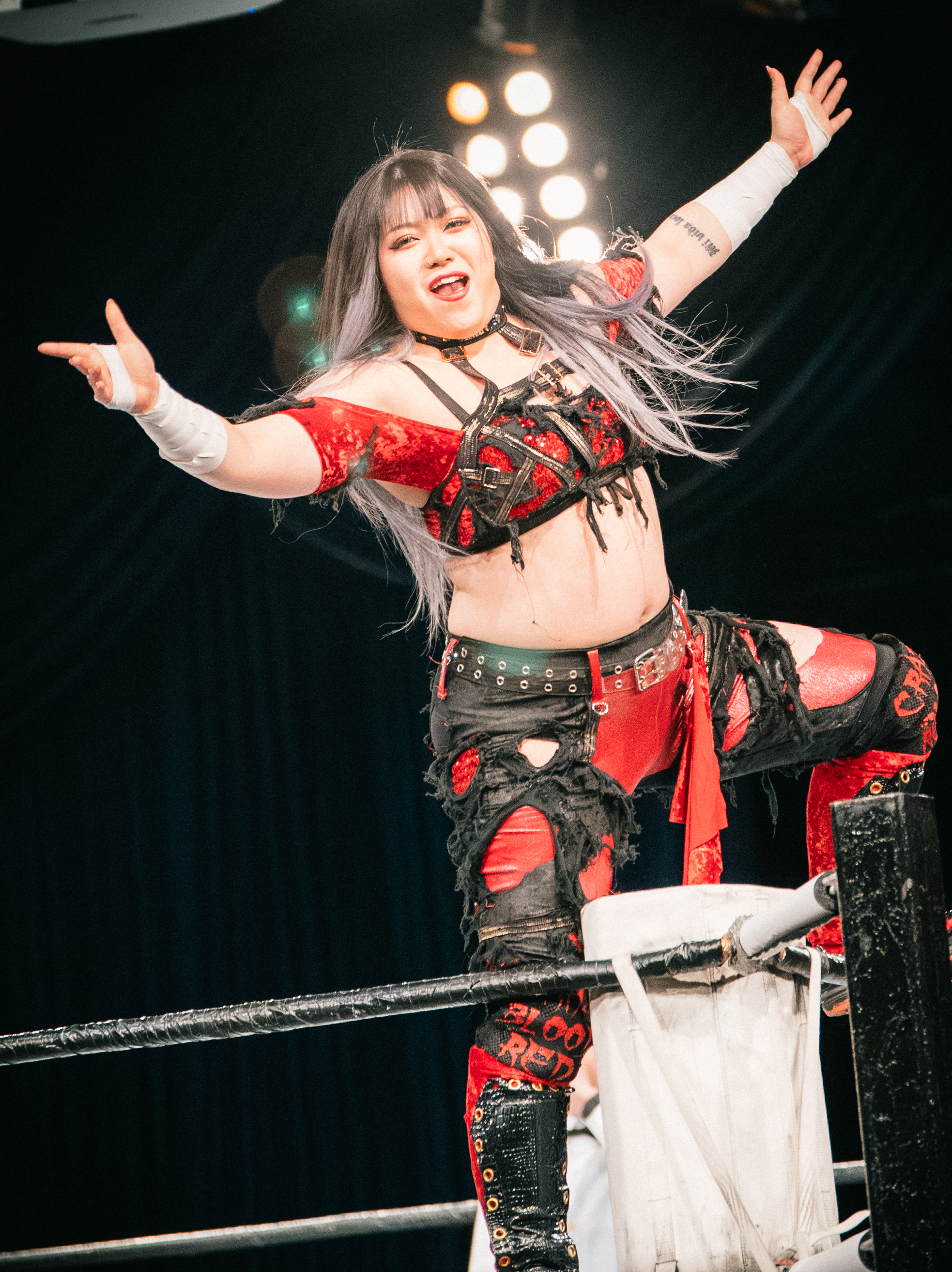
Suzu Suzuki

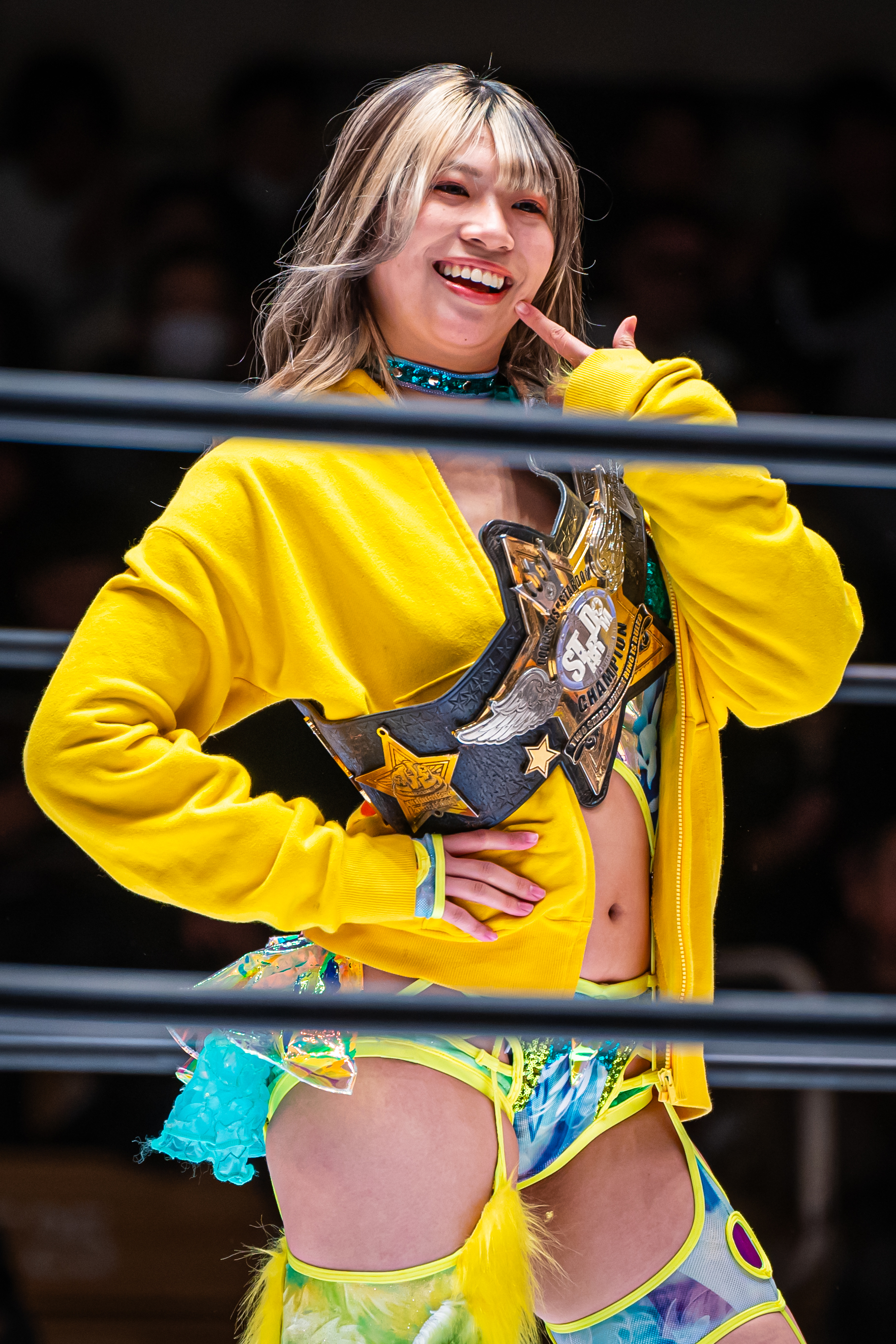
Hanan

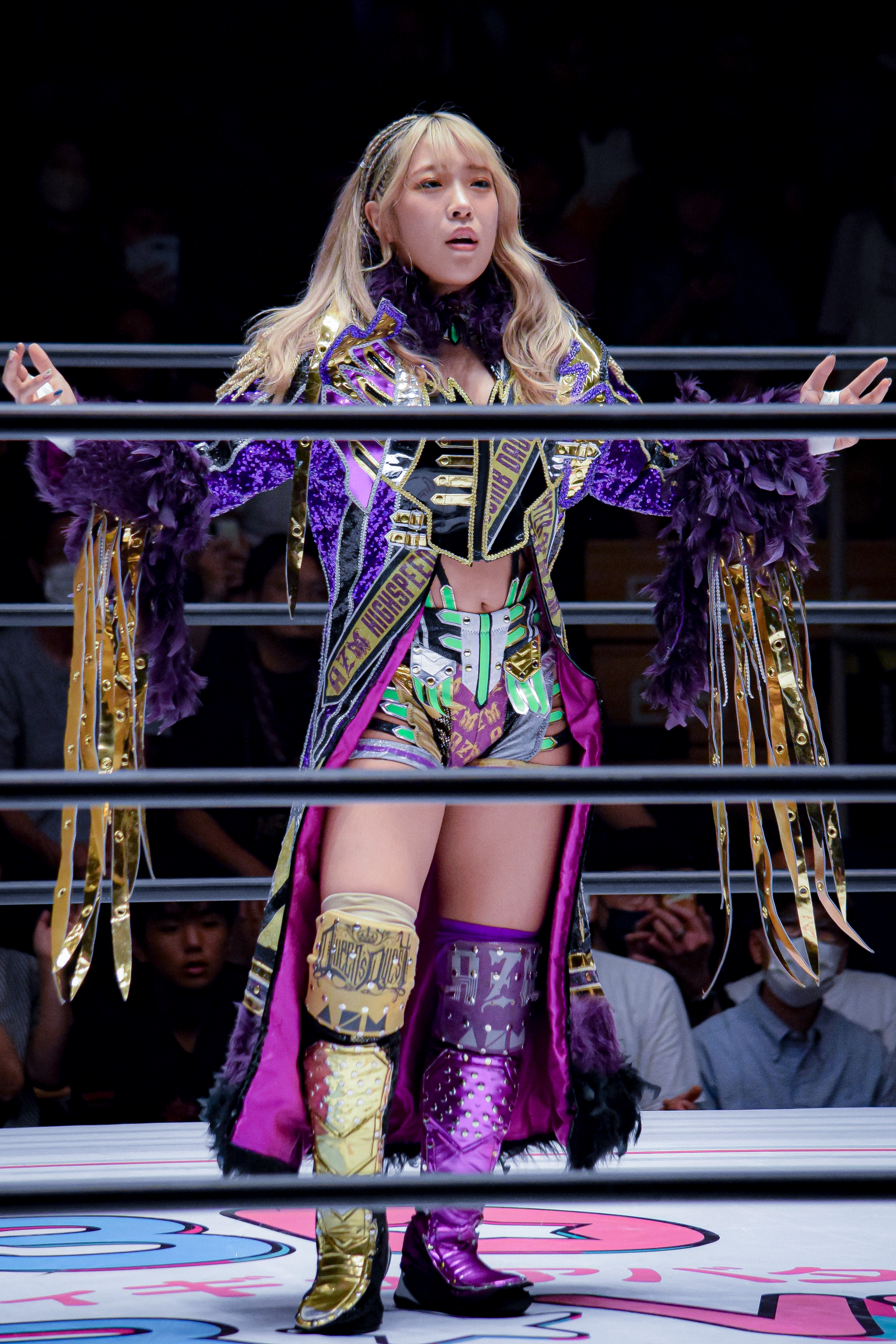
AZM

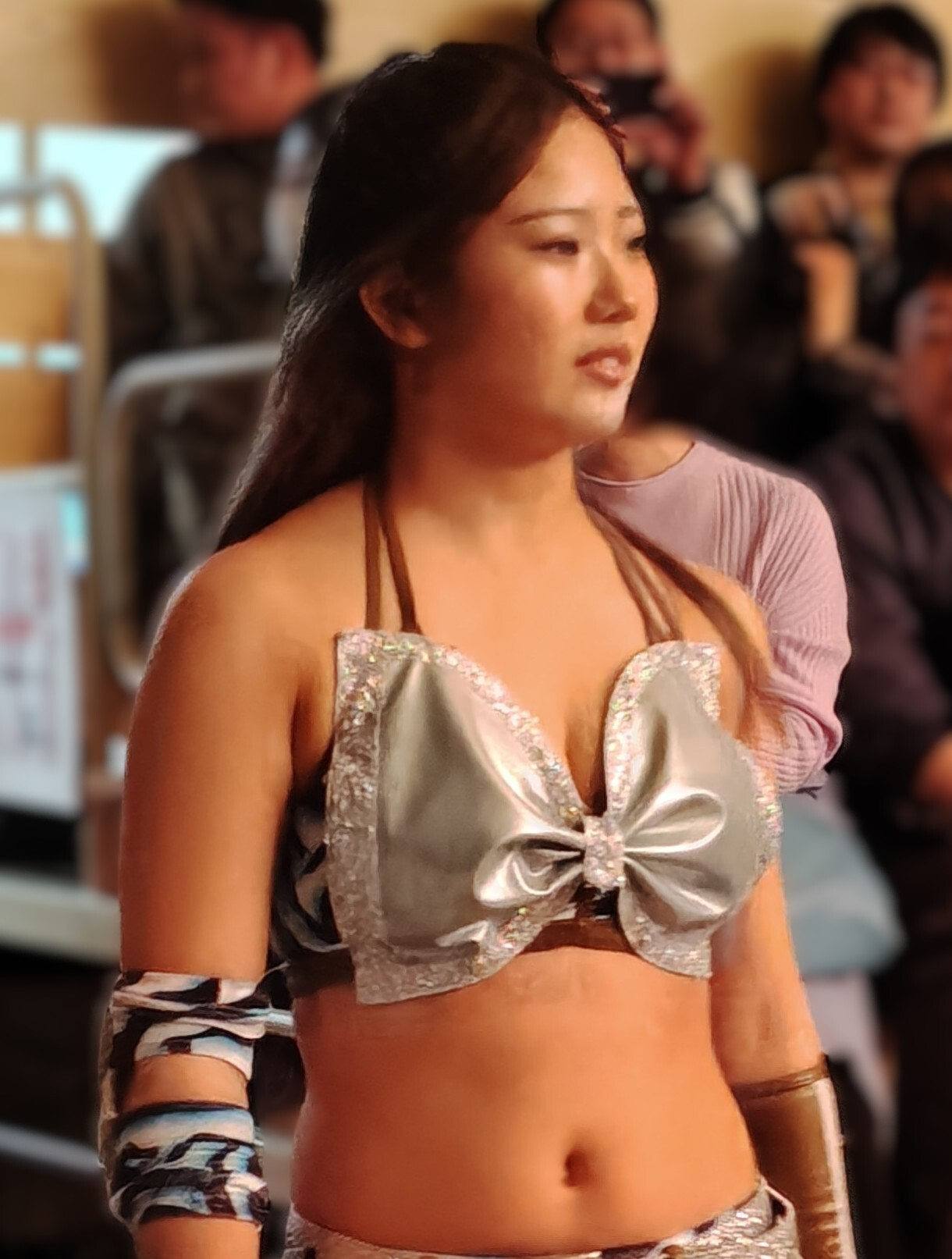
Miyu Amasaki

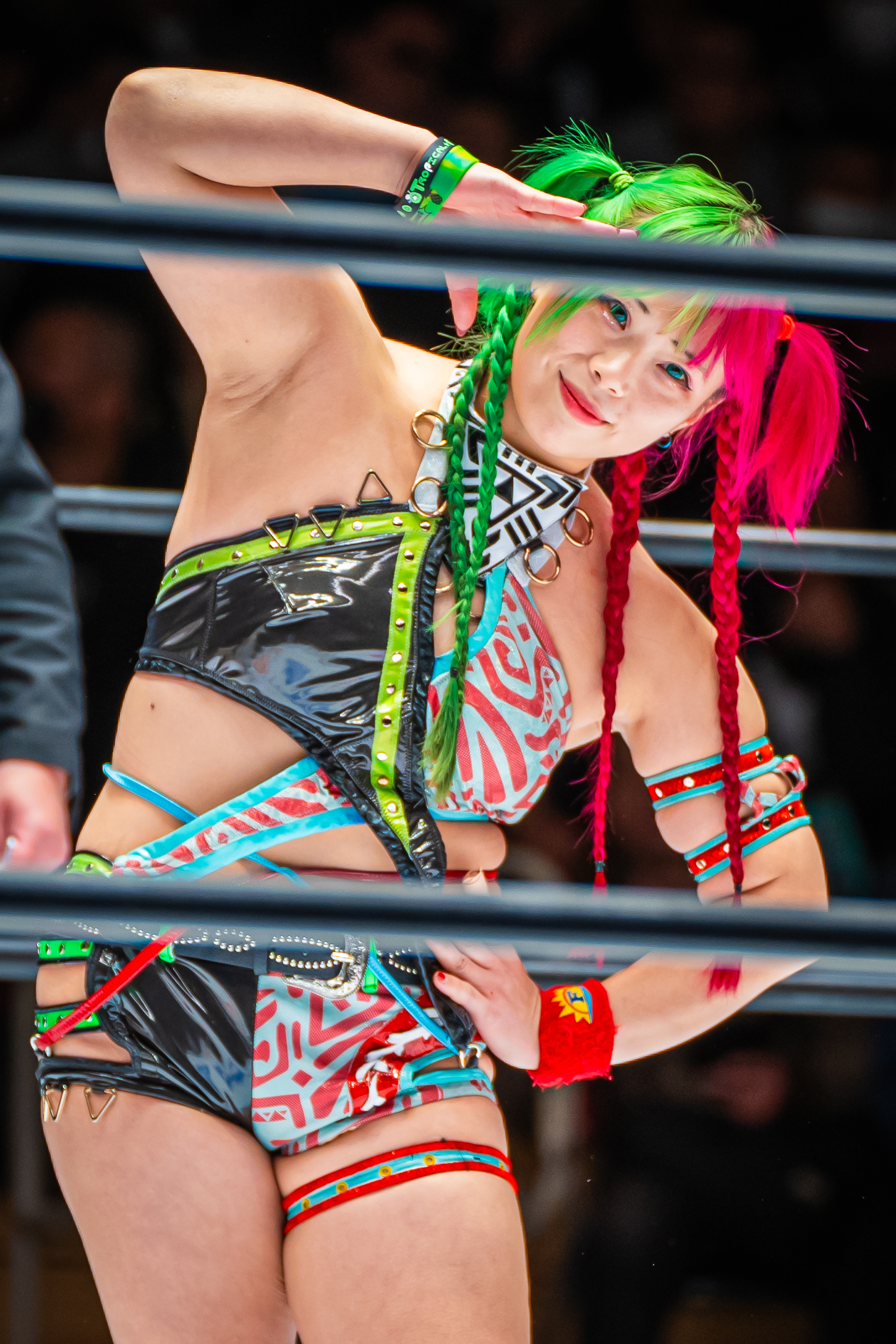
Yuna Mizumori

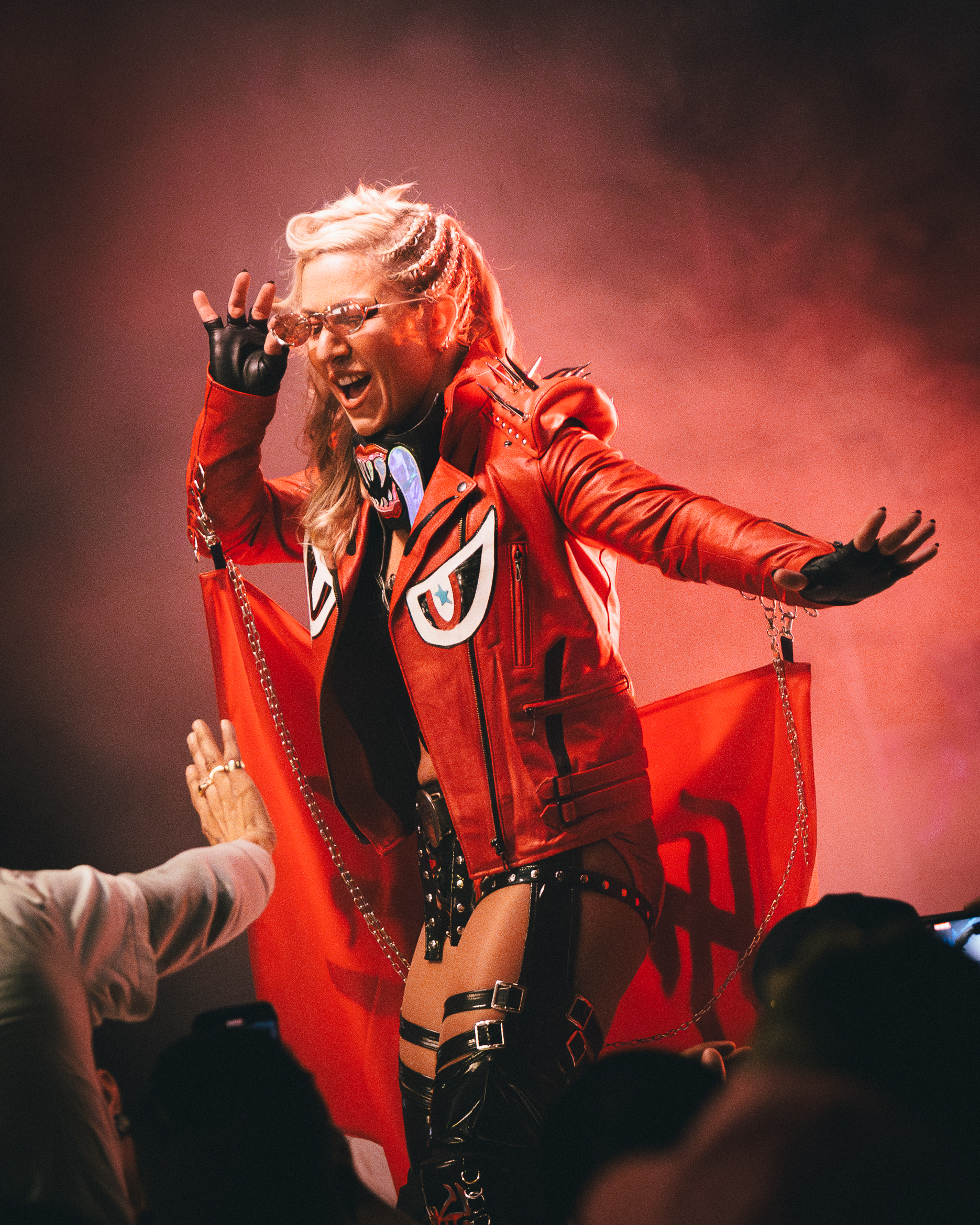
Thekla

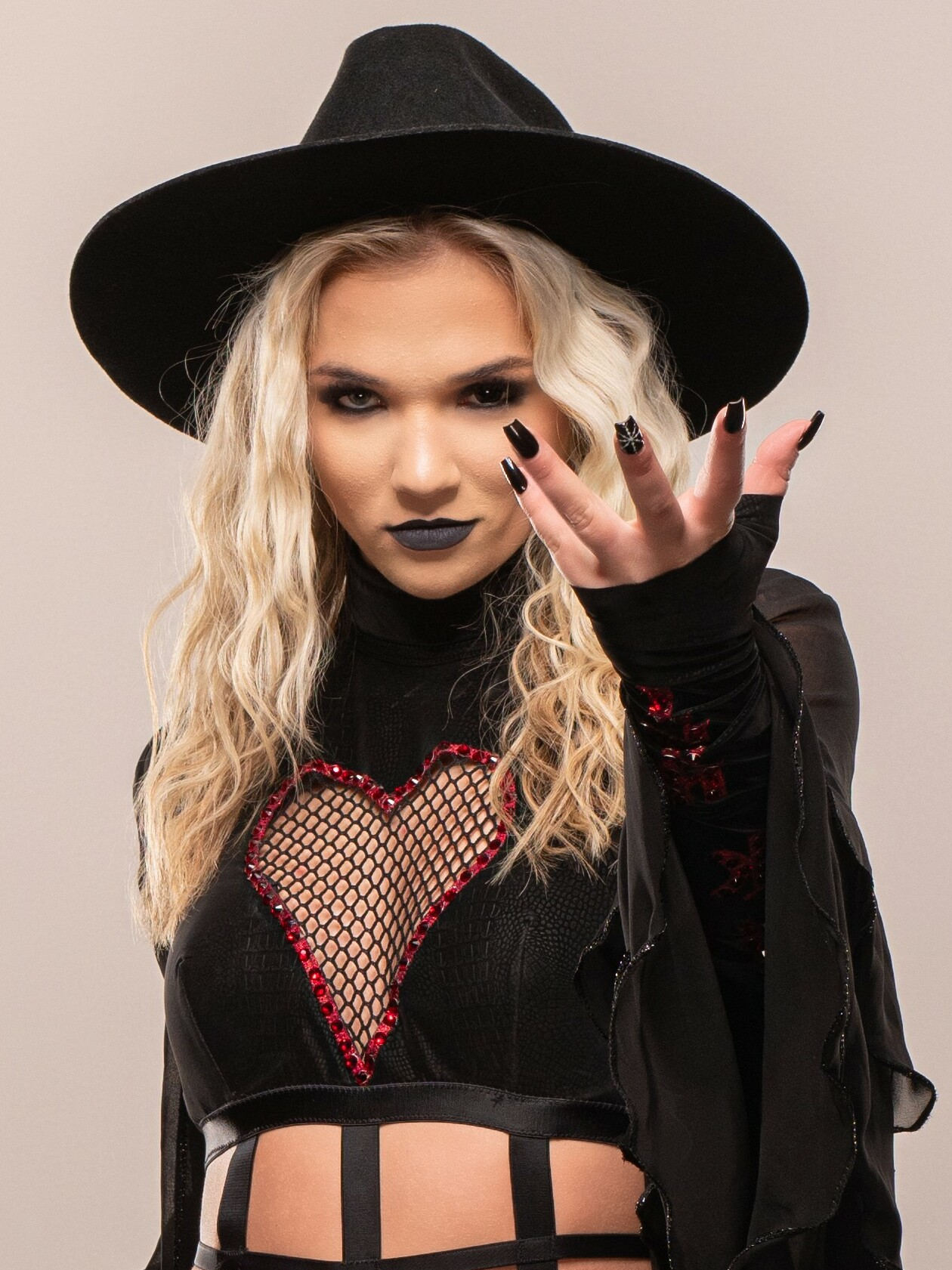
Julia Hart

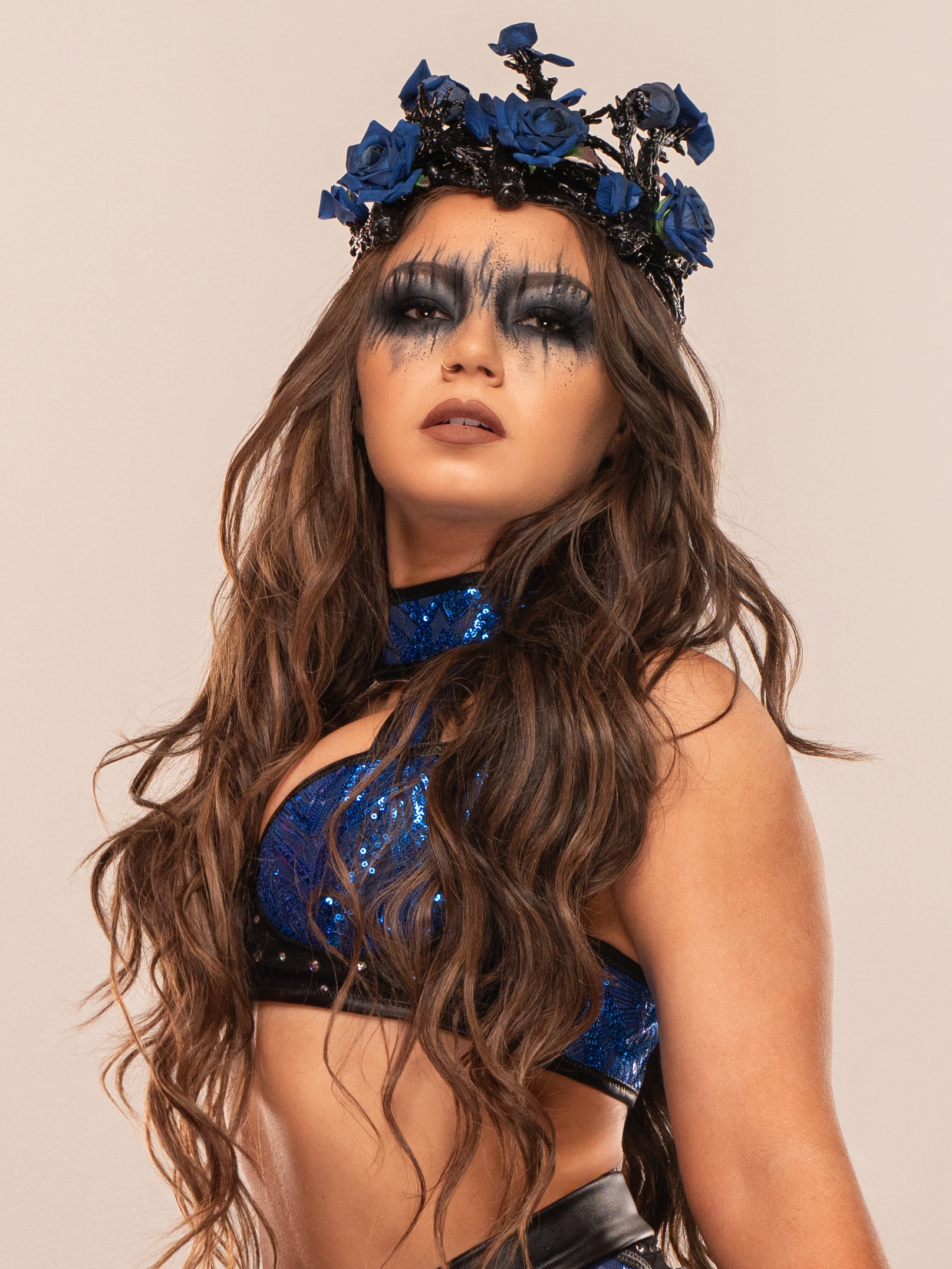
Skye Blue

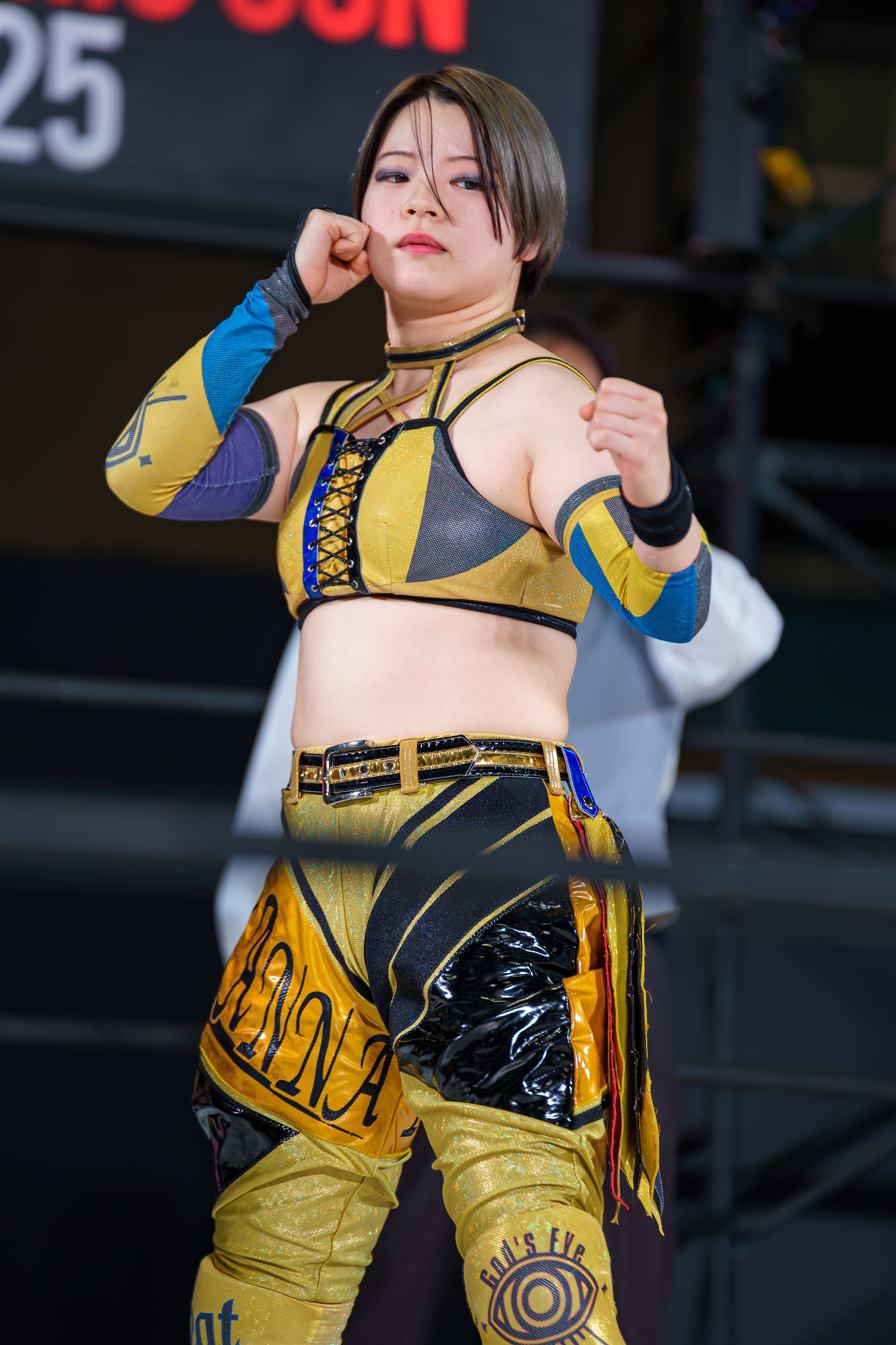
Ranna Yagami

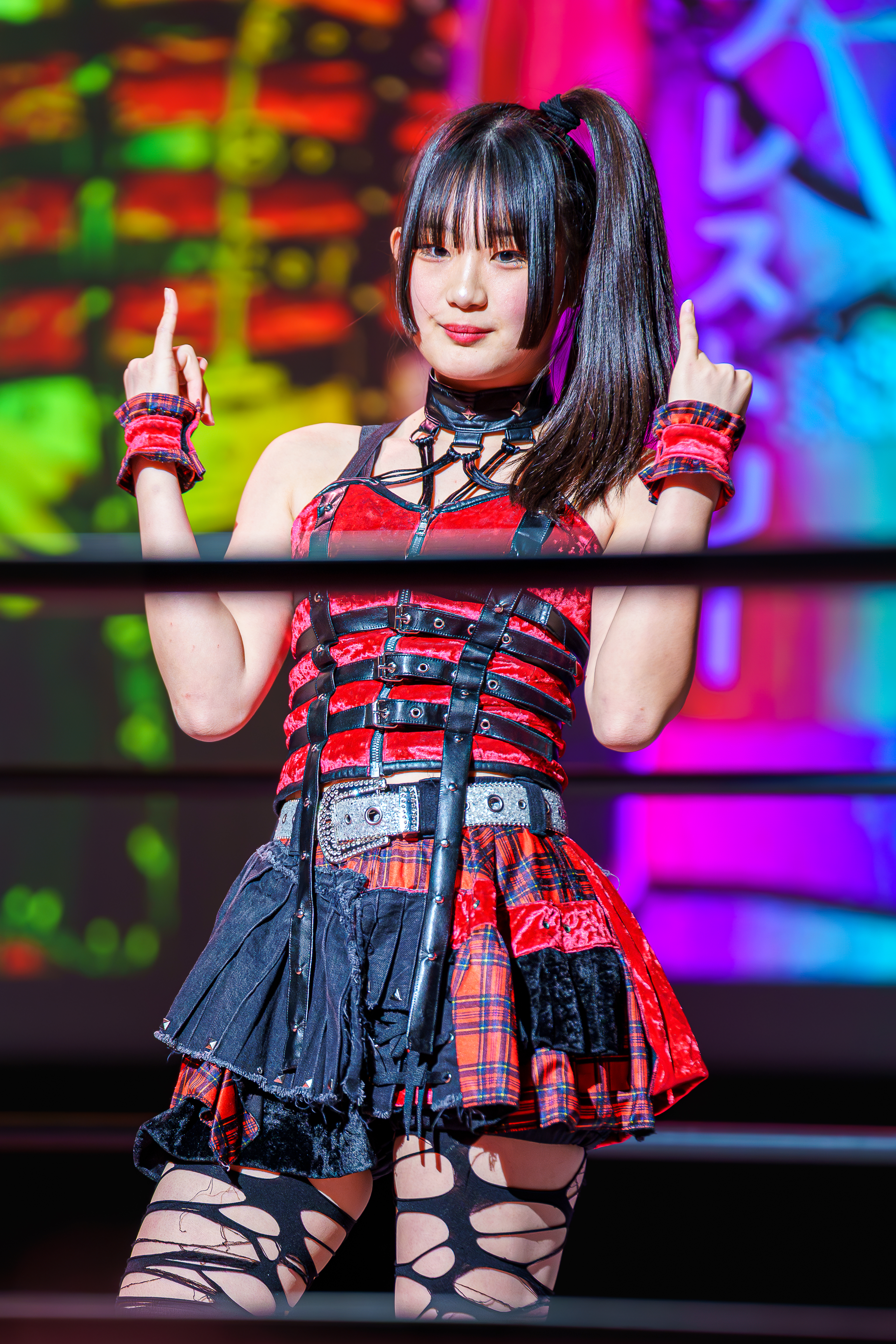
Kikyo Furusawa

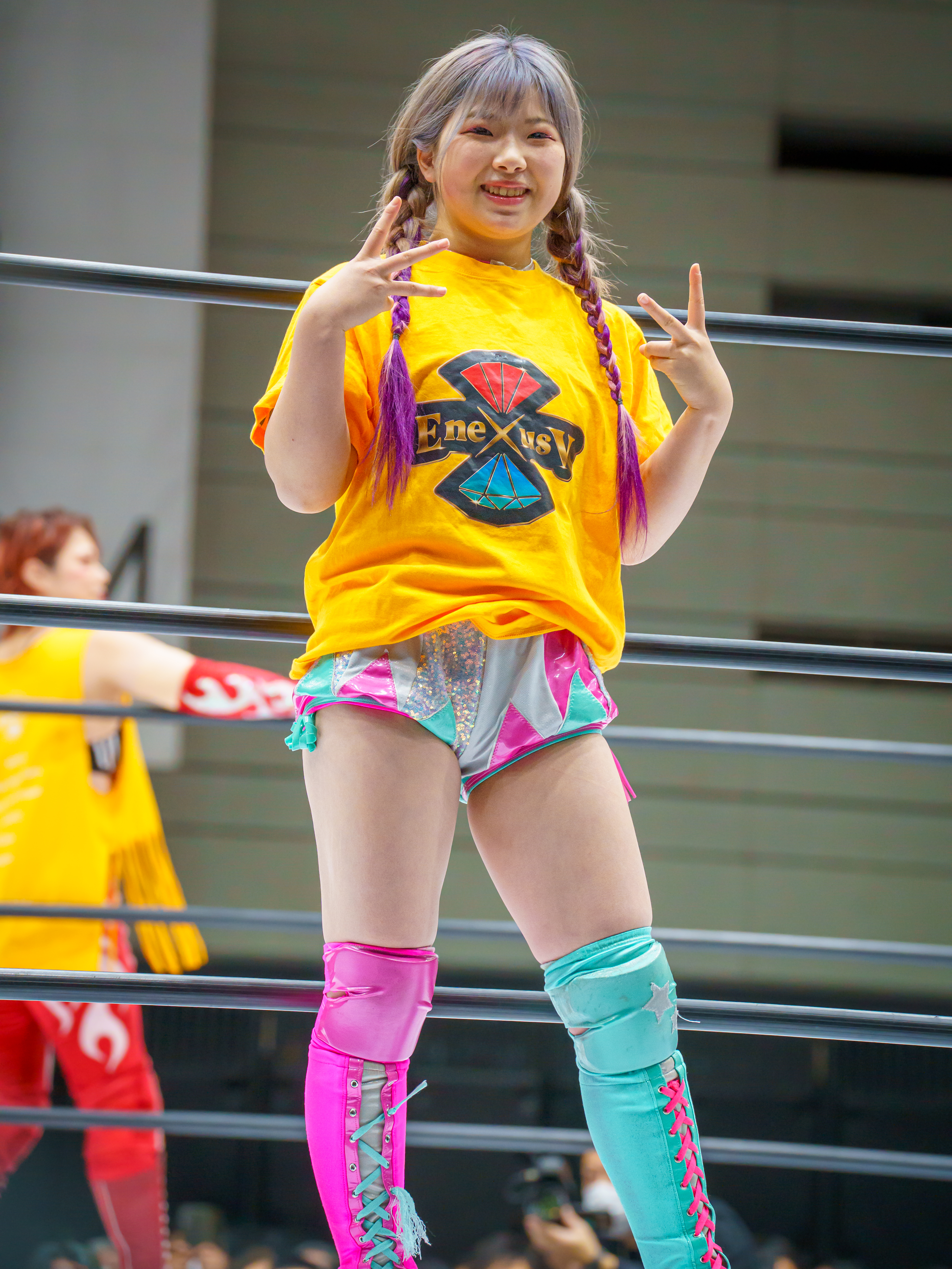
Rian

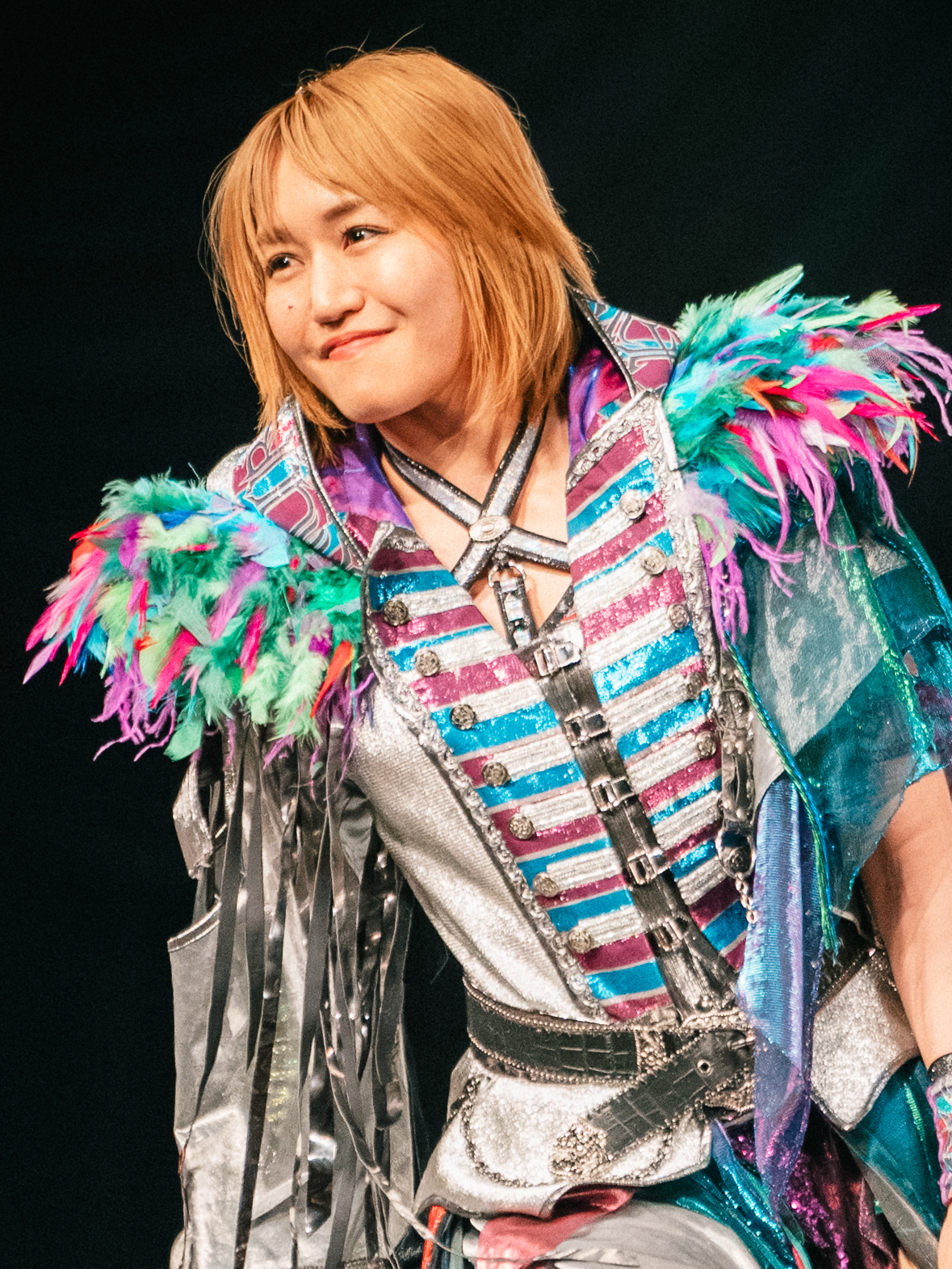
Syuri

| Ring name | Real name | Unit | Notes |
|---|---|---|---|
| Akira Kurogane | Unknown | Mi Vida Loca | |
| Ami Sohrei | Ami Miura | God's Eye | |
| Anne Kanaya | Anne Kanaya | Cosmic Angels | |
| Aya Sakura | Sakura Ishiguro | Cosmic Angels (L) | |
| AZM | Azumi Matsumoto | Neo Genesis | Goddesses of Stardom Champion |
| Azusa Inaba | Azusa Inaba | H.A.T.E. | Signed to JTO |
| Bea Priestley | Beatrice Terry | H.A.T.E. | |
| Bozilla | Unknown | Mi Vida Loca | Inactive; knee injury |
| Ema Maishima | Mai Matsuda | Neo Genesis | |
| Fukigen Death★ | Kaori Yoneyama | H.A.T.E. | Freelancer |
| Fuwa-chan | Haruka Fuwa | Unaffiliated | |
| Hanako | Hanako Ueda | Stars | |
| Hanan | Unknown | Stars (L) | Wonder of Stardom Champion |
| Hazuki | Reo Hazuki | Unaffiliated | |
| Hina | Unknown | God's Eye | |
| Julia Hart | Julia Hart | Triangle of Madness | Signed to All Elite Wrestling; Artist of Stardom Champion |
| Itsuki Aoki | Aika Aoki | Mi Vida Loca | Freelancer |
| Kikyo Furusawa | An Toyoshima | Unaffiliated | New Blood Tag Team Champion |
| Kiyoka Kotatsu | Maya Fukuda | God's Eye | |
| Koguma | Unknown | Unaffiliated | |
| Konami | Konami Takemoto | H.A.T.E. | |
| Lady C | Chie Nagatani | God's Eye | |
| Maika | Unknown | Stars | |
| Maki Itoh | Maki Itō | Unaffiliated | |
| Matoi Hamabe | Matoi Hamabe | Stars | |
| Mei Seira | Mei Hoshizuki | Neo Genesis | |
| Miyu Amasaki | Miyu Matsuda | Neo Genesis | Goddesses of Stardom Champion |
| Momo Kohgo | Unknown | Stars | Inactive; undisclosed injury |
| Momo Watanabe | Momo Watanabe | H.A.T.E. | |
| Natsuko Tora | Unknown | H.A.T.E. (L) | |
| Natsupoi | Natsumi Takagi | Cosmic Angels | |
| Ranna Yagami | Unknown | God's Eye | Future of Stardom Champion |
| Rian | Rian Kaneda | Unaffiliated | New Blood Tag Team Champion |
| Rina | Unknown | H.A.T.E. | |
| Rina Yamashita | Rina Yamashita | Mi Vida Loca | Freelancer |
| Ruaka | Unknown | H.A.T.E. | |
| Saori Anou | Saori Anou | Cosmic Angels | |
| Saya Iida | Saya Iida | Stars | |
| Saya Kamitani | Saya Kamitani | H.A.T.E. | |
| Sayaka Kurara | Unknown | Cosmic Angels (L) | |
| Skye Blue | Skylar Dolecki | Triangle of Madness | Signed to All Elite Wrestling; Artist of Stardom Champion |
| Starlight Kid | Unknown | Neo Genesis (L) | |
| Suzu Suzuki | Suzu Suzuki | Mi Vida Loca (L) | World of Stardom Champion |
| Syuri | Syuri Kondo | God's Eye (L) | IWGP Women's Champion |
| Thekla | Thekla Kaischauri | Triangle of Madness | Signed to All Elite Wrestling; Artist of Stardom Champion |
| Tomoka Inaba | Tomoka Inaba | God's Eye | Signed to JTO |
| Utami Hayashishita | Utami Hayashishita | Stars | |
| Waka Tsukiyama | Waka Tsukiyama | Stars | |
| Yuna Mizumori | Yuna Mizumori | Cosmic Angels | High Speed Champion |
| Yuria Hime | Yuriko Yomota | Stars | |

== Referees ==
| Ring name | Real name | Notes |
|---|---|---|
| Barb Sasaki | Sena Sasaki | |
| Daichi Murayama | Daichi Murayama | |
| Duke Sado | Duke Sado | |

== Other personnel ==
| Ring name | Real name | Notes |
|---|---|---|
| Jimbo Bonji | Unknown | English-language Commentator |
| Rin Tateishi | Rin Tateishi | Ring Announcer |
| Takaaki Kidani | Takaaki Kidani | Chairman and Representative Director of Bushiroad |
| Taro Okada | Taro Okada | President and Representative Director |
| Walker Stewart | Walker Stewart | English-language Commentator; Director of Global PR & Communications |
| Yoritaka Ando | Yoritaka Ando | Ring Announcer |
| Yuki Nemoto | Yuki Nemoto | President and Representative Director of Bushiroad |
| Yurie Kozakai | Yurie Kozakai | Ring Announcer; Time Keeper |
| Yuzuki Watase | Yuzuki Watase | Ring Announcer |

== Alumni ==
| Ring name | Real name | Notes |
|---|---|---|
| Act Yasukawa | Yuka Yasukawa | Retired on December 23, 2015. Served as Oedo Tai's manager until 2016. |
| Andras Miyagi | Michiko Miyagi | Resigned in January 2020. |
| Arisa Hoshiki | Arisa Hoshiki | Retired from professional wrestling on May 20, 2020, due to head and neck injuries. |
| Nanase | Unknown | Went inactive following April 16, 2017. |
| Eri Susa | Eriko Susa | Resigned on December 1, 2013. |
| Fuka | Fuka Kakimoto | Founder, former General Manager and ring announcer. Retired on March 28, 2018. |
| Giulia | Eimi Gloria Matsudo | Left on March 31, 2024, to sign with WWE. |
| Haruka | Haruka Kumagai | Went inactive following August 14, 2011. |
| Himeka | Hana Arita | Wrestled her final match on April 23, 2023 and officially retired on May 14, 2023. |
| Hiromi Mimura | Hiromi Mimura | Retired on March 28, 2018. |
| Io Shirai | Masami Odate | Left on June 17, 2018, to sign with WWE. |
| Iris | Unknown | Returned to native Mexico in April 2011. |
| Itsuki Hoshino | Unknown | Retired on July 26, 2020, due to physical ailments. |
| Jungle Kyona | Kyōna Yano | Left on September 30, 2021. |
| Kagetsu | Yu Ishino | Left on February 15, 2020 |
| Kairi Hojo | Kaori Housako | Left on June 4, 2017, Returned to work for WWE in 2023. Later made appearances as a freelancer. |
| Kris Wolf | Kris Hernandez | Left on March 25, 2018. |
| Leo Onozaki | Unknown | Retired on February 16, 2020. |
| Maaya | Unknown | Went inactive in 2014. |
| Mami Houjyou | Mami Houjyou | Trainee, quit before the promotion's inaugural event. |
| Mai Sakurai | Unknown | Left on March 31, 2024 |
| Mayu Iwatani | Mayu Iwatani | Left on April 28, 2025. |
| Miho Wakizawa | Miho Wakizawa | Retired on December 23, 2014. |
| Mina Shirakawa | Mina Shirakawa | Left on March 26, 2025, to sign with AEW. |
| Mirai | Mirai Ito | Left on March 31, 2024 |
| Mika Nagano | Mika Nagano | Retired on February 6, 2014. |
| Natsuki☆Taiyo | Natsumi Mizushima | Retired on June 1, 2014. |
| Natsumi Showzuki | Natsumi Tokoda | Resigned on July 31, 2013, after suffering a cervical spine injury. |
| “Remei” Asuka | Unknown | Resigned on January 31, 2015. |
| Saki Kashima | Saki Kashima | Retired on April 23, 2026. |
| Shiki Shibusawa | Unknown | Stardom announced on Shibusawa's retirement on March 10, 2019. |
| Sumire Natsu | Natsuki Urabe | Left on October 4, 2021. |
| Sumire Yoshino | Kaori Okumura | Fired on July 31, 2013. |
| Takumi Iroha | Airi Takubo | Transferred to Marvelous on February 22, 2015. |
| Tam Nakano | Yuria Tauchi | Retired on April 27, 2025 after losing to Saya Kamitani in a Career vs. Career match. |
| Thekla | Thekla Kaischauri | Left on April 27, 2025. Subsequently signed with AEW. |
| Unagi Sayaka | Himawari Unagi | Started freelancing on October 2, 2022, last appeared in Stardom on December 29, 2022, at Dream Queendom 2 and got removed from the official roster page in April 2023 |
| Xena | Xena Kacho | Left on July 8, 2026. |
| Yoko Bito | Yoko Arai | Retired on December 24, 2017. |
| Yoshiko | Yoshiko Hirano | Retired on May 31, 2015. |
| Yuhi | Unknown | Zero1 Norainu Dojo representative. Wrestled final Stardom match before her retirement on March 16, 2014. |
| Yui Yokoo | Unknown | Retired on March 31, 2014, after suffering a knee injury. |
| Yuzuki | Unknown | Left on March 31, 2024 |
| Yuna Manase | Yuuna Suzuki | Resigned on March 8, 2015. |
| Yuuri Haruka | Haruka Kato | Retired on December 31, 2012, after suffering an orbital floor fracture. Returned in October 2013 with Wrestling New Classic. |
| Yuzuki Aikawa | Yuzuki Aikawa | Retired on April 29, 2013. |

=== Notable guests ===
==== Female ====
- Akane Fujita
- Alex Lee
- Alpha Female
- Ancham
- Anna Jay
- Aoi
- Arisa Nakajima
- Bobbi Tyler
- Brandi Rhodes
- Britt Baker
- Cat Power
- Chanyota
- Chelsea Green
- Cherry
- Christina Von Eerie
- Dark Angel / Sarita
- Dash Chisako
- Deonna Purrazzo
- Dump Matsumoto
- Emi Sakura
- Evie
- Faby Apache
- Goya Kong
- Hailey Hatred
- Haruka Umesaki
- Heidi Lovelace
- Hikari Shimizu
- Hikaru Shida
- Hiragi Kurumi
- Hiroyo Matsumoto
- Jessicka Havok
- Jessie
- Kaoru / Infernal Kaoru
- Kellie Skater
- Kelly Klein
- Kizuna Tanaka
- Kyoko Kimura
- Leah Vaughan
- Leon
- Lin Byron
- Madison Eagles
- Makoto
- Manami Toyota
- Mandy Leon
- Mari Apache
- Maria
- Mariah May
- Martina
- Megan Bayne
- Meiko Satomura
- Mei Suruga
- Melina
- Melissa
- Mercedes Martinez
- Mia Yim
- Mika Iwata
- Mio Shirai
- Mitsuo Momota
- Miyako Matsumoto
- Mochi Miyagi
- Momoka Hanazono
- Nanami
- Nao Ishikawa
- Nikki Storm
- Portia Perez
- Ram Kaicho
- Riho
- Rin Kadokura
- Rina Amikura
- Risa Sera
- Rosa Negra / Scorpio Rosa
- Saki
- Santana Garrett
- Sareee
- Sayaka Obihiro
- Scandinavian Hurricane
- Sendai Sachiko
- Shayna
- She Nay Nay
- Star Fire
- Sumie Sakai
- Taya
- Tessa Blanchard
- Thea Trinidad
- Thunder Rosa
- Tomoka Inaba
- Tomoka Nakagawa
- Toni Storm
- Tsubasa Kuragaki
- Tsukasa Fujimoto
- Tsukushi
- Viper
- Xia Brookside
- Yuko Sakurai
- Yuu
- Yuu Yamagata
- Yuuri
- Zoe Lucas

==== Male ====
- Black Tiger
- Danshoku Dino
- Dr. Wagner Jr.
- Gabai-Ji-chan
- Genki Horiguchi H.A.Gee.Mee!!
- Gianni Valletta
- El Hijo de Dr. Wagner Jr.
- Hikaru Sato
- Hiroshi Yamato
- Kenny Omega
- Kinya Oyanagi
- Kota Ibushi
- Kuishinbo Kamen
- Masaaki Mochizuki
- Mil Máscaras
- Minoru Suzuki
- Minoru Tanaka
- Sasuke the Great
- Yoshihiro Takayama

== Stables ==
=== Current ===
- Cosmic Angels
- God's Eye
- H.A.T.E.
- Mi Vida Loca
- Neo Genesis
- Stars

=== Former ===
- Azumi's Army
- Donna Del Mondo
- Empress Nexus Venus
- Full Power Girls
- Heisei-gun
- J.A.N. (Jungle Assault Nation)
- Kawakatsu Plus One (Trouble Maker 2)
- Kimura Monster Army
- Nanae Gundan
- Neo Stardom Army
- Oedo Tai
- Queen's Quest
- PLANET
- Prominence
- Showa-gun
- Tawashis
- Threedom
- Tokyo Cyber Squad
- Zenryoku Joshi

== See also ==
- List of professional wrestling rosters
