= JTO (disambiguation) =

JTO may refer to:

- Jeju Tourism Organization, a public company associated with Jeju Special Self-Governing Province in South Korea
- JTO (professional wrestling), a Japanese professional wrestling promotion and training facility
- Waco JTO, a variant of Waco 10
- Jungsu Choi Tiny Orkester, an experimental large jazz ensemble
- Jeunesse travailleuse de l'Oubangui, a youth movement in Ubangi-Shari/Central African Republic
