= Aoi (wrestler) =

Japanese professional wrestler

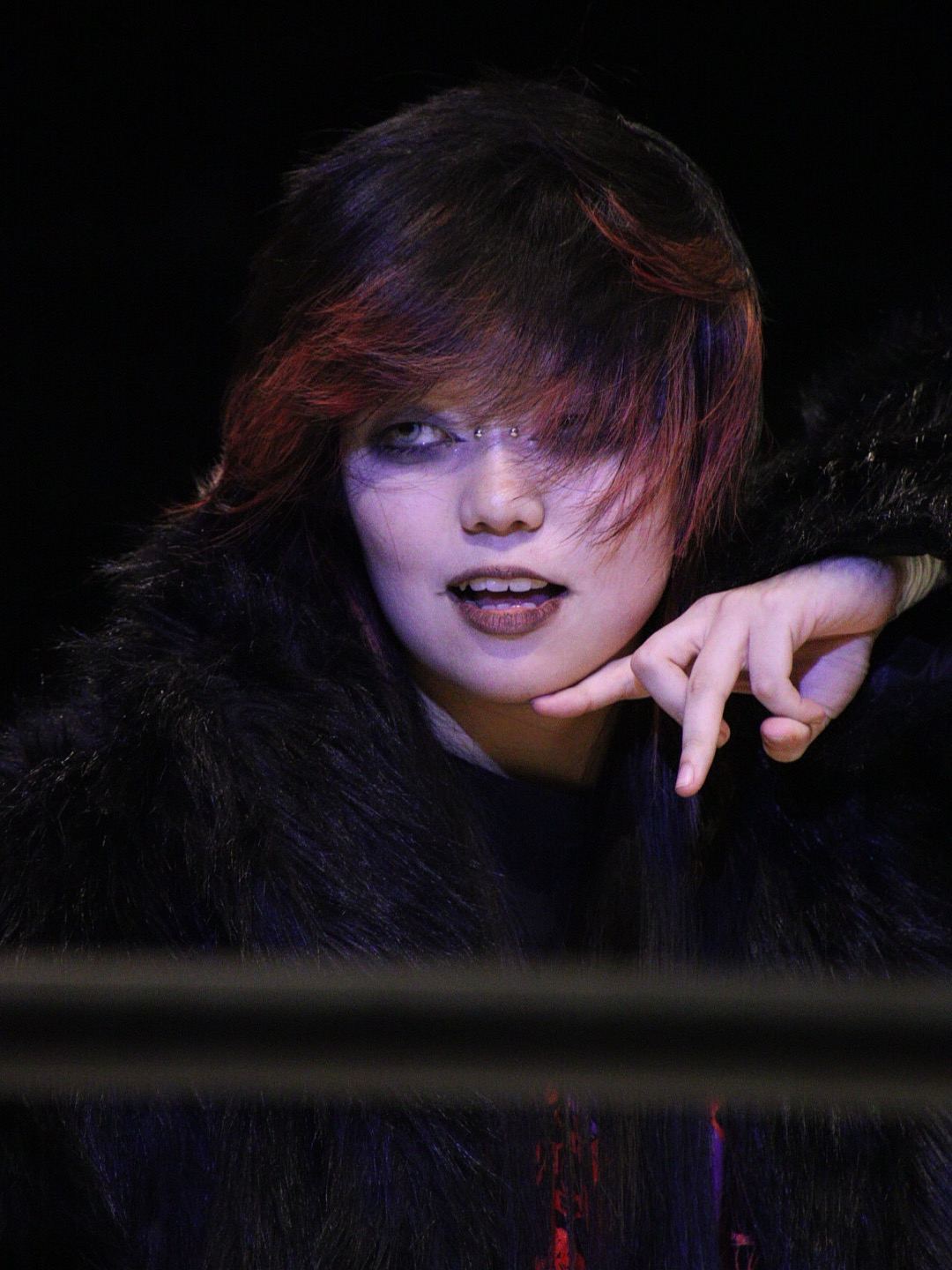
- Aoi in August 2025

Personal information
- Born: July 21, 2002 (age 24) Sapporo, Japan

Professional wrestling career
- Ring name(s): Aoi; Midnight Player
- Billed height: 168 cm (5 ft 6 in)
- Billed weight: 55 kg (121 lb)
- Trained by: Taka Michinoku
- Debut: 2021

Aoi is a Japanese professional wrestler currently working for the Japanese promotion Professional Wrestling Just Tap Out, where she is the current Queen of JTO Champion in her third reign.

== Professional wrestling career ==
=== Independent circuit (2022–present) ===
Aoi began competing for various promotions of the Japanese independent scene. At Sendai Girls SENJO Chronicle 2022 on July 10, she teamed up with Ayame Sasamura and Risa Sera to defeat Manami, Ryo Mizunami and Yuu.

=== Professional Wrestling Just Tap Out (2021–present) ===
Aoi made her professional wrestling debut in JTO, at JTO GIRLS 4 In Yokohama Nigiwaiza, an event produced on May 3, 2021, where she fell short to Misa Kagura. On May 21, 2022, Aoi and Inaba produced their own show, the JTO/Tomoka Inaba & Aoi Produce where Aoi teamed up with Sumika Yanagawa in a losing effort against Prominence's Akane Fujita and Risa Sera. At JTO 3rd Anniversary ~ Iwai on July 9, 2022, Aoi unsuccessfully challenged Tomoka Inaba for both Queen of JTO Championship and Sendai Girls Junior Championship in the finals of the 2022 edition of the JTO Girls Tournament. At JTO TAKA Michinoku Debut 30th Anniversary on September 12, 2022, she teamed up with Tomoka Inaba and fell short to Mirai and Maika, a former JTO wrestler. The match was awarded four stars.

=== World Wonder Ring Stardom (2022–present) ===
Due to JTO being in relationships with World Wonder Ring Stardom, Aoi began to make appearance for the latter promotion by competing in the "New Blood" series of events, which mainly focused on rookie competitors, starting with the first event of its kind from March 11, 2022, where she teamed up with Tomoka Inaba in a losing effort against Stars (Hanan and Saya Iida). On the second night of the Stardom World Climax 2022 from March 27, Aoi competed in an 18-women Cinderella Rumble match won by Mei Suruga and also involving plenty of Stardom's roster wrestlers such as Unagi Sayaka, Mina Shirakawa, Lady C, Saki Kashima, and from the independent scene such as Haruka Umesaki, Maria, Nanami, Yuna Mizumori and others. At Stardom New Blood 2 on May 13, 2022, she teamed up with Tomoka Inaba and went into a time-limit draw against Hanan and Hina. At Stardom New Blood 3 on July 8, Aoi teamed up with Inaba and Misa Kagura in a losing effort against Stars (Hanan, Momo Kohgo and Saya Iida) as a result of a Six-woman tag team match. At Stardom New Blood 4 on August 26, 2022, Aoi unsuccessfully challenged Hanan for the Future of Stardom Championship.

== Championships and accomplishments ==
- Professional Wrestling Just Tap Out
  - Queen of JTO Championship (3 times, current)
  - JTO Girls Championship (1 time)
  - JTO Girls Tag Team Championship (3 times, inaugural) – with Tomoka Inaba (1), Azusa Inaba (1), and HisokA (1)
  - The First Triple Crown Champion
  - JTO Girls Tag Team Title Tournament (2024) - with Tomoka Inaba
