= Queen of JTO Championship =

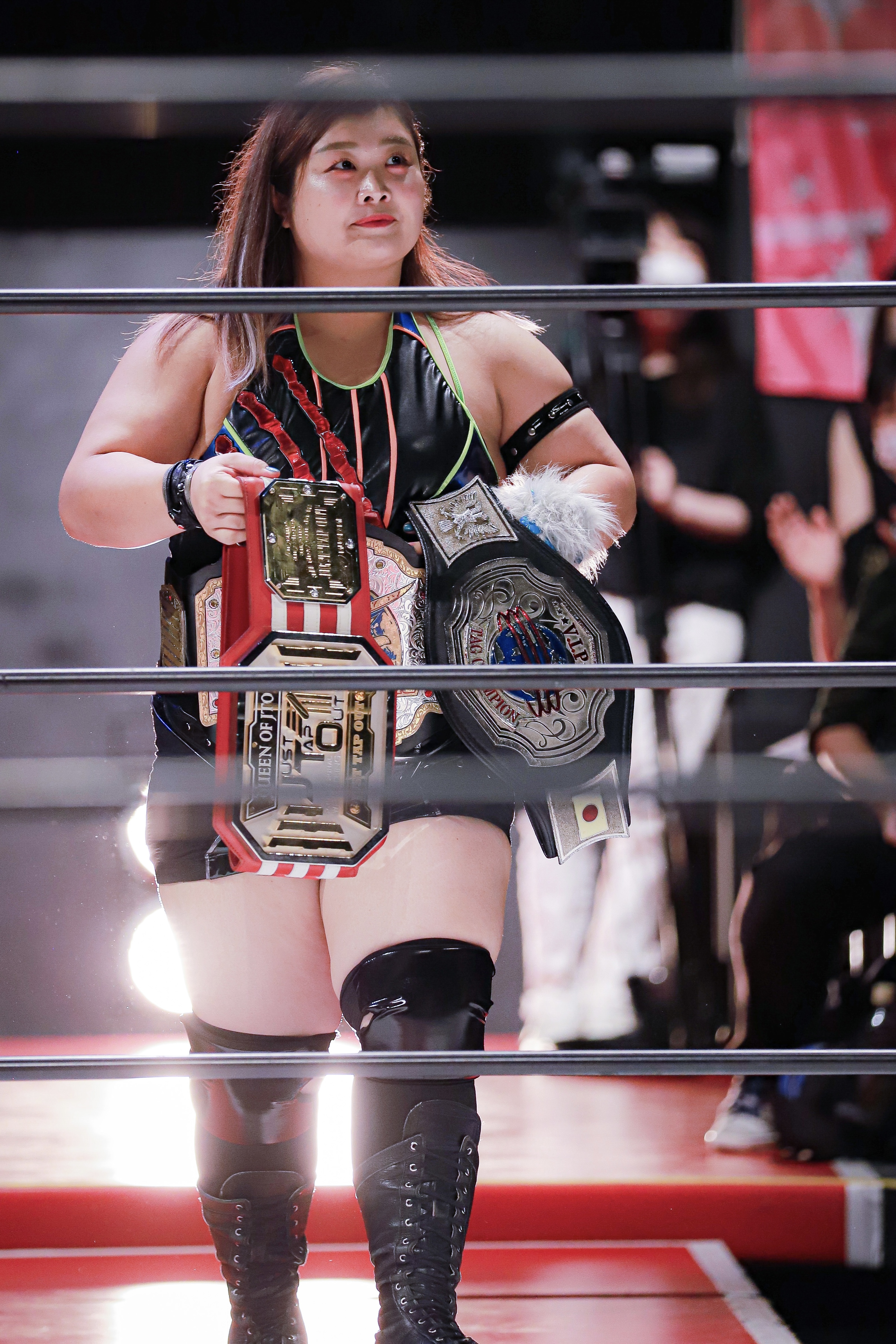
- Yuu holding the current belt design in her right hand

Details
- Promotion: Professional Wrestling Just Tap Out
- Date established: December 6, 2020
- Current champion: Aoi
- Date won: October 10, 2026
Statistics
- First champion: Aki Shizuku
- Most reigns: Tomoka Inaba (4 reigns)
- Longest reign: Azusa Inaba (456 days)
- Shortest reign: Aoi (57 days)
- Oldest champion: Yuu Yamagata (45 years, 135 days)
- Youngest champion: Azusa Inaba (17 years, 224 days)
- Heaviest champion: Yuu (209 lbs)
- Lightest champion: Sumika Yanagawa (110 lbs)

Queen of JTO Championship is a women's professional wrestling championship owned by the Professional Wrestling Just Tap Out (JTO) promotion where it represents the female's top accomplishment. There have been a total of twelve reigns shared between seven different champions. The current title holder is Aoi, who is in her third reign.

== Title history ==
At the time of Professional Wrestling Just Tap Out establishment in 2020, a championship belt was not immediately produced, but instead, a ranking system was launched, later activating under the name of "JTO Girls Ranking" based on JTO rules that differed from other organizations.

On December 6, 2020, Aki Shizuku won the inaugural "JTO Girls Tournament" held at the Professional Wrestling Just Tap Out (later JTO) Wrestle Butoukan tournament and became the first champion. In 2022, a championship belt was created with the help of voters. The design of the title is still used today.

== Reigns ==
Key
No.	Overall reign number
Reign	Reign number for the specific champion
Days	Number of days held
Defenses	Number of successful defenses
<1	Reign lasted less than a day
+	Current reign is changing daily

No.	Champion	Championship change			Reign statistics			Notes	Ref.
No.	Champion	Date	Event	Location	Reign	Days	Defenses	Notes	Ref.
1	Aki Shizuku	December 6, 2020	JTO GIRLS Tournament	Saitama, Japan	1	213	3	Defeated Tomoka Inaba in a tournament final to become the inaugural champion.	
2	Tomoka Inaba	July 7, 2021	JTO Just Tap Out 2nd Anniversary Iwai	Tokyo, Japan	1	134	2		
3	Yuu Yamagata	November 18, 2021	JTO Itadaki	Tokyo, Japan	1	199	2		
4	Tomoka Inaba	June 5, 2022	JTO	Yokohama, Japan	2	383	4	This was a JTO Girls 2022 Tournament semi-final match.	
5	Yuu	June 23, 2023	JTO	Tokyo, Japan	1	140	2	This was the JTO Girls 2023 Tournament final match.	
6	Aoi	November 10, 2023	JTO J1 League & GIRLS League Finals	Tokyo, Japan	1	57	0		
7	Tomoka Inaba	January 6, 2024	JTO Girls Special	Tokyo, Japan	3	236	1		
8	Aoi	August 29, 2024	JTO Girls Special	Tokyo, Japan	2	120	3		
9	Sumika Yanagawa	December 27, 2024	JTO Hatsu	Yokohama, Japan	1	65	2		
10	Tomoka Inaba	March 2, 2025	JTO Girls Special In Osaka	Osaka, Japan	4	131	0		
11	Azusa Inaba	July 11, 2025	JTO 6th Anniversary	Tokyo, Japan	1	456	3		
12	Aoi	October 10, 2026	JTO	Yokohama, Japan	3	42+	0		

== Combined reigns ==
As of November 21, 2026.

†	Indicates the current champion

Rank	Wrestler	No. of reigns	Combined defenses	Combined days
1	Tomoka Inaba	4	7	884
2	Azusa Inaba	1	3	456
3	Aoi †	3	3	219+
4	Aki Shizuku	1	3	213
5	Yuu Yamagata	1	2	199
6	Yuu	1	2	140
7	Sumika Yanagawa	1	2	65
