= Jeju Tourism Organization =

South Korean government-sponsored company

- 제주관광공사
- Formation: 2008
- Headquarters: Jeju Welcome Center
- Region served: Jeju Special Self-Governing Province
- Website: http://www.visitjeju.net

The Jeju Tourism Organization (JTO; Korean: 제주관광공사) is a public company associated with Jeju Special Self-Governing Province in South Korea. It is tasked with promoting Jeju Island's tourism industry domestically and internationally.

The JTO was established in 2008 as a government-invested corporation promoting Jeju Island as a tourist destination for both domestic and international tourists. Its headquarters, called the Jeju Welcome Center, is located in the Yeon-dong neighborhood of Jeju City, near the Jeju provincial government complex.

Its mandate includes:

- Integrated public relations and marketing
- Tour product development (local and international)
- Research and support for the local tourism industry
- Hosting international tourism-related events and conferences (ITOP Forum, Asia Cruise Forum)
- Surveys, smart tourism, big data projects and other research areas
- For-profit duty-free business operations

The JTO operates a Jeju travel information website VisitJeju.net in multiple languages (Korean, English, Chinese, Japanese) as well as the Jeju Tourist Information Center.

Prior to the COVID-19 pandemic, inbound travelers to Jeju topped 15 million domestic and 1.5 million international visitors. The visa policy of Jeju Province, which varies from that of the South Korean mainland, applied to 180 nationalities and allowed for stays of up to 30 days when arriving directly from overseas. It has since been suspended due to national and provincial pandemic prevention measures.

== History ==
- 1946: Jeju Airport begins operation.
- 1959: Seogwipo Tourist Hotel opens.
- 1963: Jeju-Mokpo ferry route begins operation.
- 1973: Jeju Tourism Office established.
- 1980: Visa-free entry (15 days) program for foreigners begins.
- 1985: Jeju Information Center opens at Jeju International Airport.
- 1992: Korea-China Friendship
- 1996: Japanese Consulate opens.
- 1998: World Island Cultural Festival opens.
- 2002: Biosphere Reserve designation
- 2004: UNEP, PATA, ADB Jeju Conference opens.
- 2007: UNESCO World Natural Heritage designation
- 2007: Jeju Olle walking trail system opens.
- 2008: Jeju Tourism Organization established.
- 2010: Global Geopark Network designation
- 2012: Chinese Consulate opens in Jeju.
- 2013: A record 10 million visitors arrive in one year.
- 2015: A record 13 million visitors arrive in one year.
- 2016: Jeju Special Self-Governing Province establishes a tourism department.

== See also ==
- Korea Tourism Organization
- Seoul Tourism Organization
