= Tomoka Inaba =

Japanese professional wrestler

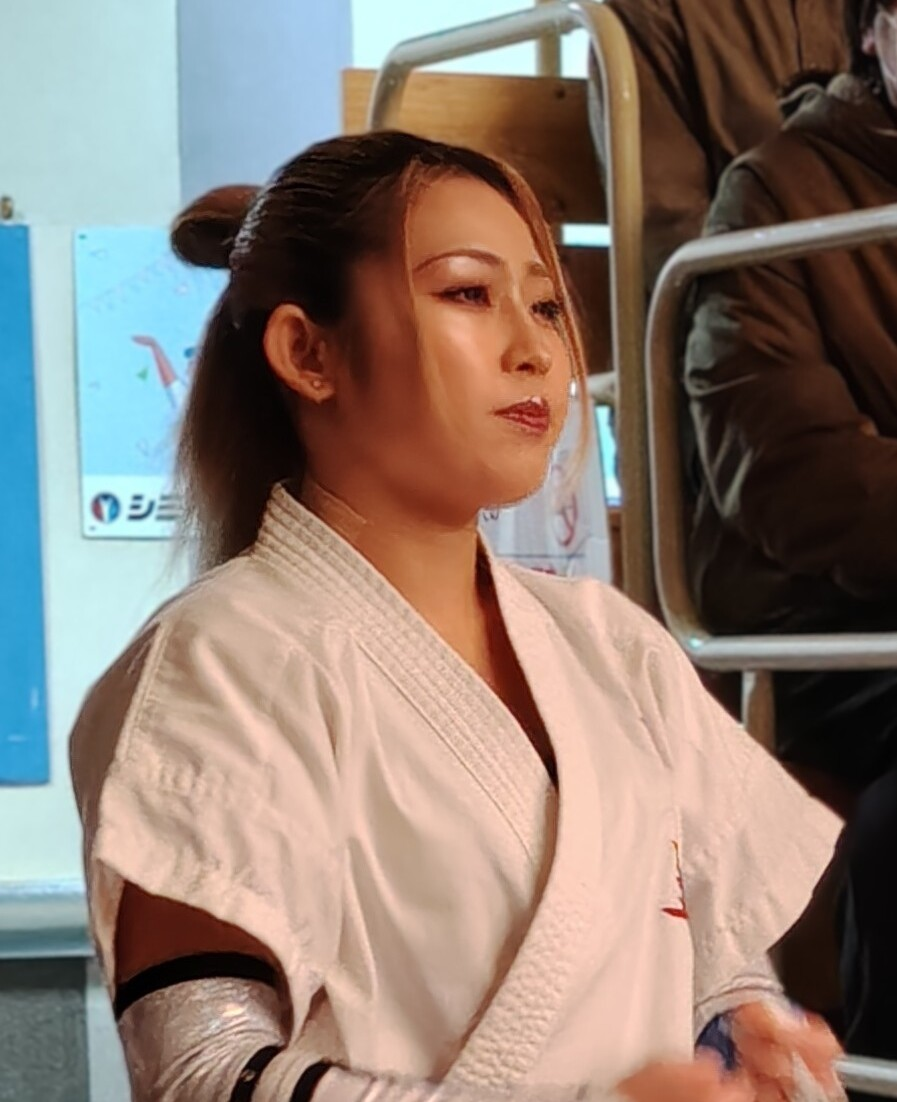
- Inaba in February 2026

Personal information
- Born: July 24, 2002 (age 24) Toyokawa, Aichi, Japan
- Family: Azusa Inaba (sister)

Professional wrestling career
- Ring name(s): Stray Cat; Tomoka Inaba
- Billed height: 154 cm (5 ft 1 in)
- Billed weight: 54 kg (119 lb)
- Trained by: Taka Michinoku
- Debut: 2019

Tomoka Inaba (稲葉ともか, Inaba Tomoka; born July 24, 2002) is a Japanese professional wrestler. She is signed to Professional Wrestling Just Tap Out, where she is one-half of the current JTO Girls Tag Team Champions in her third reign. She also appears with JTO’s partners World Wonder Ring Stardom, where she is a member of God's Eye. She is well known for working with other independent promotions such as Sendai Girls' Pro Wrestling and Pro Wrestling Wave.

== Professional wrestling career ==
=== Professional Wrestling Just Tap Out (2019–present) ===
Inaba made her professional wrestling debut in Professional Wrestling Just Tap Out (often known as JTO) as one of Taka Michinoku's trainees on July 8, 2019, by teaming up with Giulia and Kaori Yoneyama and defeating Saori Anou, Rhythm and Koharu Hinata as a result of a six-man tag team match. At CMLL Lady's Ring, an event promoted by JTO in partnership with Consejo Mundial de Lucha Libre on September 17, 2019, Inaba teamed up with Mima Shimoda to defeat Maika and Sonya.

=== Independent circuit (2019–present) ===
Inaba is known for working as a freelancer in the Japanese independent scene.

=== Pro Wrestling Wave (2020–present) ===
One of the other promotions in which she competed is Pro Wrestling Wave. She made her first appearance at a house show from July 7, 2020, where she teamed up with Ayumi Hayashi and Suzu Suzuki to wrestle Crea, Haruka Umesaki and Mikoto Shindo into a fifteen-minute time-limit draw. Inaba also participated in one of the promotion's signature events, the Catch the Wave tournament, making her first appearance at the 2021 edition, placing herself in the "Potential Block" and scoring a total of two points after going against Miyuki Takase, Mio Momono and Sakura Hirota. She won the 2021 edition of the "Young Block Oh! Oh!", the rookie branch of the Catch the Wave tournament by winning the "Block A" with a total of five points, also involving Ami Miura, Ai Houzan and Shizuku Tsukata. Inaba defeated Chie Ozora in the finals from May 28.

=== World Wonder Ring Stardom (2022–present) ===
Inaba's first appearance into a World Wonder Ring Stardom ring occurred on March 11, 2022, at Stardom New Blood 1, an event created to promote rookie talent, where she teamed up with Aoi as team JTO in a losing effort against Stars stable members Saya Iida and Hanan. She competed in a Cinderella Rumble match on the second night of the Stardom World Climax 2022 from March 27, match won by Mei Suruga and also involving notable opponents such as Unagi Sayaka, Mina Shirakawa, Lady C, Saki Kashima and many others. Inaba continued to perform mainly in the New Blood series of events. At Stardom New Blood 2 on May 13, 2022, she teamed up with Aoi in a losing effort against Hanan and Hina. At Stardom New Blood 3 on July 8, 2022, Inaba teamed up with Aoi and Misa Kagura in a losing effort against Stars (Hanan, Momo Kohgo & Saya Iida). At Stardom New Blood 4 on August 26, 2022, Inaba defeated Hina in the first match. The fifth match of the evening saw God's Eye's (Mirai & Ami Sourei) defeating Starlight Kid & Haruka Umesaki via disqualification when Umesaki assaulted Mirai with a steel chair in front of the referee. After the match, Oedo Tai attacks God's Eye until Inaba came to the ring for the save. Syuri and Inaba then shook hands as Inaba became the newest member of God's Eye. At Stardom New Blood 5 on October 19, 2022, Inaba teamed up with Mirai and Nanami in a losing effort against Karma and Oedo Tai (Ruaka and Starlight Kid). At Stardom Gold Rush on November 19, 2022, she teamed up with Ami Sourei and Mirai and fell short to Stars (Hazuki, Koguma & Mayu Iwatani) in the first rounds of a "moneyball tournament". Inaba made her first appearance in the Goddesses of Stardom Tag League at the 2022 edition where she teamed up with Syuri as "Karate Brave" and fought in the "Red Goddess Block" against the teams of AphrOditE (Utami Hayashishita and Saya Kamitani), Mafia Bella (Giulia and Thekla), meltear (Tam Nakano and Natsupoi), Black Desire (Momo Watanabe and Starlight Kid), Peach☆Rock (Mayu Iwatani and Momo Kohgo), We Love Tokyo Sports (Saki Kashima and Fukigen Death), and Mai Fair Lady (Mai Sakurai and Lady C).

== Championships and accomplishments ==
- Pro Wrestling Illustrated
  - Ranked No. 129 of the top 250 female wrestlers in the PWI Women's 250 in 2025
- Pro Wrestling Wave
  - Young Block Oh! Oh! (2021)
- Professional Wrestling Just Tap Out
  - Queen of JTO Championship (4 times)
  - JTO Girls Championship (1 time)
  - JTO Girls Tag Team Championship (3 times, inaugural, current) – with Aoi (1); Rhythm (1); Mirai (1)
  - The Third Triple Crown Champion
  - JTO Girls Tournament (2022, 2024)
  - JTO Girls Tag Team Title Tournament (2024) – with Aoi
- Sendai Girls' Pro Wrestling
  - Sendai Girls Junior Championship (1 time)
