= Sumika Yanagawa =

Japanese professional wrestler

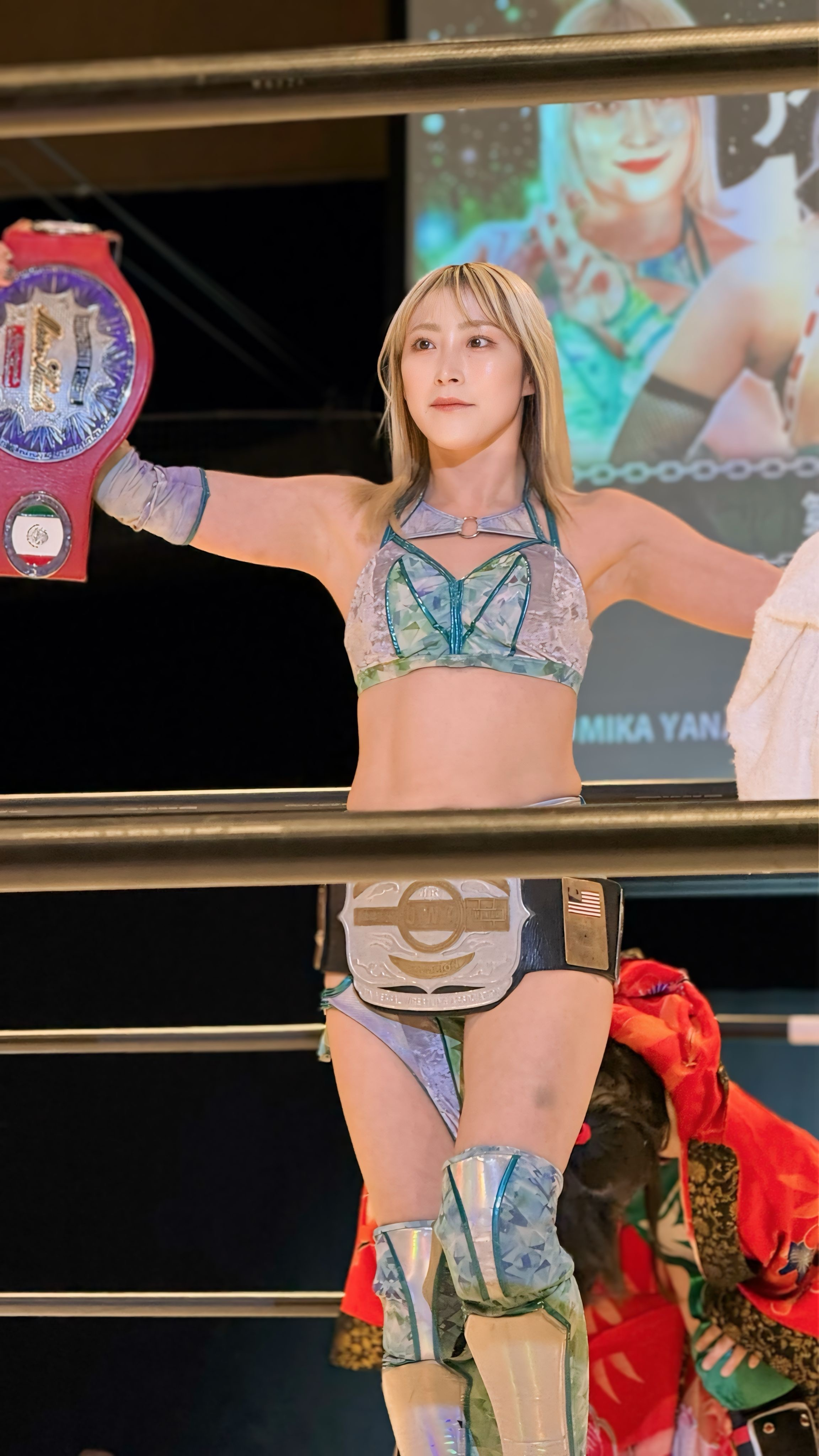
- Yanagawa in May 2024

Personal information
- Born: February 13, 1991 (age 35) Yamagata, Japan

Professional wrestling career
- Ring name: Trainee K Sumika Yanagawa
- Billed height: 160 cm (5 ft 3 in)
- Billed weight: 50 kg (110 lb)
- Debut: 2020

Sumika Yanagawa (柳川澄樺, Yangawa Sumika) is a Japanese professional wrestler currently signed to Professional Wrestling Just Tap Out (JTO), where she is a former one-time Queen of JTO Champion. She also makes appearances in Ice Ribbon, where she is the current ICE Cross Infinity Champion and had other stints with various promotions from the Japanese independent scene.

== Professional wrestling career ==
=== Professional Wrestling Just Tap Out (2020–present) ===
Yanagawa made her professional wrestling debut in Professional Wrestling Just Tap Out at JTO GIRLS 3 under the ring name of "Trainee K" on September 27, 2020, where she defeated "Trainee Y" (Yuuri) in an exhibition match. At the 2023 edition of the JTO J1 League & GIRLS League, Yanagawa reached the finals of the women's tournament where she fell short to Misa Kagura in a match also disputed for the inaugural JTO Girls Championship. At JTO Michinoku The Super Best 2024 on May 10, Yanagawa won an Akama style battle royal disputed for the UWA World Light Heavyweight Championship in which she defeated reigning champion Naoya Akama and ARA, Arata, Blazer Tanni, Kensuke, Maxi, Mizuna and Mr. Mask. She became the first ever female wrestler to hold the title.

==== Pure-J (2021–present) ====
Yangawa often competes in Pure-J as developmental talent sent by JTO. She made her first appearance at PURE-J 4th Anniversary ~ Rainbow Mountain 2021 on August 9, where she unsuccessfully challenged Akari for the Princess of Pro Wrestling Championship. She eventually succeeded in winning the title at JTO Sumika Yanagawa Triumphant Return, a shoe produced for herself on November 23, 2023, where she defeated tag team partner Misa Kagura.

=== Ice Ribbon (2022–present) ===
Yanagawa made her debut in Ice Ribbon at Ice Ribbon New Ice Ribbon #1170 on January 8, 2022, where she teamed up with Kaho Matsushita in a losing effort against Tsukasa Fujimoto and Yuki Mashiro. During her time in the promotion, she chased for various titles. At Yokohama Ribbon 2022 on May 28, she fell short to Amin in the first rounds of a tournament for the vacant ICE Cross Infinity Championship. At Ice Ribbon New Ice Ribbon #1297 on August 26, 2023, Yanagawa teamed up with Misa Kagura and defeated reigning team Mukomako (Makoto and Hamuko Hoshi) and Akari and Yappy in a three-way tag team match to win the International Ribbon Tag Team Championship. At Ice Ribbon New Ice Ribbon #1268 on March 25, 2023, Yanagawa competed in a gauntlet match where all participants fought against Nao Ishikawa and involved various wrestlers such as Satsuki Totoro, Momo Tani, Mio Shirai, Ibuki Hoshi, Banny Oikawa and many others.

At Ice Ribbon New Ice Ribbon #1507 on August 9, 2026, Yanagawa defeated Kaho Matsushita to win the ICE Cross Infinity Championship.

=== Pro Wrestling Wave (2021–2022) ===
Yanagawa made her debut in Pro Wrestling Wave while competing in the 2021 edition of the Catch the Wave tournament in which she evolved in the block B of the "Young Block" branch where she scored a total of three points after going against Chie Ozora, Waka Tsukiyama and Yappy, failing to qualify for the finals. At WAVE Survival Dance ~ Regina Challenge on October 24, 2022, Yanagawa competed in a number one contendership battle royal for the Wave Single Championship won by Yuki Miyazaki and also involving various notable opponents such as Akane Fujita, Asuka, Cherry, Kaori Yoneyama, Miyako Matsumoto, Sakura Hirota and many others.

=== Consejo Mundial de Lucha Libre (2024–present) ===
On February 25, 2024 at CMLL Lady's Ring Lucha Fiesta Sumika Yanagawa defeats Honoka and Kizuna Tanaka and Misa Kagura and ZONES to be the first champion of the Mexico Kanko Title to be able to go participate and train in Mexico. On September 25, 2024, his participation in the 2024 CMLL Grand Prix de Amazonas was announced. On October 18, Sumika Yanagawa and Sayaka Unagi made their debut at the Arena Mexico losing against Tessa Blanchard and Lluvia for the CMLL World Women's Tag Team Championship

== Championships and accomplishments ==
- Consejo Mundial de Lucha Libre
  - Mexico Kanko Championship (1 time, inaugural)
- Ice Ribbon
  - ICE Cross Infinity Championship (1 time, current)
  - International Ribbon Tag Team Championship (2 times) – with Misa Kagura (1) and Makoto (1)
- Professional Wrestling Just Tap Out
  - Queen of JTO Championship (1 time)
  - JTO Girls Tag Team Championship (3 times) – with Misa Kagura
  - UWA World Middleweight Championship (1 time)
- Pure-J
  - Princess of Pro-Wrestling Championship (1 time)
