= Jungsu Choi Tiny Orkester =

Jungsu Choi Tiny Orkester (JTO) is an experimental large jazz ensemble comprising ten performers and composer, Jungsu Choi.

JTO's European debut album Tschüss Jazz Era was released on Challenge Records, followed by a stage appearance at BIMHUIS, Amsterdam. Their music is recognized as unique reinterpretation of old jazz standards such as "Anthropology", "Spain", and "Take the 'A' Train" (retitled as "What if Ellington Didn't Take the A Train?"). JTO was nominated for Korean Music Awards 2019 (category: best jazz performance of the year).

== Background ==
JTO is led by Jungsu Choi (born 1975), a Korean composer, arranger and band leader based in Europe and Korea. His composition is mainly focusing on big jazz ensemble but also electronic and diverse ensemble. His primary artistic vehicle is JTO.

Members

- Jungsu Choi – Composer, Arranger and Band leader
- Jinho Pyo – Male voice
- Eunmi Kim – Flute
- Youngkwang Kim – Alto saxophone
- Hachul Song – Tenor saxophone
- Yeajung Kim – Trumpet
- Junyeon Lee – Trombone
- Jungyun Ahn – Cello
- Jungmin Lee – Piano
- Sungyun Hong – Guitar
- Inseob Song – Bass
- Hyunsu Lee – Drums

== Discography ==
- Jungsu Choi New Jazz Orchestra in London The Big band (Good International, 2011)
- Jungsu Choi Music Electric Portrait - The Dance (Pison Contents, 2015)
- Jungsu Choi Tiny Orkester Tschuss Jazz Era (Challenge Records, 2018)
