= Ubangi Young Workers =

Political youth movement in the Central African Republic

Ubangi Young Workers (French: Jeunesse travailleuse de l'Oubangui, abbreviated JTO) was a youth movement in Ubangi-Shari/Central African Republic. The organization was founded in 1956. JTO was a union of young workers and struggled against imperialism. JTO was a member organization of the World Federation of Democratic Youth.

JTO was repressed and banned during the presidency of David Dacko.
