= Smart tourism =

Field of information and communication technology

Smart tourism is an important component of a smart city. Tourism is one of the major components of economic growth for communities worldwide. A key requirement of tourism has been to attract more and more tourists from different parts of the world. Smart tourism refers to the application of information and communication technology, such similar to the smart cities, for developing innovative tools and approaches to improve tourism. Smart tourism is reliant on core technologies such as ICT, mobile communication, cloud computing, artificial intelligence, and virtual reality. It supports integrated efforts at a destination to find innovative ways to collect and use data derived from physical infrastructure, social connectedness and organizational sources (both government and non-government), and users in combination with advanced technologies to increase efficiency, sustainability, experiences. The information and communication technology tools used for smart tourism include IoT, mobile communication, cloud computing, and artificial intelligence. It combines physical, informational, social, and commercial infrastructure of tourism with such tools to provide smart tourism opportunities. The principles of smart tourism lie at enhancing tourism experiences, improve the efficiency of resource management, maximize destination competitiveness with an emphasis on sustainable aspects. It should also gather and distribute information to facilitate efficient allocation of tourism resources and integrate tourism supplies at a micro and macro level ensuring that the benefits are well distributed. They are observed to be effective in technologically advanced destinations such as smart cities.

== Smart Tourism Destinations ==
Any destination can be a smart tourist destination if it consists of the following;

- Soft smartness; includes collaborations, innovation, and leadership
- Hard smartness; refers to all the technology and infrastructure

However, the availability of any of the above does not make for a smart destination. It depends on the availability of hardsmartness which enables improvement of human capital and smart decisions based on the application of technology and infrastructure.

Smart tourism requires the following attributes:

1. Technology embedded environments
2. Responsive processes at micro and macro levels
3. End-user devices
4. Stakeholders that actively use smart platforms

== Smart Tourism Tools ==
Smart tourism tools refer to a combination of mobile hardware, software, and networks to enable interaction between tourists, stakeholders, and physical objects. The communication must be able to provide personalized services and real-time information for making smart decisions. Three specific smart tourism tools are mobile applications, augmented reality, and near-field communications.

=== Applications ===
Applications must be able to provide information which will help tourists in making informed choices such as making reservations, translation services, direction guidance. Audio guidance, etc. It should also allow real-time communication between stakeholders and customers.

Examples include ViaHero which allows users to have personalized trips created with the help of local residents.

=== Augmented Reality ===
It is an experience augmenting a real-world environment with information with the help of smartphone or lens systems. It can contribute significantly to cultural tourism.

An example includes AR at a Roman theater which allows users to point their phone at the arena and watch a gladiator fight.

=== Near Field Communications ===
NFC can be mostly used mostly in tourist places such as museums and which allows tourists to scan information points at paintings/ sculptures/ historical artifacts which then allows the phone to provide translations. The NFC however, requires a compatible device.

Each location calls for the application of different tools. Both tourists and destinations benefit from smart tourism. Benefit for destinations includes economic reward, potential FDI, preservation of cultural heritage, etc. while for the tourists include convenience, reduction in expenses, to name a few.

== Challenges of Smart Tourism ==
Reliance on smart devices for running applications and power for the functioning of the system.

The existence of a gap between digital and non-digital devices. It does not cater to the needs of those who want to experience tourism outside of the smart city realm.

Higher amounts of knowledge and infrastructure.

Enterprises which are already affected by tourism will be further pushed down with the onset of smart tourism.
