= Yuu (wrestler) =

Japanese professional wrestler

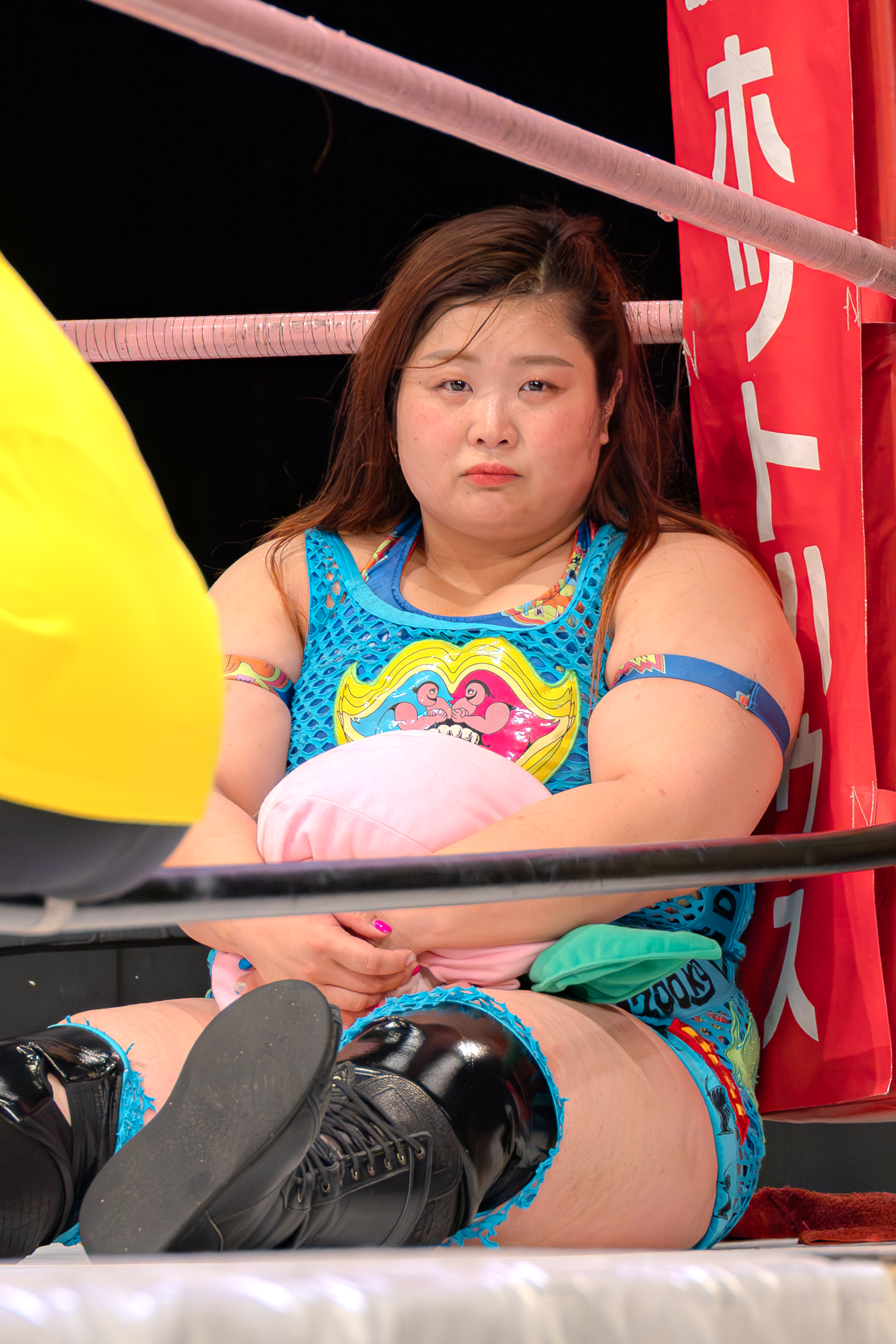
- Yuu in December 2025

Personal information
- Born: July 19, 1991 (age 35) Chiba, Japan

Professional wrestling career
- Ring name(s): Crush Yuu; Yuu
- Billed height: 156 cm (5 ft 1 in)
- Billed weight: 95 kg (209 lb)
- Trained by: Cherry; Koichiro Kimura
- Debut: 2016
- Retired: December 28, 2025

Yuu (優宇, Yū; born July 19, 1991) is a Japanese retired professional wrestler best known for her tenure with the Japanese professional wrestling promotions Sendai Girls' Pro Wrestling, Oz Academy, World Wonder Ring Stardom and DDT Pro Wrestling.

== Professional wrestling career ==
=== Independent circuit (2016–2025) ===
In 2019 Yuu competed outside of Japan for many promotions. At wXw 16 Carat Gold 2019, an event promoted by Westside Xtreme Wrestling on March 9, Yuu teamed up with Killer Kelly to defeat Toni Storm and Wesna. Yuu competed in the United Kingdom for Pro-Wrestling: EVE, and at EVE Dawn Of A New Era on July 13, 2019, she faced Kasey and Millie McKenzie in a tournament for a chance to Pro-Wrestling: EVE Championship, falling short to the latter in the semi-finals. She also worked for Revolution Pro Wrestling at RevPro New Year's Resolution on January 11, 2019, where she unsuccessfully challenged Zoe Lucas for the RevPro British Women's Championship.

Yuu is known for her time in various promotions in Japan. At Seadlinnng Shin-Kiba 19th Night, an event which took place on November 7, 2019, she teamed up with Ayame Sasamura in a losing effort to Max Voltage (Miyuki Takase and Nanae Takahashi). She made an appearance in the Sendai Girls Royal Tag Tournament 2019 where she teamed up with to defeat Meiko Satomura and Syuri in the first-round, Alex Lee and Charli Evans in the semi-finals, but fell short to Dash Chisako and Hiroyo Matsumoto in the finals on December 11, 2019. Yuu also works for Oz Academy, being a part of the Beast Friend stable. At OZ Academy Plum Hanasaku, an event from August 28, 2020, she teamed up with fellow stablemates Aja Kong, Kaori Yoneyama and Hiroyo Matsumoto who was the Blast Queen Champion, and helped her defend her title in a super plasma death tag team match against Mission K4 (Akino, Kaho Kobayashi, Kakeru Sekiguchi and Sonoko Kato).

=== DDT Pro Wrestling (2016–2019) ===
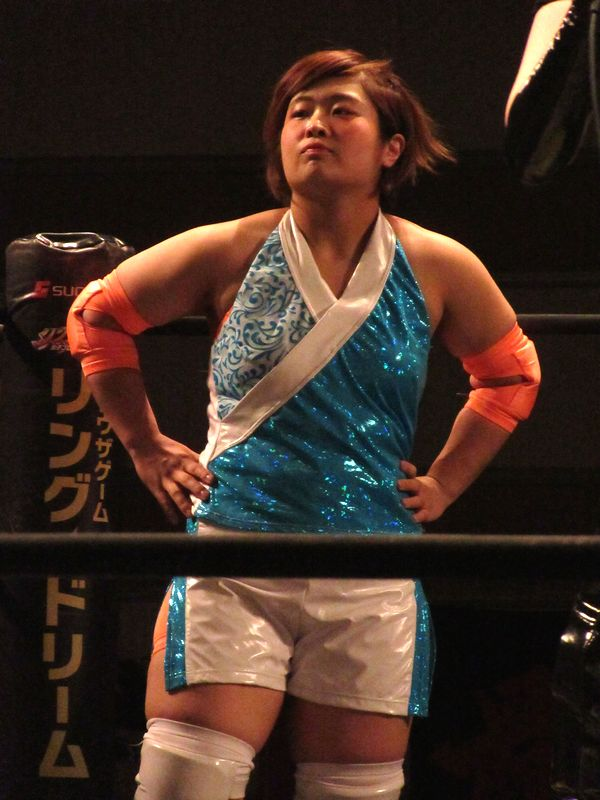
Yuu in August 2016

Yuu is known for her tenure with DDT Pro Wrestling and marked sporadic appearances in signature events of the promotion. At DDT Is Coming to America, the first-ever event of DDT to take place into the United States, she participated in a Delayed battle royale for the Ironman Heavymetalweight Championship for a Right To Challenge Anytime, Anywhere contract also involving Kazuki Hirata, Saki Akai, Kikutaro, Colt Cabana, Mizuki Watase and Makoto Oishi.

She worked several times in the DDT Judgement events. At Judgement 2016: DDT 19th Anniversary on March 21, she participated in a 13-woman battle royal also involving Yuka Sakazaki, Ai Shimizu, Shoko Nakajima and others. At Judgement 2017: DDT 20th Anniversary on March 20, Yuu teamed up with Mil Clown and Maki Itoh to defeat Reika Saiki, Rika Tatsumi and Azusa Takigawa in a six-woman tag team match.

She also competed in the DDT Peter Pan branch of events. At Ryōgoku Peter Pan 2016 on August 28, she teamed up with Hyper Misao and Shoko Nakajima in a losing effort to Akane Miura, Miyu Yamashita and Yuka Sakazaki. At Ryōgoku Peter Pan 2017 on August 20, she won a Rumble rules match for the Ironman Heavymetalweight Championship also involving Mizuki, her trainer Cherry, Yuna Manase, Maho Kurone and others.

=== Pro Wrestling Wave (2019–2025) ===
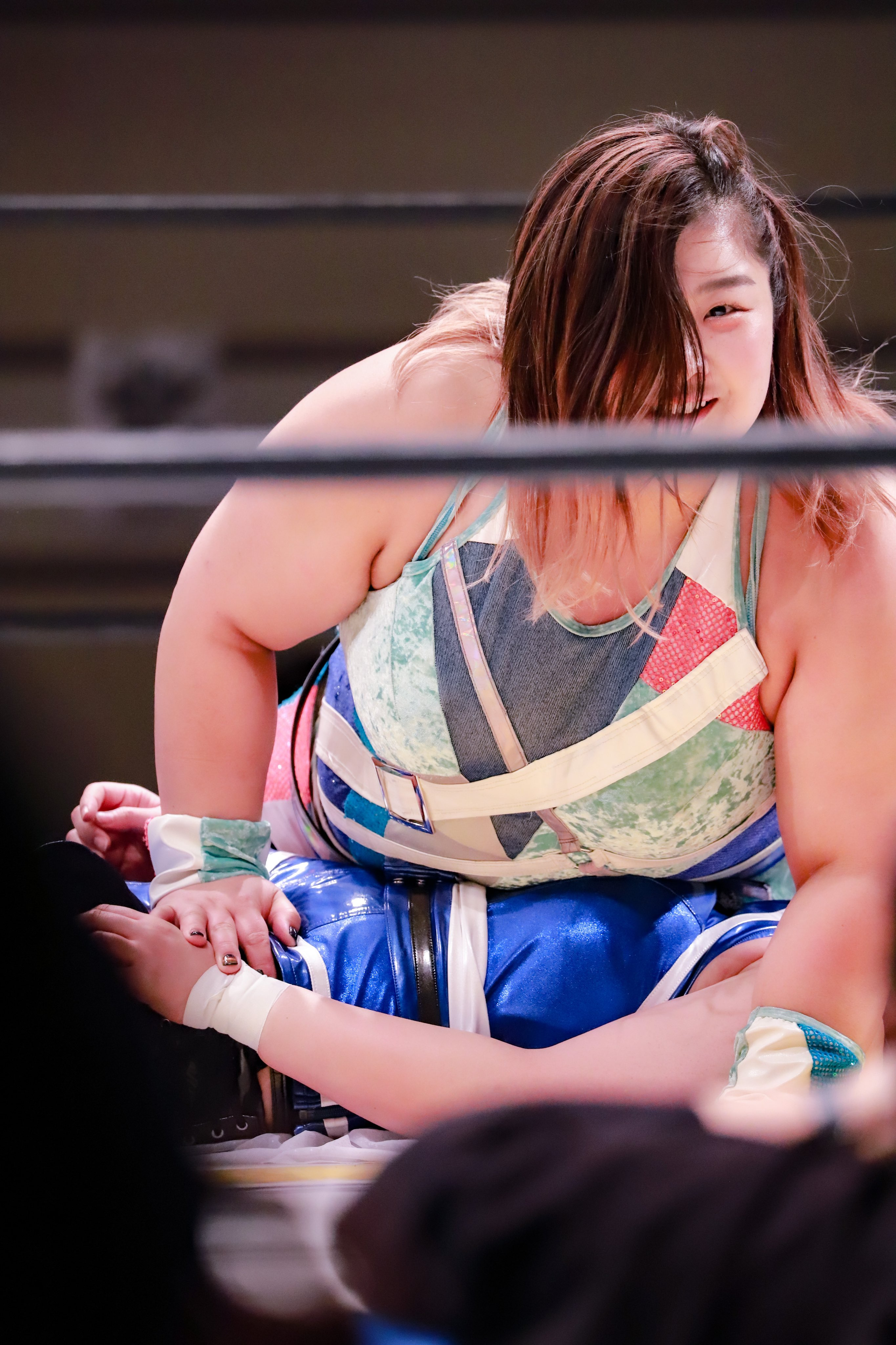
Yuu in December 2022

Yuu worked her first marches in Pro Wrestling Wave at the 2019 edition of Catch the Wave, where she placed herself in the "Power Block" and scored a total of two points after competing against Yuki Miyazaki, Ryo Mizunami and Miyuki Takase. She continued to make sporadic appearances for the promotion, such as at WAVE Hakodate event from September 16, 2019, where she participated in a 14-person battle royal also involving Hikaru Shida, Arisa Nakajima, Yumi Ohka and others.

=== Tokyo Joshi Pro Wrestling (2016–2018) ===
Yuu made her professional wrestling debut for Tokyo Joshi Pro Wrestling at TJPW Tokyo Joshi Pro '16 on January 4, 2016, where she picked up a victory over Nodoka-Oneesan. She won her first title at TJPW Shinjuku Love Rin on June 4, 2017, the Princess of Princess Championship by defeating Miyu Yamashita. She won the 2018 Tokyo Princess Cup by defeating Reika Saiki in a first-round match, Hyper Misao in a second-round, Nodoka-Oneesan in the semi-finals and Yuka Sakazaki in the finals on July 8, 2018.

=== World Wonder Ring Stardom (2022–2025) ===
Yuu would have her first World Wonder Ring Stardom sanctioned match in June 2019 as part of Stardom's UK tour with Pro Wrestling: EVE where she was defeated by Utami Hayashishita. She would later make her official debut by frequently attacking Stardom's president Rossy Ogawa and other superstars such as Saya Kamitani and Starlight Kid under a reaper mask costume for weeks between June and July, 2022. At the Stardom in Showcase vol.1, she revealed herself as the mysterious competitor while fighting in a Three-way casket match against Kamitani and Kid which she won. At Stardom in Showcase vol.2 on September 25, 2022, Yuu worked into a non-canon storyline where she, Nanae Takahashi and Yuna Manase who teamed up as two masked reapers, defeated Syuri, and Queen's Quest's Utami Hayashishita and Lady C who were billed as Rossy Ogawa's "Bodyguard Army". After the pay-per-view came to an end, Alpha Female reached out via taped video in which she teased the formation of the Neo Stardom Army unit alongside Takahashi, Yuu and Manase. At the 2022 edition of the Goddesses of Stardom Tag League, Yuu teamed up with Nanae Takahashi as "7Upp" and won the whole tournament by winning the "Blue Goddess Block" with a total of eleven points scored after competing against the teams of FWC (Hazuki and Koguma), MaiHime (Maika and Himeka), The New Eras (Mirai and Ami Sourei), BMI2000 (Natsuko Tora and Ruaka), 02 line (AZM and Miyu Amasaki), Kawild Venus (Mina Shirakawa/Waka Tsukiyama and Saki), and wing★gori (Hanan and Saya Iida). Yuu and Takahashi defeated Utami Hayashishita and Saya Kamitani in the finals.

== Personal life ==
On April 26, 2026, Yuu announced her marriage to a Katsuo.

== Championships and accomplishments ==
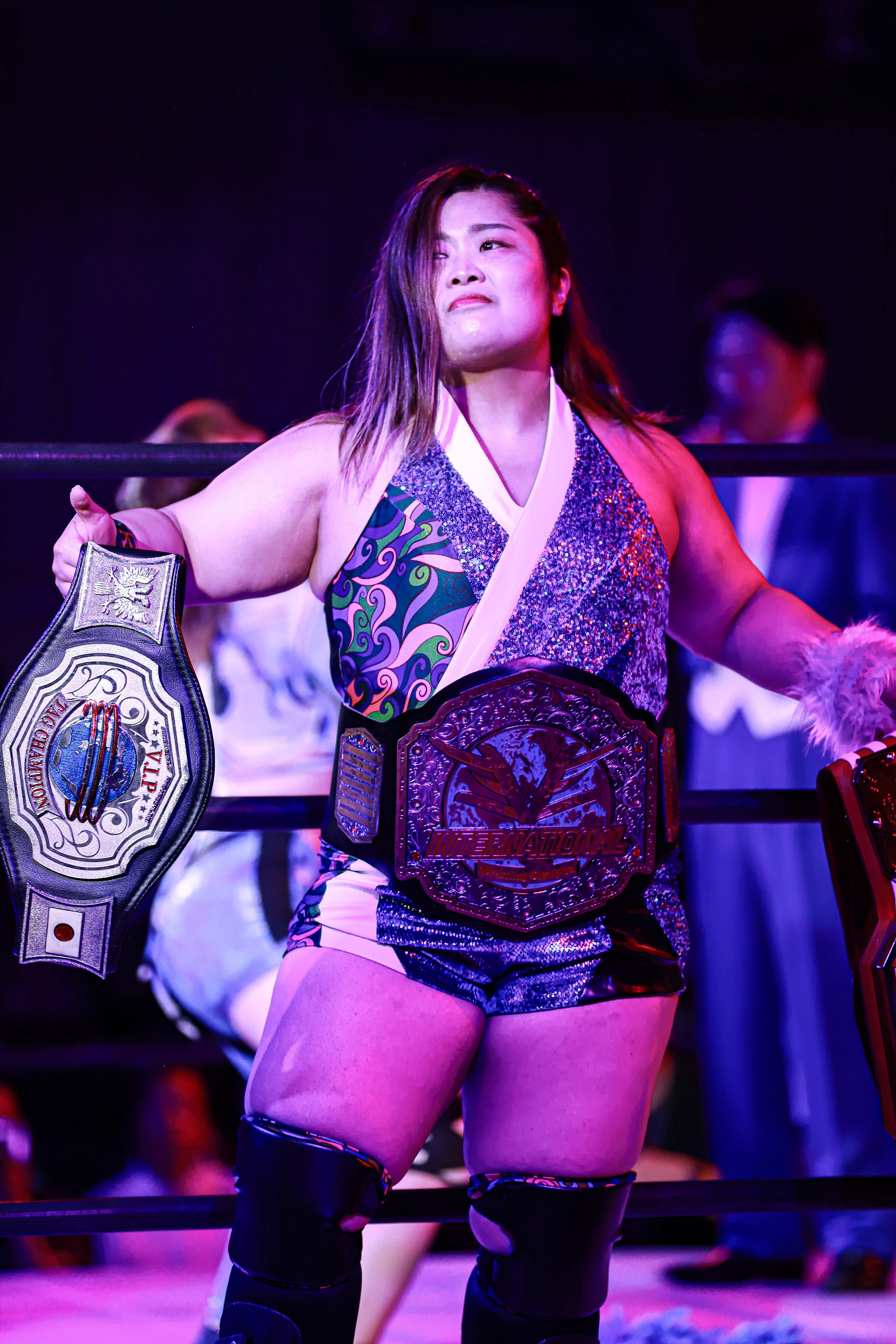
Yuu is a three-time Sendai Girls Tag Team Champion, a Pro-Wrestling: EVE International Champion...

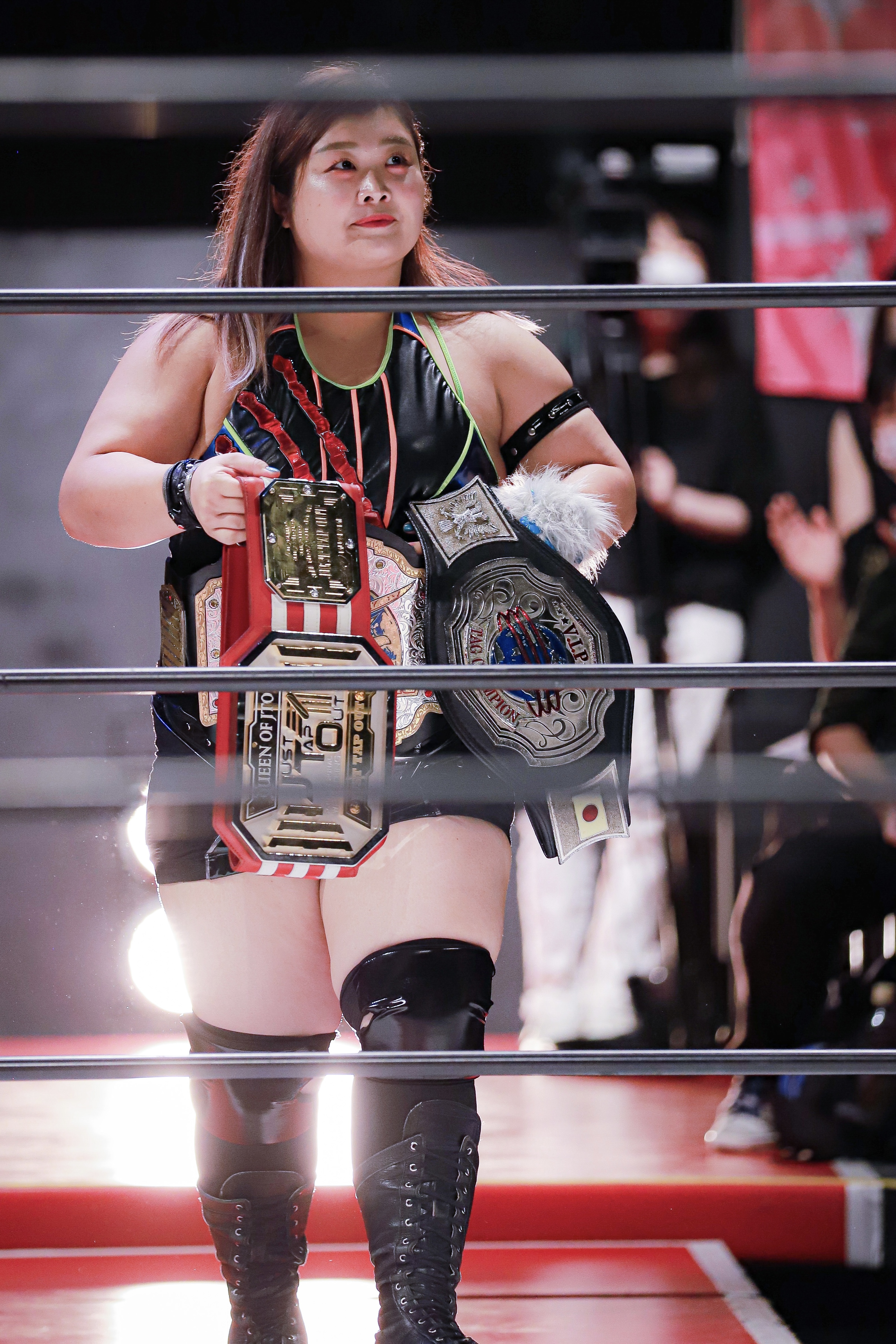
...and a Queen of JTO Champion.

- All Japan Pro Wrestling
  - AJPW TV Six-Man Tag Team Championship (1 time) – with Shuji Ishikawa and Chihiro Hashimoto
- DDT Pro-Wrestling
  - Ironman Heavymetalweight Championship (2 times)
- Marvelous That's Women Pro Wrestling
  - AAAW Tag Team Championship (1 time) – with Chihiro Hashimoto
- Oz Academy
  - Oz Academy Tag Team Championship (2 times) – with Kaori Yoneyama and Chihiro Hashimoto
- Pro-Wrestling: EVE
  - Pro-Wrestling: EVE International Championship (1 time)
- Pro Wrestling Illustrated
  - Ranked No. 35 of the top 250 female singles wrestlers in the PWI Women's 250 in 2023
- Professional Wrestling Just Tap Out
  - Queen of JTO Championship (1 time)
- Pro Wrestling Wave
  - Catch the Wave Award (1 time)
    - Outstanding Performance Award (2019)
- Pure-J
  - Pure-J Openweight Championship (1 time)
- Sendai Girls' Pro Wrestling
  - Sendai Girls Tag Team Championship (5 times) – with Chihiro Hashimoto
- The Wrestling Ireland
  - 24/7 365 Open Challenge Championship (1 time)
- Tokyo Joshi Pro Wrestling
  - Princess of Princess Championship (1 time)
  - Tokyo Princess Cup (2016, 2018)
- World Wonder Ring Stardom
  - Goddesses of Stardom Championship (1 time) – with Nanae Takahashi
  - Goddesses of Stardom Tag League (2022) – with Nanae Takahashi
