= Professional Wrestling Just Tap Out =

Japanese Wrestling training facility

JTO
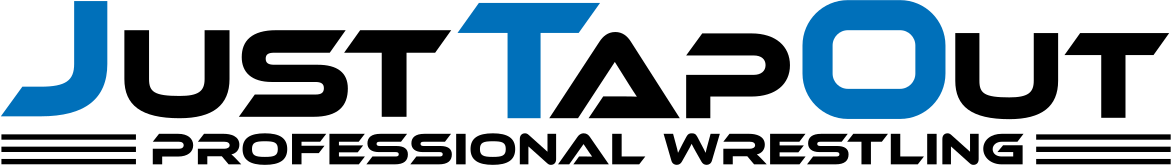
- Founded: 2019
- Style: Puroresu; Submission wrestling
- Headquarters: Tokyo, Japan
- Founder: Taka Michinoku
- Owner: Taka Michinoku
- Split from: Kaientai Dojo
- Website: https://prowrestlingjto.com/

JTO (also known as Professional Wrestling Just Tap Out) is a Japanese professional wrestling promotion and training facility owned by Taka Michinoku. The promotion places an emphasis on a unique style of puroresu that combines high-flying wrestling, technical wrestling and various martial arts. Most matches are held under submission-only rules.

The promotion was founded by Michinoku after his previous promotion, Kaientai Dojo (now Active Advance Pro Wrestling) dismissed him after he was involved in scandal caused by an extramarital affair. JTO held their first show on July 8, 2019 in Korakuen Hall.

Unlike most professional wrestling promotions, their top honor isn't a championship, instead wrestlers who are officially signed to the promotion compete in tournaments and ranking matches under JTO rules, with the top ranking ("King of JTO" for men and "Queen of JTO" for women) considered the highest honor. As of January 2024, those honors are held by Ryuya Takekura and Tomoka Inaba respectively.

The promotion holds partnerships with various other promotions from the Japanese wrestling scene such as World Wonder Ring Stardom (Stardom). Tomoka Inaba and Aoi are two of JTO's wrestlers who appeared in several events promoted by Stardom such as New Blood 1 and New Blood 2.

== Current rankings ==
Wrestlers compete in three separate rankings under JTO rules: the JTO Ranking, the JTO J2 Ranking and the JTO Girls Ranking. The JTO Ranking is the primary ranking for male wrestlers, with the highest ranked wrestler crowned King of JTO. The JTO J2 Ranking is a secondary ranking in which matches are fought under slightly different rules (2 lost points before a TKO instead of 3). The JTO Girls Ranking is the primary ranking for female wrestlers, with the highest ranked wrestler crowned Queen of JTO.

As of January 2024, the rankings are as follows.

JTO Ranking
#	Wrestler
K	Ryuya Takekura
2	Ren Ayabe
3	Akira Jumonji
4	Taka Michinoku
5	Eagle Mask
6	Ibuki
7	Fire Katsumi
8	Genta Yubari
9	Mr. Mask
10	Keita

JTO J2 Ranking
#	Wrestler
1	Arata
2	Masayoshi Miyairi
3	Kensuke
4	Kimo
5	Maxi
6	Vacant
7	Vacant
8	Vacant
9	Vacant
10	Vacant

JTO Girls Ranking
#	Wrestler
Q	Tomoka Inaba
2	Aoi
3	Yuu Yamagata
4	Sumika Yanagawa
5	rhythm
6	Misa Kagura
7	Azusa Inaba
8	Hisoka
9	Vacant
10	Vacant

== Current championships ==
As of November 11, 2026 this is the list of championships created or promoted by the promotion.

=== Men's ===
Championship	Current champion	Reign	Date won	Days held	Location	Notes
King of JTO	Yukimitsu Takahashi	1	August 11, 2026	92+	Saitama, Japan	Defeated Ryuya Takekura to win the vacant title at JTO Special.
JTO Openweight Championship	Naoya Akama	1	August 11, 2026	92+	Saitama, Japan	Defeated Bomber Tatsuya at JTO Special.
JTO Tag Team Championship	Myo-o (Genta Yubari and Takobutsu)	1 (3, 2)	November 9, 2026	2+	Hiroshima, Japan	Defeated Bomber Tatsuya and Ryuya Takekura at JTO West Japan Winter Tour 2026 (day 5).
UWA World Light Heavyweight Championship	Naoya Akama	2	August 11, 2025	457+	Yokohama, Japan	Defeated Bomber Tatsuya at JTO Special.

=== Shared ===
Championship	Current champion	Reign	Date won	Days held	Location	Notes
Independent World Junior Heavyweight Championship	Momoka Hanazono	1	October 10, 2026	32+	Tokyo, Japan	Defeated Megaton in a winner takes all match in which Momoka’s Up Town Championship was also on the line at Marigold Battle Heart 2026.

=== Women's ===
Championship	Current champion	Reign	Date won	Days held	Location	Notes
Queen of JTO	Aoi	3	October 10, 2026	32+	Yokohama, Japan	Defeated Azusa Inaba at JTO.
JTO Girls Championship	Azusa Inaba	2	August 29, 2026	74+	Hokkaido, Japan	Defeated Big Haruka at JTO to win the vacant title.
JTO Girls Tag Team Championship	Tomoka Inaba and Mirai	1 (3, 1)	October 10, 2026	32+	Yokohama, Japan	Defeated Big Fusion (Big Haruka and Jumbo Inoue) at JTO.

=== JTO Openweight Championship ===
JTO Openweight Championship

Details
- Promotion: JTO
- Date established: October 2023
- Current champion: Naoya Akama
- Date won: August 11, 2026
Statistics
- First champion: Ren Ayabe
- Longest reign: Genta Yubari (399 days)
- Shortest reign: Ibuki (92 days)
- Oldest champion: Naoya Akama (35 years, 128 days)
- Youngest champion: Bomber Tatsuya (19 years, 245 days)
- Heaviest champion: Gladio (244 lbs)
- Lightest champion: Naoya Akama (123 lbs)

The JTO Openweight Championship is a professional wrestling championship serving as the secondary title of JTO's male division. There have been a total of six reigns shared between six different wrestlers. The current champion is Naoya Akama who is in his first reign.

Key
No.	Overall reign number
Reign	Reign number for the specific champion
Days	Number of days held
Defenses	Number of successful defenses
<1	Reign lasted less than a day
+	Current reign is changing daily

No.	Champion	Championship change			Reign statistics			Notes	Ref.
No.	Champion	Date	Event	Location	Reign	Days	Defenses	Notes	Ref.
1	Ren Ayabe	November 10, 2023	JTO House	Tokyo, Japan	1	112	2	Defeated Ryuya Takekura in the J1 League final to become the inaugural champion.	
2	Gladio	March 1, 2024	JTO	Tokyo, Japan	1	140	1		
—	Vacated	July 19, 2024	—	—	—	—	—		
3	Genta Yubari	August 31, 2024	JTO	Sendai, Japan	1	399	8	Defeated Fire Katsumi to win the vacant championship.	
4	Ibuki	October 4, 2025	JTO Special	Yokohama, Japan	1	92	2		
5	Bomber Tatsuya	January 4, 2026	JTO First Show Of The Year	Tokyo, Japan	1	219	2		
6	Naoya Akama	August 11, 2026	JTO Special	Saitama, Japan	1	92+	1		

==== Combined reigns ====
As of November 11, 2026.

†	Indicates the current champion

Rank	Wrestler	No. of reigns	Combined defenses	Combined days
1	Genta Yubari	1	8	399
2	Bomber Tatsuya	1	2	219
3	Gladio	1	1	140
4	Ren Ayabe	1	2	112
5	Naoya Akama †	1	1	92+
6	Ibuki	1	2	92

=== JTO Tag Team Championship ===
JTO Tag Team Championship

Details
- Promotion: JTO
- Date established: September 2024
- Current champions: Myo-o (Genta Yubari and Takobutsu)
- Date won: November 9, 2026
Statistics
- First champions: Myo-o (Hiro Iijima and Ryoma Tsukamoto)
- Most reigns: As a team (3 reigns): Myo-o (Ibuki and Miyamasa) As an individual (4 reigns): Miyamasa
- Longest reign: Myo-o (Genta Yubari and Miyamasa) (267 days)
- Shortest reign: Myo-o (Hiro Iijima and Ryoma Tsukamoto) (27 days)
- Oldest champion: Minoru Suzuki (57 years, 24 days)
- Youngest champion: Bomber Tatsuya (19 years, 187 days)
- Heaviest champion: Ryoma Tsukamoto (220 lbs)
- Lightest champion: Naoya Akama (123 lbs)

The JTO Tag Team Championship is a professional wrestling tag team championship serving as the male division's tag titles. There have been a total of twelve reigns shared between ten different teams consisting of fifteen distinctive champions. The current titleholders are Myo-o (Genta Yubari and Takobutsu) who are in their first reign as a team and second reign for Takobutsu and third reign for Genta individually.

Key
No.	Overall reign number
Reign	Reign number for the specific team—reign numbers for the individuals are in parentheses, if different
Days	Number of days held
Defenses	Number of successful defenses
<1	Reign lasted less than a day
+	Current reign is changing daily

No.	Champion	Championship change			Reign statistics			Notes	Ref.
No.	Champion	Date	Event	Location	Reign	Days	Defenses	Notes	Ref.
1	Myo-o (Hiro Iijima and Ryoma Tsukamoto)	October 5, 2024	JTO Tag Championship One Day Tournament	Yokohama, Japan	1	27	0	Defeated Genesis (Akira Jumonji and Fire Katsumi) in a tournament final to become the inaugural champions.	
2	Ill Gravity (Ara and Naoya Akama)	November 1, 2024	JTO	Tokyo, Japan	1	36	0		
3	Myo-o (Ibuki and Miyamasa)	December 7, 2024	JTO West Japan Series 2024	Masuda, Japan	1	34	3		
4	Arata and Carbell Ito	January 10, 2025	JTO Hatsu	Tokyo, Japan	1	115	1	This was a four-way tag team match also involving Ara and Naoya Akama, and Bomber Tatsuya and Thunder Masami.	
5	Myo-o (Ibuki and Miyamasa)	May 5, 2025	JTO House	Yokohama, Japan	2	67	1		
6	Genta Yubari and Minoru Suzuki	July 11, 2025	JTO 6th Anniversary	Tokyo, Japan	1	63	1		
7	Myo-o (Ibuki and Miyamasa)	September 12, 2025	JTO In Hiroshima	Hiroshima, Japan	3	57	0		
8	Bomber Tatsuya and Keita	November 8, 2025	JTO West Japan Tour 2025 (day 3)	Saga, Japan	1	50	0		
9	Myo-o (Genta Yubari and Miyamasa)	December 28, 2025	JTO Final Show Of The Year	Tokyo, Japan	1 (2, 4)	267	1		
10	Kentaro Hachisu and Yumehito Imanari	September 21, 2026	JTO Special	Tokyo, Japan	1	19	0		
11	Bomber Tatsuya and Ryuya Takekura	October 10, 2026	JTO	Yokohama, Japan	1 (2, 1)	30	0		
12	Myo-o (Genta Yubari and Takobutsu (Note: He was known as Keita in his first reign with Bomber Tatsuya))	November 9, 2026	JTO West Japan Winter Tour 2026 (day 5)	Hiroshima, Japan	1 (3, 2)	2+	0		

== Combined reigns ==
As of November 11, 2026.

†	Indicates the current champion

=== By team ===
Rank	Team	No. of reigns	Combined defenses	Combined days
1	Myo-o (Genta Yubari and Miyamasa)	1	1	267
2	Myo-o (Ibuki and Miyamasa)	3	4	158
3	Arata and Carbell Ito	1	1	115
4	Genta Yubari and Minoru Suzuki	1	1	63
5	Bomber Tatsuya and Keita	1	0	50
6	Ill Gravity (Ara and Naoya Akama)	1	0	36
7	Bomber Tatsuya and Ryuya Takekura	1	0	30
8	Myo-o (Hiro Iijima and Ryoma Tsukamoto)	1	0	27
9	Kentaro Hachisu and Yumehito Imanari	1	0	19
10	Myo-o † (Genta Yubari and Takobutsu)	1	0	2+

=== By wrestler ===
Rank	Wrestler	No. of reigns	Combined defenses	Combined days
1	Miyamasa	4	5	425
2	Genta Yubari †	3	2	332+
3	Ibuki	3	4	158
4	Arata	1	1	115
4	Carbell Ito	1	1	115
6	Bomber Tatsuya	2	0	80
7	Minoru Suzuki	1	1	63
8	Keita/Takobutsu †	2	0	52+
9	Ara	1	0	36
9	Naoya Akama	1	0	36
11	Ryuya Takekura	1	0	30
13	Hiro Ijima	1	0	27
13	Ryoma Tsukamoto	1	0	27
15	Kentaro Hachisu	1	0	19
15	Yumehito Imanari	1	0	19

=== JTO Girls Championship ===
JTO Girls Championship
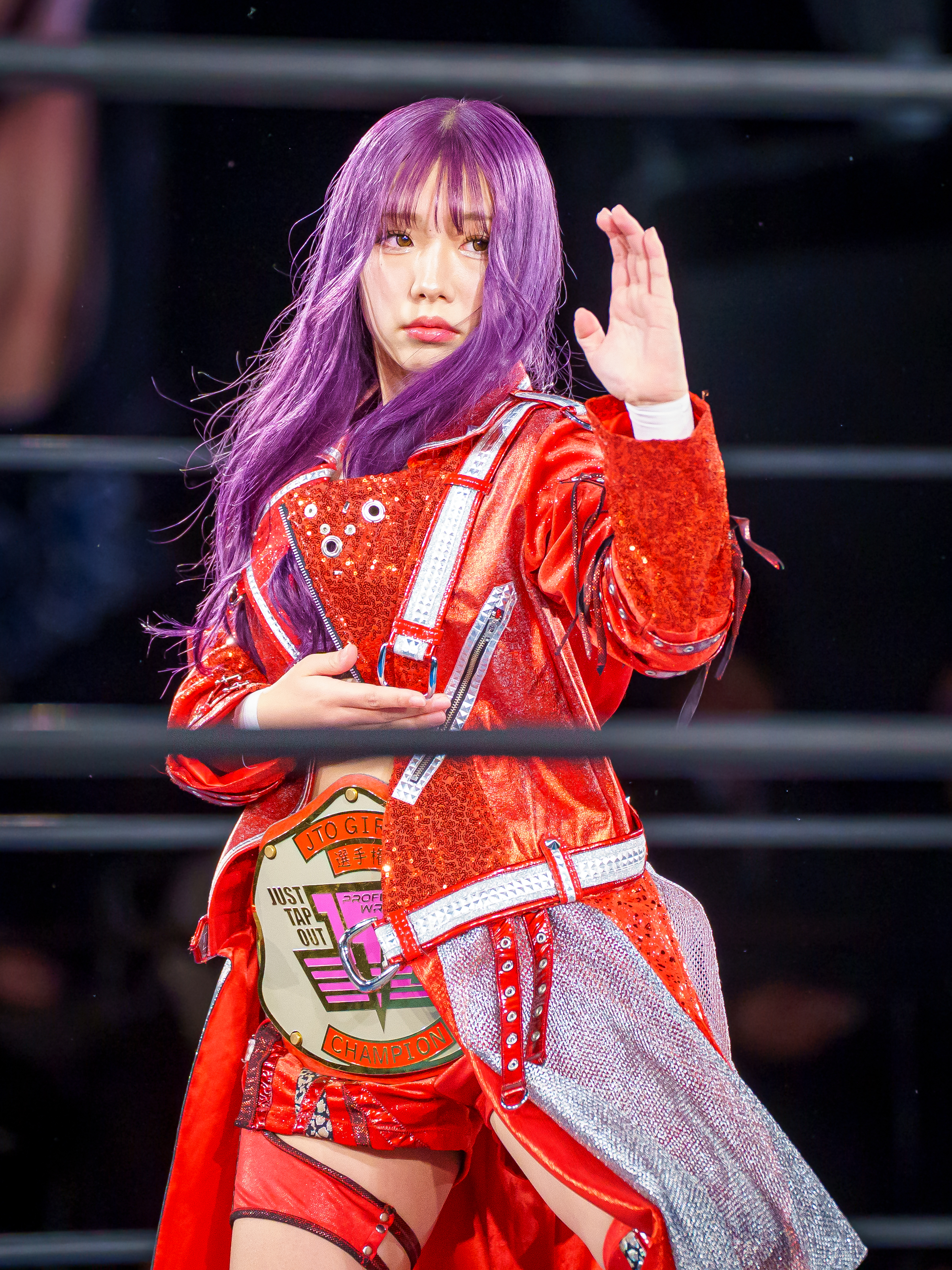
- Azusa Inaba with the current title design in 2025

Details
- Promotion: JTO
- Date established: October 2023
- Current champion: Azusa Inaba
- Date won: August 29, 2026
Statistics
- First champion: Misa Kagura
- Most reigns: 2 reigns: Azusa Inaba
- Longest reign: Azusa Inaba (387 days)
- Shortest reign: Tomoka Inaba (49 days)
- Oldest champion: Yuu Yamagata (48 years, 100 days)
- Youngest champion: Azusa Inaba (17 years, 7 days)
- Heaviest champion: Yuu Yamagata (136 lbs)
- Lightest champion: Azusa Inaba (110 lbs)

The JTO Girls Championship is the secondary accomplishment of JTO. There have been a total of eight reigns shared between seven different champions. The current title holder is Azusa Inaba who is in her second reign.

Key
No.	Overall reign number
Reign	Reign number for the specific champion
Days	Number of days held
Defenses	Number of successful defenses
<1	Reign lasted less than a day
+	Current reign is changing daily

No.	Champion	Championship change			Reign statistics			Notes	Ref.
No.	Champion	Date	Event	Location	Reign	Days	Defenses	Notes	Ref.
1	Misa Kagura	November 10, 2023	JTO J1 League & GIRLS League	Tokyo, Japan	1	57	1	Defeated Sumika Yanagawa in the Girls' League final to become the inaugural champion.	
2	Unagi Sayaka	January 6, 2024	JTO Girls Special	Tokyo, Japan	1	125	2		
3	Aoi	May 10, 2024	JTO Michinoku The Super Best 2024	Tokyo, Japan	1	157	1		
4	Yuu Yamagata	October 14, 2024	JTO Hakodate General Wholesale Center Convention	Tokyo, Japan	1	53	1		
5	Azusa Inaba	December 6, 2024	JTO	Nagoya, Japan	1	387	6		
6	Mirai	December 28, 2025	JTO Final Show Of The Year	Nagoya, Japan	1	194	5		
7	Tomoka Inaba	July 10, 2026	JTO 7th Anniversary	Tokyo, Japan	1	49	1		
—	Vacated	August 28, 2026	—	—	—	—	—		
8	Azusa Inaba	August 29, 2026	JTO	Hokkaido, Japan	2	74+	1	Defeated Big Haruka to win the vacant title	

==== Combined reigns ====
As of November 11, 2026.

†	Indicates the current champion

Rank	Wrestler	No. of reigns	Combined defenses	Combined days
1	Azusa Inaba †	2	7	461+
2	Mirai	1	5	194
3	Aoi	1	1	157
4	Unagi Sayaka	1	2	125
5	Misa Kagura	1	1	57
6	Yuu Yamagata	1	0	53
7	Tomoka Inaba	1	1	49

=== JTO Girls Tag Team Championship ===
JTO Girls Tag Team Championship

Details
- Promotion: JTO
- Date established: September 2024
- Current champions: Tomoka Inaba and Mirai
- Date won: October 10, 2026
Statistics
- First champions: Aoi and Tomoka Inaba
- Most reigns: As tag team (3 reigns): 1111 (Misa Kagura and Sumika Yanagawa); As individual (3 reigns): Aoi; Misa Kagura; Sumika Yanagawa; Tomoka Inaba
- Longest reign: Tomoka Inaba and Rhythm (188 days)
- Shortest reign: Akane Fujita and Rhythm (10 days)
- Oldest champion: Jumbo Inoue (39 years, 155 days)
- Youngest champion: Azusa Inaba (17 years, 5 months and 6 days)
- Heaviest champion: Big Haruka (147 lbs)
- Lightest champion: Sumika Yanagawa and HisokA (110 lbs)

The JTO Girls Tag Team Championship is a professional wrestling tag team championship serving as the female division's tag titles. There have been a total of nine reigns shared between eight different teams consisting of eleven distinctive champions. The current champions are Tomoka Inaba and Mirai, who are in their first reign as a team and third reign for Tomoka and first reign for Mirai individually.

Key
No.	Overall reign number
Reign	Reign number for the specific team—reign numbers for the individuals are in parentheses, if different
Days	Number of days held
Defenses	Number of successful defenses
<1	Reign lasted less than a day
+	Current reign is changing daily

No.	Champion	Championship change			Reign statistics			Notes	Ref.
No.	Champion	Date	Event	Location	Reign	Days	Defenses	Notes	Ref.
1	Aoi and Tomoka Inaba	October 5, 2024	JTO Tag Championship One Day Tournament	Yokohama, Japan	1	140	2	Defeated Misa Kagura and Yuuri in a tournament final to become the inaugural champions.	
2	1111 (Misa Kagura and Sumika Yanagawa)	February 22, 2025	JTO Special In Itabashi	Tokyo, Japan	1	62	0		
3	Akane Fujita and Rhythm	April 25, 2025	JTO Bell Epoque	Tokyo, Japan	1	10	0		
4	Aoi and Azusa Inaba	May 5, 2025	JTO Girls	Tokyo, Japan	1 (2, 1)	48	0		
5	1111 (Misa Kagura and Sumika Yanagawa)	June 22, 2025	JTO	Tokyo, Japan	2	50	1		
6	Tomoka Inaba and Rhythm	August 11, 2025	JTO Special	Yokohama, Japan	1 (2, 2)	188	6		
7	Big Fusion (Aoi and HisokA)	February 15, 2026	JTO	Saitama, Japan	1 (3, 1)	49	0		
8	1111 (Misa Kagura and Sumika Yanagawa)	April 5, 2026	JTO Special	Tokyo, Japan	3	96	0		
9	Big Fusion (Big Haruka and Jumbo Inoue)	July 10, 2026	JTO 7th Anniversary	Tokyo, Japan	1	92	1		
10	Tomoka Inaba and Mirai	October 10, 2026	JTO	Yokohama, Japan	1 (3, 1)	32+	1		

== Combined reigns ==
As of November 11, 2026.

†	Indicates the current champion

=== By team ===
Rank	Team	No. of reigns	Combined defenses	Combined days
1	1111 (Misa Kagura and Sumika Yanagawa)	3	1	208
2	Tomoka Inaba and Rhythm	1	6	188
3	Aoi and Tomoka Inaba	1	2	140
4	Big Fusion (Big Haruka and Jumbo Inoue)	1	1	92
5	Big Fusion (Aoi and HisokA)	1	0	49
6	Aoi and Azusa Inaba	1	0	48
7	Tomoka Inaba and Mirai †	1	1	32+
8	Akane Fujita and Rhythm	1	0	10

=== By wrestler ===
Rank	Wrestler	No. of reigns	Combined defenses	Combined days
1	Tomoka Inaba †	3	9	360+
2	Aoi	3	2	237
3	Misa Kagura	3	1	208
3	Sumika Yanagawa	3	1	208
5	Rhythm	2	6	198
6	Big Haruka	1	1	94
6	Jumbo Inoue	1	1	94
8	HisokA	1	0	49
9	Azusa Inaba	1	0	48
10	Mirai †	1	1	32+
11	Akane Fujita	1	0	10

== Tournaments ==
Name	Winner	Date held	Stipulation
Only Give Up Tournament	Taka Michinoku	February 12 - August 14, 2020	Submission-only tournament to decide the first #1 and #2 ranked male wrestlers
JTO Girls Tournament	Aki Shizuku	December 6, 2020	Tournament to decide the first #1 and #2 female wrestlers
JTO Tournament 2021	Kanon	February 27 - March 19, 2020	Winner received a match against the King of JTO

== Accomplishments ==
=== Triple Crown Champions (Women) ===
In Just Tap Out (JTO), the Triple Crown consists of the top three titles promoted by the company. They are the Queen of JTO Championship, the JTO Girls Championship, and the JTO Girls Tag Team Championship. On October 5, 2024, during the JTO Tag Championship One Day Tournament, Aoi became the first Triple Crown Champion in JTO's history.

Text
Dates in **bold**	The date the wrestler completed the Triple Crown

Champion	Primary championship	Secondary championship	Tag team championship
Champion	Queen of JTO Championship	JTO Girls Championship	JTO Girls Tag Team Championship
Aoi	November 10, 2023	May 10, 2024	**October 5, 2024** (with Tomoka Inaba)
Azusa Inaba	**July 11, 2025**	December 6, 2024	May 5, 2025 (with Aoi)
Tomoka Inaba	July 7, 2021	**July 10, 2026**	October 5, 2024 (with Aoi)

=== Triple Crown Champions ===
In Just Tap Out (JTO), the Triple Crown consists of the three top titles promoted by the company. They are the King of JTO Championship, the JTO Openweight Championship, and the JTO Tag Team Championship. On March 3, 2026, during a JTO event, Ibuki became the first (men) and third overall Triple Crown Champion in JTO’s history.

Text
Dates in **bold**	The date the wrestler completed the Triple Crown

Champion	Primary championship	Secondary championship	Tag team championship
Champion	King of JTO Championship	JTO Openweight Championship	JTO Tag Team Championship
Ibuki	**March 6, 2026**	October 4, 2025	December 7, 2024 (with Miyamasa)
