= Yappy (wrestler) =

Filipino professional wrestler

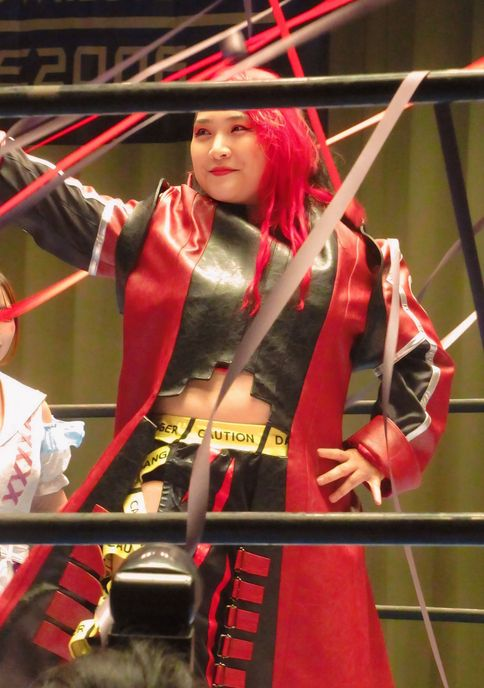
- Yappy in August 2024

Personal information
- Born: 26 February 1980 (age 46)

Professional wrestling career
- Ring name: Yappy
- Billed height: 157 cm (5 ft 2 in)
- Billed weight: 75 kg (165 lb)
- Trained by: Mio Shirai; Misaki Ohata
- Debut: 2019

Yapi Santiago (ヤッピ サンティアゴ, Santiago Yapi) better known mononymously by her ring name Yappy (ヤッピ, Yapi) is a Filipino professional wrestler signed to Ice Ribbon where she a former International Ribbon Tag Team Champion. She is also known for her work in various promotions from the Japanese independent scene such as Pro Wrestling Wave and World Woman Pro-Wrestling Diana.

== Professional wrestling career ==
=== Ice Ribbon (2019–present) ===
Yappy made her professional wrestling debut in Ice Ribbon at Ice Ribbon P's Party #27 ~ Yokohama Party on May 2, 2019, where she teamed up with Rina Yamashita in a losing effort against Burning Raw (Giulia and Tequila Saya).

During her tenure with the promotion, she chased for various accomplishments. At Ice Ribbon #1040 on May 9, 2020, Yappy competed in tournament for the IW19 Championship in which she fell short to Suzu Suzuki. At Ice Ribbon #1268 on March 25, 2023, she competed in a gauntlet match in which Nao Ishikawa went into a draw against Yappy herself and many other notable opponents such as Chie Ozora, Banny Oikawa, Asahi, Ibuki Hoshi, Momo Tani, Kaho Matsushita, Mio Shirai, Kyuri, Tsuki Umino and Yura Suzuki. At Ice Ribbon #1284 at June 18, 2023, she unsuccessfully challenged Satsuki Totoro for the ICE Cross Infinity Championship. At Ice Ribbon #1297 on August 26, 2023, she teamed up with Akari and unsuccessfully competed in a three-way tag team match for the International Ribbon Tag Team Championship in which reigning champions Mukomako (Hamuko Hoshi and Makoto) dropped the titles to Misa Kagura and Sumika Yanagawa. Yappy succeeded in winning the tag titles alongside Ancham at Ice Ribbon #1422 on May 25, 2025, by defeating Cheerful Princess (Arisa Shinose and Misa Kagura).

==== Pro Wrestling Wave (2020–2022) ====
Another promotion in which Yappy often competed is Pro Wrestling Wave. She made her first appearance in the Catch the Wave tournament in the Young Block of the 2021 edition where she scored a total of three points in the B block after going against Chie Ozora, Sumika Yanagawa and Waka Tsukiyama. At WAVE NAMI 1, an event promoted on December 1, 2021, Yappy unsuccessfully competed for the World Woman Pro-Wrestling Diana Queen Elizabeth Championship in a three-way bout in which reigning champion Yumi Ohka dropped the title to Kaori Yoneyama.

=== Japanese independent circuit (2019–present) ===
Yappy often competes for various promotions as a developmental talent sent by Ice Ribbon. At Gleat G PROWRESTLING Ver. 28 on June 19, 2022, she teamed up with Ami Kanda in a losing effort against Hamuko Hoshi and Michiko Miyagi.

== Championships and accomplishments ==
- Ice Ribbon
  - International Ribbon Tag Team Championship (1 time) – with Ancham
