= Chie Ozora =

Japanese professional wrestler

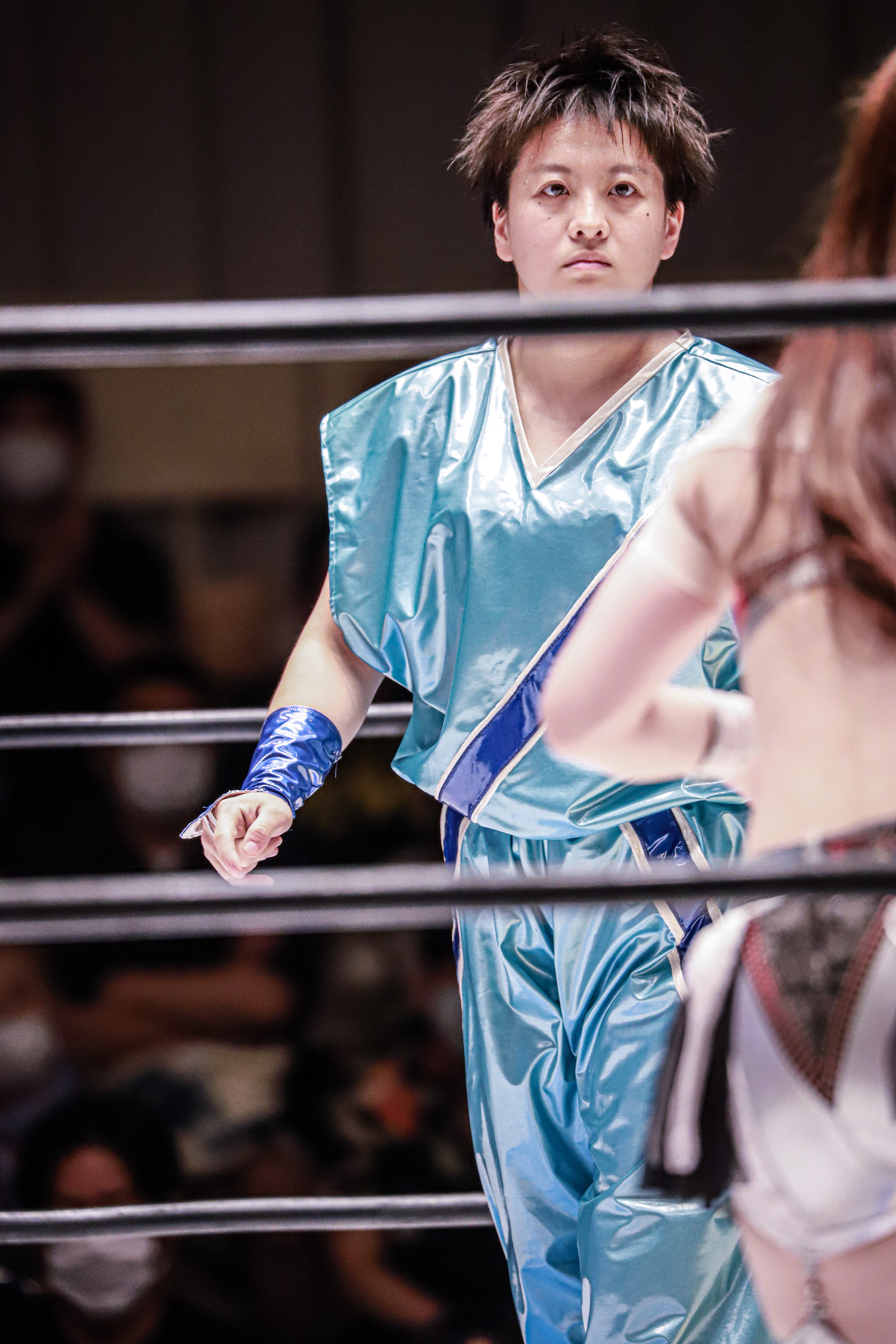
- Ozora in July 2022

Personal information
- Born: November 11, 1993 (age 32) Ebetsu, Japan

Professional wrestling career
- Ring name(s): Chiemi Shioya; Chie Ozora
- Billed height: 154 cm (5 ft 1 in)
- Billed weight: 65 kg (143 lb)
- Trained by: Leon
- Debut: 2020

Chiemi Shioya (塩谷 千愛美, Shioya Chiemi) better known by her ring name Chie Ozora (大空 ちえ, Ōzora Chie) is a Japanese professional wrestler currently performing in the Japanese promotion Pure-J.

== Professional wrestling career ==
=== Independent scene (2020–present) ===
Due to partially working as a freelancer, Shioya competed in several companies of the Japanese independent scene. At Sendai Girls Burning UP on September 20, 2021, she teamed up with Yuu in a losing effort against Hiroyo Matsumoto and Yurika Oka. At Seadlinnng Festival on November 20, 2022, she competed in a battle royal won by Riko Kaiju and also involving Amazon, Choun Shiryu, Hanako Nakamori, Kaho Kobayashi, Makoto, Riko Kawahata, Tae Honma and Yuna Manase. At a house show promoted by World Woman Pro-Wrestling Diana on March 12, 2023, Shioya teamed up with Hanako Nakamori to defeat Ayako Sato and Nanami. At ZERO1 Hitoyoshi Torrential Rain Disaster Charity Show, an event promoted by Pro Wrestling Zero1 on March 18, 2023, she teamed up with Hanako Nakamori to defeat Ayame Sasamura and Himiko.

=== Pure-J (2020–present) ===
Shioya made her professional wrestling debut in Pure-J at a house show promoted on July 5, 2020, where she went into a time-limit draw against Command Bolshoi in an exhibition match. During her tenure with the company, she chased for various championships promoted by it. At PURE-J Climax 2020 on December 13, she teamed up with Makoto to unsuccessfully challenge Hanako Nakamori and Rina Yamashita for the Daily Sports Women's Tag Team Championship. At YMZ Gokigen Spring Battle 2021 Mini on March 21, she unsuccessfully challenged Kaori Yoneyama for the Pure-J Openweight Championship. She won her first title, the Princess of Pro-Wrestling Championship at Pure-J Maniax 2023 on April 16, by defeating Riko Kaiju.

==== Ice Ribbon (2020–present) ====
Due to Pure-J holding business partnerships with Ice Ribbon, Shioya regularly competes in various of the latter promotion's events. She started in the "P's Party" branch of events on November 25, 2020, where she fell short to Madeline in singles competition. She started competing more often beginning with 2022, implying herself in various match gimmicks and notable events. At Ice Ribbon New Ice Ribbon #1248 In Narimasu on December 24, 2022, she teamed up with rookies Kiku and Saran in a losing effort against Rebel X Enemy (Maika Ozaki, Maya Yukihi and Ram Kaicho) as a result of a six-woman tag team match. At Ice Ribbon New Ice Ribbon #1268 on March 25, 2023, she competed in a gauntlet match in which Nao Ishikawa went into a draw against Shioya herself and many other notable opponents such as Arisa Shinose, Asahi, Banny Oikawa, Ibuki Hoshi, Kaho Matsushita, Mio Shirai, Misa Kagura), Momo Tani, Kyuri Satsuki Totoro, Tsuki Umino and Yura Suzuki.

=== Pro Wrestling Wave (2020–present) ===
Another promotion in which Shioya frequently activates is Pro Wrestling Wave. She made her debut in the promotion at WAVE Kabuki-cho Week Ender on October 24, 2020, where she fell short to Misa Matsui in singles competition. She moved to the championship scene at WAVE Survival Dance ~ Regina Challenge where se came out unsuccessfully in a contendership battle royal for the Wave Single Championship won by Yuki Miyazaki and also involving many other notable opponents such as Ayame Sasamura, Hibiscus Mii, Kaori Yoneyama, Miyako Matsumoto, Sakura Hirota, Rina Amikura, Yuko Sakurai and many others.

Shioya is known for competing in one of the promotion's signature events, the Catch the Wave tournament in which she made her first appearance at the 2021 edition, competing in the "Young Block Oh! Oh!" division. She placed herself in the block B which she topped with a total of four points obtained after going against Waka Tsukiyama, Sumika Yanagawa and Yappy. She then moved to the finals where she fell short to Tomoka Inaba. At the 2022 edition, she competed in the big tournament, placing herself in the "Future Block" where she scored a total of two points after going against Suzu Suzuki, Haruka Umesaki, Kohaku and Riko Kawahata.

== Championships and accomplishments ==
- Hokuto Pro Wrestling
  - Battle Royal (2025)
- Pure-J
  - Daily Sports Women's Tag Team Championship (1 time, current) – with Misa Kagura
  - Princess of Pro-Wrestling Championship (3 times)
