= Mifu Ashida =

Japanese professional wrestler

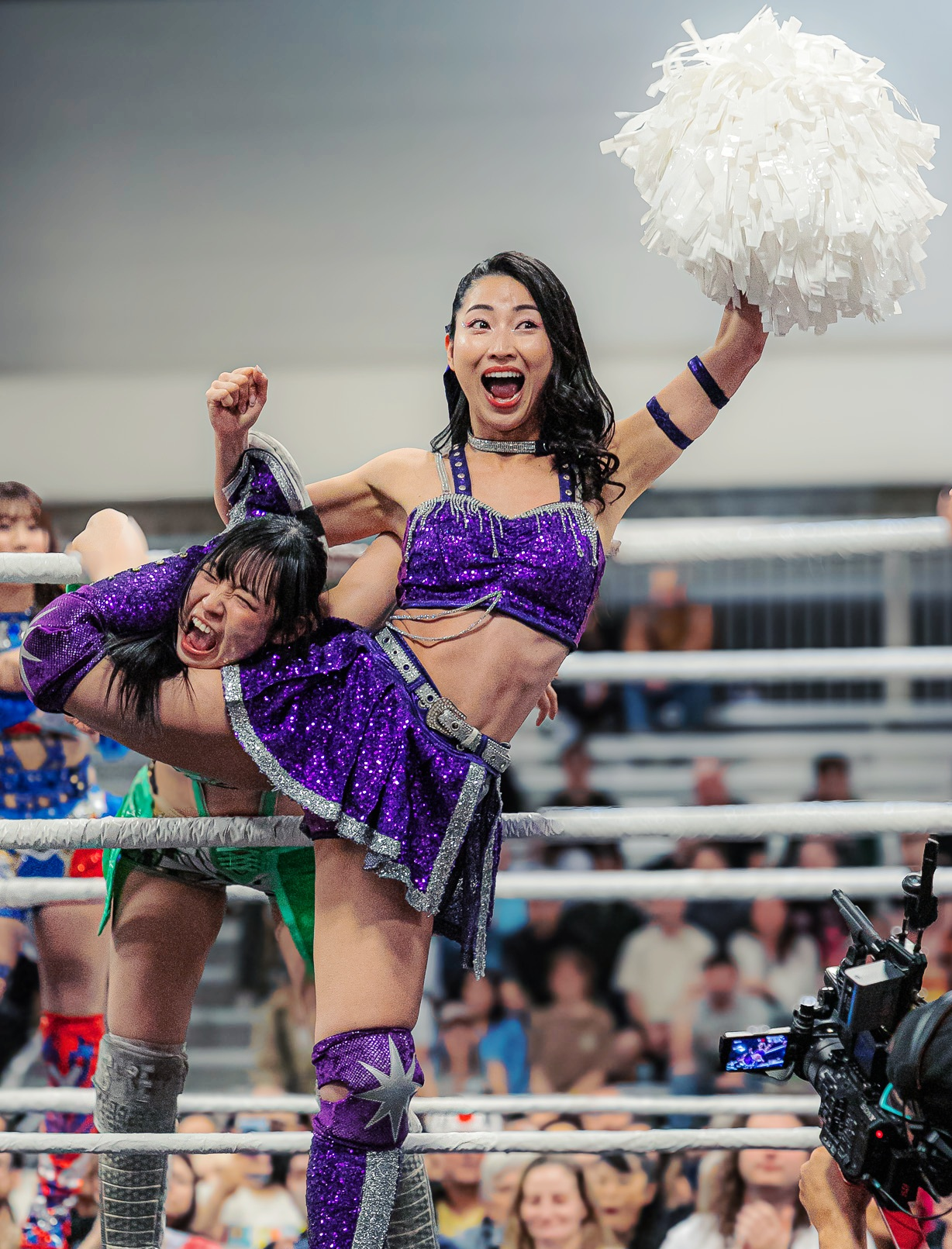
- Ashida (in purple) placing her opponent in a submission hold in March 2026

Personal information
- Born: 2 August 1997 (age 29) Kyoto, Japan

Professional wrestling career
- Ring name: Mifu Ashida
- Billed height: 162 cm (5 ft 4 in)
- Billed weight: 50 kg (110 lb)
- Trained by: Mio Shirai; Ikuto Hidaka; Kaho Matsushita
- Debut: 2023

Mifu Ashida (芦田美歩, Ashida Mifu) is a Japanese professional wrestler currently signed to the Japanese promotion Tokyo Joshi Pro-Wrestling. She is previously known for her tenure with Ice Ribbon where she is a former International Ribbon Tag Team Champion.

== Professional wrestling career ==
=== Ice Ribbon (2023–2024) ===
Ashida made her professional wrestling debut in Ice Ribbon at Ice Ribbon New Ice Ribbon #1297 ~ Ice In Wonderland 2023 on August 26, where she teamed up with Satsuki Totoro to defeat Asuka Fujitaki and Kyuri in tag team competition.

During her tenure with the promotion, Ashida started chasing for various championships owned by it. She won a number one contendership tournament for the ICE Cross Infinity Championship by defeating Asuka Fujitaki in the foirst rounds, Saran in the semifinals and Kyuri in the finals from October 9, 2023, disputed at Ice Ribbon New Ice Ribbon #1306 ~ Yokohama Ribbon 2023 October. Ashida unsuccessfully challenged Ibuki Hoshi for the championship at Ice Ribbon #1311 In Tokyo Dome City on November 3, 2023. At RibbonMania 2023 on December 31, Ashida won her first championship in the promotion, the International Ribbon Tag Team Championship by teaming up with her "Cheerful" tag team partner Kyuri and defeating Queen Valkyrie (Ancham and Yuuri). Ashida and Kyuri dropped the titles at Ice Ribbon March 2024 on March 23 to Big Dekai (Totoro Satsuki and Yuna Manase).

=== Tokyo Joshi Pro-Wrestling (2025–present) ===
Ashida was announced as signed with Tokyo Joshi Pro-Wrestling on January 1, 2025.

In the 2025 "Futari wa Princess" Max Heart Tournament, Ashida was paired with Chika Nanase, but her team was defeated in the first round by eventual winners Shoko Nakajima and Hyper Misao. She failed to qualify for the 2025 Tokyo Princess Cup after being defeated by Himawari. Ashida competed for a title for the first time in TJPW on July 8, 2025, where she was involved in Yoshiko Hasegawa's retirement match, which was also contested for Hasegawa's Ironman Heavymetalweight Championship.

For the 2026 Max Heart Tournament, Ashida teamed up with Yuki Arai and made it to the second round; for the second year in a row, her team was defeated by the eventual winners, in this case the reigning Princess Tag Team Champions, Yuki Kamifuku and Wakana Uehara. In the 2026 Tokyo Princess Cup, Ashida was defeated in the first round by Wakana Uehara. Later that month, she won her first singles championship, briefly winning the Ironman Heavymetalweight Championship twice over two days as part of TJPW's Tokyo Idol Festival shows.

== Championships and accomplishments ==
- DDT Pro-Wrestling
  - Ironman Heavymetalweight Championship (2 times)
- Ice Ribbon
  - International Ribbon Tag Team Championship (1 time) – with Kyuri
