= Arisa Shinose =

Japanese professional wrestler

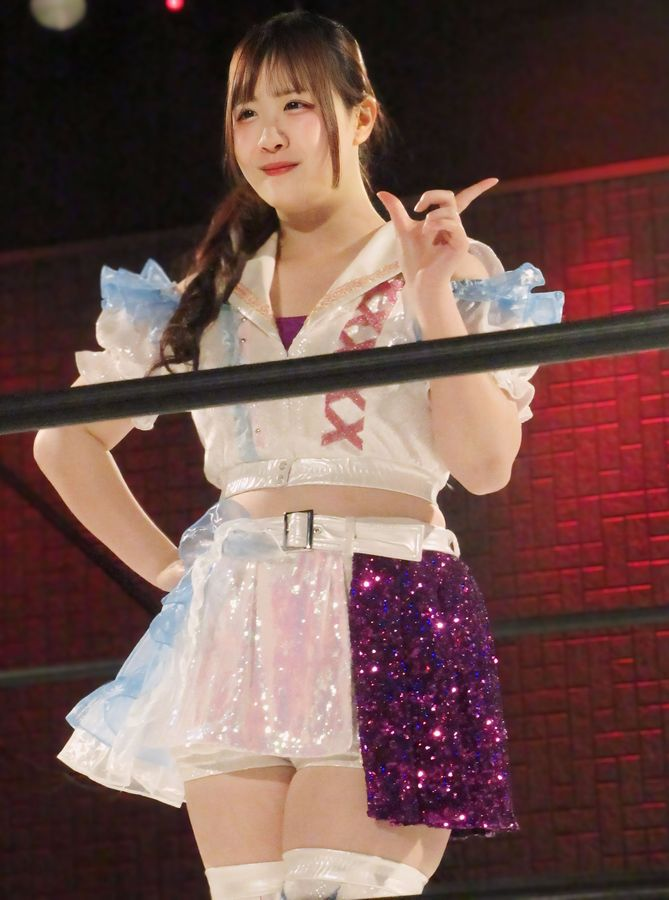
- Shinose in March 2024

Personal information
- Born: 21 January 2005 (age 21) Tokyo, Japan
- Family: Mitoshichi Shinose (father)

Professional wrestling career
- Ring name: Arisa Shinose
- Billed height: 157 cm (5 ft 2 in)
- Billed weight: 55 kg (121 lb)
- Trained by: Mio Shirai
- Debut: 2022

Arisa Shinose (しのせ愛梨紗, Shinose Arisa) is a Japanese professional wrestler signed to Asuka Pro Wrestling. She is best known for her tenure with Ice Ribbon where she is a former International Ribbon Tag Team Champion and for other stint tenures with promotions from the Japanese independent scene.

== Professional wrestling career ==
=== Ice Ribbon (2022–present) ===
Shinose made her professional wrestling debut in Ice Ribbon at New Ice Ribbon #1205 on June 4, 2022, where she fell short to Asahi in an exhibition match.

At Ice Ribbon #1268 on March 25, 2023, Shinose competed in a gauntlet match in which Nao Ishikawa went into a draw against Shinose herself and many other notable opponents such as Chie Ozora, Banny Oikawa, Ibuki Hoshi, Momo Tani, Kaho Matsushita, Mio Shirai, Tsuki Umino and Yura Suzuki.

During her time in the promotion, Shinose chased for various accomplishments. At Yokohama Ribbon 2024 GW I on May 3, she wrestled her first match from a League to crown a new ICE Cross Infinity Champion in which she placed herself in the A block where she scored one point after going against Misa Kagura, Hamuko Hoshi, Kyuri and Tsukasa Fujimoto. At New Ice Ribbon #1400 on February 11, 2025, she unsuccessfully competed in a three-way bout for the Triangle Ribbon Championship in which Kaori Yoneyama came out victorious. At Ice Ribbon New Ice Ribbon #1416 on April 27, 2025, she teamed up with "Cheerful Princess" tag team partner Misa Kagura and defeated KiraMiku (Kirari Wakana and Miku Kanae) to win the International Ribbon Tag Team Championship which represented the first title of Shinose's career.

=== Japanese independent circuit (2023–present) ===
Shinose often competes for various promotions as a developmental talent sent by Ice Ribbon. At WAVE Detras De Lazona Vol. 13, an event promoted by Pro Wrestling Wave on September 18, 2023, Shinose competed twice, first by wrestling Kizuna Tanaka into a time-limit draw, thenby teaming up with Ai Houzan and Honoka to defeat Kizuna Tanaka, Nanami and Yuzuki.

== Personal life ==
Shinose's father is former professional wrestler Mitoshichi Shinose also known as "Akira" Shinose, former SMASH and WNC jobber who later founded Asuka Pro Wrestling.

== Championships and accomplishments ==
- Ice Ribbon
  - International Ribbon Tag Team Championship (1 time) – with Misa Kagura
