= Misa Kagura =

Japanese professional wrestler

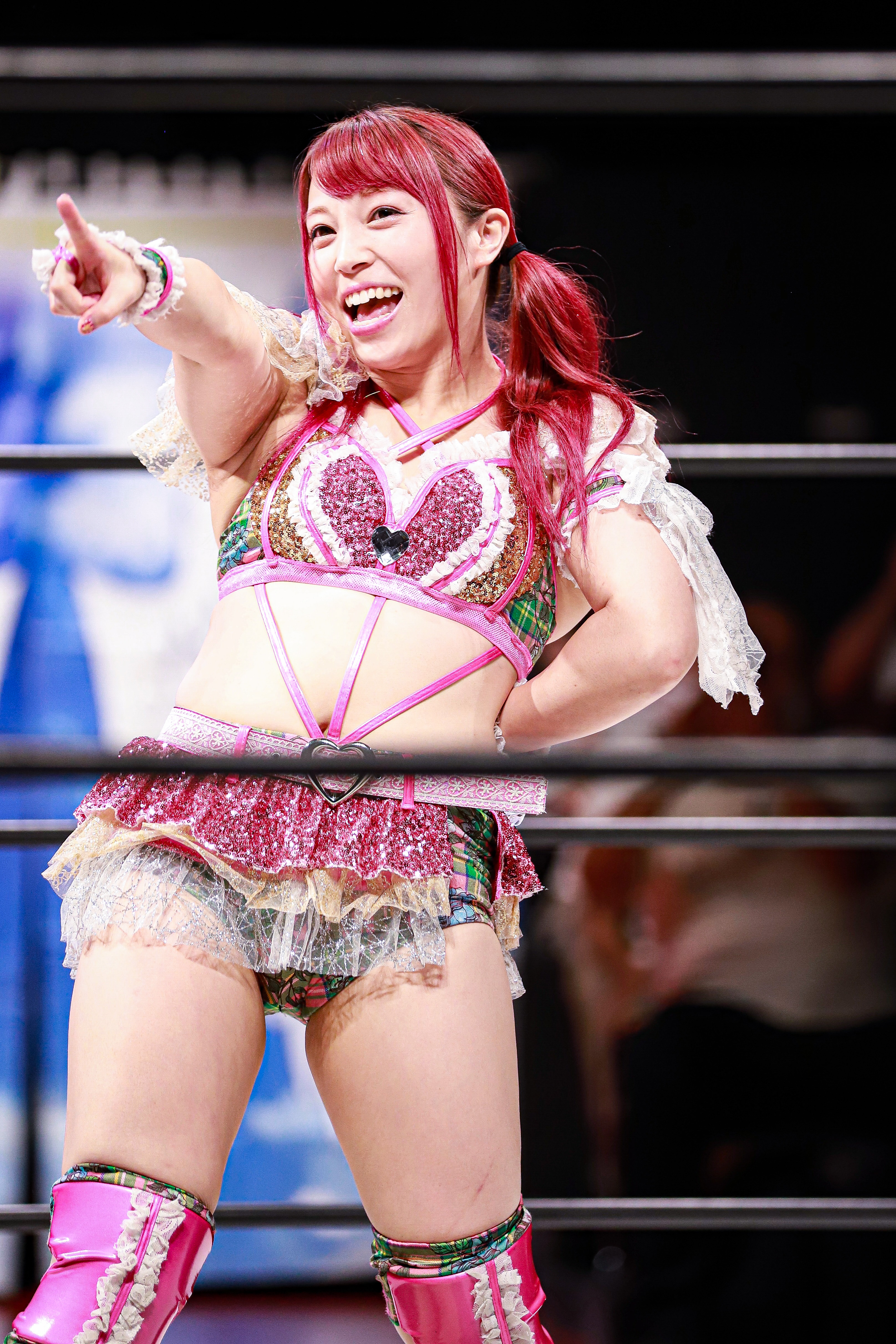
- Kagura in July 2023

Personal information
- Born: Miu Sakamaki; September 24 Morioka, Iwate, Japan

Professional wrestling career
- Ring name(s): Misa Shinki-Raikyo; Misa Kagura
- Billed height: 153 cm (5 ft 0 in)
- Billed weight: 53 kg (117 lb)
- Trained by: Taka Michinoku
- Debut: 2020

Miu Sakamaki (坂巻美雨, Sakamaki Miu), under the ring name Misa Kagura (神姫楽ミサ, Kagura Misa) is a Japanese idol and professional wrestler currently signed to the Japanese promotion Professional Wrestling Just Tap Out, where is a former one-time and inaugural JTO Girls Champion. She is a former member of the idol group Katamomi Joshi and is also known for her time in Ice Ribbon, where she is a former three-time International Ribbon Tag Team Champion.

== Professional wrestling career ==
=== Independent scene (2019–present) ===
Due to partially working as a freelancer, Kagura competed in several companies of the Japanese independent scene. At Stardom New Blood 3, an event promoted by World Wonder Ring Stardom on July 8, 2022, she teamed up with Aoi and Tomoka Inaba in a losing effort against Stars (Hanan, Momo Kohgo and Saya Iida). At WAVE Survival Dance ~ Regina Challenge, an event promoted by Pro Wrestling Wave on October 24, 2022, she competed in a battle royal to determine the number one contender for the Wave Single Championship won by Yuki Miyazaki and also involving notable opponents such as Akane Fujita, Haruka Umesaki, Kakeru Sekiguchi, Kohaku, Miyako Matsumoto, Rina Amikura, Risa Sera, Suzu Suzuki, Yuko Sakurai and many others. At PURE-J PURE-PLUM GanbaRay Memorial 2023, an event promoted by Pure-J on August 17, 2023, Kagura teamed up with Momo Tani and Hanako Nakamori to defeat Akari, Cherry and Crea.

=== Ice Ribbon (2022–present) ===
Kagura is also known for her time in Ice Ribbon where she made her first appearance at New Ice Ribbon #1170 on January 8, 2022, where she teamed up with Asahi in a losing effort against Nao Ishikawa and Tsukushi Haruka. During her time in the promotion, she chased for various championships promoted by it. At Ice Ribbon New Ice Ribbon #1204 on May 28, 2022, she fell short to Ibuki Hoshi in a first round match of a tournament held for the vacant ICE Cross Infinity Championship. At New Ice Ribbon #1297 ~ Ice In Wonderland 2023 on August 26, Kagura teamed up with Sumika Yanagawa to defeat Mukomako (Hamuko Hoshi and Makoto) to win the International Ribbon Tag Team Championship. Kagura also competed in various kinds of match gimmicks. At Ice Ribbon New Ice Ribbon #1268 on March 25, 2023, she competed in a gauntlet match in which Nao Ishikawa went into a draw against Kagura herself and many other notable opponents such as Arisa Shinose, Asahi, Banny Oikawa, Kaho Matsushita, Mio Shirai, Chie Ozora, Momo Tani, Kyuri Satsuki Totoro, Tsuki Umino and Yura Suzuki.

=== Professional Wrestling Just Tap Out (2020–present) ===
Kagura made her professional wrestling debut in Professional Wrestling Just Tap Out (JTO) at JTO Ran, a house show promoted on November 11, 2020, where she teamed up with Aki Shizuku and rhythm in a losing effort against JKO (Black Changita, Black R and BM) as a result of a six-woman tag team match. She took part in the 2023 edition of the JTO Girls Tournament, where she fell short to Yuu in the first rounds.

=== Seadlinnng (2022–present) ===
Another promotion in which Kagura is known for competing is Seadlinnng. At SEAdLINNNG Shin-Kiba Series 2023 Vol. 2 on March 20, 2023, Kagura unsuccessfully challenged Riko Kaiju for the Princess of Pro-Wrestling Championship. At Seadlinnng's 8th Anniversary show from August 25, 2023, she teamed up with Itsuki Aoki and Mio Momono in a losing effort against Las Fresa de Egoistas (Asuka, Makoto and Mima Shimoda).

== Championships and accomplishments ==
- Ice Ribbon
  - International Ribbon Tag Team Championship (3 times) – with Sumika Yanagawa (1), Arisa Shinose (1) and Manami Katsu (1)
- Professional Wrestling Just Tap Out
  - JTO Girls Championship (1 time, inaugural)
  - JTO Girls Tag Team Championship (3 times) – with Sumika Yanagawa
  - UWA World Middleweight Championship (1 time)
- Pure-J
  - Princess of Pro-Wrestling Championship (1 time)
  - Daily Sports Women's Tag Team Championship (1 time, current) – with Chie Ozora
