= Yuuri (wrestler) =

Japanese professional wrestler

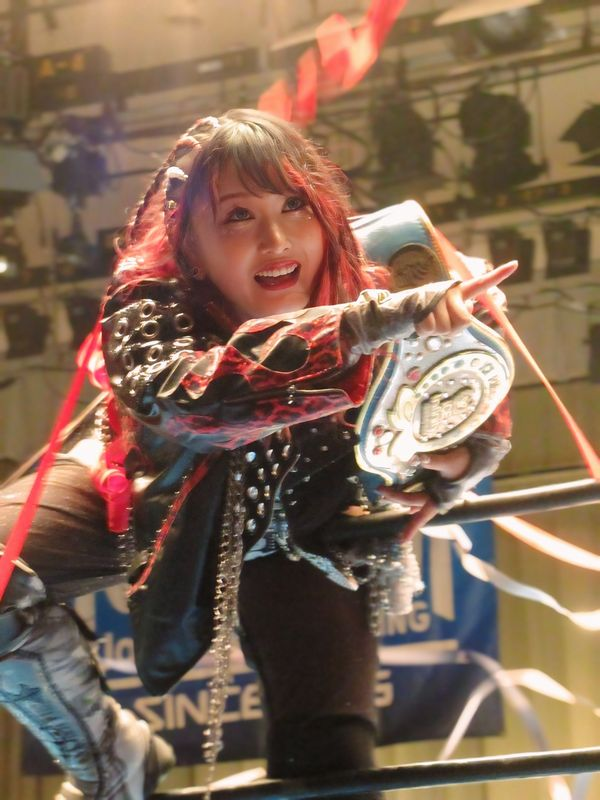
- Yuuri in July 2024

Personal information
- Born: September 16, 1997 (age 29) Tokyo, Japan

Professional wrestling career
- Ring name(s): Hong Kong International Police Woman; Trainee Y YuuRI; Yuuri
- Billed height: 156 cm (5 ft 1 in)
- Billed weight: 50 kg (110 lb)
- Trained by: Taka Michinoku
- Debut: 2020

Yuuri (stylized as YuuRI, born September 16, 1997) is a Japanese professional wrestler currently signed to the Japanese promotion Ganbare Pro-Wrestling. She is also known for her time in Ice Ribbon where she is a former two-time ICE Cross Infinity Champion and a former International Ribbon Tag Team Champion.

== Professional wrestling career ==
=== Independent scene (2019–present) ===
Due to partially working as a freelancer, Yuuri competed in several companies of the Japanese independent scene. At TJPW Grand Princess '22 on March 19, she teamed up with Moeka Haruhi, Yuna Manase and Harukaze to defeat Haruna Neko, Kaya Toribami, Mahiro Kiryu and Nao Kakuta. At CyberFight Festival 2022, a cross-over event promoted by DDT Pro Wrestling, Pro Wrestling Noah and Tokyo Joshi Pro-Wrestling on June 12, 2022, she worked as a joshi talent as she teamed up with Hyper Misao, Yuki Aino, Pom Harajuku and Haruna Neko in a losing effort against Nao Kakuta, Mahiro Kiryu, Moka Miyamoto, Arisu Endo and Kaya Toribami. Yuuri competed in a league created by Marvelous That's Women Pro Wrestling to resurrect the AAAW Tag Team Championship in 2022. She teamed up with Yuna Manase as "Nippon Ganbare Union" and placed themselves in the A block where they scored a total of two points after going against the teams of Ancham and Chikayo Nagashima, Kaoru Ito and Tomoko Watanabe, and Hibiscus Mii and Takumi Iroha. At Stardom New Blood 3, an event promoted by World Wonder Ring Stardom on July 8, 2022, Yuuri fell short to Mai Sakurai.

=== Professional Wrestling Just Tap Out (2020–present) ===
Yuuri made her professional wrestling debut in Professional Wrestling Just Tap Out (JTO) on September 27, 2020, at JTO GIRLS 3 as "Trainee Y", where she fell short to Trainee K (Sumika Yanagawa) in an exhibition match. At a house show from April 9, 2023, Yuuri unsuccessfully challenged Tomoka Inaba for the Queen of JTO Championship.

=== Ganbare Pro-Wrestling (2020–present) ===
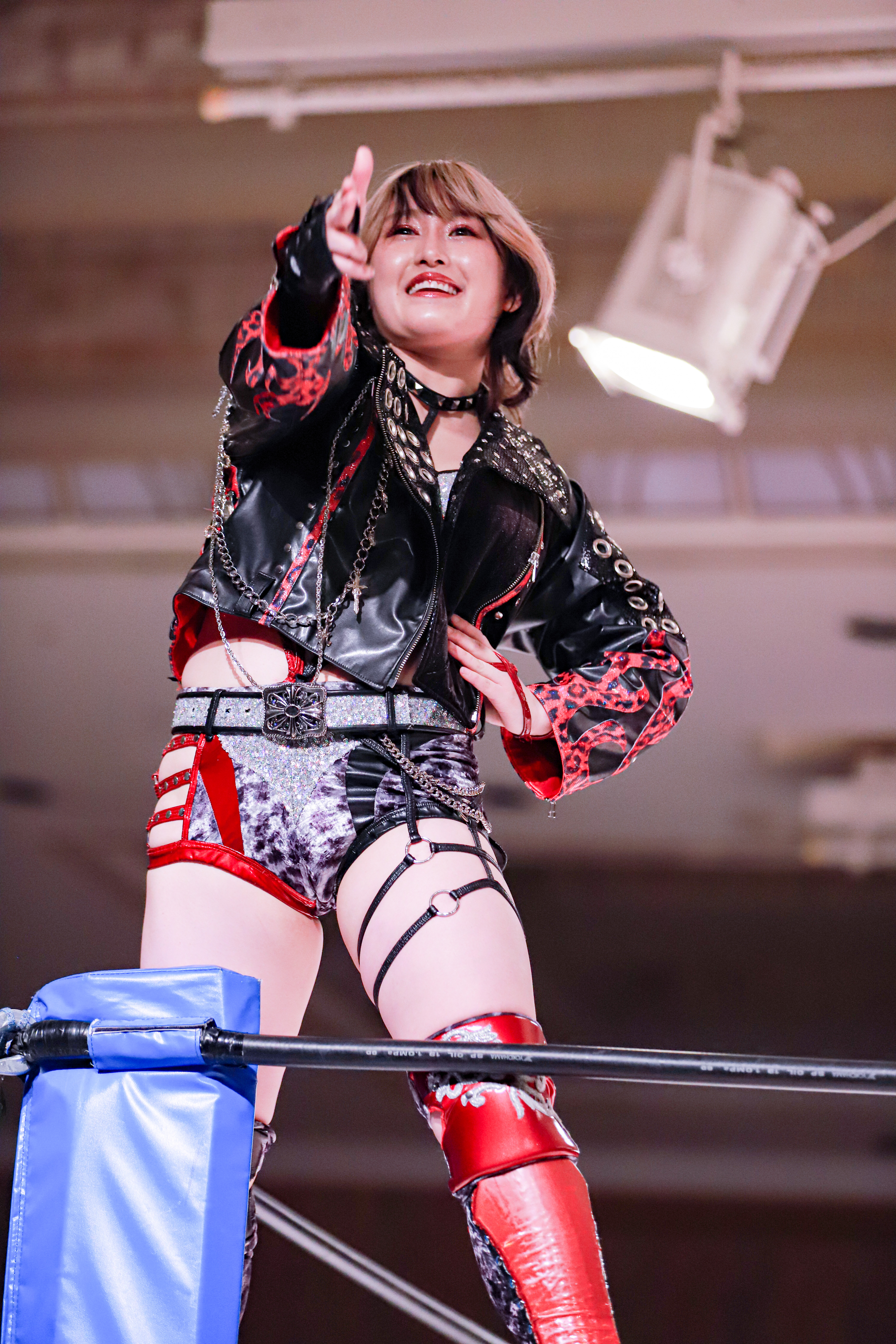
Yuuri in February 2023

Yuuri made her debut in Ganbare Pro-Wrestling at DDT Ganbare Pro Joshi Pro-Wrestling ~ The World Calls It Love on September 4, 2021, where she fell short to Yuna Manase in singles competition. In Ganbare, Yuuri got herself the nickname of "Glamorous Valkyrie" and underwent a series of three trial matches. In the first one, she fell short to Asuka at DDT Ganbare Pro Joshi Pro-Wrestling ~ Itoshisato Kokoronokabe 2021 on October 24, At DDT Ganbare Pro Joshi Pro-Wrestling ~ Hikari No Rock on November 7, 2021, she fell short to Maya Yukihi. In the last bout of the series from DDT Ganbare Pro Joshi Pro-Wrestling ~ Protect You And Love You on December 19, 2021, Yuuri fell short to Saki. At Wrestle Sekigahara on July 10, 2022, Yuuri teamed up with Onryo and Lingerie Muto in a losing effort against Ganbare Tamagawa, Nobuhiro Shimatani and Harukaze as a result of a mixed six-person tag team match. During her time in the promotion, she took part in various match gimmicks. At Ganbare Pro Yuusei Kara No Buutai X 2023 on June 3, she competed in a battle royal won by Moeka Haruhi and also involving various opponents, both male and female such as Soma Takao, Yumehito Imanari, Shota, Keisuke Ishii, Mizuki Watase and many others.

=== Ice Ribbon (2022–present) ===
Yuuri made her debut in Ice Ribbon in early 2022. She took part in the 2022 edition of the Kizuna Tournament in which she teamed up with Satsuki Totoro and fell short to Amin and Ibuki Hoshi in the first rounds from New Ice Ribbon #1237 on October 30. On the same night, at the evening show, she competed in a battle royal won by Kaho Matsushita and also involving Hamuko Hoshi, Ram Kaicho, Saori Anou, Maika Ozaki and others. At New Ice Ribbon #1289 ~ Yokohama Ribbon 2023 on July 17, 2023, Yuuri defeated Totoro to win the ICE×∞ Championship, making it the first title in her career. At Ganbare Pro GanJo Battle Garegga '23 on August 11, she made her first successful title defense against Ami Manase. At New Ice Ribbon #1297 ~ Ice In Wonderland 2023 on August 26, Yuuri lost the title to Hoshi, ending her reign at 40 days.

At New Ice Ribbon #1311 on November 3, Yuuri teamed up with Ancham to defeat Hoshi and Matsushita for the vacant International Ribbon Tag Team Championship. At New Ice Ribbon #1317 on December 17, the team (now named "Queen Valkyrie"), made their first successful title defense against Totoro and Asuka Fujitaki. At New Ice Ribbon #1320 ~ RibbonMania 2023 on December 31, they lost the titles to Cheerful (Kyuri and Mifu Ashida), ending their reign at 58 days. At New Ice Ribbon #1354 ~ After The Rain on June 23, 2024, Yuuri defeated Hamuko Hoshi in a league final to win the vacant ICE×∞ Championship for the second time. She made her first successful title defense against Tsukina Umino on August 24 at New Ice Ribbon #1366 ~ Ice In Wonderland 2024. At New Ice Ribbon #1376 ~ Oktober Iceribbon Fest 2024 on October 19, Yuuri lost the title to Yuki Mashiro, ending her second reign at 118 days.

== Championships and accomplishments ==
- Ice Ribbon
  - ICE×∞ Championship (2 times)
  - International Ribbon Tag Team Championship (1 time) – with Ancham
- Pro Wrestling Illustrated
  - Ranked No. 102 of the top 250 female wrestlers in the PWI Women's 250 in 2024
- Pro Wrestling Wave
  - Wave Tag Team Championship (1 time) – with Natsu Sumire
