= Ancham =

Japanese professional wrestler

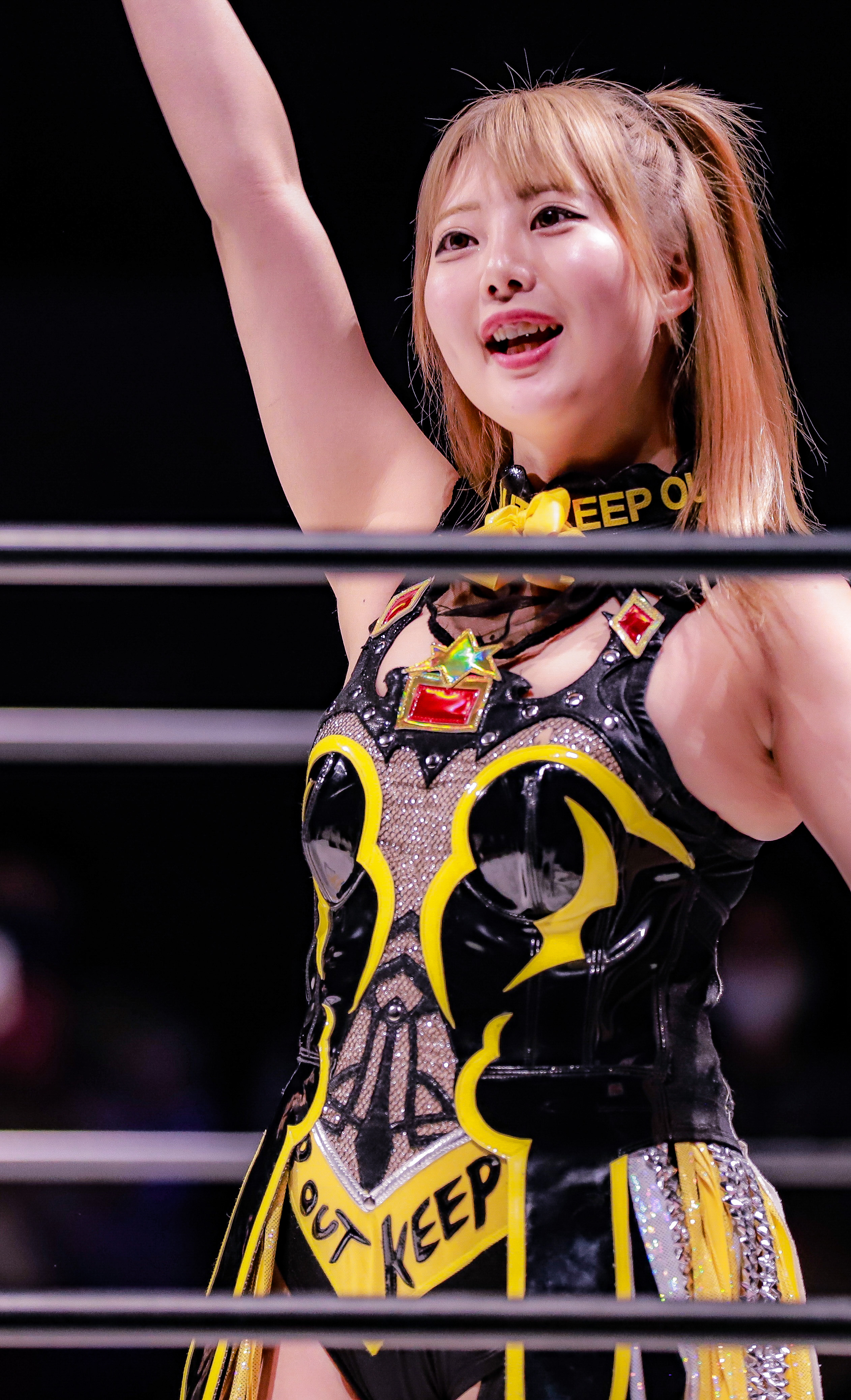
- Ancham in March 2023

Personal information
- Born: Anna Fujiki; May 17, 1998 (age 28) Nagano, Japan

Professional wrestling career
- Ring name(s): Ancham; Babyface
- Billed height: 1.55 m (5 ft 1 in)
- Trained by: Emi Sakura
- Debut: 2018

Anna Fujiki (藤木杏奈, Fujiki Anna), currently ring name as Ancham (杏ちゃむ, Anchamu) is a Japanese professional wrestler and gravure idol. Now currently working as a freelancer and is best known for her time in the Japanese professional wrestling promotions Ice Ribbon and Gatoh Move Pro Wrestling, as well as in many other promotions from the Japanese independent scene.

== Professional wrestling career ==
=== Gatoh Move Pro Wrestling (2018–2020) ===
Ancham made her professional wrestling debut in Gatoh Move Pro Wrestling at Gatoh Move Good Work Summer ~ Please Swim This Summer, an event promoted on July 28, 2018, where she fell short to her own coach, Emi Sakura in singles competition. Spending a cumulate of roughly two years with the promotion, she competed in various match types and gimmicks. At Gatoh Move Japan Tour #386 on October 17, 2018, she wrestled in a Halloween battle royal, bout won by Riho, and also involving various other notable opponents such as Antonio Honda, Baliyan Akki, Choun Shiryu, Masahiro Takanashi, Mei Suruga, Mitsuru Konno, Sayaka Obihiro and Yuna Mizumori. She wrestled her last match for the company at Gatoh Move Gtmv #42 on March 22, 2020, where she fell short to Mei Suruga in singles competition.

=== Independent circuit (2019–present) ===
Ancham has competed for a multitude of promotions on the Japanese independent scene. At FMW-E Carnival, an event promoted by Frontier Martial-Arts Wrestling on December 19, 2021, she competed in a hardcore rumble match won by Atsushi Onita and also involving many other notable opponents, mostly men, such as Abdullah Kobayashi, Brahman Kei, Brahman Shu, Hikaru Sato, Mr. Pogo, Ricky Fuji and others. She competed in a tag league for the revived AAAW Tag Team Championship of Marvelous That's Women Pro Wrestling between February 24 and May 1, 2022, in which she teamed up with Chikayo Nagashima, placing themselves in the A block where they scored a total of three points after going against the teams of Kaoru Ito and Tomoko Watanabe, Hibiscus Mii and Takumi Iroha, and Nippon Ganbare Union (Yuna Manase and Yuuri), failing to advance to the finals. At World Wonder Ring Stardom's New Blood 5 event from October 19, 2022, Ancham teamed up with Suzu Suzuki to defeat Queen's Quest (Hina and Lady C). At WAVE Detras De Lazona Vol. 9, an event promoted by Pro Wrestling Wave on February 5, 2023, Ancham lost to Haruka Umesaki. On the first-ever event hosted by Sukeban, Ancham teamed up with Maya Mamushi as part of "The Harajuku Stars" stable in a losing effort against Dangerous Liaisons (Commander Nakajima and Lady Antoinette). At Pure-J Osaka Festival on October 1, 2023, she competed in a three-way match won by Kyusei Ninja Ranmaru and also involving Kazuki.

=== Ice Ribbon (2021–present) ===
Ancham made her debut in Ice Ribbon at Ribbon's 15th Anniversary on August 9, 2021, where she teamed up with Asahi, Shizuku Tsukata and Yappy in a losing effort against Banny Oikawa, Momo Kohgo, Riko Kaiju and Rina Shingaki as a result of an eight-woman tag team match. At Ice Ribbon New Ice Ribbon #1311 on November 3, 2023, Ancham teamed up with YuuRI to defeat Ibuki Hoshi and Kaho Matsushita for the vacant International Ribbon Tag Team Championship.

== Championships and accomplishments ==
- Ice Ribbon
  - International Ribbon Tag Team Championship (2 times) – with Yuuri (1) and Yappy (1)
