= Maika Ozaki =

Japanese professional wrestler

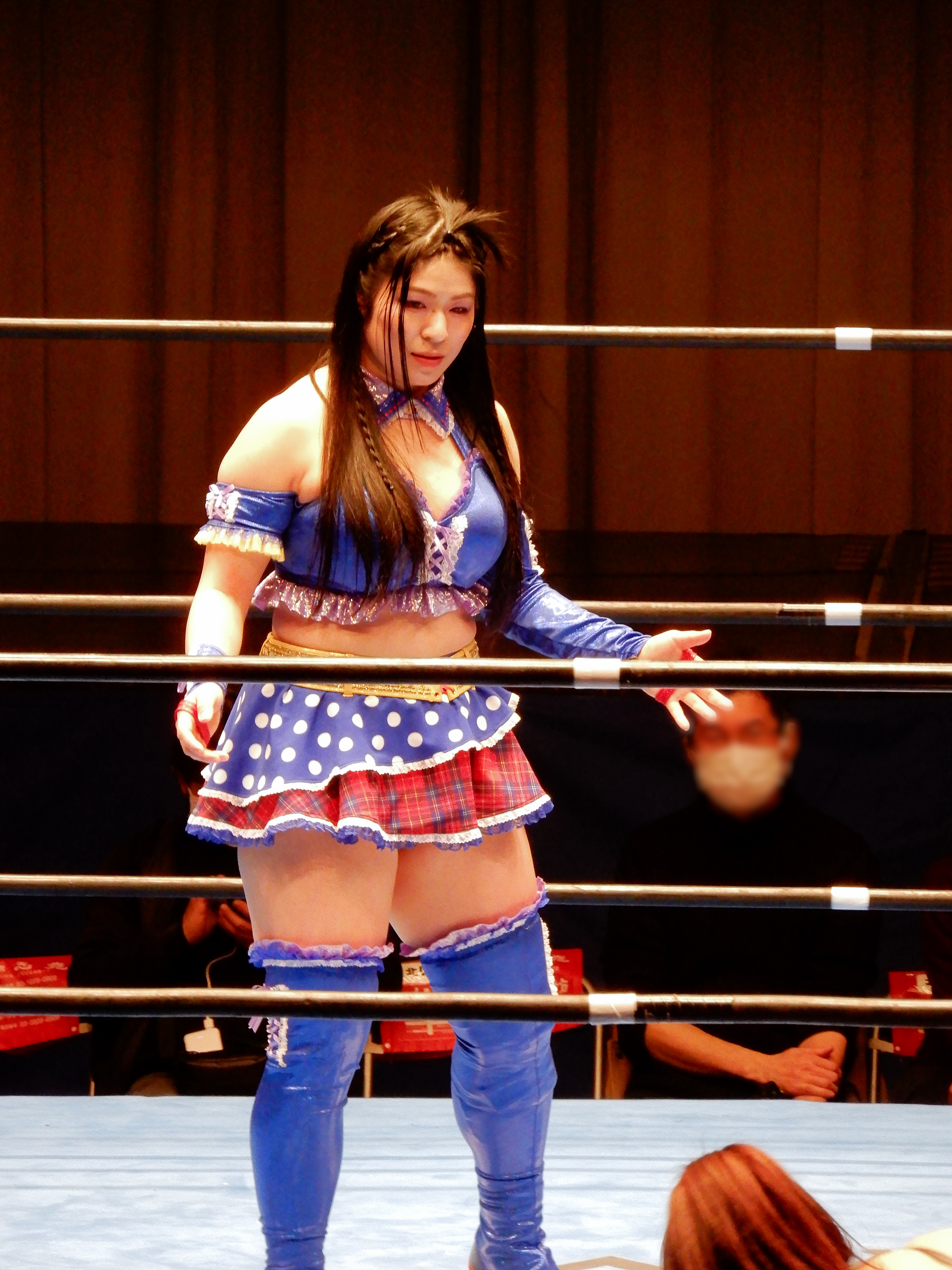
- Ozaki in February 2022

Personal information
- Born: May 31, 1991 (age 35) Kyoto, Japan

Professional wrestling career
- Ring name(s): Saka Ozaki; Maika Ozaki
- Billed height: 157 cm (5 ft 2 in)
- Billed weight: 59 kg (130 lb)
- Trained by: Yuna Manase
- Debut: 2015

Maika Ozaki (尾崎妹加, Ozaki Maika) is a Japanese professional wrestler currently working as a freelancer and is best known for her tenure with the Japanese promotions Ice Ribbon and Actwres girl'Z.

== Professional wrestling career ==
=== Independent circuit (2015-present) ===
Ozaki made her professional wrestling debut at the first-ever event of Actwres girl'Z, the AgZ Prologue from May 31, 2015 where she defeated Yuuki Harima.

As a freelancer, Ozaki is known for competing in various promotions. At Maki Narumiya Thank You For All, an event produced by Reina Pro Wrestling on March 25, 2016, she teamed up with Tae Honma in a losing effort to Natsumi Maki and Saori Anou. At JWP Pure Plum, an event promoted by JWP Joshi Puroresu on August 14, 2016, Ozaki teamed up with Tsukushi in a losing effort to Manami Katsu and Rabbit Miu. At WAVE Young OH! OH! The Final, an event promoted by Pro Wrestling Wave on December 15, 2016, Ozaki competed in a nine-person battle royal also involving Asuka, Konami, Rydeen Hagane, Fairy Nihonbashi and others.

==== Big Japan Pro Wrestling (2016-2019) ====
Ozaki worked several times as female talent in Big Japan Pro Wrestling. At BJW Summer Ueno Pro-Wrestling Festival on August 16, 2016, she teamed up with Hiragi Kurumi to defeat Mochi Miyagi and Tequila Saya. At a house show from June 9, 2018 she teamed up with Akane Fujita in a losing effort against Maya Yukihi and Risa Sera as a result of a tag team match.

==== Ice Ribbon (2015-present) ====
Ozaki spent most of her career working in Ice Ribbon. At Ice Ribbon Hiragi Kurumi 10th Anniversary from May 29, 2020, she teamed up with Hamuko Hoshi to defeat Best Friends (Arisa Nakajima and Tsukasa Fujimoto) in a comedic hot dog eating match. At Ice Ribbon New Ice Ribbon #1054 on July 25, 2020, she competed in a five-way elimination match to determine the #1 contender for the ICE Cross Infinity Championship won by Suzu Suzuki and aldo involving Hamuko Hoshi, Ibuki Hoshi and Satsuki Totoro. At Ice Ribbon New Ice Ribbon #1013 she competed in a 45-person gauntlet match in which the retiring Tequila Saya took all the rest of the opponents to a draw such as Cherry, Itsuki Aoki, Kaori Yoneyama, Syuri, Ken Ohka, Manami Toyota, Matsuya Uno, Yuki Mashiro and many others. Ozaki is a former International Ribbon Tag Team Champion, title which she won by teaming up with Maya Yukihi as "Rebel X Enemy" at RibbonMania 2020 on December 31 by defeating Frank Sisters (Hiragi Kurumi and Mochi Miyagi.

She is known for competing in the promotion's signature events such as the Kizuna Tournament. At the 2020 edition she teamed up with Tequila Saya and defeated Giulia and Tsukushi in a first round match, Hiragi Kurumi and Yappy in a second round but fell short to Risa Sera and Suzu Suzuki in the semi-finals from August 20.

== Championships and accomplishments ==
- Actwres girl'Z
  - AWG Tag Team Championship (1 time, inaugural) – with Tae Honma
  - AWG Tag Team Title Tournament (2021) – with Tae Honma
- Ice Ribbon
  - International Ribbon Tag Team Championship (2 times) – with Kyuri (1) and Maya Yukihi (1)
  - Triangle Ribbon Championship (1 time)
  - Ice Ribbon Year-End Award (1 time)
    - Enemy Award (2017) tied with Manami Toyota
- Pro Wrestling Illustrated
  - Ranked No. 175 of the top 250 female wrestlers in the PWI Women's 250 in 2024
- Pro Wrestling Wave
  - Wave Tag Team Championship (2 times) – with Tae Honma
  - Dual Shock Wave (2024, 2025) – with Tae Honma
- World Woman Pro-Wrestling Diana
  - World Woman Pro-Wrestling Diana World Championship (1 time)
  - World Woman Pro-Wrestling Diana Tag Team Championship (1 time) – with Tae Honma
- Wrestling of Darkness 666
  - 666 Disorder Openweight Championship (1 time, current)
