= International Ribbon Tag Team Championship =

Professional wrestling women's tag team championship

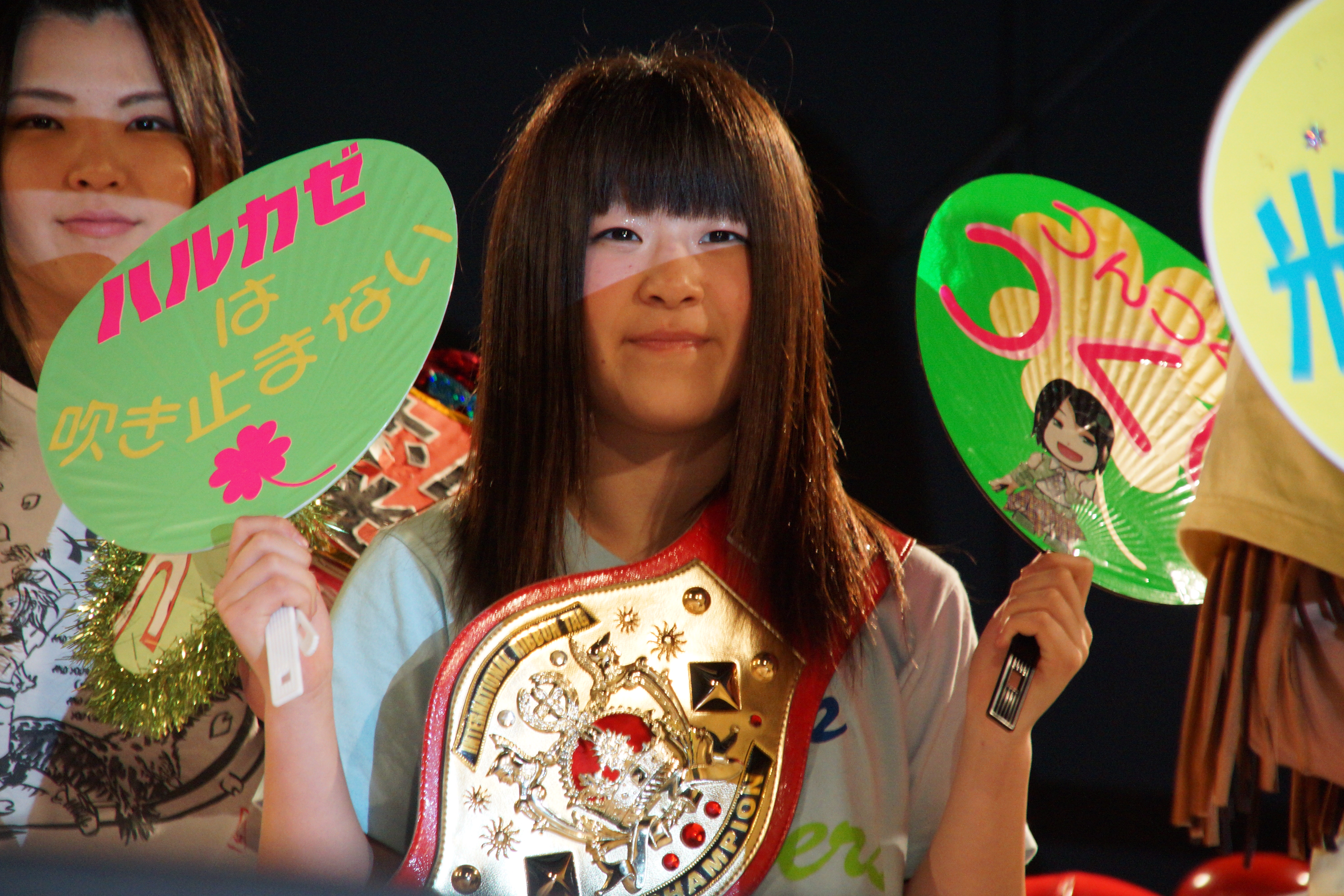
- Tsukushi, record ten-time International Ribbon Tag Team Champion, with one of the championships in April 2012

Details
- Promotion: Ice Ribbon
- Date established: April 4, 2007
- Current champions: Hikari&Manami (Hikari Minami and Manami Katsu)
- Date won: August 30, 2026
Statistics
- First champions: Neo Machineguns (Tanny Mouse and Yuki Miyazaki)
- Most reigns: As a team (4 reigns): Azure Revolution (Maya Yukihi and Risa Sera); This is Ice Ribbon (Kurumi/Hiragi Kurumi and Tsukushi); As an individual (10 reigns): Tsukushi
- Longest reign: Stap (Maki Narumiya and Risa Sera) (356 days)
- Shortest reign: Gentaro and Mai Ichii (2 days)
- Oldest champion: Hamuko Hoshi (41 years, 269 days)
- Youngest champion: Riho (11 years, 142 days)
- Heaviest champion: Jun Kasai (91.5 kg (202 lb))
- Lightest champion: Riho (28 kg (62 lb))

The International Ribbon Tag Team Championship (Japanese: インターナショナル・リボンタッグ王座, Hepburn: intānashonaru Ribon Taggu Ōza) is a professional wrestling tag team championship owned by the Ice Ribbon promotion. The championship was introduced on April 4, 2007, at an Ice Ribbon and Neo Japan Ladies Pro Wrestling co-promoted event, where the Neo Machineguns (Tanny Mouse and Yuki Miyazaki) defeated Aya Yuki and Ran Yu-Yu in the finals of a tournament to become the inaugural champions. Championship matches have a 20-minute time limit, and the title is vacated in the event of a time limit draw. Though primarily contested for by female wrestlers, seven male wrestlers; Masako Takanashi, Chounko/Choun Shiryu, Yuki Sato, Jun Kasai, Isami Kodaka, Gentaro and Makoto Oishi, have also held the championship.

== Title history ==
Neo Machineguns (Tanny Mouse and Yuki Miyazaki) were the first champion in the title's history. .Stap (Maki Narumiya and Risa Sera) holds the record for the longest reign at 356 days, as well as the most title defenses (9) in a single run along with Muscle Venus' (Hikaru Shida and Tsukasa Fujimoto) 3rd reign. Gentaro and Mai Ichii hold the record for the shortest reign, at two days. This is Ice Ribbon (Kurumi and Tsukushi) hold the record for most reigns as a team, with four. Tsukushi holds the record for most reigns individually, with nine.

Like most professional wrestling championships, the title is won as a result of a scripted match.

== Reigns ==
As of November 22, 2026, there have been a total of 68 reigns shared between 53 teams composed of 65 individual champions and nine vacancies. Neo Machineguns (Tanny Mouse and Yuki Miyazaki) were the inaugural champions. The teams Azure Revolution (Maya Yukihi and Risa Sera) and This is Ice Ribbon (Hiragi Kurumi and Tsukushi) are tied with most reigns at four, while individually, Tsukushi has the most reigns at ten. Stap (Maki Narumiya and Risa Sera)'s reign is the longest at 356 days, while Gentaro and Mai Ichii's reign is the shortest at 2 days. Hamuko Hoshi is the oldest champion at 40 years old, while Riho is the youngest at 11 years old.

Key
No.	Overall reign number
Reign	Reign number for the specific team—reign numbers for the individuals are in parentheses, if different
Days	Number of days held
Defenses	Number of successful defenses
+	Current reign is changing daily

No.	Champion	Championship change			Reign statistics			Notes	Ref.
No.	Champion	Date	Event	Location	Reign	Days	Defenses	Notes	Ref.
1	Neo Machineguns (Tanny Mouse and Yuki Miyazaki)	April 4, 2007	Neo Ribbon Starting Over	Tokyo, Japan	1	303	2	Miyazaki and Mouse defeated Aya Yuki and Ran Yu-Yu in the finals of a four-team tournament to become the inaugural champions.	
2	Etsuko Mita and Makoto	February 1, 2008	Ice Ribbon 60	Tokyo, Japan	1	179	2		
3	Masa Takanashi and Choun Shiryu	July 29, 2008	Ice Ribbon 107	Tokyo, Japan	1	87	0		
4	Riho and Yuki Sato	October 24, 2008	Ice Ribbon 12	Tokyo, Japan	1	162	1		
—	Vacated	April 4, 2009	Ice Ribbon 66	Tokyo, Japan	—	—	—	The championship was vacated, after Riho fractured her right leg on March 31.	
5	Nanamino (Minori Makiba and Nanae Takahashi)	April 12, 2009	Ice Ribbon 71	Tokyo, Japan	1	162	0	Makiba and Takahashi defeated Emi Sakura and Makoto in the finals of a four-team tournament to win the vacant championship.	
6	YoneSakura (Emi Sakura and Kaori Yoneyama)	September 21, 2009	Ice Ribbon 118: Autumn Itabashi Women's Pro-Wrestling Festival	Tokyo, Japan	1	83	2		
7	Azumi Hyuga and Ran Yu-Yu	December 13, 2009	JWP–Climax 2009: 2nd	Kawasaki, Kanagawa, Japan	1	18	0	This match was also contested for the Daily Sports Women's and JWP Tag Team Championships.	
—	Vacated	December 31, 2009	JWP–Climax 2009: Azumi Hyuga Final	Tokyo, Japan	—	—	—	The championship was vacated, after Azumi Hyuga retired from professional wrestling.	
8	Meat Monsters (Hamuko Hoshi and Hiroyo Matsumoto)	January 4, 2010	Shinshun Ribbon Shinkiba Tournament	Tokyo, Japan	1	47	1	Hoshi and Matsumoto defeated Mai Ichii and Nanae Takahashi to win the vacant championship.	
9	Passion Red (Kazumi Shimouma and Nanae Takahashi)	February 20, 2010	Ice Ribbon 158: Osaka Ribbon II	Osaka, Japan	1 (1, 2)	72	0		
10	385Myankie's (Jun Kasai and Miyako Matsumoto)	May 3, 2010	Ice Ribbon 180: Golden Ribbon	Tokyo, Japan	1	96	1	This was a three-way hardcore match, also involving Gentaro and Keita Yano.	
11	Chii Tomiya and Isami Kodaka	August 7, 2010	Ice Ribbon 207: Itabashi Tournament	Tokyo, Japan	1	47	0		
12	Gentaro and Mai Ichii	September 23, 2010	Knights of Ice Ribbon	Tokyo, Japan	1	2	0		
13	Emi Sakura and Nanae Takahashi	September 25, 2010	Ice Ribbon 221	Tokyo, Japan	1 (2, 3)	77	6		
—	Vacated	December 11, 2010	Ice Ribbon 244	Tokyo, Japan	—	—	—	The championship was vacated, after Emi Sakura and Nanae Takahashi wrestled Hikaru Shida and Yoshiko Tamura to a twenty-minute time limit draw.	
14	Muscle Venus (Hikaru Shida and Tsukasa Fujimoto)	December 23, 2010	Ice Ribbon 248	Tokyo, Japan	1	93	3	Shida and Fujimoto defeated Emi Sakura and Nanae Takahashi in the finals of a four-team tournament to win the vacant championship.	
15	Emi Sakura and Ray	March 26, 2011	Ice Ribbon 276	Tokyo, Japan	1 (3, 1)	67	4		
16	Lovely Butchers (Hamuko Hoshi and Mochi Miyagi)	June 1, 2011	Ice Ribbon 272: 19 O'Clock Girls ProWrestling 1st Anniversary Show	Tokyo, Japan	1 (2, 1)	10	1		
17	Choun Shiryu and Makoto Oishi	June 11, 2011	Ice Ribbon 298	Tokyo, Japan	1 (2, 1)	56	0		
18	Lovely Butchers (Hamuko Hoshi and Mochi Miyagi)	August 6, 2011	Ice Ribbon 312	Saitama, Japan	2 (3, 2)	7	0		
19	Emi Sakura and Makoto	August 13, 2011	Ice Ribbon 314	Saitama, Japan	1 (4, 2)	11	1		
—	Vacated	August 24, 2011	—	—	—	—	—	The championship was vacated, after Makoto left Ice Ribbon for Smash.	
20	Jumonji Sisters (Dash Chisako and Sendai Sachiko)	September 24, 2011	Ice Ribbon 326: Yokohama Ribbon	Yokohama, Kanagawa, Japan	1	21	0	Chisako and Sachiko defeated Manami Toyota and Tsukushi in the finals of an eight team tournament to win the vacant title.	
—	Vacated	October 15, 2011	Ice Ribbon 331	Saitama, Japan	—	—	—	The championship was vacated, after Chisako and Sachiko wrestled Tsukasa Fujimoto and Tsukushi to a twenty-minute time limit draw.	
21	Emi Sakura and Tsukushi	December 25, 2011	RibbonMania	Tokyo, Japan	1 (5, 1)	3	0	Sakura and Tsukushi defeated Meiko Satomura and Sendai Sachiko to win the vacant championship.	
22	Hikaru Shida and Maki Narumiya	December 28, 2011	Ice Ribbon 356	Saitama, Japan	1 (2, 1)	39	2		
23	Dropkickers (Tsukasa Fujimoto and Tsukushi)	February 5, 2012	Yokohama Ribbon	Yokohama, Kanagawa, Japan	1 (2, 2)	90	1		
24	Happy Makers (Aoi Kizuki and Sayaka Obihiro)	May 5, 2012	Golden Ribbon	Tokyo, Japan	1	43	0		
25	Dropkickers (Tsukasa Fujimoto and Tsukushi)	June 17, 2012	6th Anniversary: Rising an Ice Army	Tokyo, Japan	2 (3, 3)	28	0		
26	Miyako Matsumoto and Neko Nitta	July 15, 2012	Sapporo Ribbon	Sapporo, Hokkaido, Japan	1 (2, 1)	35	0		
27	Kurumi and Tsukushi	August 19, 2012	Muscle Venus 4th Anniversary	Tokyo, Japan	1 (1, 4)	98	2		
28	Muscle Venus (Hikaru Shida and Tsukasa Fujimoto)	November 25, 2012	Nagayo Ribbon	Nagoya, Aichi, Japan	2 (3, 4)	3	0	This was a title vs. title match in which Muscle Venus also defended the REINA X World Tag Team Championship.	
29	Hailey Hatred and Hamuko Hoshi	November 28, 2012	Ice Ribbon 431	Saitama, Japan	1 (1, 4)	21	0	Muscle Venus (Hikaru Shida and Tsukasa Fujimoto) also defended their REINA X World Tag Team Championship in this match.	
30	Kyoko Kimura and Sayaka Obihiro	December 19, 2012	Ice Ribbon 434	Saitama, Japan	1 (1, 2)	12	0	Hailey Hatred and Hamuko Hoshi also defended their REINA X World Tag Team Championship in this match.	
31	Seishun Midori (Aoi Kizuki and Tsukushi)	December 31, 2012	RibbonMania	Tokyo, Japan	1 (2, 5)	144	1	Kyoko Kimura and Sayaka Obihiro also defended their REINA X World Tag Team Championship in this match.	
32	Muscle Venus (Hikaru Shida and Tsukasa Fujimoto)	May 24, 2013	Yokohama Ribbon	Yokohama, Kanagawa, Japan	3 (4, 5)	304	8	Seishun Midori (Aoi Kizuki and Tsukushi) also defended their REINA X World Tag Team Championship in this match.	
—	Vacated	March 24, 2014	—	—	—	—	—	The championship was vacated due to Hikaru Shida resigning from Ice Ribbon.	
33	Stap (Maki Narumiya and Risa Sera)	March 30, 2014	Tokyo Ribbon	Tokyo, Japan	1 (2, 1)	356	8	Stap defeated Kurumi and Tsukushi to win the vacant championship.	
34	Shishunki (Mio Shirai and Tsukushi)	March 21, 2015	Ice Ribbon March	Tokyo, Japan	1 (1, 6)	150	2		
35	Nekoka Tag (Leon and Neko Nitta)	August 18, 2015	Ice in Wonderland	Tokyo, Japan	1 (1, 2)	36	0		
36	Orange Happies (Aoi Kizuki and Kayoko Haruyama)	September 23, 2015	Ice Ribbon 680	Yokohama, Kanagawa, Japan	1 (3, 1)	24	0		
37	Best Friends (Arisa Nakajima and Tsukasa Fujimoto)	October 17, 2015	October Ice Ribbon Fest	Tokyo, Japan	1 (1, 6)	338	4		
38	This is Ice Ribbon (Hiragi Kurumi and Tsukushi)	September 19, 2016	Yokohama Ribbon ~Autumn~	Yokohama, Kanagawa, Japan	2 (2, 7)	20	0		
39	Avid Rival (Misaki Ohata and Ryo Mizunami)	October 9, 2016	Ice Ribbon 760	Sapporo, Hokkaido, Japan	1	168	3		
40	This is Ice Ribbon (Hiragi Kurumi and Tsukushi)	March 26, 2017	Ice Ribbon March	Tokyo, Japan	3 (3, 8)	63	2		
—	Vacated	May 28, 2017	Ryōgoku KFC Hall Tournament	Tokyo, Japan	—	—	—	The championship was vacated, after This is Ice Ribbon (Hiragi Kurumi and Tsukushi) wrestled Lovely Butchers (Hamuko Hoshi and Mochi Miyagi) to a twenty-minute time limit draw.	
41	This is Ice Ribbon (Hiragi Kurumi and Tsukushi)	June 11, 2017	Sapporo Ribbon	Sapporo, Hokkaido, Japan	4 (4, 9)	90	0	This is Ice Ribbon defeated Hamuko Hoshi and Ibuki Hoshi to win the vacant championship.	
—	Vacated	September 9, 2017	Ice Ribbon 836	Saitama, Japan	—	—	—	The championship was vacated due to Tsukushi's inactivity following her July 2017 arrest.	
42	Azure Revolution (Maya Yukihi and Risa Sera)	October 29, 2017	October Ice Ribbon Fest	Tokyo, Japan	1 (1, 2)	245	7	Azure Revolution defeated the Lovely Butchers (Hamuko Hoshi and Mochi Miyagi) in the finals of an eight-team tournament to win the vacant title.	
43	Lovely Butchers (Hamuko Hoshi and Mochi Miyagi)	July 1, 2018	Sapporo Ribbon	Sapporo, Hokkaido, Japan	3 (5, 3)	183	4		
44	Gekokujo Tag (Kyuri and Maika Ozaki)	December 31, 2018	RibbonMania	Tokyo, Japan	1	76	2		
45	Azure Revolution (Maya Yukihi and Risa Sera)	March 17, 2019	Chiba Ribbon (Evening Show)	Chiba, Japan	2 (2, 3)	120	2		
46	Burning Raw (Giulia and Tequila Saya)	July 15, 2019	Yokohama Ribbon	Yokohama, Kanagawa, Japan	1	70	2		
47	Azure Revolution (Maya Yukihi and Risa Sera)	September 23, 2019	Yokohama Ribbon	Yokohama, Kanagawa, Japan	3 (3, 4)	41	0		
48	Dropkickers (Tsukasa Fujimoto and Tsukushi)	November 3, 2019	Osaka Ribbon	Osaka, Japan	3 (7, 10)	280	6		
49	Frank Sisters (Hiragi Kurumi and Mochi Miyagi)	August 9, 2020	Ice Ribbon Yokohama Bunka Gymnasium Final	Yokohama, Kanagawa, Japan	1 (5, 4)	144	4		
50	Rebel X Enemy (Maika Ozaki and Maya Yukihi)	December 31, 2020	RibbonMania	Tokyo, Japan	1 (2, 4)	114	4		
51	Hiragi Kurumi and Hiroyo Matsumoto	April 24, 2021	Ice Ribbon 1112	Tokyo, Japan	1 (6, 2)	51	1		
—	Vacated	June 14, 2021	—	—	—	—	—		
52	Hiroyo Matsumoto and Tsukasa Fujimoto	July 24, 2021	Ice Ribbon 1135 ~ Summer Jumbo Ribbon 2021	Tokyo, Japan	1 (3, 8)	16	0	Fujimoto and Matsumoto defeated Akane Fujita and Risa Sera, and Rebel X Enemy (Maika Ozaki and Maya Yukihi) in a three-way tag team match to win the vacant titles.	
53	Azure Revolution (Maya Yukihi and Risa Sera)	August 9, 2021	Ice Ribbon 1139 ~ Ice Ribbon 15th Anniversary	Yokohama, Japan	4 (5, 5)	144	5	Between December 1 and 31, Yukihi and Sera held the titles under the stable banner of Prominence in which Yukihi has only acted as an associate.	
54	Parent&Child (Hamuko Hoshi and Ibuki Hoshi)	December 31, 2021	New Ice Ribbon #1168 ~ Ribbonmania 2021	Tokyo, Japan	1 (6, 1)	86	1		
55	galaxyPunch! (Hikari Shimizu and Saki)	March 27, 2022	New Ice Ribbon #1189 In 176BOX	Osaka, Japan	1	38	1		
56	Big☆Dekai (Satsuki Totoro and Yuna Manase)	May 4, 2022	Ice Ribbon New Ice Ribbon #1199 ~ Ice Ribbon Yokohama Budokan II	Yokohama, Japan	1	88	2		
57	Mukomako (Makoto and Hamuko Hoshi)	July 31, 2022	Summer Jumbo Ribbon 2022	Tokyo, Japan	1 (3, 7)	55	0		
58	Hikaru Shida and Ibuki Hoshi	September 24, 2022	New Ice Ribbon #1230	Tokyo, Japan	1 (5, 2)	176	1		
59	Mukomako (Makoto and Hamuko Hoshi)	March 19, 2023	New Ice Ribbon 1267	Tokyo, Japan	2 (4, 8)	160	3		
60	Misa Kagura and Sumika Yanagawa	August 26, 2023	Ice Ribbon New Ice Ribbon #1297 ~ Ice In Wonderland 2023	Tokyo, Japan	1	57	2	This was a three-way tag team match also involving Akari and Yappy.	
—	Vacated	October 22, 2023	Ice Ribbon #1309 In 176BOX	Osaka, Japan	—	—	—		
61	Queen Valkyrie (Ancham and Yuuri)	November 3, 2023	Ice Ribbon New Ice Ribbon #1311 In Tokyo Dome City	Tokyo, Japan	1	58	1	Defeated Ibuki Hoshi and Kaho Matsushita to win the vacant titles.	
62	Cheerful (Kyuri and Mifu Ashida)	December 31, 2023	Ice Ribbon New Ice Ribbon #1320 ~ RibbonMania 2023	Tokyo, Japan	1 (2, 1)	83	0		
63	Big☆Dekai (Satsuki Totoro and Yuna Manase)	March 23, 2024	Ice Ribbon New Ice Ribbon #1337 ~ Ice Ribbon March 2024	Tokyo, Japan	2	112	0		
64	Mukomako (Makoto and Hamuko Hoshi)	July 13, 2024	Ice Ribbon New Ice Ribbon #1358	Tokyo, Japan	3 (5, 9)	246	3		
65	KiraMiku (Kirari Wakana and Miku Kanae)	March 16, 2025	Ice Ribbon New Ice Ribbon #1408	Tokyo, Japan	1	42	0		
66	Cheerful Princess (Arisa Shinose and Misa Kagura)	April 27, 2025	Ice Ribbon New Ice Ribbon #1416	Tokyo, Japan	1 (1, 2)	28	0		
67	Bad Butts (Ancham and Yappy)	May 25, 2025	Ice Ribbon New Ice Ribbon #1422	Tokyo, Japan	1 (2, 1)	119	2		
68	Victoria Pinky (Manami Katsu and Misa Kagura)	September 21, 2025	Ice Ribbon New Ice Ribbon #1444	Tokyo, Japan	1 (1, 3)	155	0		
69	Mystic Eclipse (Makoto and Sumika Yanagawa)	February 23, 2026	Ice Ribbon New Ice Ribbon #1476	Tokyo, Japan	1 (6, 2)	188	3		
70	Hikari&Manami (Hikari Minami and Manami Katsu)	August 30, 2026	Ice Ribbon New Ice Ribbon #1511	Yokohama, Japan	1 (1, 2)	84+	0		

== Combined reigns ==
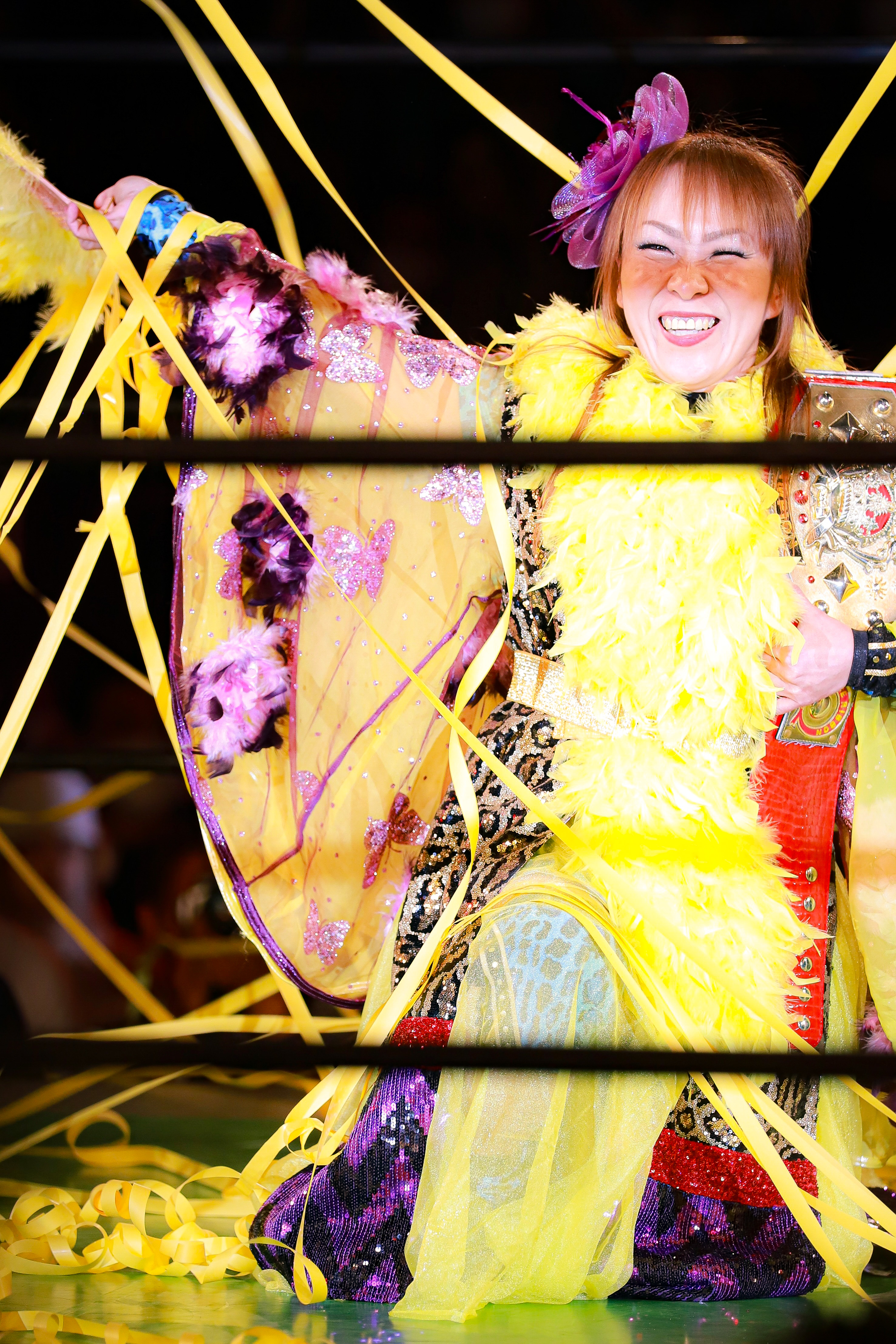
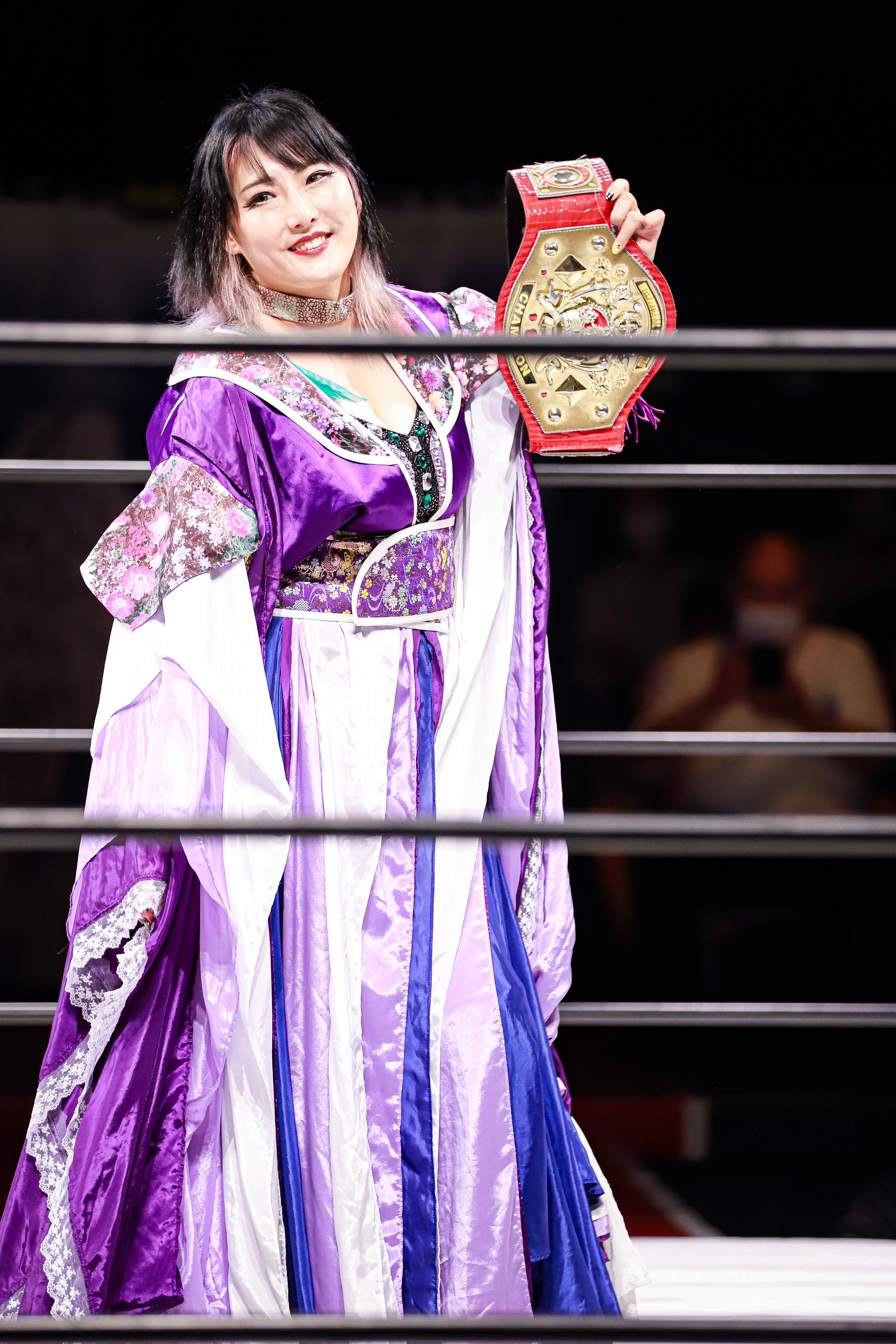
Three-time champions as a team, Mukomako (Hamuko Hoshi and Makoto).

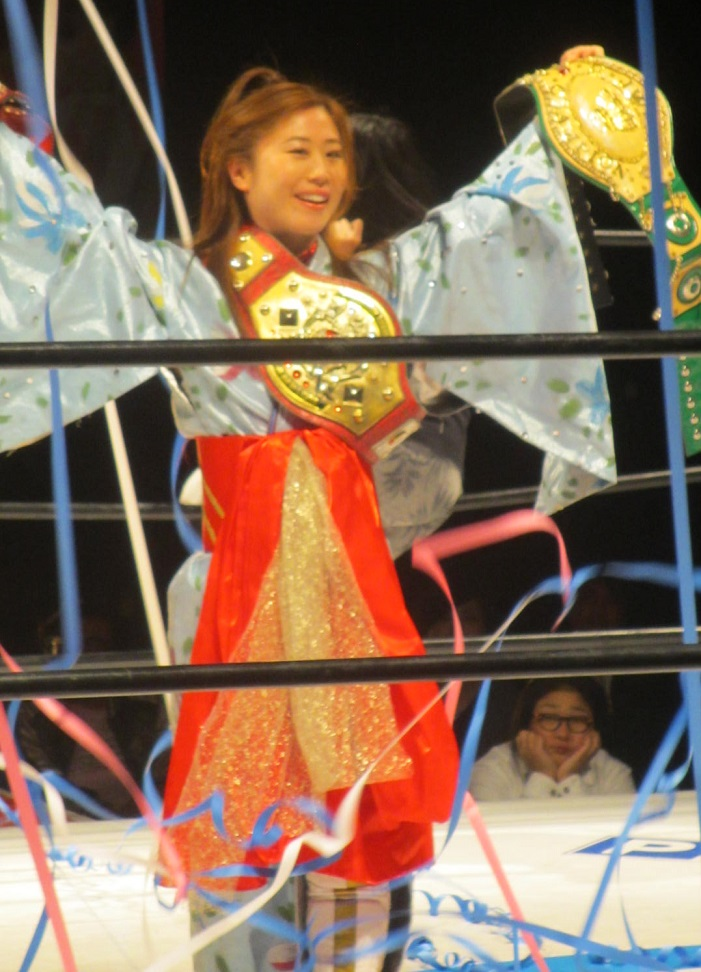
Eight-time and longest combined reigning champion at 1,152 days, Tsukasa Fujimoto

As of November 22, 2026

†	Indicates the current champions

=== By team ===
Rank	Team	No. of reigns	Combined defenses	Combined days
1	Azure Revolution (Maya Yukihi and Risa Sera)	4	14	550
2	Mukomako (Hamuko Hoshi and Makoto)	3	6	460
3	Muscle Venus (Hikaru Shida and Tsukasa Fujimoto)	3	11	400
4	Dropkickers (Tsukasa Fujimoto and Tsukushi)	3	6	398
5	Stap (Maki Narumiya and Risa Sera)	3	8	356
6	Best Friends (Arisa Nakajima and Tsukasa Fujimoto)	1	4	338
7	Neo Machineguns (Tanny Mouse and Yuki Miyazaki)	1	2	303
8	This is Ice Ribbon (Kurumi/Hiragi Kurumi and Tsukushi)	4	4	271
9	Big☆Dekai (Satsuki Totoro and Yuna Manase)	2	2	201
10	Lovely Butchers (Hamuko Hoshi and Mochi Miyagi)	3	5	200
11	Mystic Eclipse ( Makoto and Sumika Yanagawa)	1	3	188
12	Etsuko Mita and Makoto	1	2	179
13	Hikaru Shida and Ibuki Hoshi	1	1	176
14	Avid Rival (Misaki Ohata and Ryo Mizunami)	1	3	168
15	Nanamino (Minori Makiba and Nanae Takahashi)	1	0	162
15	Riho and Yuki Sato	1	1	162
17	Victoria Pinky (Manami Katsu and Misa Kagura)	1	0	155
18	Shishunki (Mio Shirai and Tsukushi)	1	2	150
19	Seishun Midori (Aoi Kizuki and Tsukushi)	1	1	144
19	Frank Sisters (Hiragi Kurumi and Mochi Miyagi)	1	4	144
21	Bad Butts (Ancham and Yappy)	1	2	119
22	Rebel X Enemy (Maika Ozaki and Maya Yukihi)	1	4	114
23	385Myankie's (Jun Kasai and Miyako Matsumoto)	1	1	96
24	Masa Takanashi and Ryu Chounko	1	0	87
25	Parent&Child (Hamuko Hoshi and Ibuki Hoshi)	1	1	86
26	Hikari&Manami † (Hikari Minami and Manami Katsu)	1	0	84+
27	YoneSakura (Emi Sakura and Kaori Yoneyama)	1	2	83
27	Cheerful (Kyuri and Mifu Ashida)	1	0	83
29	Gekokujo Tag (Kyuri and Maika Ozaki)	1	2	78
30	Emi Sakura and Nanae Takahashi	1	6	77
31	Passion Red (Kazumi Shimouma and Nanae Takahashi)	1	0	72
32	Burning Raw (Giulia and Tequila Saya)	1	2	70
33	Emi Sakura and Ray	1	4	67
34	Queen Valkyrie (Ancham and Yuuri)	1	1	58
35	Misa Kagura and Sumika Yanagawa	1	2	57
36	Choun Shiryu and Makoto Oishi	1	0	56
37	Hiragi Kurumi and Hiroyo Matsumoto	1	1	51
38	Chii Tomiya and Isami Kodaka	1	0	47
38	Meat Monsters (Hamuko Hoshi and Hiroyo Matsumoto)	1	1	47
40	Happy Makers (Aoi Kizuki and Sayaka Obihiro)	1	0	43
41	KiraMiku (Kirari Wakana and Miku Kanae)	1	0	42
42	Hikaru Shida and Maki Narumiya	1	2	39
43	galaxyPunch! (Hikari Shimizu and Saki)	1	1	38
44	Nekoka Tag (Leon and Neko Nitta)	1	0	36
45	Miyako Matsumoto and Neko Nitta	1	0	35
46	Cheerful Princess (Arisa Shinose and Misa Kagura)	1	0	28
47	Orange Happies (Aoi Kizuki and Kayoko Haruyama)	1	0	24
48	Jumonji Sisters (DASH Chisako and Sendai Sachiko)	1	0	21
48	Hailey Hatred and Hamuko Hoshi	1	0	21
50	Azumi Hyuga and Ran Yu-Yu	1	0	18
51	Hiroyo Matsumoto and Tsukasa Fujimoto	1	0	16
52	Kyoko Kimura and Sayaka Obihiro	1	0	12
53	Emi Sakura and Makoto	1	1	11
54	Emi Sakura and Tsukushi	1	0	3
55	Gentaro and Mai Ichii	1	0	2

=== By wrestler ===
Rank	Wrestler	No. of reigns	Combined defenses	Combined days
1	Tsukasa Fujimoto	8	21	1,152
2	Tsukushi	10	13	966
3	Risa Sera	5	22	906
4	Makoto	6	12	838
5	Hamuko Hoshi	9	13	814
6	Maya Yukihi	5	18	664
7	Hikaru Shida	5	14	615
8	Hiragi Kurumi/Kurumi	6	9	466
9	Maki Narumiya	2	10	395
10	Mochi Miyagi	4	9	344
11	Arisa Nakajima	1	4	338
12	Nanae Takahashi	3	6	311
13	Tanny Mouse	1	2	303
13	Yuki Miyazaki	1	2	303
15	Ibuki Hoshi	2	2	262
16	Sumika Yanagawa	2	5	245
17	Emi Sakura	5	13	241
18	Misa Kagura	3	2	240
19	Manami Katsu †	2	0	239+
20	Aoi Kizuki	3	1	211
21	Satsuki Totoro	2	2	201
21	Yuna Manase	2	2	201
23	Maika Ozaki	2	6	192
24	Etsuko Mita	1	2	179
25	Ancham	2	3	177
26	Misaki Ohata	1	3	168
26	Ryo Mizunami	1	3	168
28	Minori Makiba	1	0	162
28	Riho	1	1	162
28	Yuki Sato	1	1	162
31	Kyuri	2	2	161
32	Mio Shirai	1	2	150
33	Choun Shiryu	2	0	143
34	Miyako Matsumoto	2	1	131
35	Yappy	1	2	119
36	Hiroyo Matsumoto	3	2	114
37	Jun Kasai	1	1	96
38	Masa Takanashi	1	0	87
39	Hikari Minami †	1	0	84+
40	Kaori Yoneyama	1	2	83
40	Mifu Ashida	1	0	83
42	Kazumi Shimouma	1	0	72
43	Neko Nitta	2	0	71
44	Giulia	1	2	70
44	Tequila Saya	1	2	70
46	Ray	1	4	67
47	Yuuri	1	1	58
48	Makoto Oishi	1	0	56
49	Sayaka Obihiro	2	0	55
50	Chii Tomiya	1	0	47
50	Isami Kodaka	1	0	47
52	Kirari Wakana	1	0	42
52	Miku Kanae	1	0	42
54	Hikari Shimizu	1	1	38
54	Saki	1	1	38
56	Leon	1	0	36
57	Arisa Shinose	1	0	28
58	Kayoko Haruyama	1	0	24
59	DASH Chisako	1	0	21
59	Hailey Hatred	1	0	21
59	Sendai Sachiko	1	0	21
62	Azumi Hyuga	1	0	18
62	Ran Yu-Yu	1	0	18
64	Kyoko Kimura	1	0	12
65	Gentaro	1	0	2
65	Mai Ichii	1	0	2

== See also ==
- Goddesses of Stardom Championship
- JWP Tag Team Championship
- Oz Academy Tag Team Championship
- Reina World Tag Team Championship
- Wave Tag Team Championship
- Women's World Tag Team Championship
