= Kyuri (wrestler) =

Japanese professional wrestler

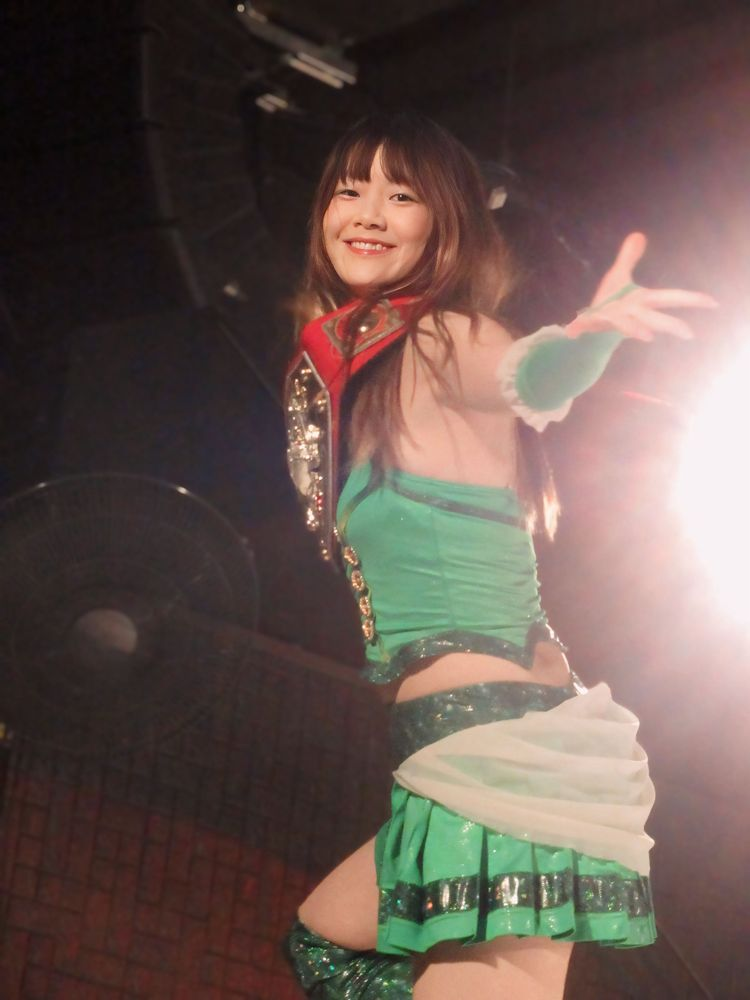
- Kyuri in March 2024

Personal information
- Born: May 28, 1998 (age 28) Tokyo, Japan

Professional wrestling career
- Ring name(s): Kyuri; Kyuuri
- Billed height: 158 cm (5 ft 2 in)
- Billed weight: 48 kg (106 lb)
- Trained by: Hikaru Shida
- Debut: 2012

Ri Yumi (リ・ユミ, Yumi Ri), better known by her ring name Kyuri (弓李, Kyuuri) is a Japanese professional wrestler currently performing the Japanese promotion Ice Ribbon, where she is a former Triangle Ribbon Champion and International Ribbon Tag Team Champion.

== Professional wrestling career ==
=== Ice Ribbon (2012–present) ===
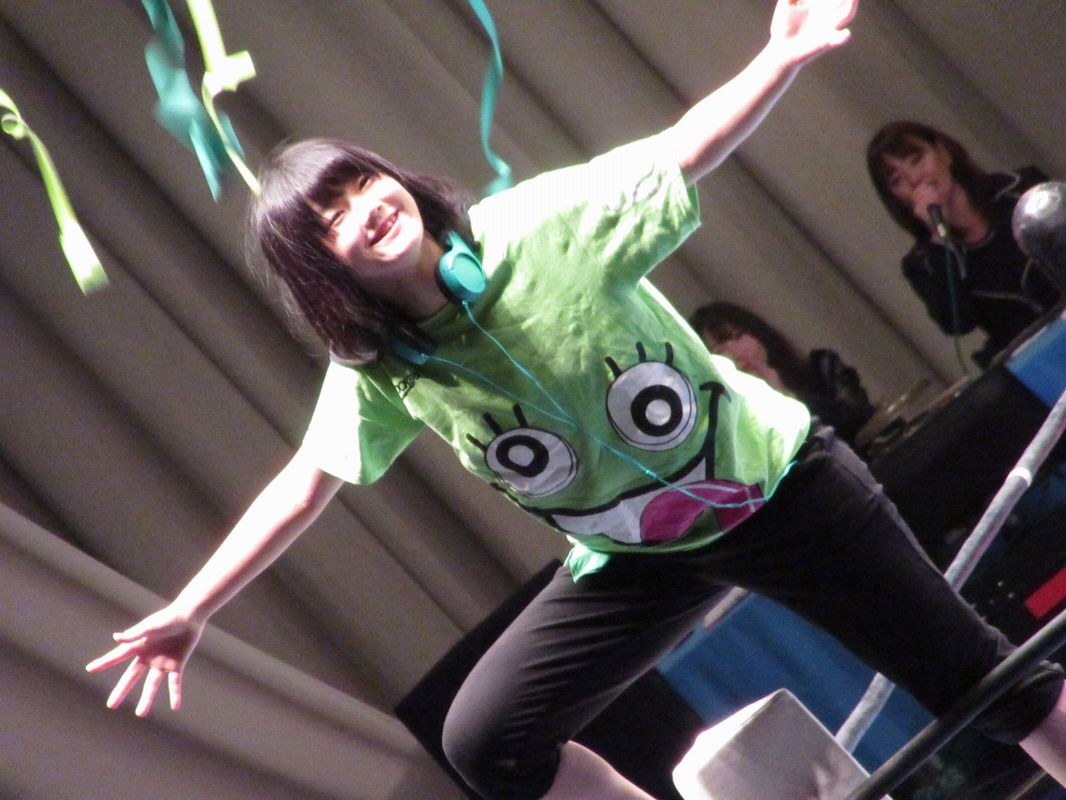
Kyuri in March 2018

Kyuri is best known for her decade-tenure with Ice Ribbon. She made her professional wrestling debut at New Ice Ribbon #424 ~ Start Band III on October 28, 2012, where she teamed up with Miyazaki in a losing effort against Hiromi and Sai as a result of a tag team exhibition match.

During her tenure with the promotion, she chased for various championships promoted by it. She won her first title, the Triangle Ribbon Championship on May 4, 2016, at the 10th Anniversary Show by defeating Cherry. The second ever championship she won was the International Ribbon Tag Team Championship alongside her "Gekokujo Tag" partner Maika Ozaki at "RibbonMania 2018" on December 31, by defeating Lovely Butchers (Hamuko Hoshi and Mochi Miyagi). She also took part in many match gimmicks. At Ice Ribbon New Ice Ribbon #911, she took part in Aoi Kizuki's retirement match, a gauntlet bout which ended up in a draw and also involved Giulia, Tsukasa Fujimoto, Satsuki Totoro, Tsukushi and others. At Osaka Ribbon 2018 III on November 3, Kyuri competed in the first rounds of a number one contendership tournament for the ICE Cross Infinity Championship in which she fell short to Maika Ozaki. At RibbonMania 2019 on December 31, she competed in Tequila Saya's retirement bout, a 44-person gauntlet match which ended in a draw with all competitors tying up with Saya. The match also involved many notable opponents such as Akane Fujita, Banny Oikawa, Hiroe Nagahama, Ibuki Hoshi, Itsuki Aoki, Kaori Yoneyama, Ram Kaicho, Risa Sera, Syuri and many others.

=== Independent scene (2014–present) ===
Due to Ice Ribbon sharing business partnerships with various promotions, Kyuri competed in several companies of the Japanese independent scene. At JWP Youth Infinite Power, an event promoted by JWP Joshi Puroresu on June 25, 2014, she teamed up with Sareee in a losing effort against Sumire Natsu and Yua Hayashi. At Mio Shirai Produce MIO 5 ~ Goodbye Everyone's Sister, an event which portraited the last match of Mio Shirai's career from September 20, 2015, Kyuri competed in a battle royal won by Sonoko Kato and also involving notable opponents, both male and female such as Sagat, Yusuke Kubo, Seiya Morohashi, Mika Iida, Fuma, Miyako Matsumoto, Moeka Haruhi, Rina Yamashita, Ryo Mizunami, Sawako Shimono and others. At Seadlinnng Yokohama Flash! on August 11, 2017, she unsuccessfully faced Takumi Iroha in the first rounds of the "ULTRA U-7 Tournament". At DDT Ganbare Pro Paradise Train 2018, an event promoted by Ganbare Pro-Wrestling on June 17, 2018, she fell short to Harukaze in singles competition. At Marvelous New Year Magical Marvelous, an event promoted by Marvelous That's Women Pro Wrestling on January 6, 2018, she teamed up with her "Mabutachi 2 Manjimanji" stablemates Maruko Nagasaki and Mio Momono alongside La Rosa Negra to defeat Pandita and W-FIX (Chikayo Nagashima, Kaoru and Megumi Yabushita) in a six-woman tag team match.

== Personal life ==
Kyuri planned to retire from professional wrestling at the end of 2021 due to attending college in order to become a nursery teacher. After taking a two-and a half year hiatus, Kyuri returned to professional wrestling on July 31, 2022, at Ice Ribbon Summer Jumbo Ribbon where she fell short to Tae Honma in singles competition and has competed as a part timer ever since.

== Championships and accomplishments ==
- Ice Ribbon
  - International Ribbon Tag Team Championship (2 times) – with Maika Ozaki (1) and Mifu Ashida (1)
  - Triangle Ribbon Championship (2 times)
