= ICE Cross Infinity Championship =

Professional wrestling women's championship

ICE×∞ Championship
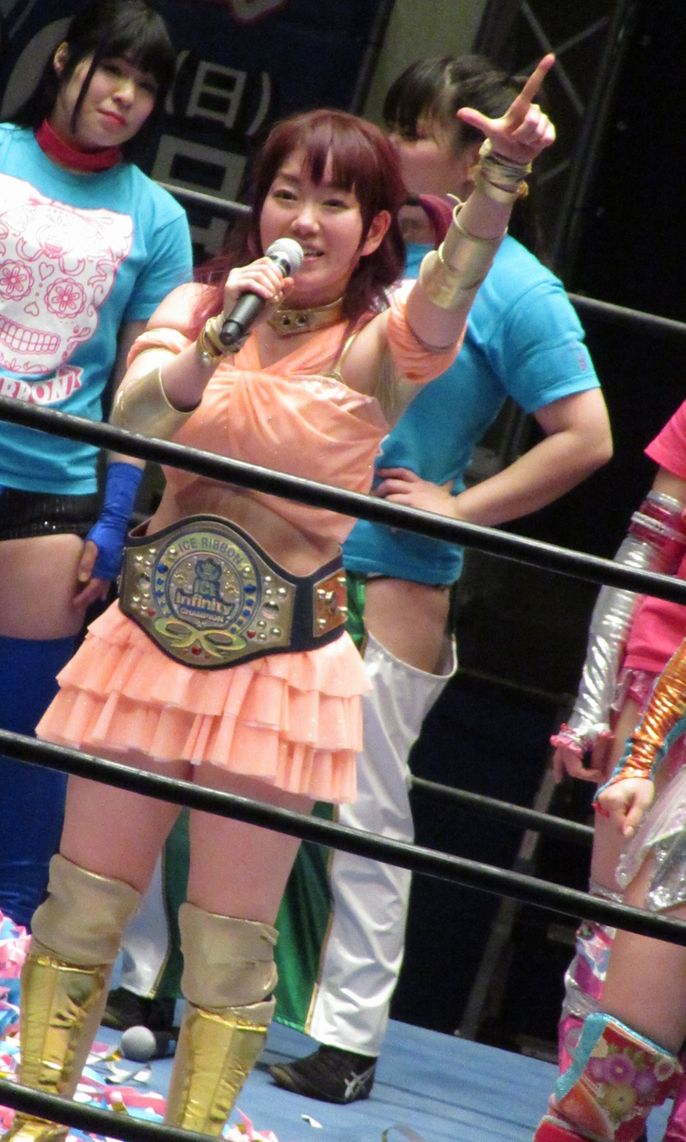
- Miyako Matsumoto with the current version of the title in 2018

Details
- Promotion: Ice Ribbon
- Date established: December 23, 2008
- Current champion: Sumika Yanagawa
- Date won: August 9, 2026

Other names
- ICE×60 Championship (2008 – 2013); ICE×∞ Championship (2013 – present)
Statistics
- First champion: Seina
- Most reigns: Tsukasa Fujimoto (7 reigns)
- Longest reign: Tsukasa Fujimoto (4th reign, 615 days)
- Shortest reign: Maki Narumiya (12 days)
- Oldest champion: Tsukasa Fujimoto (37 years, 177 days)
- Youngest champion: Riho (12 years, 303 days)
- Heaviest champion: Satsuki Totoro (74 kg (163 lb))
- Lightest champion: Tsukushi (44 kg (97 lb))

The Innocent Candies Evolution (ICE)×∞ Championship (Japanese: ICE×∞王座, Hepburn: ICE Kurosu Infiniti Ōza), mainly known as the ICE Cross Infinity Championship is a women's professional wrestling world championship created and promoted by the Ice Ribbon promotion.

== Title history ==
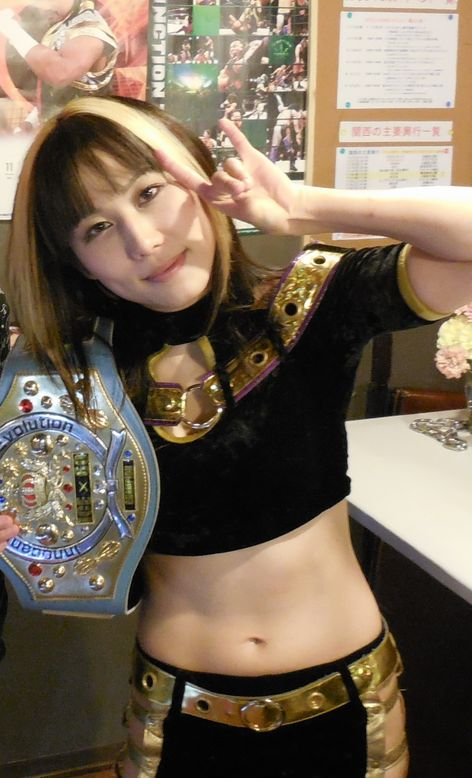
Mio Shirai with the previous title design in November 2012.

The championship, which is situated at the top of Ice Ribbon's championship hierarchy, was introduced as the ICE×60 Championship on December 23, 2008, when Seina defeated Makoto in the finals of a tournament to become the inaugural champion. Seina was the first champion in the title's history. Tsukasa Fujimoto holds the record for most reigns, with seven. Fujimoto also holds the record for the longest reign in the title's history at 615 days, achieved on her fourth reign. Maki Narumiya holds the record for the shortest reign with her only reign lasting 12 days.

The championship's original name referred to its weight limit of 60 kilograms (130 lb), which was abolished in July 2013. To reflect the change, the title was renamed the ICE×∞ (ICE Cross Infinity) Championship on August 12, 2013. Time limits for championship matches were also raised from the original 20 minutes to 30 minutes; in the event of a time limit draw, the title is vacated.

Like most professional wrestling championships, the title is won as a result of a scripted match. There have been a total of thirty-nine reigns shared among twenty-four different wrestlers. Yuki Mashiro is the current champion in her first reign.

=== Vacant title tournament (2022) ===
Tsukushi Haruka vacated the title on May 4, 2022, prior of her retirement from professional wrestling. A tournament to crown a new champion took place between May 28 and June 26, 2022.

Round 1 May 28, June 11
Saori Anou	Pin
Hikari Shimizu	10:41
Sumika Yanagawa	Pin
Amin	8:33
Tae Honma	Sub
Asahi	10:22
Nao Ishikawa	Pin
Satsuki Totoro	13:14
Makoto	Pin
Yuko Sakurai	11:46
Kaho Matsushita	Pin
Yuki Mashiro	12:50
Maika Ozaki	Pin
Saran	9:47
Misa Kagura	Pin
Ibuki Hoshi	9:28

Quarterfinals; June 18
Saori Anou	Pin
Amin	9:54
Tae Honma	Pin
Satsuki Totoro	11:03
Makoto	14:51
Yuki Mashiro	Pin
Maika Ozaki	14:18
Ibuki Hoshi	Pin

Semifinals; June 26
Saori Anou	Pin
Tae Honma	11:38
Yuki Mashiro	Pin
Ibuki Hoshi	10:00

Final; June 26
Saori Anou	Pin
Yuki Mashiro	15:45

== Reigns ==
As of November 22, 2026, there have been a total of 42 reigns between 27 champions and four vacancies. Seina was the inaugural champion. Tsukasa Fujimoto holds the record for most reigns at seven. Fujimoto's four reign is the longest at 615 days. while Maki Narumiya's first and only reign is the shortest at 12 days. Fujimoto is the oldest champion at 37 years old, while Riho is the youngest at 12 years old.

Key
No.	Overall reign number
Reign	Reign number for the specific champion
Days	Number of days held
Defenses	Number of successful defenses
+	Current reign is changing daily

No.	Champion	Championship change			Reign statistics			Notes	Ref.
No.	Champion	Date	Event	Location	Reign	Days	Defenses	Notes	Ref.
1	Seina	December 23, 2008	Ice Ribbon 28	Tokyo, Japan	1	26	0	Seina defeated Makoto in the finals of a six-woman single-elimination tournament to become the inaugural champion.	
2	Kiyoko Ichiki	January 18, 2009	Ice Ribbon 32: Kitazawa Tournament	Tokyo, Japan	1	217	3		
3	Makoto	August 23, 2009	Ice Adventures in Wonderland	Tokyo, Japan	1	50	1		
4	Emi Sakura	October 12, 2009	Ice Ribbon Kitazawa Town Hall Convention	Tokyo, Japan	1	84	10		
5	Tsukasa Fujimoto	January 4, 2010	New Year Ribbon Games	Tokyo, Japan	1	76	3	This match was also the Super Ice Cup 1 tournament final.	
6	Miyako Matsumoto	March 21, 2010	Ice Ribbon 168	Tokyo, Japan	1	13	1		
7	Riho	April 3, 2010	Ice Ribbon 172	Tokyo, Japan	1	30	0		
8	Emi Sakura	May 3, 2010	Ice Ribbon 180: Golden Ribbon	Tokyo, Japan	2	77	2		
9	Hikari Minami	July 19, 2010	Ice Ribbon 202: Itabashi Tournament	Tokyo, Japan	1	66	0		
10	Command Bolshoi	September 23, 2010	Knights of Ice Ribbon	Tokyo, Japan	1	94	2		
11	Tsukasa Fujimoto	December 26, 2010	RibbonMania	Tokyo, Japan	2	238	7		
12	Hikari Minami	August 21, 2011	Ice Adventures in Wonderland	Tokyo, Japan	2	90	3		
13	Tsukasa Fujimoto	November 19, 2011	Ice Ribbon 344	Tokyo, Japan	3	36	0		
14	Hikaru Shida	December 25, 2011	RibbonMania	Tokyo, Japan	1	273	5		
15	Mio Shirai	September 23, 2012	Knights of Ice Ribbon	Tokyo, Japan	1	99	2		
16	Maki Narumiya	December 31, 2012	RibbonMania	Tokyo, Japan	1	12	0		
—	Vacated	January 12, 2013	Ice Ribbon 440	Saitama, Japan	—	—	—	Maki Narumiya vacated the championship after being sidelined with a spinal cord injury.	
17	Tsukushi	February 27, 2013	Ice Ribbon 451	Saitama, Japan	1	137	3	Tsukushi defeated Miyako Matsumoto in the finals of an eight-woman round-robin tournament to win the vacant championship.	
18	Tsukasa Fujimoto	July 14, 2013	Ice Ribbon Shinjuku Tournament	Tokyo, Japan	4	615	11	This match was a championship unification match, also contested for the IW19 Championship. Fujimoto also abolished the title's 60 kg (130 lb) weight limit. Title renamed ICE×∞ Championship on August 12, 2013.	
19	Kurumi	March 21, 2015	Ice Ribbon March	Tokyo, Japan	1	95	2	Kurumi changed her ring name to Hiragi Kurumi on May 4, 2015.	
20	Aoi Kizuki	June 24, 2015	9th Anniversary in Korakuen Hall	Tokyo, Japan	1	190	2		
21	Hamuko Hoshi	December 31, 2015	RibbonMania	Tokyo, Japan	1	81	2		
22	Risa Sera	March 21, 2016	Hiroshima Ribbon	Hiroshima, Japan	1	104	1		
23	Tsukasa Fujimoto	July 3, 2016	Summer Jumbo Ribbon	Tokyo, Japan	5	123	9		
—	Vacated	November 3, 2016	Ice Ribbon 765	Tokyo, Japan	—	—	—	The championship was vacated after Tsukasa Fujimoto's defense against Tsukushi ended in a 30-minute time limit draw.	
24	Risa Sera	December 31, 2016	RibbonMania	Tokyo, Japan	2	365	7	Sera defeated Tsukasa Fujimoto in the finals of a fourteen-woman single-elimination tournament to win the vacant championship.	
25	Hiragi Kurumi	December 31, 2017	RibbonMania	Tokyo, Japan	2	84	1		
26	Miyako Matsumoto	March 25, 2018	Ice Ribbon March	Tokyo, Japan	2	49	2		
27	Hamuko Hoshi	May 13, 2018	Ryogoku KFC Ribbon	Tokyo, Japan	2	34	0		
28	Tsukasa Fujimoto	June 16, 2018	Osaka Ribbon	Osaka, Japan	6	198	3		
29	Maya Yukihi	December 31, 2018	RibbonMania	Tokyo, Japan	1	215	4		
—	Vacated	August 3, 2019	Osaka Ribbon	Osaka, Japan	—	—	—	The championship was vacated after Maya Yukihi's defense against Tsukasa Fujimoto ended in a 30-minute time limit draw.	
30	Maya Yukihi	September 14, 2019	Yokohama Bunka Gymnasium III	Yokohama, Kanagawa, Japan	2	330	6	Yukihi defeated Risa Sera in the finals of a round-robin tournament to win the vacant championship.	
31	Suzu Suzuki	August 9, 2020	Ice Ribbon Yokohama Bunka Gymnasium Final	Yokohama, Kanagawa, Japan	1	167	4		
32	Tsukasa Fujimoto	January 23, 2021	Ice Ribbon 1095 ~ Winter Story	Tokyo, Japan	7	294	9		
33	Tsukushi Haruka	November 13, 2021	Ice Ribbon 1157	Tokyo, Japan	2	172	7	Haruka was previously known simply as Tsukushi.	
—	Vacated	May 4, 2022	Ice Ribbon 1199 ~ Yokohama Budokan II	Tokyo, Japan	—	—	—	The championship was vacated after Haruka retired from professional wrestling.	
34	Saori Anou	June 26, 2022	After the rain Ribbon 2022	Tokyo, Japan	1	266	5	Defeated Yuki Mashiro in a tournament final to win the vacant title.	
35	Satsuki Totoro	March 19, 2023	Ice Ribbon 1267	Tokyo, Japan	1	120	3		
36	Yuuri	July 17, 2023	Ice Ribbon 1289 ~ Yokohama Ribbon 2023 July	Tokyo, Japan	1	40	1		
37	Ibuki Hoshi	August 26, 2023	Ice Ribbon 1297 ~ Ice in Wonderland 2023	Tokyo, Japan	1	224	3		
—	Vacated	April 6, 2024	Ice Ribbon Kamata	Tokyo, Japan	—	—	—	The championship was vacated due to Hoshi going on hiatus because of her pregnancy.	
38	Yuuri	June 23, 2024	Ice Ribbon 1354 ~ After The Rain, Ribbon 2024	Tokyo, Japan	2	118	1	Defeated Hamuko Hoshi in the finals of a league to win the vacant title.	
39	Yuki Mashiro	October 19, 2024	Ice Ribbon 1376 ~ Oktober Iceribbon Fest 2024	Tokyo, Japan	1	86	1		
40	Manami Katsu	January 13, 2025	Ice Ribbon 1394	Tokyo, Japan	1	352	7		
—	Vacated	December 31, 2025	RibbonMania	Tokyo, Japan	—	—	—	Katsu vacated the title due to illness.	
41	Kaho Matsushita	December 31, 2025	RibbonMania	Tokyo, Japan	1	221	3	Defeated Kirari Wakana and Yuuka in a three-way match to win the vacant title.	
42	Sumika Yanagawa	August 9, 2026	Ice Ribbon 1507	Tokyo, Japan	1	105+	2		

== Combined reigns ==
As of November 22, 2026.

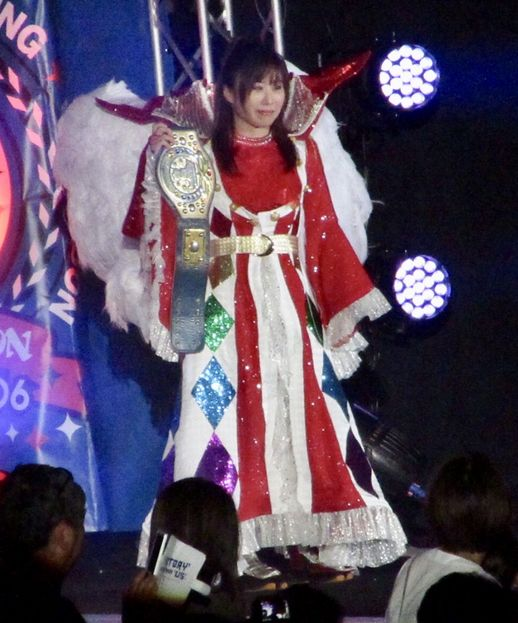
Tsukasa Fujimoto, record seven-time champion, who also holds the record for the most defenses at 42, and longest combined reigning days at 1,580.

†	Indicates the current champion

Rank	Wrestler	No. of reigns	Combined defenses	Combined days
1	Tsukasa Fujimoto	7	42	1,580
2	Maya Yukihi	2	10	545
3	Risa Sera	2	8	469
4	Manami Katsu	1	7	352
5	Tsukushi/Tsukushi Haruka	2	10	309
6	Hikaru Shida	1	5	273
7	Saori Anou	1	5	266
8	Kaho Matsushita	1	3	221
9	Ibuki Hoshi	1	3	224
10	Kiyoko Ichiki	1	3	217
11	Aoi Kizuki	1	2	190
12	Hiragi Kurumi/Kurumi	2	3	179
13	Suzu Suzuki	1	4	167
14	Emi Sakura	2	12	161
15	Yuuri	2	2	158
16	Hikari Minami	2	3	156
17	Satsuki Totoro	1	3	120
18	Hamuko Hoshi	2	2	115
19	Sumika Yanagawa †	1	2	105+
20	Mio Shirai	1	2	99
21	Command Bolshoi	1	2	94
22	Yuki Mashiro	1	1	86
23	Miyako Matsumoto	2	3	62
24	Makoto	1	1	50
25	Riho	1	0	30
26	Seina	1	0	26
27	Maki Narumiya	1	0	12

== See also ==
- Triangle Ribbon Championship
- International Ribbon Tag Team Championship
