= Satsuki Totoro =

Japanese professional wrestler

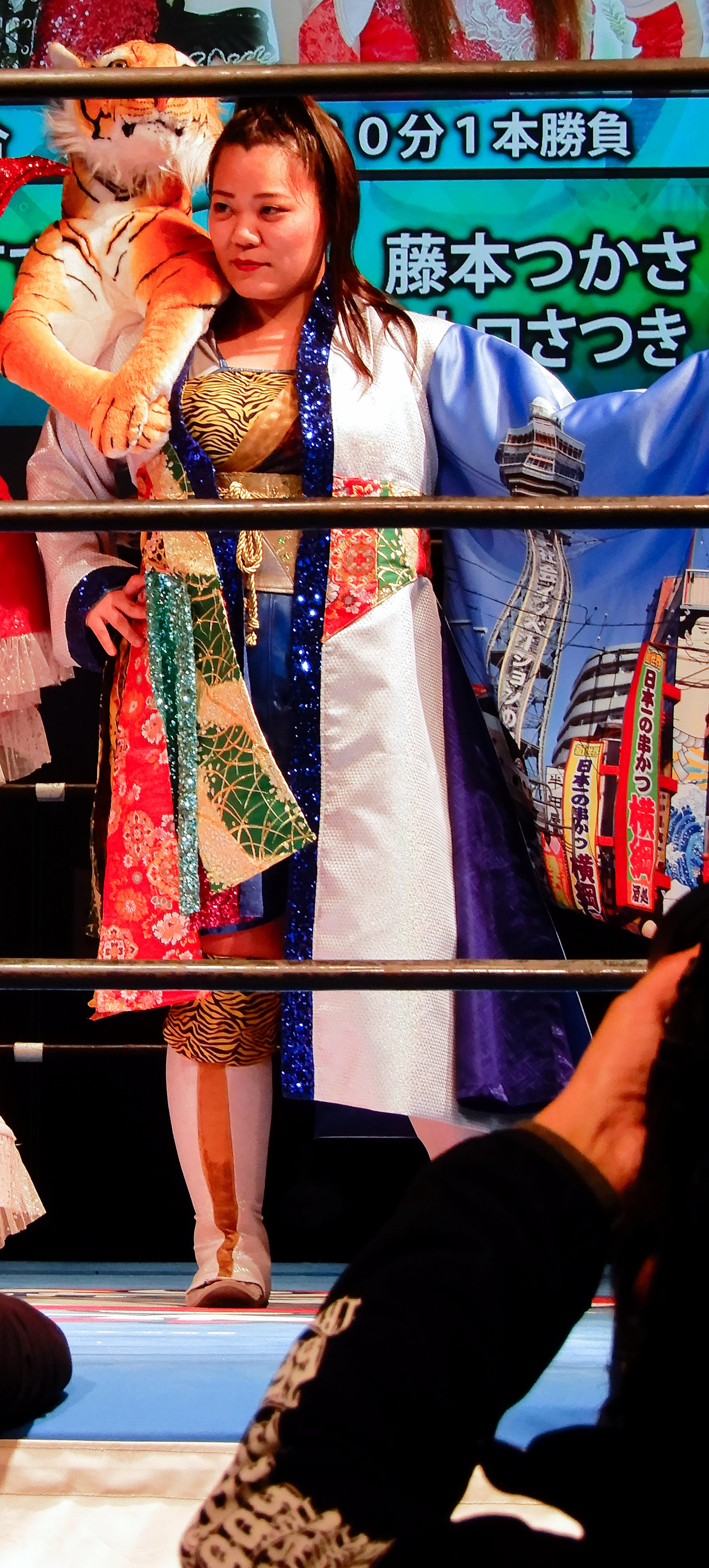
- Totoro in January 2021

Personal information
- Born: 11 May 1989 (age 37) Osaka, Japan

Professional wrestling career
- Ring name(s): Satsuki Totoro; Shigure
- Billed height: 161 cm (5 ft 3 in)
- Billed weight: 74 kg (163 lb)
- Debut: 2017

Satsuki Totoro (トトロさつき, Totoro Satsuki) is a Japanese professional wrestler currently working as a freelancer best known for her tenure with the Japanese promotions Actwres girl'Z and Ice Ribbon.

== Professional wrestling career ==
=== Independent circuit (2017–present) ===
As a freelancer, Totoro is known for competing in multiple promotions of the Japanese independent scene. At a house show promoted by Pure-J on 8 November 2017, she unsuccessfully faced Kazuki. At Seadlinnng Shin-Kiba 1st NIGHT on 22 November 2017, she teamed up with Nanae Takahashi and Rina Yamashita as the captain of their respective team, falling short against Ayako Hamada, Mio Momono and Saki Akai as a result of a captain's fall tag team match. At Oz Academy Plum Hanasaku 2019 ~ OZ No Kuni YOKOHAMA Shining on 25 August 2019, she teamed up with Tsubasa Kuragaki to defeat Chihiro Hashimoto and Himeka Arita.

Totoro often wrestled in men's promotions as a joshi talent. At K-DOJO Club-K Super In TKP Garden City Chiba, an event promoted by Kaientai Dojo on 16 July 2017, she teamed up with Mochi Miyagi in a losing effort against Bambi and Erina. At DDT Ganbare Pro Yumehito Imanari Produce - Ganbare Prime, an event promoted by Ganbare Pro-Wrestling on 10 January 2022, she unsuccessfully faced Yuna Manase.

=== Ice Ribbon (2017–present) ===
Totoro is best known for competing in Ice Ribbon. She made her professional wrestling debut at Ice Ribbon Sozei Pro Vol. 2 on 4 March 2017, under the name of Shigure where she wrestled Maruko Nagasaki into a time-limit draw as a result of an exhibition match. At New Ice Ribbon #841 on 9 October 2017, she teamed up with Nao Date to unsuccessfully face Hamuko Hoshi and Mochi Miyagi in the semi-finals of a tournament for the International Ribbon Tag Team Championship. At New Ice Ribbon #977 on 14 August 2019, she teamed up with Rina Yamashita, Suzu Suzuki and Thekla in a losing effort against Giulia, Hamuko Hoshi, Hiragi Kurumi, Miyako Matsumoto and Ram Kaicho in a five-on-four handicap match. At New Ice Ribbon #1013 RibbonMania on 31 December, she participated in Tequila Saya's retirement bout, a 44-person gauntlet match also involving notable opponents such as Tsukushi Haruka, Ram Kaicho, Syuri, Tae Honma, Matsuya Uno, Ken Ohka, Maika Ozaki, Momo Kohgo, Nao Ishikawa and many others.

At New Ice Ribbon #1019 on 18 January 2020, an event which featured luchadoras from Consejo Mundial De Lucha Libre, Totoro teamed up with La Jarochita in a losing effort against Dalys la Caribeña and Yappy. At Ice Ribbon Vs. Shinjuku 2-chome, an event produced in partnership with Wrestling of Darkness 666 on 8 November, Totoro competed in a 18-man battle royal won by Asukama and also involving Hiragi Kurumi, Risa Sera, Suzu Suzuki, Tsukushi Haruka, Akane Fujita and others. On the same night she teamed up with Chun Li Shinobu in a losing effort against Masashi Takeda and Mochi Miyagi as a result of a intergender tag team match. At New Ice Ribbon #1121 on 23 May 2021, she unsuccessfully challenged Tsukasa Fujimoto for the ICE Cross Infinity Championship. At New Ice Ribbon #1142 on 28 August, she unsuccessfully challenged Hamuko Hoshi for the IW19 Championship. On 4 May 2022 at Ice Ribbon Yokohama Budokan II, Totoro teamed with Yuna Manase (under the name Big Dekai), and defeated galaxyPunch! (Hikari Shimizu and Saki) to win the International Ribbon Tag Team Championship. On 31 July at Summer Jumbo Ribbon 2022, they lost the tag titles to Makoto and Hoshi.

On 19 March 2023, Totoro defeated Saori Anou to win the ICE Cross Infinity Championship for the first time. She made her first successful title defense against Ibuki Hoshi at New Ice Ribbon #1274 ~ Osaka Ribbon 2023 on 29 April. On 17 July, at New Ice Ribbon 1289 ~ Yokohama Ribbon 2023, she dropped the title to Yuuri, ending her reign at 120 days.

=== Pro Wrestling Wave (2017–2018) ===
Another promotion for which Totoro briefly worked is Pro Wrestling Wave. She made her first appearance at WAVE 10th Anniversary on 12 August 2017 where she teamed up with Chihiro Hashimoto and Takumi Iroha in a losing effort against Ayako Hamada, Meiko Satomura and Nanae Takahashi as a result of a six-man tag team match. At WAVE Sunday WAVE Vol. 34 on 5 November 2017, she unsuccessfully challenged Rina Yamashita in the quarter-finals of a no. 1 contendership tournament for the Wave Singles Championship.

== Championships and accomplishments ==
- Ice Ribbon
  - ICE Cross Infinity Championship (1 time)
  - Triangle Ribbon Championship (1 time)
  - International Ribbon Tag Team Championship (2 times) – with Yuna Manase
  - Fifth Triple Crown Champion
- Pro Wrestling Illustrated
  - Ranked No. 204 of the top 250 female singles wrestlers in the PWI Women's 250 in 2023
