= Asahi (wrestler) =

Japanese professional wrestler (2002–2024)

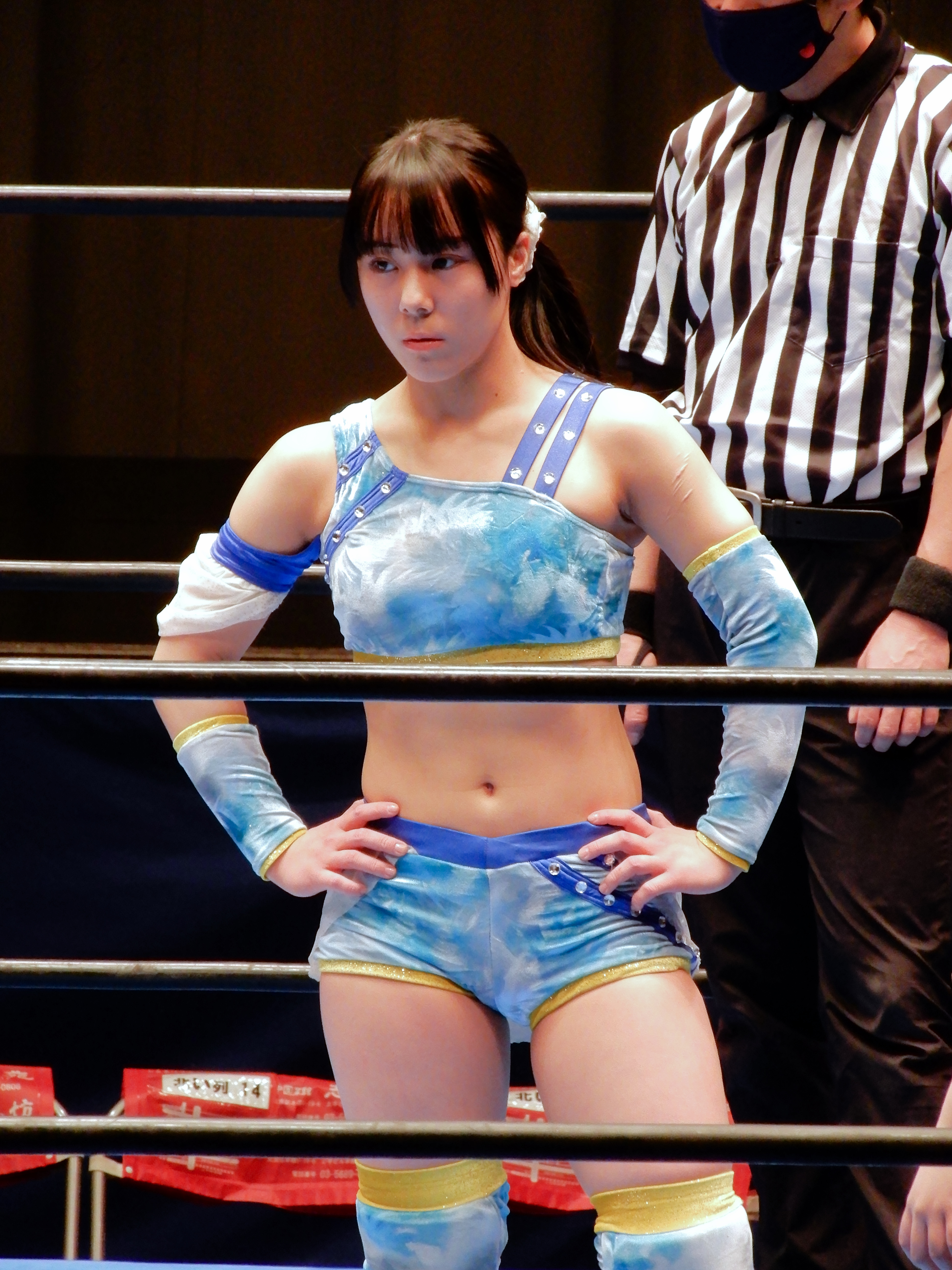
- Asahi in February 2022

Personal information
- Born: October 19, 2002 Gunma Prefecture, Japan
- Died: February 1, 2024 (aged 21) Japan

Professional wrestling career
- Ring name: Asahi
- Billed height: 4 ft 11 in (150 cm)
- Billed weight: 106 lb (48 kg)
- Billed from: Gunma Prefecture, Japan
- Trained by: Maruko Nagasaki
- Debut: 2017
- Retired: 2023

Asahi (October 19, 2002 – February 1, 2024) was a Japanese professional wrestler, best known for her tenure with Ice Ribbon and Actwres girl'Z, as well as the Joshi puroresu circuit in Japan. She made her debut for Ice Ribbon at the age of 14, at Korakuen Hall.

Asahi died at the age of 21 suddenly on February 1, 2024, in an apparent car crash. Actwres girl'Z made the official announcement of her death on February 5, and cancelled a show scheduled for later that week on February 9. The rescheduled event on February 25 featured a tribute video to Asahi to close the show, which contained highlights from both her Ice Ribbon and Actwres girl'Z career.
