= Ibuki Hoshi =

Japanese professional wrestler

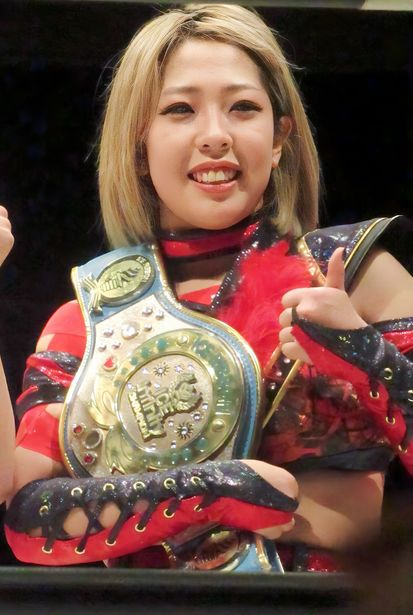
- Hoshi in 2024

Personal information
- Born: April 2003 Iwamizawa, Japan
- Children: 1
- Family: Hamuko Hoshi (mother)

Professional wrestling career
- Ring name: Ibuki Hoshi
- Billed height: 156 cm (5 ft 1 in)
- Billed weight: 52 kg (115 lb)
- Trained by: Hamuko Hoshi
- Debut: 2017

Ibuki Hoshi (星いぶき, Hoshi Ibuki) is a Japanese professional wrestler currently working in the Japanese promotion Ice Ribbon where she is a one-time ICE Cross Infinity Champion. She is a former International Ribbon Tag Team Champion. She is currently inactive, due to maternity leave.

== Professional wrestling career ==
=== Ice Ribbon (2017–present) ===
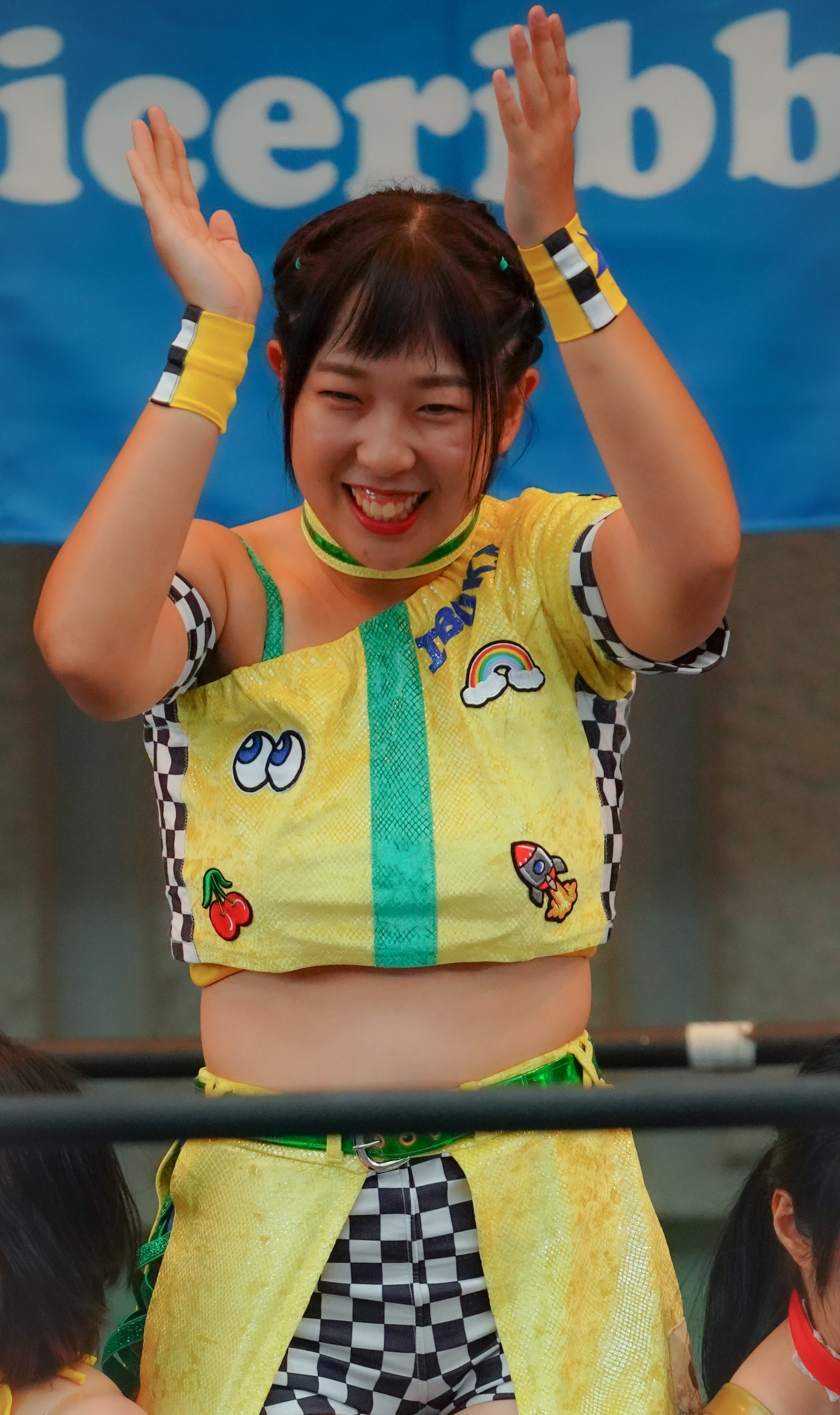
Hoshi in 2019

Hoshi is best known for her time in Ice Ribbon. A home-grown talent, she made her professional wrestling debut in Ice Ribbon at New Ice Ribbon #809 on June 11, 2017, where she teamed up with Hamuko Hoshi to unsuccessfully challenge Hiragi Kurumi and Tsukushi for the vacant International Ribbon Tag Team Championship. She soon started pursuing for other various championships promoted by the company. At Ice Ribbon New Ice Ribbon #879 on April 21, 2018, she unsuccessfully challenged Miyako Matsumoto for the ICE Cross Infinity Championship. At Ice Ribbon New Ice Ribbon #1048 on June 27, 2020, she unsuccessfully challenged Hamuko Hoshi for the IW19 Championship. At RibbonMania 2019 on December 31, Hoshi participated in Tequila Saya's retirement match, a 44-person gauntlet match also involving notable opponents such as Akane Fujita, Suzu Suzuki, Tae Honma, Satsuki Totoro, Rina Shingaki, Yuki Mashiro, Manami Toyota, Kaori Yoneyama, Syuri, Momo Kohgo and others. At New Ice Ribbon #1106 on March 27, 2021, she unsuccessfully challenged Matsuya Uno and Ram Kaicho in a three-way match for the Triangle Ribbon Championship. Hoshi has won the first championship of her career at Ribbonmania 2021 on December 31, the International Ribbon Tag Team Championship which she won alongside Hamuko Hoshi by defeating Azure Revolution (Maya Yukihi and Risa Sera). Before taking a break from professional wrestling in the first half of 2022, Tsukasa Fujimoto chose Hoshi as one of her last tag team partners before eventually starting her hiatus. At Ice Ribbon 1297 ~ Ice In Wonderland 2023 on August 26, 2023, Hoshi defeated Yuuri to win the ICE Cross Infinity Championship for the first time. At Ice Ribbon Kamata on April 6, 2024, Hoshi announced that she will be going on hiatus after revealing she was pregnant, vacating the title in the process.

=== Independent circuit (2018–present) ===
As part freelancer, Hoshi is known for her tenures with various promotions from the Japanese independent scene. At OZ Academy Flower Bloom In Yokohama, an event promoted by Oz Academy on September 17, 2018, she teamed up with Hamuko Hoshi and fell short to Aoi Kizuki and Tsubasa Kuragaki. She competed in Pro Wrestling Wave's Catch the Wave tournament, making her first appearance at the 2019 edition where she fought in the "Young Block", scoring a total of two points after competing against Hiro'e, Haruka Umesaki and Maria. At WAVE Sapporo WAVE ~NA MA RA 7 on September 15, 2019, Hoshi teamed up with Hamuko Hoshi and unsuccessfully challenged Yuki Miyazaki and Sakura Hirota for the Wave Tag Team Championship. At ZERO1 Yokohama Pro Wrestling Festival, an event promoted by Pro Wrestling Zero1 on May 4, 2019, she teamed up with Himeka Arita and Giulia to defeat Shoki Kitamura, and Amazon.

== Personal life ==
Ibuki's mother is fellow professional wrestler Hamuko Hoshi. Hoshi also cited Hikaru Shida as one of her inspirations in wrestling. On April 6, 2024, Ibuki announced her pregnancy and will be taking a hiatus from wrestling, relinquishing the ICExInfinity Championship in the process.

== Championships and accomplishments ==
- Ice Ribbon
  - ICE×∞ Championship (1 time)
  - International Ribbon Tag Team Championship (2 times) – with Hamuko Hoshi (1) and Hikaru Shida) (1)
  - 2nd Kizuna Tournament (2020)
- Pro Wrestling Illustrated
  - Ranked No. 172 of the top 250 female singles wrestlers in the PWI Women's 250 in 2023
