= Miyako Matsumoto =

Japanese professional wrestler and actress

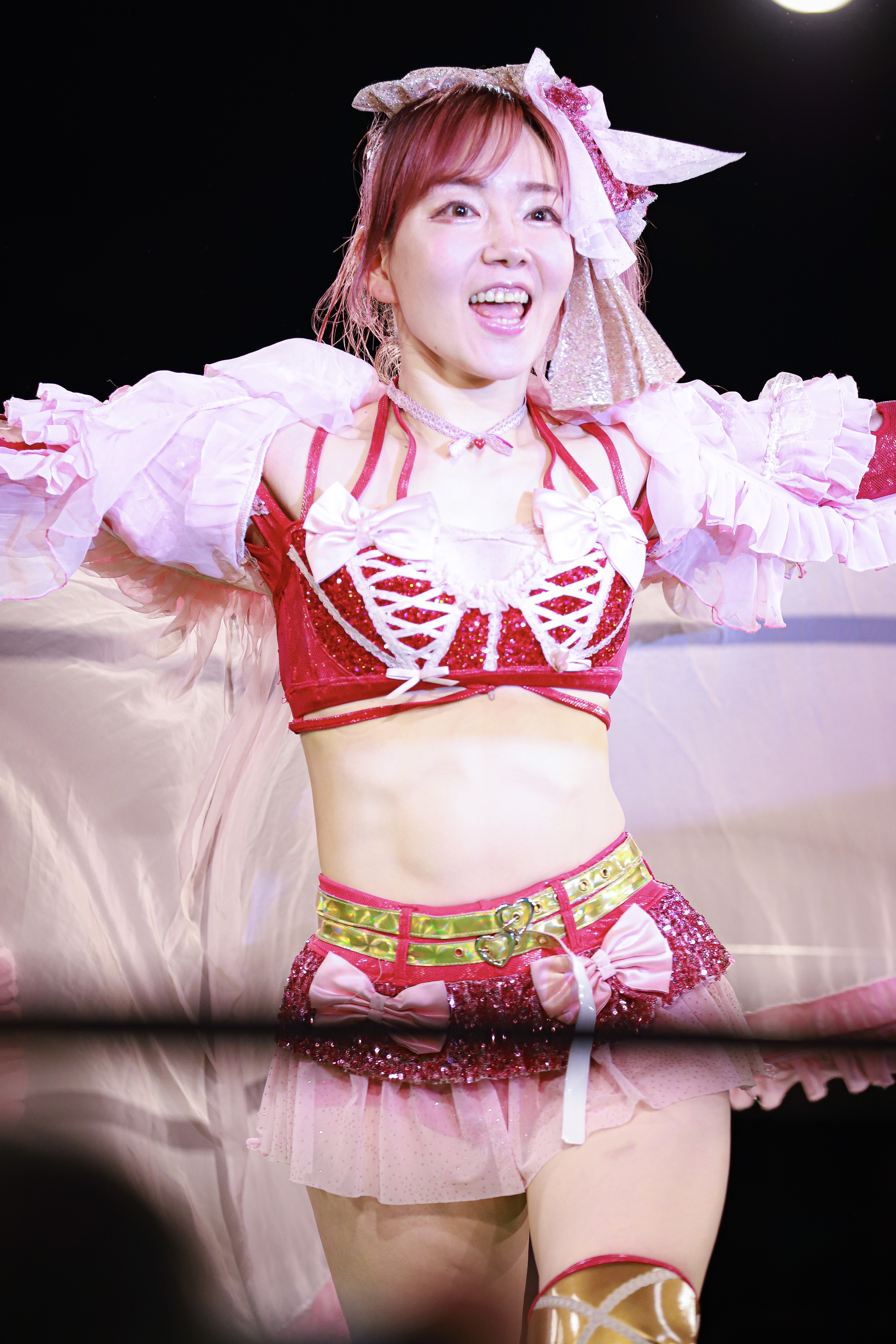
- Matsumoto in April 2023

Personal information
- Born: Miyako Matsumoto; April 11, 1985 (age 41) Tokyo, Japan

Professional wrestling career
- Ring name(s): Cure Gake no Fuchi Black; Daemon Miyako; Fighting Matsumoto; Miyako; Miyako Matsumoto
- Billed height: 1.58 m (5 ft 2 in)
- Billed weight: 47 kg (104 lb)
- Trained by: Emi Sakura
- Debut: July 29, 2008

Miyako Matsumoto (松本 都, Matsumoto Miyako; born April 11, 1985) is a Japanese professional wrestler and actress. She is best known for her work in the Ice Ribbon promotion, where she is a former two-time ICE×60, three-time Triangle Ribbon Champion and a two-time International Ribbon Tag Team Champion, making her the promotion's second Triple Crown Champion. She also wrestles regularly for Oz Academy and Reina Joshi Puroresu and has also promoted her own shows under the Gake no Fuchi Puroresu banner.

== Early life ==
After graduating from Nihon University's College of Art, Matsumoto embarked on a career as an actress, most notably working on the television series Muscle Venus, forming an idol group with fellow cast members Hikaru Shida, Hina Kozuki, Ichiko Mayu, Sachiko Koga, Tomoyo Morihisa, Tsukasa Fujimoto, Yuki Ueda and Yuri Natsume. In 2008, the Muscle Venus group, excluding Kozuki and Natsume, was cast in a film titled Three Count, set in the world of professional wrestling and also starring veteran professional wrestlers Emi Sakura, Kyoko Inoue and Yoshiko Tamura. As part of their roles, all members began training professional wrestling under Sakura.

== Professional wrestling career ==
=== Ice Ribbon (2008–present) ===
Matsumoto made her debut for Emi Sakura's Ice Ribbon promotion on July 29, 2008, wrestling Yuki Ueda to a three-minute time limit draw. Though all Muscle Venus members made their debuts around the same time, only Matsumoto, Hikaru Shida and Tsukasa Fujimoto lasted more than six months, making new careers out of professional wrestling. Matsumoto's wrestling character included her wearing different cosplay outfits, dancing in the middle of matches, intentionally botching spots and other comedic behaviour. Matsumoto gained her first victory on December 13, defeating Chii Tomiya. The following month, despite her unimpressive win–loss record, Matsumoto declared herself the "ace" of all professional wrestling, before unsuccessfully challenging Kiyoko Ichiki for Ice Ribbon's top title, the ICE×60 Championship. The following summer, Matsumoto started a storyline rivalry with International Wrestling Association of Japan manager Haru Miyako, which led to her bringing her associates to face Matsumoto sporadically for the next two years. On December 31, 2009, Matsumoto made her debut for NEO Japan Ladies Pro-Wrestling in a three-way match to determine the "number one Matsumoto". The match, which also included Dump Matsumoto, was won by Hiroyo Matsumoto; none of the three are related to each other.

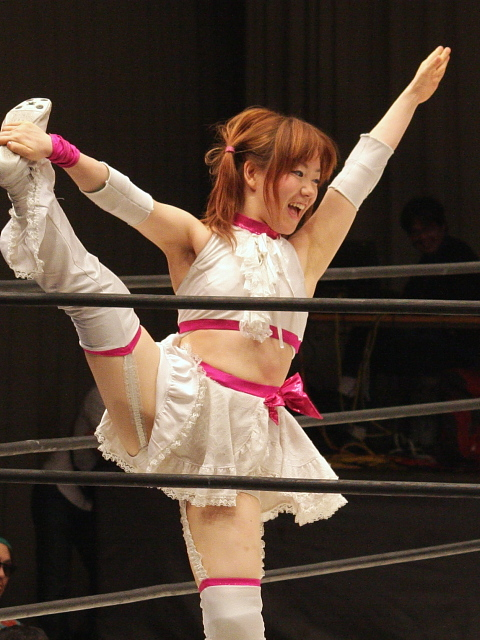
Matsumoto in August 2010

On March 21, 2010, Matsumoto won her first championship, when she scored an upset victory over Tsukasa Fujimoto to become the new ICE×60 Champion. The following day, Matsumoto defeated defending champion Riho and Kazumi Shimouma in a three-way match to also become the new Triangle Ribbon Champion. After a successful ICE×60 Championship defense against Makoto on March 27, Matsumoto's luck started to change, when she first was defeated in a DDT Pro-Wrestling Extreme Division Championship match by Gentaro on March 31, then lost the ICE×60 Championship to Riho on April 3, and finally also lost the Triangle Ribbon Championship to Nanae Takahashi on April 17. As Matsumoto was left weeping in the ring, she was approached by deathmatch wrestler Jun Kasai, whom she had earlier surprisingly declared as her favorite wrestler, who then proceeded to suggest that the two should go for the International Ribbon Tag Team Championship together. On May 3, Matsumoto and Kasai, dubbed "385Myankie's", defeated the defending champions Passion Red (Nanae Takahashi and Kazumi Shimouna) and the team of Gentaro and Keita Yano in a three-way hardcore match to win the International Ribbon Tag Team Championship. With the win, Matsumoto became Ice Ribbon second Triple Crown Champion, after Riho. Afterwards, Matsumoto began feuding with Chii Tomiya. On July 19, Matsumoto and Kasai made their first successful title defense against the team of Tomiya and Command Bolshoi. On August 7, Matsumoto and Kasai lost the International Ribbon Tag Team Championship to Tomiya and Isami Kodaka in their second defense. On September 23, Matsumoto, Kasai and Jaki Numazawa unsuccessfully challenged The Great Kojika, Mr. #6 and Riho for the DDT Jiyugaoka Six-Person Tag Team, DDT Nihonkai Six-Man Tag Team and UWA World Trios Championships. As Kasai was not a regular member of Ice Ribbon's roster and only made sporadic appearances for the promotion, Matsumoto went on to join Hikaru Shida, Mochi Miyagi and Tsukasa Fujimoto to form the "Ichinisanshidan" stable. On November 23, Matsumoto and Shida unsuccessfully challenged Emi Sakura and Nanae Takahashi for the International Ribbon Tag Team Championship. Meanwhile, Matsumoto continued her rivalry with Chii Tomiya, now a member of rival stable Heisei YTR, building to a hardcore match on March 21, 2011, where Matsumoto and Jun Kasai defeated Tomiya and Kazuhiko Ogasawara. After a losing streak, which included several losses against rookie Maki Narumiya, Matsumoto was defeated on May 11 by Emi Sakura 11–0 in a twenty-minute Iron Man match, which led to Sakura telling her to start improving her game. This led to Matsumoto challenging ICE×60 Champion Tsukasa Fujimoto to a title match, where she offered to put her Ice Ribbon career on the line. On May 25, Matsumoto failed in her title match against Fujimoto and, as a result, left Ice Ribbon.

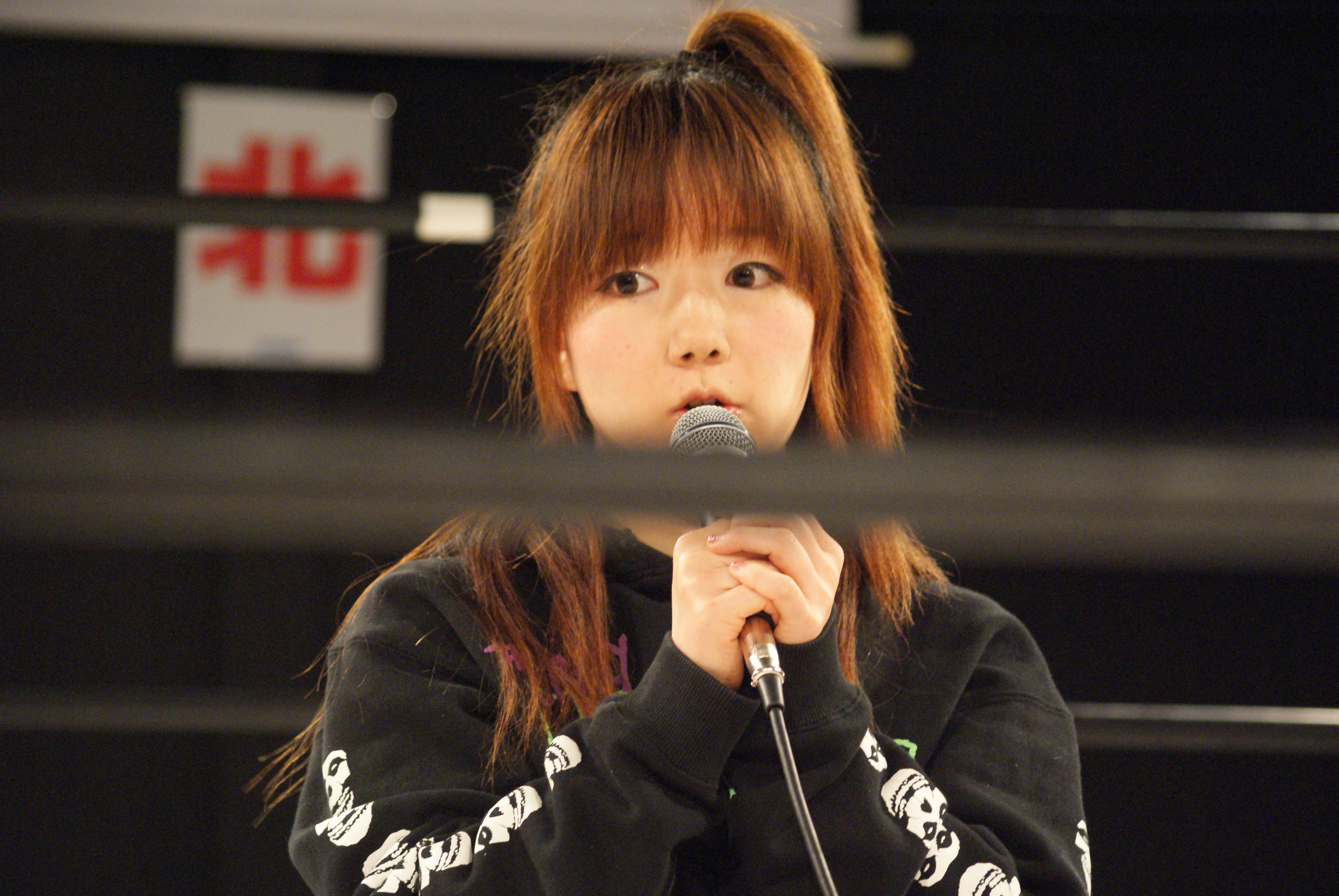
Matsumoto in January 2012

Matsumoto then went on to form her own Gake no Fuchi Puroresu (崖のふちプロレス, Gake no Fuchi Puroresu; "Edge of the Cliff Pro Wrestling", GakePro) promotion. GakePro's events have featured appearances from Ice Ribbon wrestlers like Emi Sakura, Makoto, and Tsukasa Fujimoto, as well as well known male wrestlers like Great Sasuke, Munenori Sawa, and Tsuyoshi Kikuchi. On December 3, Matsumoto returned to Ice Ribbon, in storyline being brought back by Ken Ohka to attack his estranged tag team partner Hikari Minami. The following day, Matsumoto and Ohka defeated Minami and Makoto Oishi in a tag team match. On December 25 at RibbonMania, the reunited Matsumoto and Jun Kasai were defeated by Danshoku Dino and Makoto Oishi in a three-way tag team match, which also included Hikari Minami and Ken Ohka. Matsumoto then began chasing the Triangle Ribbon Championship, held by male wrestler Ribbon Takanashi. On January 4, 2012, Takanashi defeated Matsumoto and Yasu Urano to retain his title. In another title match on January 25, Matsumoto was pinned by Neko Nitta, who, as a result, became the new Triangle Ribbon Champion. Afterwards, Matsumoto demanded another shot at the Triangle Ribbon Championship and announced that since Nitta had used her cat-like attributes to defeat her, she was going to bring another animal, "Crazy Monkey" Jun Kasai, as the second challenger for the title match. On February 5 at Yokohama Ribbon, Matsumoto defeated Nitta and Kasai to win the Triangle Ribbon Championship for the second time. She would go on to lose the title to Ladies Legend Pro-Wrestling (LLPW-X) representative Eiger on February 29, in a three-way match, which also included Neko Nitta. Through their rivalry over the Triangle Ribbon Championship, Matsumoto and Neko Nitta eventually formed a tag team and on July 15, defeated Dropkickers (Tsukasa Fujimoto and Tsukushi) to become the new International Ribbon Tag Team Champions. Matsumoto and Nitta lost the title to Kurumi and Tsukushi in their first defense on August 19, during an event celebrating Matsumoto's, Hikaru Shida's and Tsukasa Fujimoto's fourth anniversary in professional wrestling.

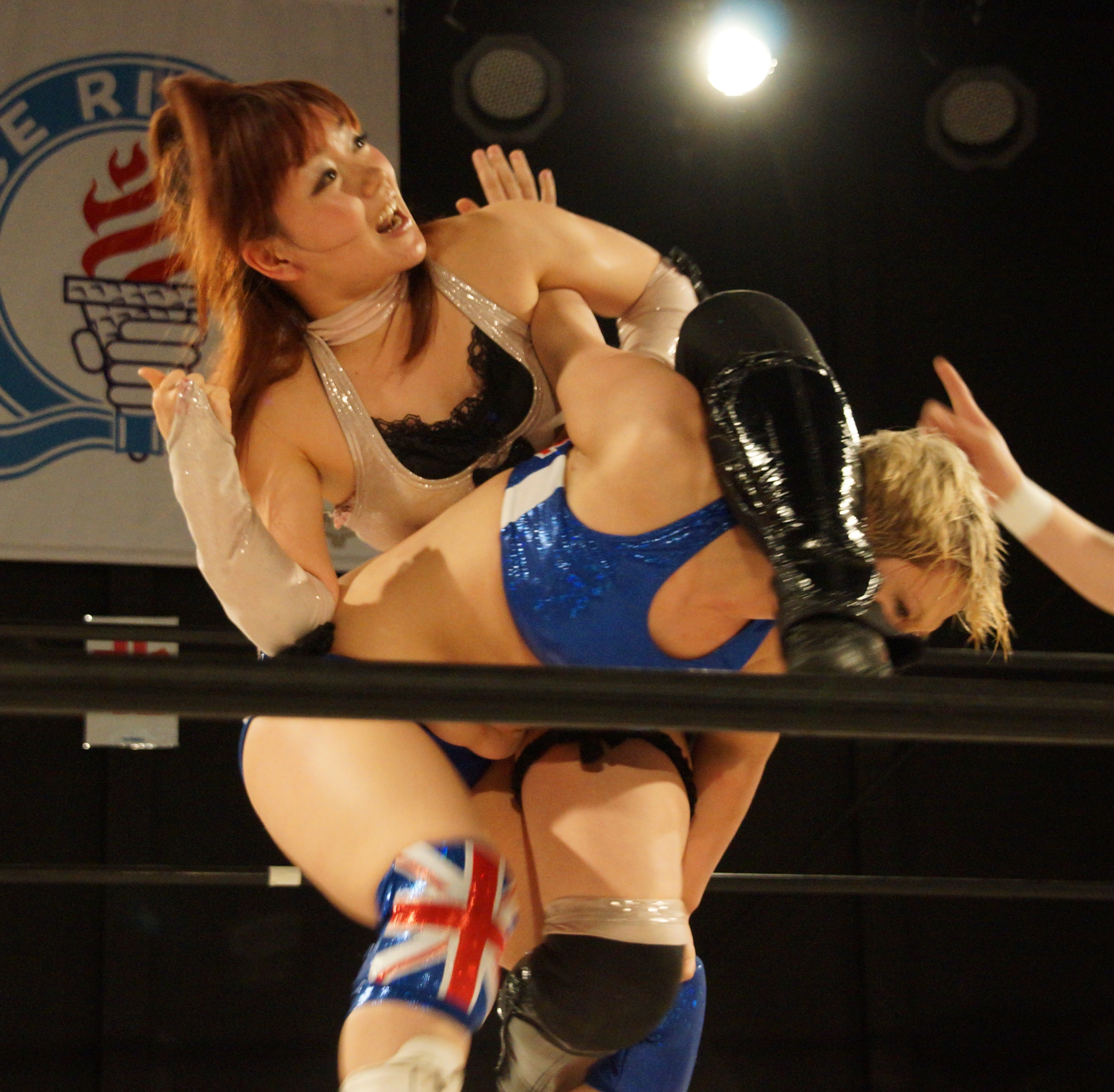
Matsumoto applying an octopus hold on April Davids

After the ICE×60 Championship was vacated, following Maki Narumiya being sidelined with an injury, Matsumoto entered a round-robin tournament to determine the new champion, wrestling Hamuko Hoshi to a ten-minute time limit draw in her opening match on January 19, 2013. On January 26, Matsumoto entered another tournament, contested for the also vacant Triangle Ribbon Championship, defeating Gabai-Ji-chan and Hailey Hatred in her first round match. On February 2, Matsumoto lost to Tsukasa Fujimoto in her second match in the ICE×60 Championship tournament. On February 11, Matsumoto defeated Fujimoto and Mio Shirai in a tournament final to win the vacant Triangle Ribbon Championship for the third time. On February 13, Matsumoto finished the round-robin portion of the ICE×60 Championship tournament with a win over Kurumi, forcing a tiebreaker match with Hamuko Hoshi to decide who would advance to the semifinals. Three days later, Matsumoto advanced to the semifinals of the tournament with a win over Hoshi. On February 23, Matsumoto defeated Hikaru Shida in her semifinal match to advance to the finals of the tournament. Four days later, she was defeated in the finals of the tournament by Tsukushi. On March 9, Matsumoto made her first successful defense of the Triangle Ribbon Championship against Kyusei Sakura Hirota and Neko Nitta. On March 31, Matsumoto took part in a big intergender match, where she was defeated by Minoru Suzuki. Afterwards, she challenged Suzuki to a rematch under Gake no Fuchi rules. Suzuki was also victorious in the rematch, which took place at a GakoPro event on May 4. Following the match, Matsumoto originally announced that in the future she would be wrestling under the ring name "Miyako gdgd Matsumoto" (松本ｇｄｇｄ都, Matsumoto gudaguda Miyako), but before wrestling a single match under her new name, decided not to go through with the name change. On May 25, Matsumoto lost the Triangle Ribbon Championship to Neko Nitta in a three-way match, which also included Kurumi.

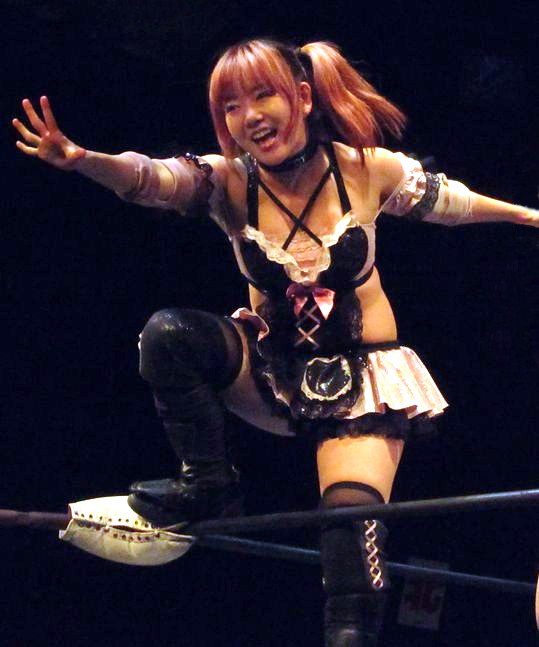
Matsumoto in October 2016

On August 24, Matsumoto made an appearance for Reina Joshi Puroresu, when she and Ice Ribbon alum, Wrestling New Classic (WNC) representative Makoto, entered a tournament for the vacant Reina World Tag Team Championship, losing to Leon and Rydeen Hagane in their first round match. On September 6, Matsumoto appeared at a WNC press conference, announcing that she had joined Makoto's supposed wrestling school, a stable, which also included Kaho Kobayashi. Matsumoto made her WNC in-ring debut on September 18, when she, Makoto and Kobayashi defeated Takuya Kito in a three-on-one handicap match. The new alliance also led to Matsumoto and Kobayashi teaming together in Ice Ribbon. On November 2, Matsumoto received her first shot at the newly renamed ICE×∞ Championship, but was defeated by the defending champion, Tsukasa Fujimoto. In early 2014, Matsumoto tried to twice capture the International Ribbon Tag Team Championship from her Muscle Venus partners Hikaru Shida and Tsukasa Fujimoto, first alongside Mio Shirai on March 9 and then with Hamuko Hoshi three days later. At the September 15 Ice Ribbon show, Matsumoto was defeated by Oz Academy representative Mayumi Ozaki, who afterwards offered her a spot in her villainous Seikigun stable. On September 23, Matsumoto made her Oz Academy debut in a segment, where Ozaki grabbed her head and nodded it, essentially accepting her own offer on Matsumoto's behalf. On October 12, Matsumoto made her debut for World Wonder Ring Stardom, losing to World of Stardom Champion Yoshiko in a non-title match. On October 19, Matsumoto made an appearance for All Japan Pro Wrestling, losing to Risa Sera in a rare women's match, provided by Ice Ribbon.

On July 3, 2016, Matsumoto "quit" Gake no Fuchi Puroresu and officially re-joined Ice Ribbon.

== Acting career ==
=== Filmography ===
- 2006: Doko Mademo Kono Saki E (どこまでもこの先へ)
- 2009: Three Count (スリーカウント, Surī Kaunto)

=== Television ===
- 1999: Ponkikkīzu (ポンキッキーズ)
- 2008–2009: Muscle Venus (マッスルビーナス, Massuru Bīnasu)
- 2009: 2009 New Year's Parlor Tricks Tournament (新春かくし芸大会2009, Shinshun Kakushigei Taikai 2009)
- 2009: Push-Suma (ぷっすま, Pussuma)
- 2009: Wrestle Arena (レッスルアリーナ, Ressuru Arīna)
- 2010: Suteru Koi Areba, Hirou Koi Ari (捨てる恋あれば拾う恋あり)
- 2010: Pigu☆1: Pigusuta Gakuen (ピグ☆1~ピグスタ学園)

== Other media ==
In 2008, the cast of Muscle Venus recorded a song titled Itsuka Kitto (いつかきっと; "Someday"), which was released as a single on November 5, 2008, and later used as the theme song for the Three Count film. Matsumoto, along with Hikaru Shida and Tsukasa Fujimoto, was featured in Japanese pop group angela's 2012 music video for their song "The Lights of Heroes". In July 2013, Matsumoto released her first gravure DVD, titled Crazy Honey. Matsumoto is part of the idol girl group Black DPG.

== Championships and accomplishments ==
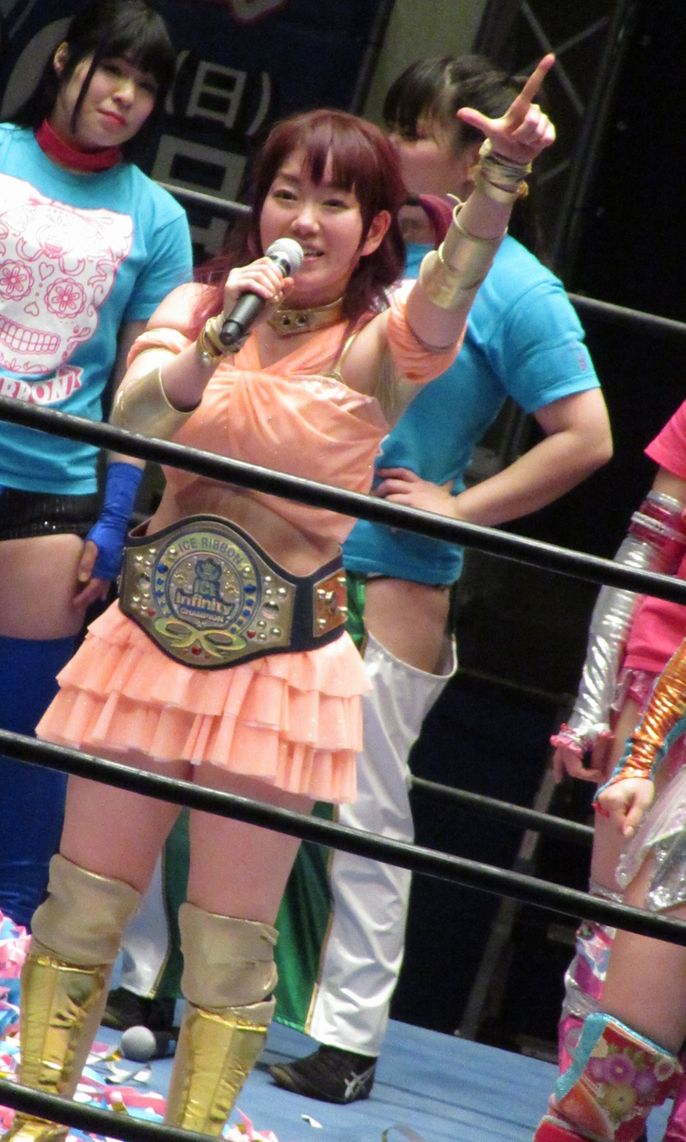
Matsumoto is a former two-time ICE Cross Infinity Champion

- Ice Ribbon
  - ICE×60 Championship (2 times)
  - International Ribbon Tag Team Championship (2 times) – with Jun Kasai (1) and Neko Nitta (1)
  - Triangle Ribbon Championship (3 times)
  - Captain's Fall Six Woman Tag Tournament (2010) – with Sayaka Obihiro and Tsukasa Fujimoto
  - Triangle Ribbon Championship Tournament (2013)
  - Second Triple Crown Champion
  - Ice Ribbon Year-End Award (1 time)
    - Humor Award (2016)
