= Hiragi Kurumi =

Japanese professional wrestler

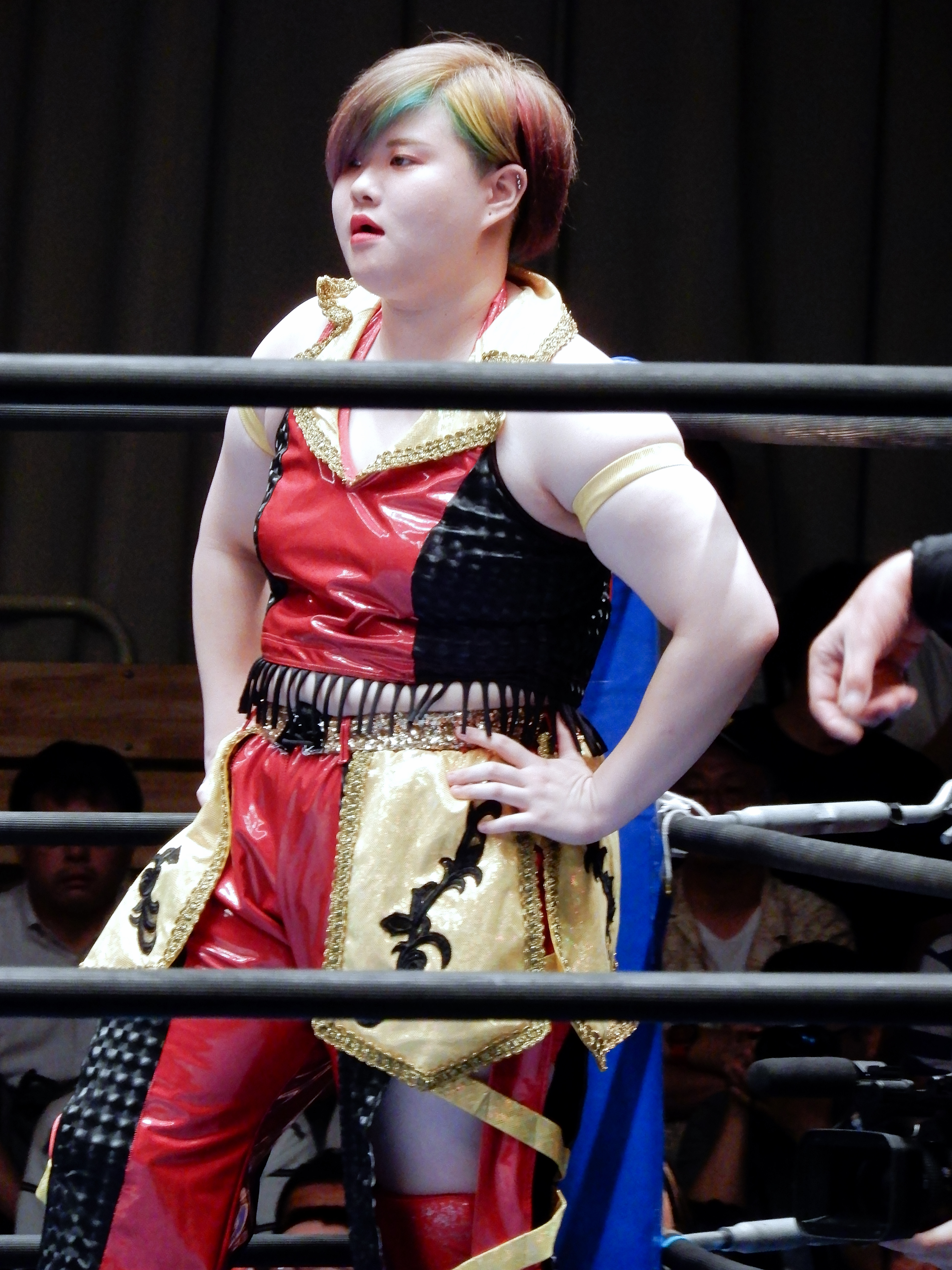
- Kurumi in August 2019

Personal information
- Born: April 1, 2000 (age 26) Tokyo, Japan

Professional wrestling career
- Ring name(s): Kurumi; Hiragi Kurumi
- Billed height: 165 cm (5 ft 5 in)
- Billed weight: 65 kg (143 lb)
- Trained by: Emi Sakura
- Debut: 2010

Hiragi Kurumi (平木くるみ, Hiragi Kurumi; born April 1, 2000) is a Japanese professional wrestler currently working for the Japanese professional wrestling promotion Ice Ribbon where she is a former two-time ICE Cross Infinity Champion, two-time IW19 Champion, and six-time International Ribbon Tag Team Champion.

== Professional wrestling career ==
=== Independent circuit (2010–present) ===
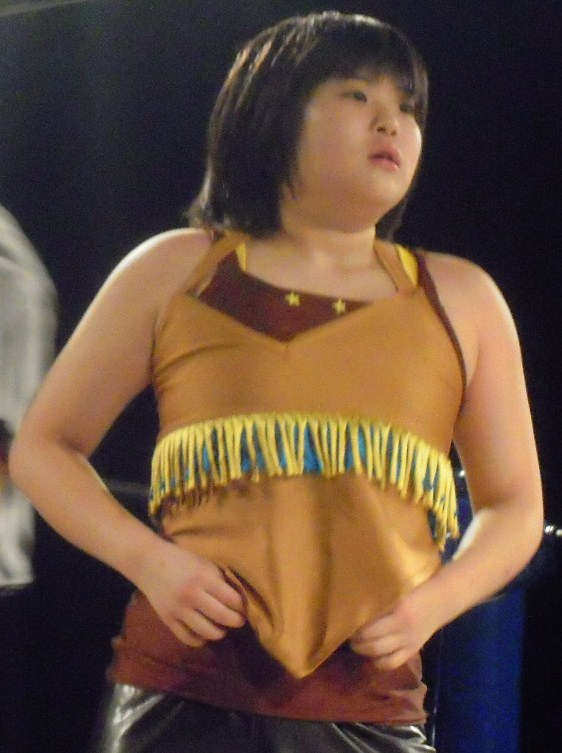
Kurumi aged eleven in May 2011

Kurumi is known for her activity in various professional wrestling promotions other than Ice Ribbon. At the WAVE Summer Fiesta '16 of Pro Wrestling Wave, she teamed up with Tsukushi, falling short to Ryo Mizunami and Misaki Ohata. At a house show hosted by JWP Joshi Puroresu on January 29, 2017, Kurumi teamed up with Megumi Yabushita and defeated Kazuki and Rydeen Hagane in a judo rules tag team match. While working in Seadlinnng, she participated at SEAdLINNNG Fortissimo from May 24, 2017, where she teamed up with Sareee to defeat Rin Kadokura and Takumi Iroha. Kurumi also worked for Oz Academy, and at OZ Academy Autumn Festival on October 4, 2020, she teamed up with Tsubasa Kuragaki and unsuccessfully faced MISSION K4 (Kaho Kobayashi and Kakeru Sekiguchi) in no.1 contendership tournament semi-final for the OZ Academy Tag Team Championship. At OZ Academy Plum Hanasaku on August 28, 2020, she teamed up with Asuka and picked up a victory over Itsuki Aoki and Rina Yamashita in a tag team match. An important event where she participated was the OZ Academy Sonoko Kato 25th Anniversary from July 12, 2020, which portraited 25 years of Sonoko Kato's career, where she teamed up with Tsubasa Kuragaki to face Kato herself and Mika Akino.

==== Ice Ribbon (2010–2021) ====
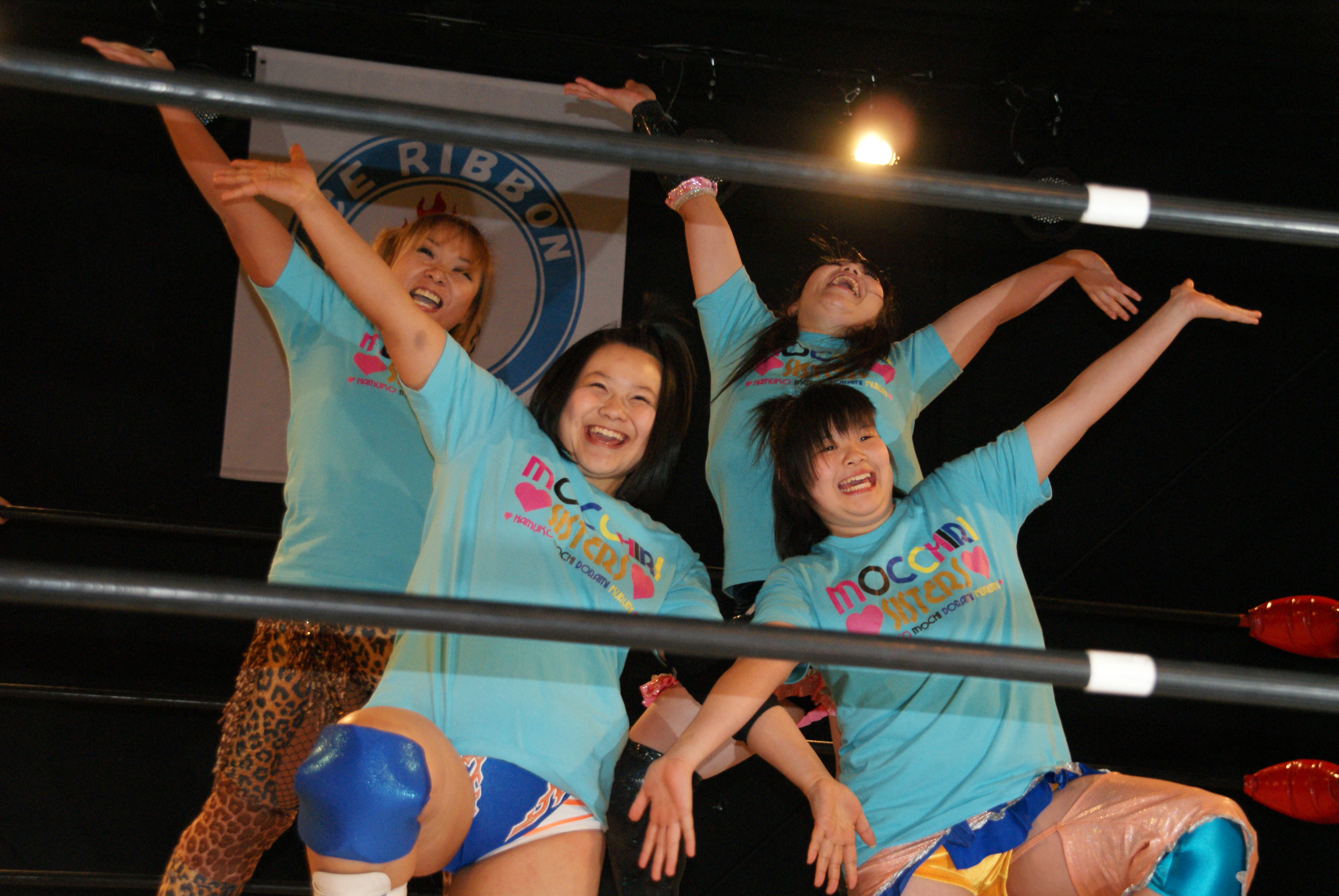
Kurumi (far right from bottom row) in January 2012 among her "Mocchiri Family" unit stablemates Dorami Nagano, Hamuko Hoshi and Mochi Miyagi

Kurumi made her professional wrestling debut at the early age of 10, working her first match for Ice Ribbon, at New Ice Ribbon #149 from January 16, 2010, where she fell short to Chii Tomiya. She became one of the youngest champions in professional wrestling history after she defeated Tsukushi at 19 O'Clock Girls Pro Wrestling 87 on September 16, 2011 at the age of 11 to win the vacant IW19 Championship. At RibbonMania 2019, an event which portraited the retirement of Tequila Saya, Kurumi participated in a 38-person gauntlet match, competing against notable opponents such as Ken Ohka, Munenori Sawa, Manami Toyota, Syuri and others. At Ice Ribbon Vs. Shinjuku 2-chome, an event produced by Ice Ribbon in partnership with 666 Wrestling on November 8, 2020, Kurumi participated in a 18-man battle royal also involving Masashi Takeda, Shinobu Sugawara and Asukama, and on the same night, she unsuccessfully challenged Ram Kaicho and Koju Takeda for the Triangle Ribbon Championship in a three-way match. At Ice Ribbon Risa Sera's 5th Produced Show from October 24, 2020, Kurumi participated in a Ironwoman hardcore match for the FantastICE Championship also involving the champion Risa Sera and Suzu Suzuki and a few male participants such as Minoru Fujita, Yuko Miyamoto, Takashi Sasaki and Takayuki Ueki.

=== World Wonder Ring Stardom (2022–present) ===
Kurumi aligned herself with Suzu Suzuki, Risa Sera, Akane Fujita and Mochi Miyagi in the Prominence stable at the end of 2021 after their contract with Ice Ribbon expired, leaving them to wander as freelance wrestlers. Kurumi and the rest of the stable made their first appearance in World Wonder Ring Stardom's first pay-per-view of 2022, the Stardom Nagoya Supreme Fight from January 29 where they picked a fight with the Donna Del Mondo stable. At Mid Summer Champions in Nagoya, the second event of the Stardom Mid Summer Champions series which took place on July 24, 2022, Kurumi teamed up with Suzuki and Risa Sera to defeat Cosmic Angels (Mina Shirakawa, Unagi Sayaka and Hikari Shimizu) and Queen's Quest (Lady C, Hina and Miyu Amasaki). At Stardom Dream Queendom 2 on December 29, 2022, Suzuki teamed up with Suzu Suzuki and Risa Sera and defeated Oedo Tai (Starlight Kid, Momo Watanabe and Saki Kashima) to win the Artist of Stardom Championship.

At the 2023 edition of the Triangle Derby, Kurumi teamed up with Suzuki and Sera and compete in the "Triangle Blue" where they faced the teams of Rebel and Enemy (Ram Kaicho, Maika Ozaki and Maya Yukihi), Lollipop (Waka Tsukiyama, Yuko Sakurai and Rina Amikura), Classmates (Hazuki, Koguma and Saya Iida), MaiHime with C (Maika, Himeka and Lady C), Abarenbo GE (Syuri, Mirai and Ami Sourei), and Oedo Tai (Natsuko Tora, Momo Watanabe and Saki Kashima), winning the tournament and the Artist of Stardom Championship.

== Championships and accomplishments ==
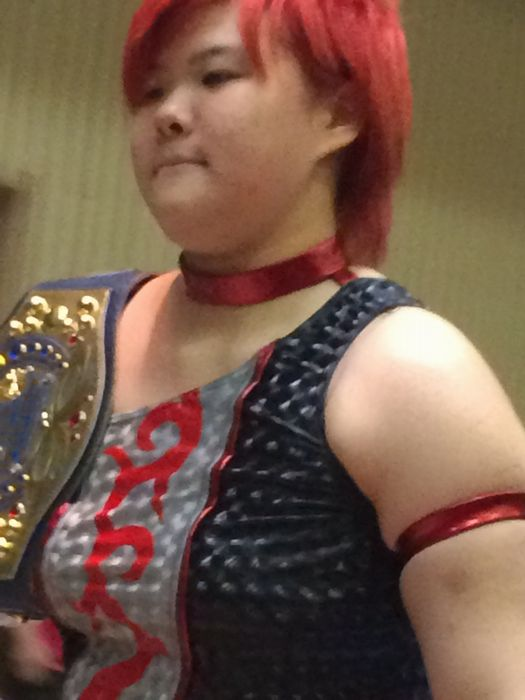
Kurumi is a two-time ICE Cross Infinity Champion

- Ice Ribbon
  - ICE×∞ Championship (2 times)
  - IW19 Championship (2 times)
  - International Ribbon Tag Team Championship (6 times) – with Hiroyo Matsumoto (1), Mochi Miyagi (1) and Tsukushi (4)
  - Sozei Pro Tag Team Championship (1 time) – with Maruko Nagasaki
  - Ice Ribbon Year-End Award (1 time)
    - Best Tag Team Award (2020) – with Mochi Miyagi
- Pro Wrestling Wave
  - Wave Tag Team Championship (1 time) – with Mochi Natsumi
- Pure-J
  - Daily Sports Women's Tag Team Championship (1 time) – with Mochi Natsumi
- World Woman Pro-Wrestling Diana
  - World Woman Pro-Wrestling Diana World Championship (1 time)
- World Wonder Ring Stardom
  - Artist of Stardom Championship (1 time) – with Risa Sera and Suzu Suzuki
  - Triangle Derby I Tournament (2023) – with Risa Sera and Suzu Suzuki
