= IW19 Championship =

Professional wrestling women's championship

- The IW19 Championship belt

Details
- Promotion: Ice Ribbon
- Date established: February 16, 2011
- Date retired: December 22, 2021

Other name
- Internet Single Championship
Statistics
- First champion: Tsukushi
- Most reigns: Tsukushi (4 reigns)
- Longest reign: Hamuko Hoshi (246 days)
- Shortest reign: Hikari Minami (5 days)
- Oldest champion: Hamuko Hoshi (43 years, 236 days)
- Youngest champion: Kurumi (11 years, 168 days)
- Heaviest champion: Hamuko Hoshi (68 kg (150 lb))
- Lightest champion: Tsukushi (40 kg (88 lb))

The Internet Wrestling 19 (IW19) Championship was a women's professional wrestling championship owned by the Ice Ribbon promotion. The championship was introduced on the March 22, 2011, episode of Ice Ribbon's 19 O'Clock Girls ProWrestling (19時女子プロレス, Jūkyū-ji Joshi Puroresu) Ustream program, where Tsukushi defeated Tsukasa Fujimoto in the finals of a tournament to become the inaugural champion. Championship matches had a 19-minute time limit, and, unlike with all other Ice Ribbon championships, in the event of a time limit draw, the champion retained the title. The title was originally defended exclusively on the 19 O'Clock Girls ProWrestling program.

== History ==
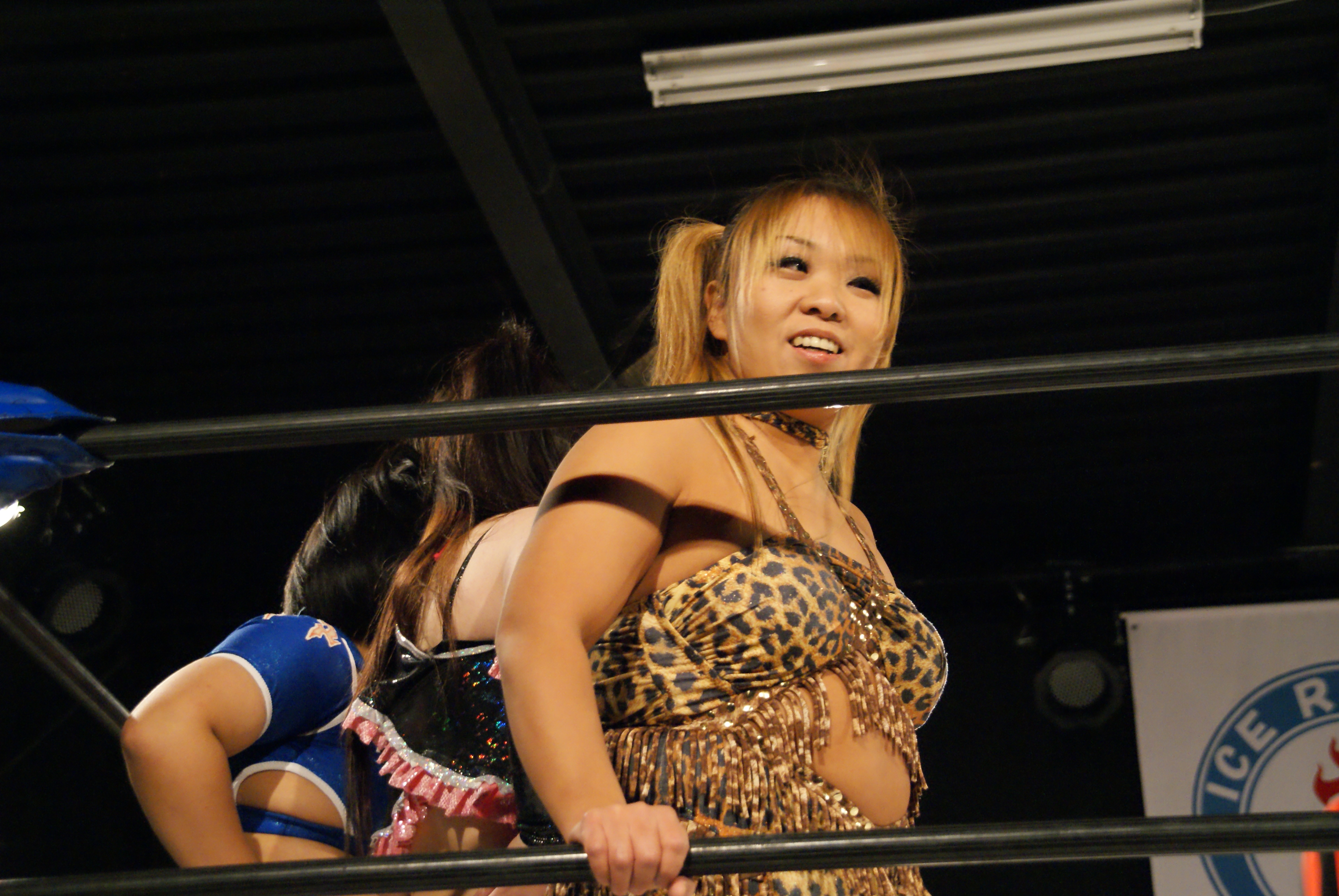
Former three-time champion, Hamuko Hoshi

Originally, 19 O'Clock Girls ProWrestling was kept separate from Ice Ribbon, but on August 26, 2011, the program was brought under the Ice Ribbon banner and the IW19 Championship recognized as an Ice Ribbon championship. With the move, the title underwent some changes, including an addition of a nineteen-year age limit and a three-year experience limit and the abolishment of a rule, where a champion must defend the title at least once every four weeks. However, in January 2012, the age and experience limits were seemingly abandoned, when Hamuko Hoshi, 29 years old, Lady Afrodita, 21 years old, Maki Narumiya, 25 years old, Sayaka Obihiro, 25 years old, Tomoki Yagami, 29 years old, and Tsukasa Fujimoto, 28 years old, all entered a number one contender's tournament. During the next ten months, the IW19 Championship was defended once every ten weeks against the winner of an eight-woman single-elimination tournament. On January 7, 2013, Ice Ribbon officially put 19 O'Clock Girls ProWrestling on hiatus as it considered the future of the program, following the departure of its original operator, Sayaka Obihiro. On May 18, Ice Ribbon announced a 19 O'Clock Girls ProWrestling event for June 22, which would see the first defense of the IW19 Championship in six months. This episode would air through Niconico as opposed to Ustream. At the end of the June 22 broadcast, Ice Ribbon officially announced the ending of the 19 O'Clock Girls ProWrestling program, although the promotion looked to hold future events on Niconico. As a result, the IW19 Championship was retired on July 14, 2013, when IW19 Champion Tsukasa Fujimoto defeated ICE×60 Champion Tsukushi in a championship unification match.

The title was reactivated with a tournament, held throughout May 2020, won by Hamuko Hoshi.

Like most professional wrestling championships, the title is won as a result of a scripted match. Tsukushi Haruka was the first champion in the title's history. Tsukasa Fujimoto, Kurumi and Hamuko Hoshi have had the most reigns as champion, all with two. Hoshi has also had the longest reign in the title's history at 246 days, while Hikari Minami's reign of five days was the shortest in the title's history. Overall, there have been 14 reigns shared among seven different wrestlers and two vacancies. Tsukushi Haruka was the final champion while in her fourth reign.

== Reigns ==
Key
No.	Overall reign number
Reign	Reign number for the specific champion
Days	Number of days held
Defenses	Number of successful defenses

No.	Champion	Championship change			Reign statistics			Notes	Ref.
No.	Champion	Date	Event	Location	Reign	Days	Defenses	Notes	Ref.
1	Tsukushi	March 22, 2011	19 O'Clock Girls Pro Wrestling 66	Sapporo, Hokkaido, Japan	1	66	3	Tsukushi defeated Tsukasa Fujimoto in the finals of a four-woman tournament to become the inaugural champion.	
2	Hikari Minami	May 27, 2011	19 O'Clock Girls Pro Wrestling 73	Sapporo, Hokkaido, Japan	1	5	0		
3	Chii Tomiya	June 1, 2011	Ice Ribbon 272: 19 O'Clock Girls Pro Wrestling 1st Anniversary Show	Tokyo, Japan	1	51	2		
—	Vacated	July 22, 2011	19 O'Clock Girls Pro Wrestling 80	Tokyo, Japan	—	—	—	Chii Tomiya voluntarily vacated the title, after wrestling Makoto to a time limit draw in a title defense.	
4	Kurumi	September 16, 2011	19 O'Clock Girls Pro Wrestling 87	Tokyo, Japan	1	77	1	Kurumi defeated Tsukushi in the finals of a four-woman tournament to win the vacant championship.	
5	Tsukushi	December 2, 2011	19 O'Clock Girls Pro Wrestling 96	Saitama, Japan	2	112	0		
6	Kurumi	March 23, 2012	19 O'Clock Girls Pro Wrestling 109	Saitama, Japan	2	70	0		
7	Tsukasa Fujimoto	June 1, 2012	19 O'Clock Girls Pro Wrestling 118: 2nd Anniversary Show	Saitama, Japan	1	70	0		
8	Aki Shizuku	August 10, 2012	19 O'Clock Girls Pro Wrestling 127	Saitama, Japan	1	70	0		
9	Hamuko Hoshi	October 19, 2012	19 O'Clock Girls Pro Wrestling 136	Saitama, Japan	1	246	1		
10	Tsukasa Fujimoto	June 22, 2013	Ice Ribbon Nagoya Event	Nagoya, Aichi, Japan	2	22	1		
—	Unified	July 14, 2013	Ice Ribbon Shinjuku Tournament	Tokyo, Japan	—	—	—	Tsukasa Fujimoto defeated Tsukushi in a championship unification match to unify the title with the ICE×60 Championship.	
11	Hamuko Hoshi	May 31, 2020	Ice Ribbon 1044	Saitama, Japan	2	223	4	After the title was reactivated, a tournament was held throughout May 2020 to determine a new champion. Hamuko Hoshi defeated Maya Yukihi in the tournament's final.	
12	Tsukushi Haruka	January 9, 2021	Yokohama Ribbon 2021	Yokohama, Japan	3	204	3		
13	Hamuko Hoshi	August 1, 2021	Ice Ribbon 1137	Yokohama, Japan	3	48	2		
14	Tsukushi Haruka	September 18, 2021	Ice Ribbon 1145	Tokyo, Japan	4	95	0		
—	Deactivated	December 22, 2021	—	—	—	—	—	Title became inactive under unknown circumstances.	

== Combined reigns ==
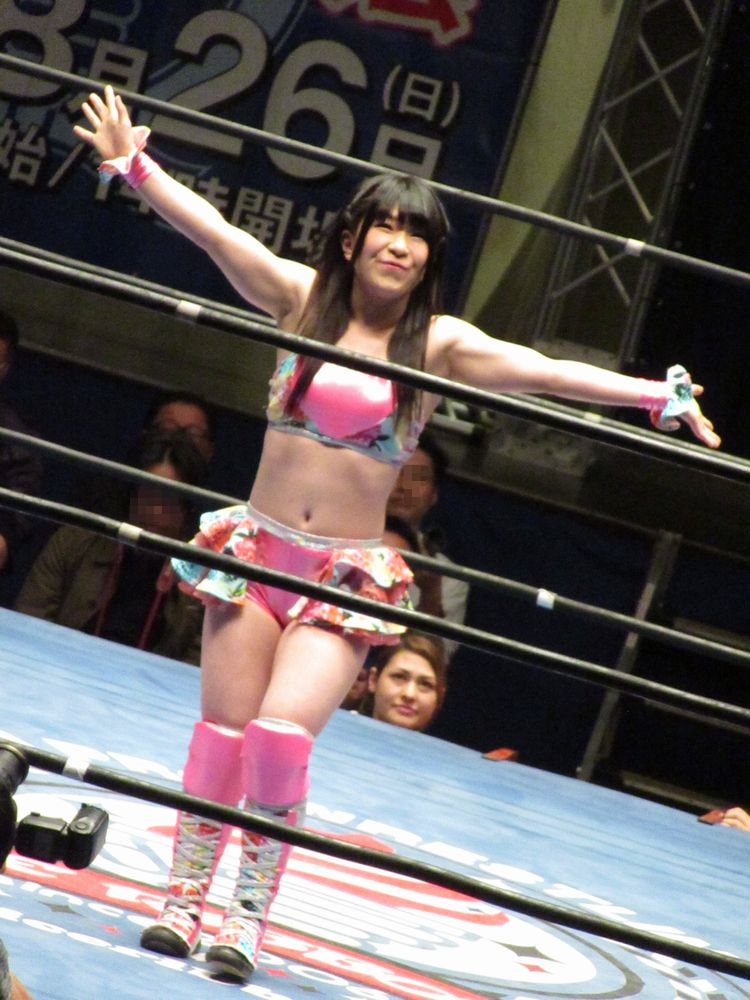
Record four-time and final champion, Tsukushi.

As of June 12, 2026.

Rank	Wrestler	No. of reigns	Combined defenses	Combined days
1	Hamuko Hoshi	3	7	517
2	Tsukushi Haruka/Tsukushi	4	6	477
3	Kurumi	2	1	147
4	Tsukasa Fujimoto	2	1	92
5	Aki Shizuku	1	0	70
6	Chii Tomiya	1	2	47
7	Hikari Minami	1	0	5
