= Hikari Minami =

Japanese professional wrestler (born 1994)

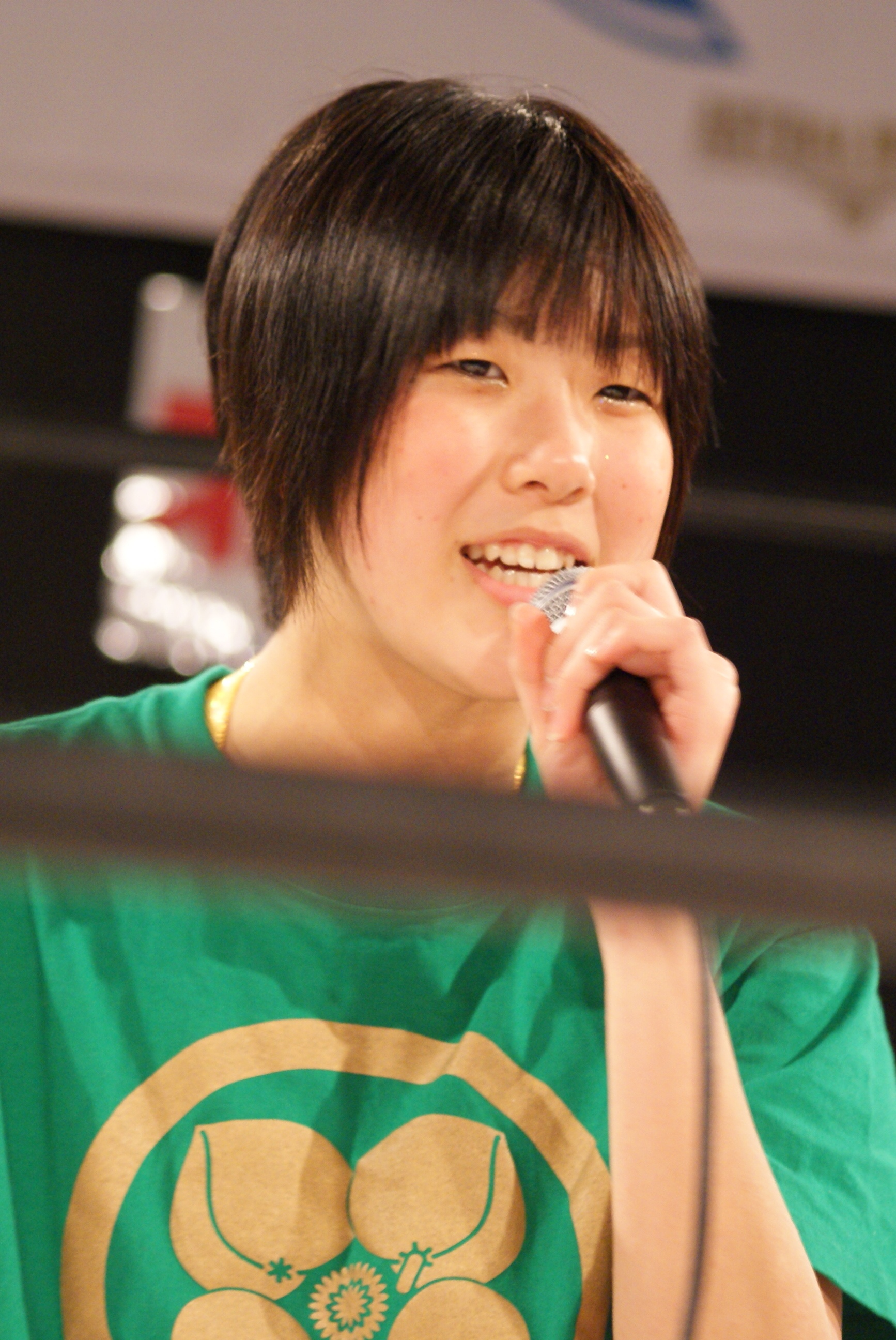
- Minami in January 2012

Personal information
- Born: December 27, 1994 (age 31) Kobe, Hyōgo

Professional wrestling career
- Ring name(s): Black Cherry #2; Hikari; Hikari Minami
- Billed height: 1.67 m (5 ft 5 1/2 in)
- Billed weight: 58 kg (128 lb)
- Trained by: Emi Sakura
- Debut: February 12, 2006

Hikari Minami (みなみ 飛香, Minami Hikari; born December 27, 1994) is a Japanese professional wrestler, best known for her work in the Ice Ribbon promotion, where she spent nearly seven years, making her debut in February 2006 at the age of eleven, becoming a two-time ICE×60 Champion and a one-time IW19 Champion. She is also known for her work in DDT Pro-Wrestling, where she is a former three-time Ironman Heavymetalweight Champion. After a three-year hiatus, she returned in November 2015, now working for Apple Star Puroresu.

== Professional wrestling career ==
=== Gatokunyan (2006) ===
Minami was trained by Gatokunyan wrestler Emi Sakura and made her professional wrestling debut at the age of eleven on February 12, 2006, working under the ring name Hikari and facing Sakura, Aika Ando, Hinata and Kinoko in a five-way match at an event in Itabashi, Tokyo. On April 29, Hikari won her first professional wrestling championship, defeating Aika to win Dramatic Dream Team's (DDT) Ironman Heavymetalweight Championship. Six days later, Hikari lost the title to Misae Genki, only to regain it from Miki Ishii later that same day. Hikari's second reign with the title came to an end on June 5, when she was defeated by Natsuki☆Head.

=== Ice Ribbon (2006–2012) ===
In April 2006, Emi Sakura left Gatokunyan and took most of her trainees, Hikari included, with her to form the core of her new Ice Ribbon promotion. Hikari made her debut for Ice Ribbon at the promotion's second ever event on June 20, defeating her elementary school friend Seina. During the next six months, Hikari and Seina developed a storyline rivalry, facing each other in four more singles matches, with Hikari winning the series 4–1. On December 5, Hikari wrestled male wrestler Ken Ohka to a time limit draw, which led to the two forming a partnership on January 8, 2007. The two have wrestled semi-regularly as a tag team ever since. In late January, Hikari began competing under the ring name Hikari Minami, after getting the blessing of former All Japan Women's Pro-Wrestling performer and family friend Suzuka Minami to use the surname. In storyline, Hikari is sometimes referred to as Suzuka's niece and billed as the "Second Generation Marine Wolf"; Marine Wolves being the former tag team of Suzuka Minami and Akira Hokuto. During the rest of the year, Minami's rivalry with Seina also came to include Seina's younger sister Riho.

From December 7, 2007, to December 13, 2008, Minami took an entire year off professional wrestling to concentrate on finishing junior high school. In her return match, Minami wrestled old rival Seina to a time limit draw. The following year, Minami began making challenges for Ice Ribbon's top championship, the ICE×60 Championship, failing in two title matches against Emi Sakura and one against Tsukasa Fujimoto. On June 5, 2010, Minami turned heel by attacking ICE×60 Champion Emi Sakura from behind, after she had successfully defended the title against Tsukushi, before announcing her intention of going for the championship herself. On July 10, Minami defeated Hikaru Shida, Riho and Tsukasa Fujimoto in a four-way match, scoring all three eliminations in the process, to become the number one contender to Sakura's title. Nine days later, Minami defeated Sakura to win the ICE×60 Championship for the first time. After a 66-day reign, Minami lost the title to JWP Joshi Puroresu wrestler Command Bolshoi in her first defense.

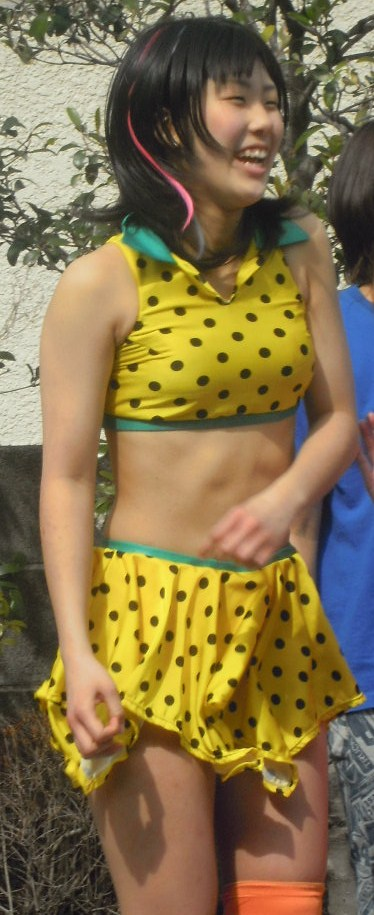
Minami in March 2011

On December 24, Minami made her debut for Smash at Happening Eve, where she teamed with Chii Tomiya and Kushida in a six-person tag team match, where they were defeated by Isami Kodaka, Makoto and Yusuke Kodama. In late 2010 and early 2011, Minami made appearances for Union Pro Wrestling, performing under a mask and the character of Black Cherry #2 as part of the storyline rivalry between Cherry and Black Cherry, portrayed by fellow Ice Ribbon wrestler Riho. Minami returned to Smash on March 31, 2011, at Smash.15, where she, Riho and Tsukushi defeated Emi Sakura, Makoto and Mochi Miyagi in a six-woman tag team match. The following month, Minami and Riho began producing their own events under the banner of "Teens", which would focus on spotlighting Ice Ribbon's younger wrestlers. On May 27, Minami defeated Tsukushi to win Ice Ribbon's 19 O'Clock Girls ProWrestling project's Internet Wrestling 19 Championship for the first time. Minami lost the title to Chii Tomiya only five days later in her first defense. On June 15, Minami defeated Remi Nagano to win the Ironman Heavymetalweight Championship for the third time. She would lose the title to Emi Sakura later that same day. On August 7, Minami made her debut for the JWP promotion, losing to Command Bolshoi. During the match, Minami suffered a bloody lip and a ruptured eardrum as a result of Bolshoi hitting her with multiple shoteis.

Upon her return to Ice Ribbon, Minami pinned ICE×60 Champion Tsukasa Fujimoto on August 13 in a ten-woman tag team captain's fall match and was as a result named the number one contender to her title. On August 21, Minami defeated Fujimoto to win the ICE×60 Championship for the second time. During the next few weeks, Minami went on to successfully defend the title against Chii Tomiya and Hikaru Shida. In October, Minami, Emi Sakura, Hikaru Shida and Tsukasa Fujimoto traveled to Nottingham, England to take part in events promoted by Pro Wrestling EVE and Southside Wrestling Entertainment (SWE). During the tour, Minami successfully defended the ICE×60 Championship for the third time, against Shanna. During 2011, Minami also took part in Ice Ribbon's interpromotional rivalry with the Sendai Girls' Pro Wrestling promotion. On October 27, Minami, Emi Sakura, Hikaru Shida, Tsukasa Fujimoto and Tsukushi represented Ice Ribbon in Sendai's Joshi Puroresu Dantai Taikou Flash tournament, a single-elimination tournament, where different joshi promotions battled each other. The team was eliminated from the tournament in the first round by Team Sendai (Meiko Satomura, Dash Chisako, Kagetsu, Miyako Morino and Sendai Sachiko). After successfully defending the ICE×60 Championship against Kurumi on November 5, Minami continued her heelish behaviour, first refusing to accept Tsukasa Fujimoto's challenge for the title and then calling Emi Sakura a dictator and accusing her of playing favorites, after the title match was made official. On November 19, Minami lost the ICE×60 Championship back to Fujimoto in her fifth defense, ending her reign at 90 days.

Despite already being a former three-time Ironman Heavymetalweight Champion, Minami only began working regularly for DDT Pro-Wrestling in November 2011, when she took part in an audition battle royal, which eventually led to Danshoku Dino and Makoto Oishi electing her as the newest member of their Homoiro Clover Z stable, breaking Minami's longtime partnership with Ken Ohka in the process. On December 25 at RibbonMania 2011, Seina returned to Ice Ribbon, after a two-year hiatus, to wrestle her retirement match against her sister Riho. After the match, a tearful Minami entered the ring and challenged her childhood friend to a three-minute match, which she accepted. Minami went on to win the match in just under three minutes with the Blockbuster. On January 4, 2012, Minami won Ribbon: The Best 2012, a six-person tag team match set to determine the new face of the promotion in the aftermath of Emi Sakura's departure. After a nine-month break, Minami brought back the Teens concept, producing Teens4 on March 3, where she was defeated by Riho in the main event. On July 28, Minami reunited with Command Bolshoi to enter JWP's annual Natsu Onna Kettei Tournament, which JWP this time co-produced with Ice Ribbon. After a victory over the team of Kazuki and Miyako Matsumoto, Minami and Bolshoi were eliminated from the tournament by Arisa Nakajima and Hikaru Shida in a semifinal match that went to overtime following an original fifteen-minute time limit draw. On August 20 at Teens7, Minami teamed with Stardom's Mayu Iwatani in a tag team main event, where they were defeated by Stardom's Eri Susa and JWP's Manami Katsu. Following the match, Minami announced that she was taking an indefinite break from professional wrestling to concentrate on her college entrance exam. On January 2, 2013, it was announced that Minami had officially quit Ice Ribbon effective December 31, 2012.

=== Apple Star Puroresu (2015–present) ===
On October 6, 2015, it was announced that Minami would be returning and wrestling her first match in over three years at Apple Star Puroresu's inaugural event on November 27, 2015. On November 27, Minami was defeated in her return match by Ayako Hamada. On January 10, 2016, it was announced that Minami had signed an exclusive contract with Apple Star Puroresu. On February 28, Minami made her debut for Reina Joshi Puroresu, teaming with Konami in a tag team match, where they were defeated by Kagetsu and Yako Fujigasaki.

== Championships and accomplishments ==
- 666
  - Young Ribbon Mix Tag Team Championship (1 time) – with Dynasty
  - Mixed Tag Team 1Day Tournament (2011) – with Dynasty
- Dramatic Dream Team / DDT Pro-Wrestling
  - Ironman Heavymetalweight Championship (3 times)
- Ice Ribbon
  - ICE×60 Championship (2 times)
  - IW19 Championship (1 time)
  - Triangle Ribbon Championship (1 time)
  - International Ribbon Tag Team Championship (1 time, current) – with Manami Katsu
  - Seventh Ice Ribbon Triple Crown Champion
  - Second Ice Ribbon Grand Slam Champion
