= Tsukushi Haruka =

Japanese professional wrestler (born 1997)

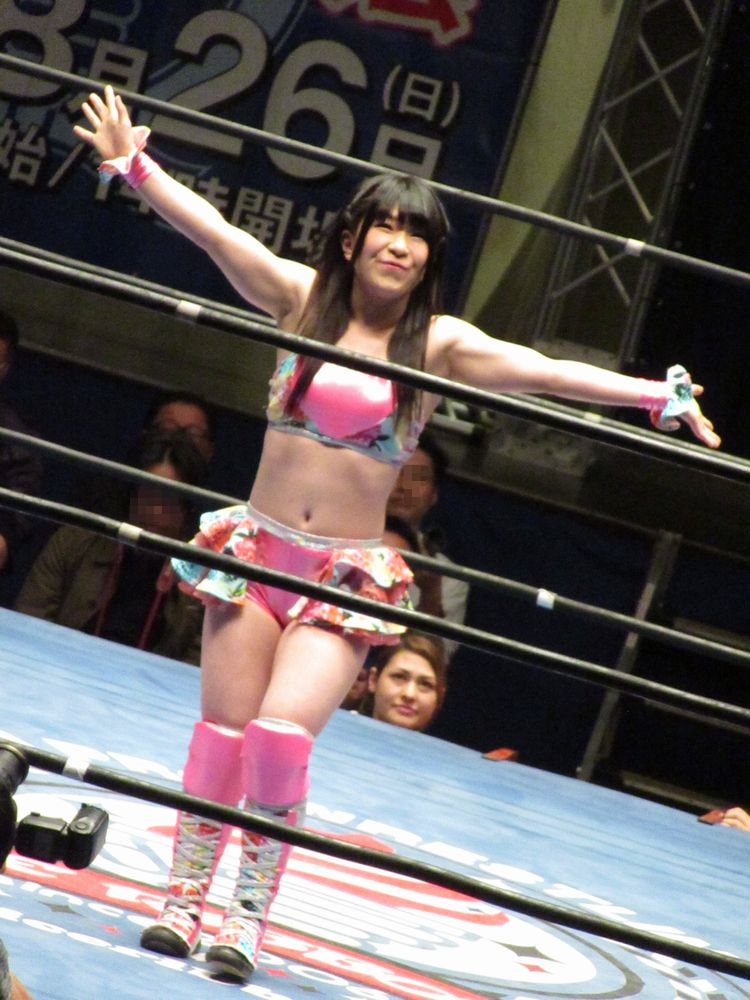
- Tsukushi in March 2018

Personal information
- Born: September 6, 1997 (age 28) Kamisu, Ibaraki

Professional wrestling career
- Ring name(s): Hamuko-fu Tsukushi; Mask de Tsukka; Tsukushi; Tsukushi Haruka
- Billed height: 1.48 m (4 ft 10 1/2 in)
- Billed weight: 43 kg (95 lb)
- Trained by: Emi Sakura
- Debut: January 16, 2010
- Retired: May 4, 2022

Tsukushi Haruka (春輝つくし, Haruka Tsukushi; born September 6, 1997) is a retired Japanese professional wrestler. Trained by Emi Sakura, Tsukushi made her debut for her Ice Ribbon promotion in January 2010 as part of a trial series with Kurumi. After winning the fan voting, Tsukushi was made an official part of Ice Ribbon's roster the following March and she has since wrestled regularly for the promotion. She is a former one-time ICE×60 Champion, record ten-time International Ribbon Tag Team Champion and record three-time IW19 Champion. Tsukushi's accomplishments outside of Ice Ribbon include winning DDT Pro-Wrestling's Ironman Heavymetalweight Championship, JWP Joshi Puroresu's 2014 Tag League the Best and Reina Joshi Puroresu's Reina World Tag Team Championship.

== Professional wrestling career ==
=== Ice Ribbon (2009–2022) ===
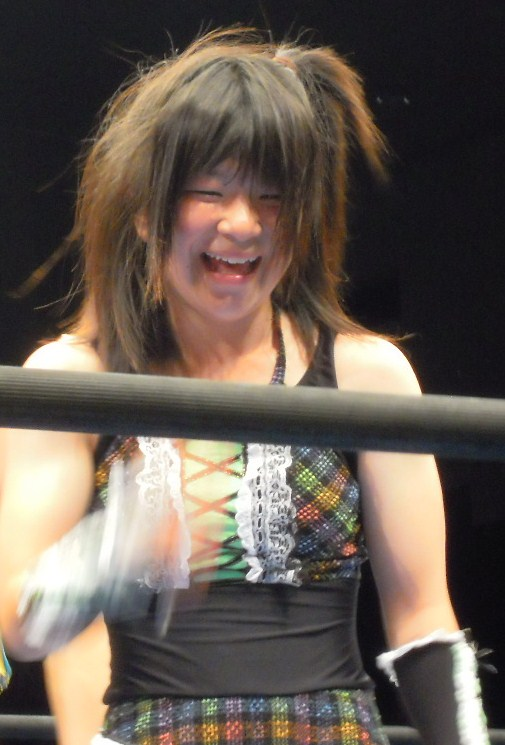
Tsukushi in September 2010

In December 2009, Tsukushi, then only twelve years old, and nine-year-old Kurumi began training professional wrestling under Emi Sakura at her promotion Ice Ribbon's dojo in Saitama. Tsukushi's training sessions with Sakura mainly took place on weekends, while on weekdays she remained in her hometown of Kamisu, training amateur wrestling with a local male junior high school wrestling team. In January 2010, Tsukushi and Kurumi were entered into a trial series, which saw them both compete in three-minute time limit matches at Ice Ribbon events with those in attendance being given the right to vote on which one should be made a permanent member of the roster; the first to reach 500 votes would win the series. Tsukushi made her professional wrestling debut on January 16, when she wrestled Chii Tomiya to a three-minute time limit draw. During the next two months, Tsukushi also wrestled Emi Sakura twice, Mai Ichii three times, and Chii Tomiya and Hamuko Hoshi both once to a time limit draw, before suffering her first loss on March 6, against Miyako Matsumoto. On March 13, Tsukushi and Kurumi were defeated in a tag team match by Chii Tomiya and Riho. After the match it was announced that Tsukushi had won the trial series 506 fan votes to 379 and had as a result earned the right to become a member of Ice Ribbon's roster. The following day, she was defeated by Chii Tomiya in her official debut match. Tsukushi earned her first win on April 29, when she pinned Tomiya in a tag team match, debuting her finishing maneuver, Harukaze ("Spring Breeze"), in the process. On May 22, Tsukushi broke the record for the fastest win in Ice Ribbon history, when she pinned Emi Sakura in just five seconds. The win earned her a shot at Sakura's ICE×60 Championship, Ice Ribbon's top title, however, she was defeated in the title match on June 5. On July 11, Tsukushi made her debut for the NEO Japan Ladies Pro Wrestling promotion, losing to fellow Ice Ribbon worker Makoto. Tsukushi's first year in professional wrestling ended with her biggest match yet, when she teamed with Natsuki☆Taiyo and Sayaka Obihiro on December 29 in a 24-minute main event, where they were defeated by Emi Sakura, Nanae Takahashi and Yoshiko Tamura.

On March 22, 2011, Tsukushi entered a tournament to crown the first ever Internet Wrestling 19 Champion; a title contested for exclusively on Ice Ribbon's Ustream program 19 O'Clock Girls ProWrestling. After defeating Mochi Miyagi in her opening match, Tsukushi advanced to the finals, where she managed to score an upset win over the reigning ICE×60, International Ribbon Tag Team and Triangle Ribbon Champion Tsukasa Fujimoto, winning her first title and becoming the inaugural IW19 Champion. On March 31, Tsukushi made her debut for Smash at Smash.15, where she teamed with Hikari Minami and Riho to defeat Emi Sakura, Makoto and Mochi Miyagi in a six-woman tag team match. On April 10, Tsukushi defended the IW19 Championship for the first time in a special episode of 19 O'Clock Girls ProWrestling, which aired live from the Kashimagakuen High School (ja) in Tsukushi's home prefecture of Ibaraki. The title defense against Emi Sakura ended in a nineteen-minute time limit draw, which meant that Tsukushi retained her title. Five days later, Tsukushi successfully defended the title against Makoto at an Ice Ribbon and Osaka Pro Wrestling co-promoted episode of 19 O'Clock Girls ProWrestling. The following day, Tsukushi and Riho unsuccessfully challenged Emi Sakura and Ray for the International Ribbon Tag Team Championship. Also in April, Hikari Minami and Riho began producing their own professional wrestling events under the banner of "Teens", which also became the name of the informal stable, which in addition to the two also included Tsukushi, Dorami Nagano and Kurumi. On April 24, Tsukushi was defeated by Riho in the main event of Teens.1. As a result of pinning Tsukasa Fujimoto in the IW19 Championship tournament final, Fujimoto agreed to defend the ICE×60 Championship against Tsukushi. The title match took place on May 5 in the main event of Golden Ribbon at Korakuen Hall, where Fujimoto retained her title. On May 13, Tsukushi made her third defense of the IW19 Championship, defeating Chii Tomiya. On May 27, she lost the title to Hikari Minami in her fourth defense, ending her reign at 66 days.

On June 11, Tsukushi broke her own record for the fastest win in Ice Ribbon history by pinning Emi Sakura in four seconds. The following day, Tsukushi wrestled at an event produced by the Jungle Jack 21 stable, facing the group's leader, joshi veteran Aja Kong, in a losing effort. In a post-match interview, Kong praised her young opponent, comparing her to joshi legend Manami Toyota. Tsukushi received another shot at the ICE×60 Championship on June 19 at Teens.III, but was again defeated by Tsukasa Fujimoto. On July 10 at Yokohama Ribbon, Tsukushi was defeated in a singles match by freelancer Manami Toyota and was afterwards once again praised by her opponent, who had a 23-year experience advantage over her. Tsukushi and Toyota had a rematch on August 21 at Fushigi no Kuni no Ice, where Toyota was again victorious. On September 16, Tsukushi attempted to regain the IW19 Championship, but was defeated in the finals of a tournament for the vacant title by her old training partner Kurumi. On September 24, Tsukushi teamed with Manami Toyota in a tournament for the vacant International Ribbon Tag Team Championship. After defeating the team of Kurumi and Ray in the first round and former champions Muscle Venus (Hikaru Shida and Tsukasa Fujimoto) in the semifinals, Tsukushi and Toyota were defeated in the finals by Ice Ribbon's rival promotion Sendai Girls' Pro Wrestling representatives Dash Chisako and Sendai Sachiko.

Before leaving Ice Ribbon, Toyota suggested that Tsukushi should form a new tag team with Tsukasa Fujimoto; the two followed the suggestion and dubbed their new team "Dropkickers". On October 15, Dropkickers wrestled Chisako and Sachiko to a twenty-minute time limit draw; as a result, the title was once again declared vacant. The following day, Tsukushi defeated Riho to earn the right to represent Ice Ribbon at Sendai Girls' Joshi Puroresu Dantai Taikou Flash tournament, a single-elimination tournament, where different joshi promotions battled each other. On October 27, Team Ice Ribbon (Tsukushi, Emi Sakura, Hikari Minami, Hikaru Shida and Tsukasa Fujimoto) was eliminated from the tournament in the first round by Team Sendai Girls' (Meiko Satomura, Dash Chisako, Kagetsu, Miyako Morino and Sendai Sachiko), when Tsukushi was pinned by Chisako. On December 2, Tsukushi defeated Kurumi to regain the IW19 Championship. The rivalry between Ice Ribbon and Sendai Girls' culminated on December 25 at RibbonMania 2011, where Tsukushi and Emi Sakura faced Meiko Satomura and Sendai Sachiko in a match for the vacant International Ribbon Tag Team Championship. Tsukushi won the match for her team and Ice Ribbon by pinning Sachiko, thus winning the International Ribbon Tag Team Championship for the first time. However, as Sakura had announced just prior to the match that she would be leaving Ice Ribbon the following month, her and Tsukushi's reign lasted only three days before they lost the title to Hikaru Shida and Maki Narumiya. On January 7, 2012, Tsukushi defeated Sakura in her Ice Ribbon farewell match.

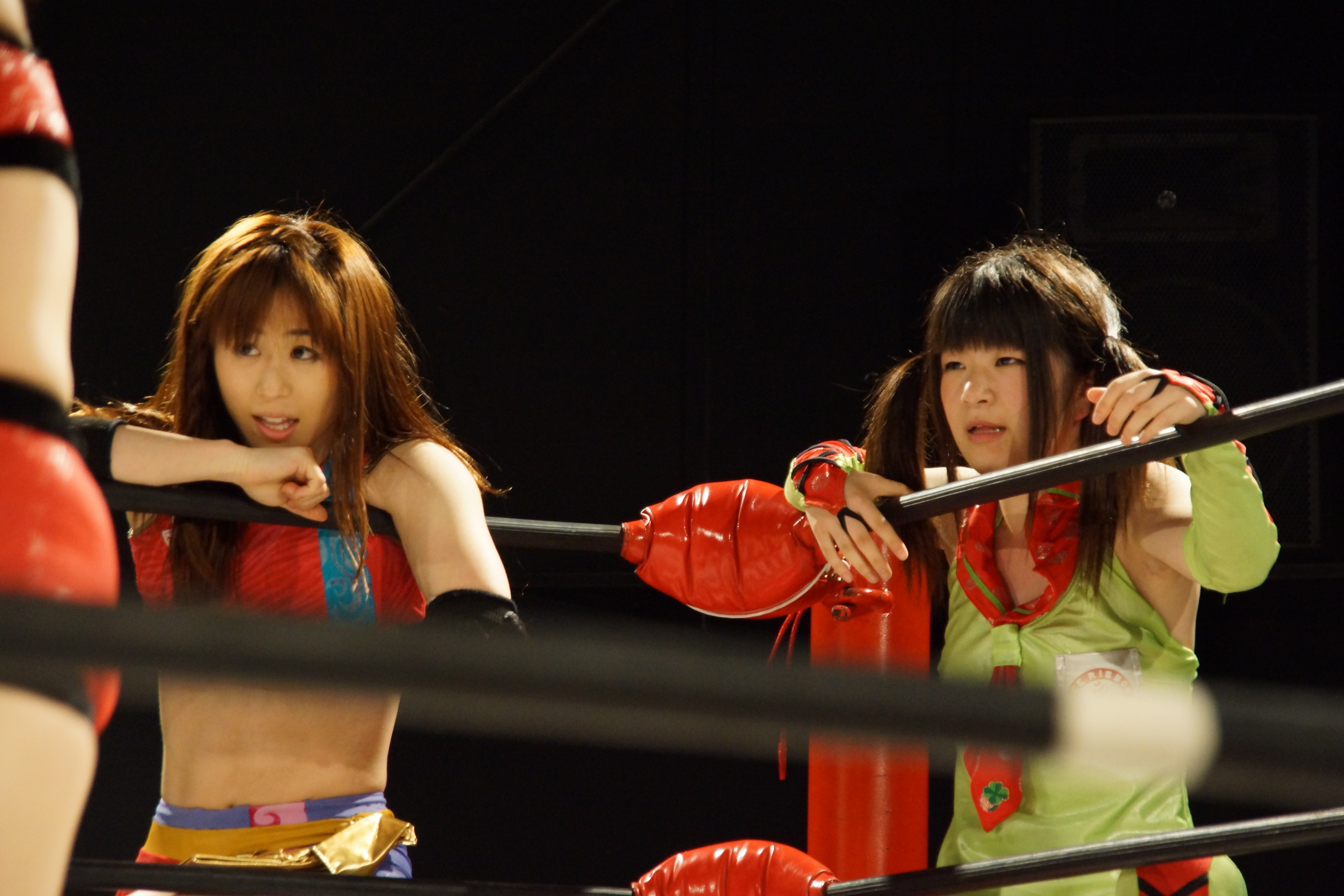
Tsukushi and Tsukasa Fujimoto, the Dropkickers, in April 2012

On January 8, Tsukushi took part in Bull Nakano's retirement event, participating in a special ten woman tag team match, where each team allegedly included wrestlers in their tens, twenties, thirties, forties and fifties. In the match, Tsukushi, Dump Matsumoto, Kyoko Inoue, Leon and Sawako Shimono defeated Cherry (the only wrestler in the match whose real age was not known publicly), Jaguar Yokota, Manami Toyota, Natsuki☆Taiyo and Tomoka Nakagawa. Back in Ice Ribbon, Tsukushi went on to form a regular tag team with Tsukasa Fujimoto. On January 14, Tsukushi pinned ICE×60 and International Ribbon Tag Team Champion Hikaru Shida in a tag team match, where she and Fujimoto faced Shida and Kurumi. On January 25, Fujimoto asked for a shot at the International Ribbon Tag Team Championship for the Dropkickers. The challenge was accepted by Shida, who then went on to avenge her loss to Tsukushi by defeating her in a non-title match four days later. On February 5 at Yokohama Ribbon, Tsukushi and Fujimoto defeated Shida and Maki Narumiya to become the new International Ribbon Tag Team Champions. Tsukushi and Fujimoto made their first title defense on March 20 at Ice Ribbon March 2012, defeating the team of Kurumi and Manami Toyota. Three days later, Tsukushi lost the IW19 Championship to Kurumi in her first defense, ending her second reign at 112 days. On May 5, Tsukushi and Fujimoto lost the International Ribbon Tag Team Championship to the Happy Makers (Aoi Kizuki and Sayaka Obihiro) in the main event of Golden Ribbon 2012, ending their reign at 90 days. Tsukushi and Fujimoto regained the title from the Happy Makers on June 17 at Ice Ribbon's sixth anniversary event. On June 23, Tsukushi surprised Fujimoto after a tag team match and pinned her to win DDT Pro-Wrestling's Ironman Heavymetalweight Championship, taking advantage of a rule, where the champion could be pinned or submitted anytime and anywhere. Shortly afterwards, Tsukushi comically lost the title to one of Ice Ribbon's ring mats. On July 15 at Sapporo Ribbon 2012, Tsukushi and Fujimoto lost the International Ribbon Tag Team Championship to Miyako Matsumoto and Neko Nitta in their first title defense.

On July 31, Tsukushi made her debut for DDT, taking part in an "Ice Ribbon offer match", where she and Maki Narumiya were defeated by Hikaru Shida and Neko Nitta. Tsukushi then went to form a tag team with former training partner and IW19 Championship rival Kurumi, with the two defeating Aki Shizuku and Hikari Minami, Maki Narumiya and Tsukasa Fujimoto, and Hikaru Shida and Neko Nitta in separate tag team matches to become the number one contenders to the International Ribbon Tag Team Championship. On August 12, Tsukushi and Kurumi made their debuts for Reina X World, defeating International Ribbon Tag Team Champion Neko Nitta and Reina World Tag Team Champion Hikaru Shida in a tag team match, with Tsukushi pinning Nitta for the win. On August 19, Tsukushi and Kurumi defeated Miyako Matsumoto and Neko Nitta to win the International Ribbon Tag Team Championship, starting Tsukushi's fourth reign with the title. On September 22, Tsukushi and Tsukasa Fujimoto took part in an event, which celebrated Manami Toyota's 25th anniversary in professional wrestling, teaming with Toyota in a six-woman tag team match, where they were defeated by Aja Kong, Kyoko Inoue and Tsubasa Kuragaki. The following day at Ribbon no Kishitachi 2012, Tsukushi and Kurumi, with a combined age of 27, made their first successful defense of the International Ribbon Tag Team Championship against BBA38 (Cherry and Meari Naito), with a combined age of 76. Following the win, Tsukushi announced that she was studying English with a goal of defending the International Ribbon Tag Team Championship abroad. On October 8, Tsukushi and Kurumi formed the Seishun Midori stable with Aoi Kizuki. The stable wrestled their first match together on October 28 at 2012 Yokohama Ribbon III, defeating Maki Narumiya, Neko Nitta and Nozomi in a six-woman tag team match. On November 25 at Nagoya Ribbon II – 2012, Tsukushi and Kurumi entered a one-day tag team tournament, where they were forced to put the International Ribbon Tag Team Championship on the line in all of their matches. They were, however, given a bye directly to the semifinals of the tournament. After defeating BBA38 in their semifinal match, Tsukushi and Kurumi lost the International Ribbon Tag Team Championship to Muscle Venus (Hikaru Shida and Tsukasa Fujimoto) in a final match, which was also contested for the Reina World Tag Team Championship. On December 31 at RibbonMania 2012, Tsukushi and her other Seishun Midori partner, Aoi Kizuki, defeated Kyoko Kimura and Sayaka Obihiro to win not only the International Ribbon Tag Team Championship, but also the Reina World Tag Team Championship, a title owned by the Reina X World promotion. Starting her fifth reign, Tsukushi tied Emi Sakura's record for most reigns as the International Ribbon Tag Team Champion.

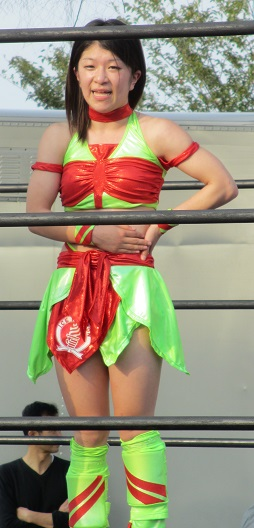
Tsukushi in October 2014

After the ICE×60 Championship was vacated, following Maki Narumiya being sidelined with an injury, Tsukushi entered a round-robin tournament to determine the new champion, wrestling Hikaru Shida to a ten-minute time limit draw in her opening match on January 26. On February 11, Tsukushi and Aoi Kizuki made their first successful defense of the International Ribbon Tag Team and Reina World Tag Team Championships against Hailey Hatred and Kurumi, with Kizuki pinning Kurumi with just one second remaining before a twenty-minute time limit, which would have resulted in the titles being vacated. After a win over Risa Sera and a draw with Neko Nitta, Tsukushi finished her ICE×60 Championship tournament round-robin block on February 16 with four points, advancing to the semifinals in the second place behind Hikaru Shida. On February 23, Tsukushi defeated Tsukasa Fujimoto in her semifinal match to advance to the finals of the tournament. On February 27, Tsukushi defeated Miyako Matsumoto to win the tournament and the ICE×60 Championship for the first time. Tsukushi made her first successful title defense on March 31 against Kurumi. On April 14, Tsukushi made her debut for the JWP Joshi Puroresu promotion, teaming with Rabbit Miu to defeat Nana Kawasa and Rydeen Hagane in a tag team match. On May 4, Tsukushi defeated Seishun Midori stablemate Aoi Kizuki for her second successful defense of the ICE×60 Championship. On May 25, Tsukushi and Kizuki lost the International Ribbon Tag Team and Reina World Tag Team Championships to Hikaru Shida and Tsukasa Fujimoto. On June 22, Tsukushi made her third successful defense of the ICE×60 Championship against Neko Nitta. On July 14, Tsukushi lost the ICE×60 Championship to Tsukasa Fujimoto in her fourth defense, a championship unification match also contested for the IW19 Championship, ending her reign at 137 days.

On September 7, Tsukushi produced her first own Ice Ribbon event, which celebrated her sixteenth birthday and saw her lose to veteran wrestler Gami in the main event. From January 5 to March 16, 2014, Tsukushi took part in JWP's 2014 Tag League the Best, teaming with Rabbit Miu under the team name "Haruusagi" ("Spring Rabbit"; a combination of Harukaze and the Japanese word for rabbit, usagi). After two wins and one loss, the team won their round-robin block and advanced to the finals of the tournament. On March 16, Haruusagi defeated Mascara Voladoras (Leon and Ray) in the finals to win the 2014 Tag League the Best and become the number one contenders to the Daily Sports Women's and JWP Tag Team Championships. Tsukushi and Miu received their title opportunity on May 4, but were defeated by Command Bolshoi and Kyoko Kimura in a decision match for the now vacant titles. Meanwhile, back in Ice Ribbon, Tsukushi got involved in a storyline rivalry with Mio Shirai. After a two-year break, Ice Ribbon brought back the "Teens" concept on August 14 with Tsukushi as the new head producer. In the main event of Teens8, Tsukushi and Rabbit Miu defeated International Ribbon Tag Team Champion Risa Sera and World Wonder Ring Stardom representative Takumi Iroha. On September 15, Tsukushi and Rabbit Miu unsuccessfully challenged Sera and Maki Narumiya for the International Ribbon Tag Team Championship. On December 14, Tsukushi made an appearance for Pro Wrestling Wave as part of "Young Oh! Oh!", Wave's equivalent of the Teens project, where she led the "East Japan Little Yankees" to a win over the "West Japan Giants" in a ten-woman main event tag team match, scoring the deciding pinfall over Rina Yamashita. On December 28 at Ice Ribbon's biggest event of the year, Ribbon Mania 2014, Tsukushi unsuccessfully challenged her rival Mio Shirai for the Union Fly To Everywhere World Championship. On February 22, 2015, Tsukushi made her debut for World Wonder Ring Stardom, defeating Momo Watanabe.

Shortly afterwards, after Mio Shirai had announced her upcoming retirement from professional wrestling, she and Tsukushi ended their rivalry with Tsukushi suggesting the two should form a tag team together. On March 21, the team, dubbed Shishunki ("Puberty"), defeated. STAP (Maki Narumiya and Risa Sera) to win the International Ribbon Tag Team Championship. This marked Tsukushi's sixth reign with the title, a new record. At the end of the event, Tsukushi confronted new ICE×∞ Champion Kurumi, which led to a title match between the two on March 29, where Kurumi made her first successful title defense. Tsukushi and Shirai made their first successful defenses of the International Ribbon Tag Team Championship against the Lovely Butchers (Hamuko Hoshi and Mochi Miyagi) on June 24 and Orange Happies (Aoi Kizuki and Kayoko Haruyama) on July 4. Their reign ended in their third defense on August 17 against Nekoka Tag (Leon and Neko Nitta). On August 30, Tsukushi unsuccessfully challenged Aoi Kizuki for the ICE×∞ Championship. On September 6, her 18th birthday, Tsukushi defeated Mio Shirai in Shirai's final singles match in Ice Ribbon. Tsukushi received another shot at the ICE×∞ Championship on March 12, 2016, but was again defeated, this time by Hamuko Hoshi. On May 22, Tsukushi made a special appearance for All Japan Pro Wrestling (AJPW), wrestling in a tag team match, where she and Mochi Miyagi were defeated by Maya Yukihi and Risa Sera. Also in May, Tsukushi took part in Pro Wrestling Wave's 2016 Catch the Wave tournament. She finished her round-robin block with a record of two wins and one loss, tying with Mika Iida and Melanie Cruise. She was eliminated from the tournament after being defeated by Iida in a three-way playoff match. Her match with Iida was later chosen as the tournament's best match. On September 19, Tsukushi won the International Ribbon Tag Team Championship for the seventh time, when she and Hiiragi Kurumi, billed collectively as "This is Ice Ribbon", defeated Arisa Nakajima and Tsukasa Fujimoto for the title. They lost the title to Wave Tag Team Champions Misaki Ohata and Ryo Mizunami in their first defense on October 9. On November 3, Tsukushi challenged Tsukasa Fujimoto for the ICE×∞ Championship. The match ended in a 30-minute time limit draw, which resulted in the title being held up. Tsukushi eventually made it to the semifinals of a tournament to crown the new champion, before losing to Fujimoto on December 31. On March 26, 2017, Tsukushi and Kurumi regained the International Ribbon Tag Team Championship from Ohata and Mizunami. They were stripped of the title on May 28, after their third title defense against Hamuko Hoshi and Mochi Miyagi ended in a twenty-minute time limit draw. Tsukushi and Kurumi regained the vacant title on June 11 by defeating the mother-daughter team of Hamuko Hoshi and Ibuki Hoshi. They were again stripped of the title on September 9 due to Tsukushi's arrest and subsequent inactivity from wrestling. On September 20, Ice Ribbon announced that Tsukushi was going on an indefinite hiatus from wrestling and would work for the company behind the scenes for the time being. Tsukushi had been scheduled to play a large role in Manami Toyota's upcoming retirement event, but was pulled from the show because of the incident.

Tsukushi returned to the ring at Ice Ribbon year-end event, RibbonMania 2017, on December 31, 2017, where she was defeated by Tsukasa Fujimoto.

Tsukushi has trained fellow professional wrestlers Nao Ishikawa and Yuki Mashiro.

== 2017 arrest ==
On July 23, 2017, Dave Meltzer reported that Tsukushi had been arrested for allegedly trying to stab fellow wrestler Kagetsu. That same day, Tsukushi was scheduled to wrestle at a Dream Joshi Puroresu event in Tokyo, but was pulled from the event due to "poor physical condition". The following day, Ice Ribbon held a press conference to announce that a 19-year old Ice Ribbon wrestler had been arrested on the night of July 22 in Saitama Prefecture for a fight, where a 25-year old wrestler not belonging to the promotion was injured. The arrested wrestler's name was withheld due to her being "underage", while the victim's name was withheld by their own request. The victim was described as a friend and a longtime mentor of the arrested wrestler. Tsukushi was identified as the arrested wrestler at a press conference on September 6, where she apologized for the incident.

== Championships and accomplishments ==
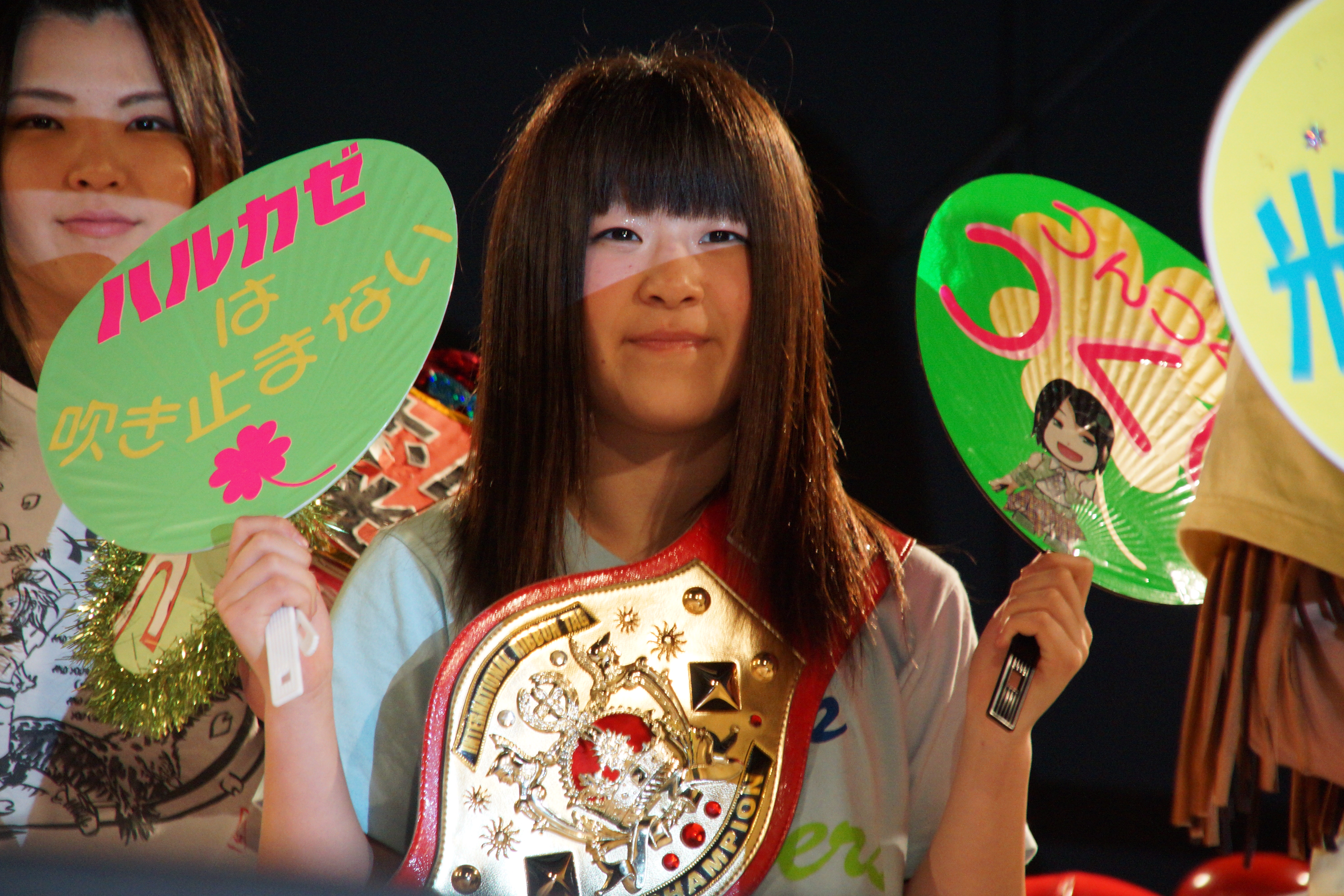
Tsukushi as an International Ribbon Tag Team Champion in April 2012

- DDT Pro-Wrestling
  - Ironman Heavymetalweight Championship (1 time)
- Ice Ribbon
  - ICE×60 Championship (2 times)
  - International Ribbon Tag Team Championship (10 times) – with Aoi Kizuki (1), Emi Sakura (1), Kurumi/Hiiragi Kurumi (4), Mio Shirai (1) and Tsukasa Fujimoto (3),
  - IW19 Championship (3 times)
  - ICE×60 Championship League (2013)
  - IW19 Championship Tournament (2011)
  - Ice Ribbon Year-End Award (2 times)
    - Best Bout Award (2016) vs. Tsukasa Fujimoto on November 3
    - Best Tag Team Award (2019) with Tsukasa Fujimoto
- JWP Joshi Puroresu
  - JWP Tag League the Best (2014) – with Rabbit Miu
- Pro Wrestling Illustrated
  - Ranked No. 118 of the top 150 female wrestlers in the PWI Women's 150 in 2021
- Pro Wrestling Wave
  - Catch the Wave Award (1 time)
    - Best Bout Award (2016) vs. Mika Iida on May 3
- Reina X World / Reina Joshi Puroresu
  - Reina World Tag Team Championship (1 time) – with Aoi Kizuki
