= Hamuko Hoshi =

Japanese professional wrestler (born 1982)

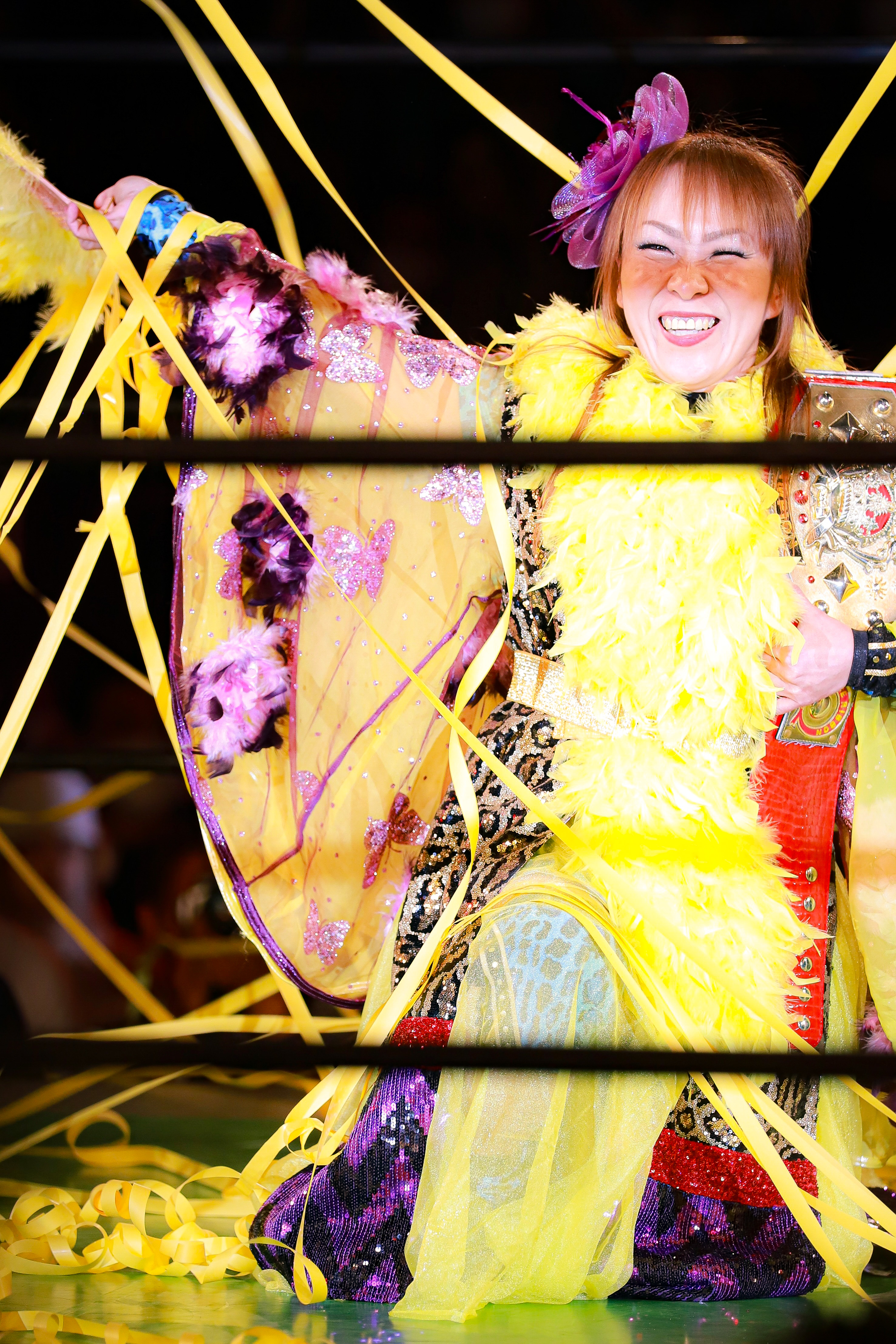
- Hoshi in June 2023

Personal information
- Born: October 19, 1982 (age 43) Iwamizawa, Hokkaido, Japan
- Family: Ibuki Hoshi (daughter)

Professional wrestling career
- Ring name(s): Hamuko Hoshi; Kizuki-fu Hamuko
- Billed height: 1.50 m (4 ft 11 in)
- Billed weight: 62 kg (137 lb)
- Trained by: Emi Sakura
- Debut: April 12, 2008

Hamuko Hoshi (星 ハム子, Hoshi Hamuko; born October 19, 1982) is a Japanese professional wrestler, currently working for the Ice Ribbon promotion. She is also a former two-time ICE×∞ Champion and a four-time International Ribbon Tag Team Champion. She also makes regular appearances for the World Woman Pro-Wrestling Diana promotion.

== Professional wrestling career ==
=== Ice Ribbon (2008–present) ===
Trained by Emi Sakura, Hoshi made her professional wrestling debut for her Ice Ribbon promotion on April 12, 2008, wrestling Makoto to a three-minute time limit draw. Billed as an exhibition match, Hoshi wrestled several more three-minute matches during the next month, before making her "official" debut on May 11, losing to Kazumi Shimouna. She picked up her first win on July 14, defeating Haruna Akagi. On December 7, Hoshi first made her debut for NEO Japan Ladies Pro Wrestling, which had a close relationship with Ice Ribbon, and later that same day for JWP Joshi Puroresu. During the next two years, she would make semi-regular appearances for NEO. On May 4, 2009, Hoshi received a chance to wrestle her idol, freelancer Yumiko Hotta, at an Ice Ribbon event, losing the match in just four minutes. During 2009, Hoshi, Haruna Akagi and Kazumi Shimouna formed the Zasso Girls stable.

On November 23, 2009, Hoshi received her first title shot, when she and Kazumi Shimouna unsuccessfully challenged Emi Sakura and Kaori Yoneyama for the International Ribbon Tag Team Championship. On January 4, 2010, Hoshi won the International Ribbon Tag Team Championship, when she and Hiroyo Matsumoto defeated Mai Ichii and Nanae Takahashi for the vacant title. The team, known collectively as the "Meat Monsters", made its first successful title defense on January 23 against Kazumi Shimouna and Tsukasa Fujimoto, with Hoshi pinning Fujimoto for the win. As a result, she was granted a shot at Fujimoto's ICE×60 Championship, Ice Ribbon's top title, but was unable to dethrone the defending champion on February 6. On February 20, Hoshi and Matsumoto lost the International Ribbon Tag Team Championship to Passion Red (Kazumi Shimouna and Nanae Takahashi). On October 10, Hoshi teamed with Sayaka Obihiro to unsuccessfully attempt to regain the title from Emi Sakura and Nanae Takahashi. On December 11, Hoshi received her first shot at the Triangle Ribbon Championship in a match, where Tsukasa Fujimoto defeated Kazumi Shimouna to become the new champion. The following day, she unsuccessfully challenged Command Bolshoi for the ICE×60 Championship at a JWP event.

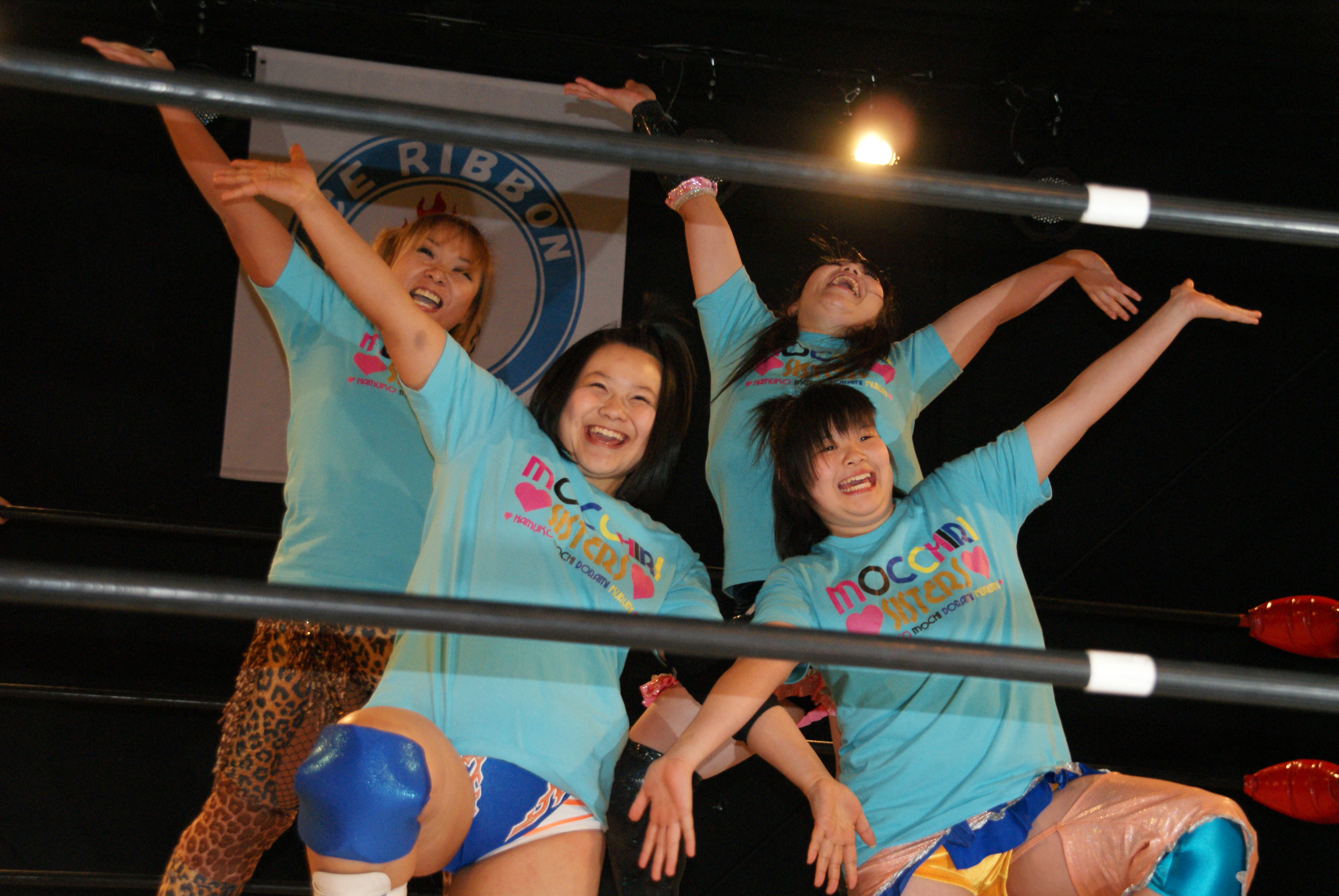
Hoshi with the rest of the Mocchiri Family in January 2012

On May 3, 2011, Hoshi was defeated by the recently debuted Mochi Miyagi. Afterwards, the two formed a new tag team named "Team Sexy", making their debut as a team on May 5 at GoldenRibbon 2011 in a losing effort against the team of Maki Narumiya and Miyako Matsumoto. After being renamed "Lovely Butchers", Hoshi and Miyagi went on a winning streak, which culminated in them defeating Emi Sakura and Ray for the International Ribbon Tag Team Championship on June 1. Lovely Butchers made their first successful title defense just three days later, defeating the all-male team of Keita Yano and Tsuyoshi Kikuchi. On June 5, Hoshi made her debut for Oz Academy, teaming with Sakura Hirota in a tag team match, where they were defeated by Miyako Morino and Tsukasa Fujimoto. After a reign of ten days, Hoshi and Miyagi lost the International Ribbon Tag Team Championship to another all-male team, Choun Shiryu and Makoto Oishi. Hoshi and Miyagi regained the title from Shiryu and Oishi on August 6 to become the first two-time International Ribbon Tag Team Champions. However, their second reign was even shorter than their first as they lost the title to Emi Sakura and Makoto just seven days later. Shortly afterwards, Makoto left Ice Ribbon, which led to the promotion vacating the International Ribbon Tag Team Championship and putting together a tournament to crown the new champions. In the first round of the tournament on September 24, Lovely Butchers defeated the team of Gomu Ningen and Kappa Kozou. Later that same day, Hoshi and Miyagi were defeated in the semifinals by Dash Chisako and Sendai Sachiko, who went on to become the new champions. On December 31, Hoshi and Miyagi formed the Mocchiri Family stable with Dorami Nagano and Kurumi, with the four losing to Hikaru Shida, Maki Narumiya, Meari Naito and Tsukushi in an eight-woman elimination tag team match in their first match together. On January 7, 2012, Hoshi and Miyagi unsuccessfully challenged Hikaru Shida and Maki Narumiya for the International Ribbon Tag Team Championship. On February 5 at Yokohama Ribbon, Hoshi and Miyagi defeated their stablemates Nagano and Kurumi in a tag team match. Three days later, Hoshi was defeated in a singles match by JWP wrestler Kayoko Haruyama, who afterwards joined the Mocchiri Family. On March 20 at Ice Ribbon March 2012, Hoshi and Haruyama defeated Mochi Miyagi and JWP wrestler Nana Kawasa in a tag team match, with Hoshi pinning her longtime tag team partner for the win.

With Miyagi taking a break from professional wrestling due to a knee injury suffered in March, Hoshi was forced to restart her singles career and started off by entering Pro Wrestling Wave's 2012 Catch the Wave tournament on April 30. Wrestling in the "Power" round-robin block, Hoshi picked up wins over Ryo Mizunami and Aya Yuki, but lost her other two matches against Ayako Hamada and Sawako Shimono, and was, as a result, overtaken in the standings by Mizunami, who advanced to the semifinals of the tournament. At the conclusion of the tournament, Hoshi was awarded both the Best Performance and the Fighting Spirit Awards. Back in Ice Ribbon, Hoshi picked up a big singles win over Tsukasa Fujimoto on May 6. On June 17, Hoshi faced former tag team partner Hiroyo Matsumoto in another big match and, although she lost, she came out after the main event of the show to challenge ICE×60 Champion Hikaru Shida. Shida accepted the challenge, but in order for the match to be contested for the title, Hoshi was forced to drop 5 kg (11 lb) in order to pass the 60 kg (130 lb) weight limit. On June 30, Hoshi pinned Shida in a tag team match, where she teamed with Kayoko Haruyama and Shida with Tsukasa Fujimoto. Weighing in at 58.2 kg (128 lb) at the previous day's public weigh-in, Hoshi received her title shot on July 15 at Sapporo Ribbon 2012, but was defeated by Shida. On July 28, Hoshi reunited with Kayoko Haruyama to take part in the JRibbon Natsu Onna Kettei Tournament, co-produced by Ice Ribbon and JWP. However, the team was eliminated in their first round match by Arisa Nakajima and Hikaru Shida. On September 29, Hoshi unsuccessfully challenged Hailey Hatred for the Triangle Ribbon Championship in a three-way match, which also included Aki Shizuku. Afterwards, she formed a new partnership with Hatred. On October 12, Hoshi defeated Shida in the finals of the 4th 19 O'Clock Girls ProWrestling Tournament to become the number one contender to the IW19 Championship. On October 19, her thirtieth birthday, Hoshi defeated Aki Shizuku to win the IW19 Championship, her first singles title in professional wrestling. On November 28, Hoshi made her debut for the World Woman Pro-Wrestling Diana promotion, losing to Piyota Mask. At an Ice Ribbon event later that same day, Hoshi and Hailey Hatred defeated Hikaru Shida and Tsukasa Fujimoto to win both the International Ribbon Tag Team Championship and the Reina World Tag Team Championship, the latter title owned by the Reina X World promotion. On December 18, Hoshi returned to World Woman Pro-Wrestling Diana, challenging Yumiko Hotta to the first match between the two in over three and a half years. The following day, Hoshi and Hatred lost both of their tag team titles in their first defense to the team of Kyoko Kimura and Sayaka Obihiro. After the match, Hotta accepted Hoshi's earlier challenge for a match between the two. On December 28, Hoshi defeated Sayaka Obihiro for her first successful defense of the IW19 Championship. Three days later at RibbonMania 2012, Hoshi wrestled Yumiko Hotta to a fifteen-minute time limit draw. On January 10, Hoshi and Hotta entered a tournament to determine the inaugural Diana Tag Team Champions, defeating the team of Manami Toyota and Mima Shimoda in their first round match. Eight days later, Hoshi and Hotta were eliminated from the tournament in the semifinals by the team of Kaoru Ito and Tomoko Watanabe, when Hotta was disqualified for the assaulting the referee. Following the tournament, Hoshi continued making regular appearances for Diana as a member of Hotta's villainous Bousou-gun stable. After the ICE×60 Championship was vacated, following Maki Narumiya being sidelined with an injury, Hoshi entered a round-robin tournament to determine the new champion, wrestling Miyako Matsumoto to a ten-minute time limit draw in her opening match on January 19. After a loss to Kurumi on January 30, Hoshi finished her round-robin block with a win over Tsukasa Fujimoto on February 9, finishing at three points, tied with Miyako Matsumoto. On February 16, Hoshi was eliminated from the tournament, after being defeated by Matsumoto in a tiebreaker match. On May 11, Hoshi celebrated her fifth anniversary in professional wrestling by producing her own event for Ice Ribbon, which saw her lose to Hailey Hatred in a main event singles match. The event also featured appearances from Hoshi's now retired Zasso Girls partners Haruna Akagi and Kazumi Shimouna as well as a surprise appearance by her daughter. On June 22, 19 O'Clock Girls ProWrestling held its first event in six months, during which Hoshi lost the IW19 Championship to Tsukasa Fujimoto in her second defense, ending her reign at 246 days, the longest in the title's history. On September 1, Hoshi returned to Pro Wrestling Wave to take part in the 2013 Dual Shock Wave tournament, where she teamed with Sawako Shimono. The team won only one match in the tournament, over Hoshi's fellow Ice Ribbon workers Hikaru Shida and Tsukasa Fujimoto, and were eliminated after their third loss on September 29 as per pre-tournament stipulations. After the ICE×60 Championship was renamed the ICE×∞ Championship and its weight limit was abolished, Hoshi received another shot at the title on December 1, but again failed in her attempt to win the title for the first time by losing to the defending champion, Tsukasa Fujimoto. Six days later, Hoshi also received a shot at the International Ribbon Tag Team Championship, but she and Kurumi were defeated by the defending champions, Fujimoto and Hikaru Shida.

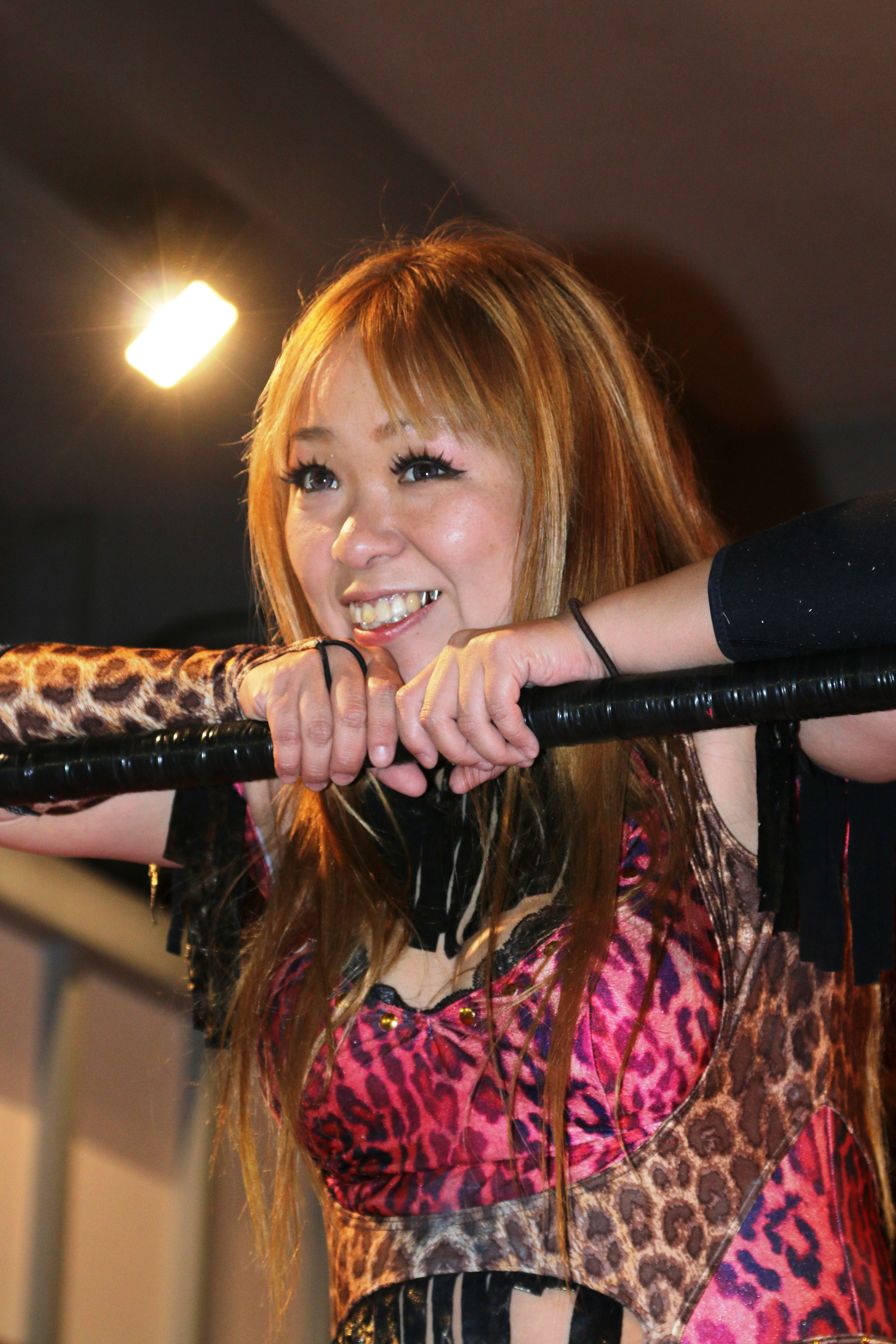
Hoshi in May 2015

After being sidelined for two years, Mochi Miyagi wrestled her return match on March 30, 2014, losing to Hoshi in a singles match. On June 7 at Ice Ribbon's eighth anniversary event, the reunited Lovely Butchers unsuccessfully challenged .STAP (Maki Narumiya and Risa Sera) for the International Ribbon Tag Team Championship. Hoshi and Miyagi received their next title shot a year later as part of Ice Ribbon's ninth anniversary week, but were defeated by Shishunki (Mio Shirai and Tsukushi) on June 24, 2015. On December 31 at RibbonMania 2015, Hoshi defeated Aoi Kizuki to win the ICE×∞ Championship for the first time. On January 9, 2016, Hoshi defeated longtime tag team partner Mochi Miyagi to make her first successful title defense. Her second defense took place on March 12, when she defeated Tsukushi. On March 21, Hoshi lost the title to Risa Sera in her third defense. On June 11, 2017, Hoshi teamed with her debuting daughter Ibuki in a decision match for the vacant International Ribbon Tag Team Championship, where they were defeated by Hiiragi Kurumi and Tsukushi.

== Other media ==
In December 2014, Hoshi and Mochi Miyagi released a gravure DVD together, titled Lovely Monster (ラブリーモンスター, Raburī Monsutā).

== Personal life ==
Hoshi is married and has a child, a daughter named Ibuki Hoshi Hoshi Ibuki (星夢喜, Hoshi Ibuki), born before the start of her professional wrestling career. Ibuki Hoshi made her professional wrestling debut on June 11, 2017.

== Championships and accomplishments ==
- Ice Ribbon
  - ICE×∞ Championship (2 times)
  - International Ribbon Tag Team Championship (9 times) – with Hailey Hatred (1), Hiroyo Matsumoto (1), Ibuki Hoshi (1), Makoto (3) and Mochi Miyagi (3)
  - IW19 Championship (3 times)
  - 4th 19 O'Clock Girls ProWrestling Tournament (2012)
  - Ice Ribbon Year-End Award (1 time)
    - Best Tag Team Award (2018) with Mochi Miyagi
- Pro Wrestling Wave
  - Catch the Wave Award (3 times)
    - Best Performance Award (2012)
    - Fighting Spirit Award (2012, 2019) (Note: In 2019, Hoshi won the Fighting Spirit Award alongside Haruka Umesaki and Maria.)
- Reina X World
  - Reina World Tag Team Championship (1 time) – with Hailey Hatred
