= Chii Tomiya =

Japanese professional wrestler (born 1991)

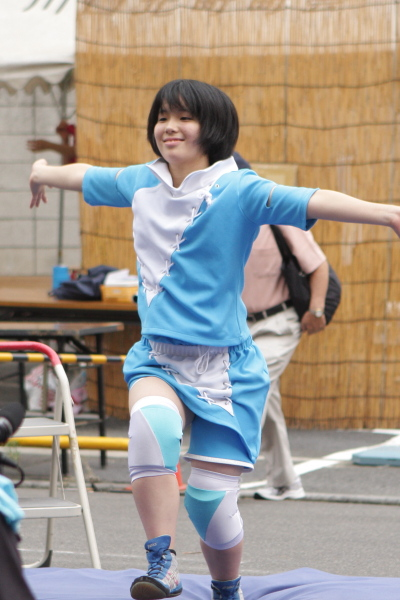

Personal information
- Born: 25 April 1991 (age 35) Utsunomiya, Tochigi, Japan

Professional wrestling career
- Ring name(s): Akubi; Chii Tomiya; Micro; Micro Yoneyama; Mini Tomato
- Billed height: 1.42 m (4 ft 8 in)
- Billed weight: 45 kg (99 lb)
- Trained by: Emi Sakura
- Debut: 7 October 2008

Chii Tomiya (都宮 ちい, Tomiya Chii; born 25 April 1991) is a Japanese professional wrestler, best known for her work in the Ice Ribbon promotion. Trained by Emi Sakura, Tomiya made her debut for Ice Ribbon in October 2008 and during the next three years went on to become a one-time International Ribbon Tag Team and Internet Wrestling 19 Champion, while also holding DDT Pro-Wrestling's Ironman Heavymetalweight Championship once. In August 2011, Tomiya left Ice Ribbon and became a freelancer, adopting the new ring name Micro (ミクロ, Mikuro) in the process. As a freelancer, she would most notably work for the Reina X World promotion, where she wrestled as the masked character Mini Tomato (ミニトマト, Mini Tomato). In September 2013, she signed with the new World Pro-Wrestling Association (WPA) promotion, adopting the new ring name Akubi in the process. Standing at only 1.42 m (4 ft 8 in), she is one of the shortest wrestlers in all of puroresu.

== Professional wrestling career ==
=== Ice Ribbon (2008–2011) ===
On 11 September 2008, Tomiya moved from her hometown of Utsunomiya, Tochigi to Tokyo to begin training professional wrestling under Emi Sakura. Sakura gave her the ring name Chii Tomiya by combining the Japanese word chi (ち, chi), which indicates smallness or quickness, with the name of her hometown Utsunomiya (宇都宮市, Utsunomiya-shi). After less than a month of training, Tomiya made her debut for Sakura's Ice Ribbon promotion on 7 October, losing to her trainer 3–0 in a five-minute exhibition match. Tomiya made her "official" debut on 18 October, losing to Yuki Ueda. For the first months of her career, Tomiya wrestled several matches against Makoto, always ending up on the losing side. Finally, on 18 January 2009, Tomiya picked up her first win, pinning Yuki Ueda in a tag team match, where she teamed with Minori Makiba and Ueda with Yoshiko Tamura. On 7 February, Tomiya faced one of her idols, NEO Japan Ladies Pro Wrestling representative Tanny Mouse, in a losing effort. The match eventually led to a partnership between the two. On 22 March, Tomiya made her debut for NEO Japan Ladies Pro Wrestling, during which she won her first championship, when she surprised Tanny Mouse and pinned her after a match to win DDT Pro-Wrestling's Ironman Heavymetalweight Championship, taking advantage of the title's rule, where a champion could be pinned anytime, anywhere. She would lose the title to Cherry later that same day. On 3 June, Tomiya defeated nine other wrestlers to win a battle royal, her first accomplishment in Ice Ribbon. During 2009, Tomiya continued regularly wrestling Makoto, including losing to her on 5 August in a match to determine the number one contender to Ice Ribbon's top title, the ICE×60 Championship. Tomiya would eventually receive her first shot at the title on 23 October, but was defeated by defending champion Emi Sakura. On 14 November, Tomiya formed the tag team named Miniature Dachs with Riho, with the two defeating Hikari Minami and Mai Ichii in their first match together.

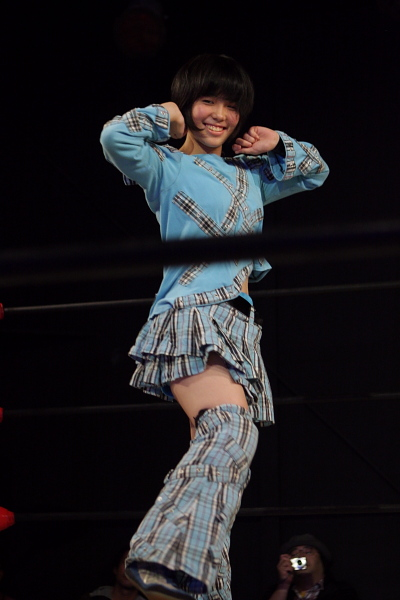
Tomiya in September 2010

As a sign of her growing status in Ice Ribbon, on 16 January 2010, Tomiya was chosen as the exhibition opponent for two debuting wrestlers, Kurumi and Tsukushi, both of whom would join Ice Ribbon full-time later in the year. On 23 January Tomiya and Riho were defeated by Miyako Matsumoto and Nanae Takahashi in a hardcore match, a match type rarely used in Ice Ribbon. While the match signaled the end of Tomiya's partnership with Riho, it was only the beginning of a storyline rivalry between Tomiya and Miyako Matsumoto. On 17 June, Tomiya unsuccessfully challenged Matsumoto for the Triangle Ribbon Championship in a three-way match, which also included Tsukasa Fujimoto. On 14 and 17 July, Tomiya scored back-to-back singles match victories over Matsumoto and her new tag team partner, deathmatch wrestler Jun Kasai. The victories led to a match on 19 July, where Tomiya teamed with JWP Joshi Puroresu wrestler Command Bolshoi to unsuccessfully challenge Matsumoto and Kasai for the International Ribbon Tag Team Championship. Afterwards, Tomiya recruited deathmatch wrestler Isami Kodaka as her new tag team partner, and on 7 August, the two defeated Matsumoto and Kasai to become the new International Ribbon Tag Team Champions. They would go on to lose the title to Gentaro and Mai Ichii on 12 September. On 30 October, Tomiya unsuccessfully challenged former partner Command Bolshoi for the ICE×60 Championship. On 12 November, Tomiya, along with Emi Sakura, Hikaru Shida, Makoto, Sayaka Obihiro and Tsukasa Fujimoto, made an appearance at a press conference held by Smash to promote Sakura's upcoming debut for the promotion. The following month in Ice Ribbon, Tomiya began regularly teaming with former rival Makoto. On 24 December, Tomiya made her debut for Smash at Happening Eve, where she teamed with Hikari Minami and Kushida in a six-person tag team match, where they were defeated by Isami Kodaka, Makoto and Yusuke Kodama.

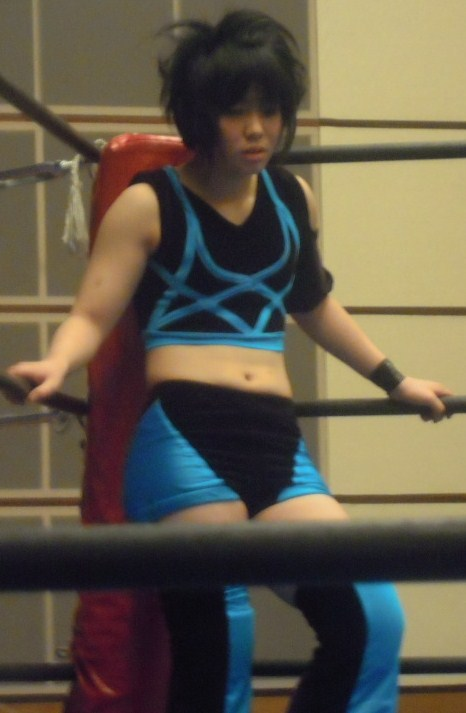
Tomiya in her "Black & Black" persona in February 2011

On 4 January 2011, Tomiya went through a complete character overhaul, debuting a new look, which included a black and blue two-piece outfit, a new entrance theme and the nickname "Black & Black", with Tomiya now becoming a full-blown villain. On 15 January, Tomiya, along with Hikari Minami, Kurumi and Tsukushi became a part of Makoto's new Heisei YTR stable. After pinning ICE×60, International Ribbon Tag Team and Triangle Ribbon Champion Tsukasa Fujimoto in a non-title match on 16 February, Tomiya was granted a shot at the ICE×60 Championship seven days later, but was again unsuccessful in her challenge. On 21 March, Tomiya ended her long rivalry with Miyako Matsumoto, when she and Kazuhiko Ogasawara were defeated in a hardcore match by Matsumoto and Jun Kasai. On 5 May, at Golden Ribbon 2011, Tomiya unsuccessfully challenged Sendai Girls' Pro Wrestling representative Kagetsu for the JWP Junior and Princess of Pro-Wrestling Championships. Eight days later, Tomiya unsuccessfully challenged Tsukushi for the Internet Wrestling 19 (IW19) Championship at an 19 O'Clock Girls ProWrestling event. After Hikari Minami became the new IW19 Champion, she offered Tomiya another shot at the title, which led to a match on 1 June at 19 O'Clock Girls ProWrestling's first anniversary event, where Tomiya defeated her to become the third IW19 Champion. Afterwards, Tomiya named her friend Makoto her first challenger for the title, which led to the two agreeing to a "best of nine" series. However, the series had to be cancelled, when Makoto was on June 8 sidelined with a neck injury. Instead, Tomiya went on to make her first defense on 24 June, defeating Hikaru Shida. On 2 July, Tomiya defeated Mochi Miyagi in the finals of a four-woman tournament to earn the right to represent Ice Ribbon in Smash's Diva Championship tournament. Five days later, Tomiya returned to Smash, confronting her first round opponent, Makoto, at a press conference and accusing her of turning her back on Ice Ribbon in favor of Smash. On 15 July at Smash.19, Tomiya was eliminated from the Smash Diva Championship tournament by Makoto. Back in Ice Ribbon, on 22 July, an IW19 Championship match between Tomiya and Makoto ended in a nineteen-minute time limit draw. While the rules of the IW19 Championship stated that the champion retains the title in the event of a time limit draw, Tomiya instead chose to vacate the title afterwards. The reason for this was revealed the following month, when Tomiya announced that she, like Makoto, had decided to leave Ice Ribbon and try to broaden her capabilities as a professional wrestler by turning into a freelancer and opening doors to other promotions. Tomiya wrestled her final Ice Ribbon match on 28 August, when she unsuccessfully challenged Hikari Minami for the ICE×60 Championship.

=== Freelancing (2011–2013) ===
After leaving Ice Ribbon and becoming a freelancer, Tomiya dropped her old ring name out of respect towards Emi Sakura and her former home promotion, and adopted the new ring name "Micro". She made her first appearance as Micro on September 4, 2011, at an event held by the Happy Hour!! promotion, where she faced Keiko Aono in a losing effort. On 11 September, Micro made her debut for the JWP promotion, teaming with Leon in a tag team match, where they were defeated by Kazuki and Sachie Abe. Later that same day, Micro appeared at a press conference, where she announced Pro Wrestling Wallaby as her new home promotion. On 10 October, Micro made an appearance at a special JWP event, produced by Kaori Yoneyama, where she, working under the ring name "Micro Yoneyama", teamed with Bolshoi Yoneyama and Rabbit Yoneyama to defeat Jaiko Ishikawa in a three-on-one handicap match. Later that same event, Micro took part in a battle royal for the World Cosplay Championship, which was won by Misaki Ohata. On 13 November, Micro wrestled her first singles match for JWP, defeating Moon Mizuki. On 29 December, Micro faced Makoto at a Mr. Gannosuke-produced event in an "Ice Ribbon Alumni Showdown", which was won by Makoto. On 9 January 2012, Micro returned to JWP, defeating masu-me in a singles match. Six days later, Micro made her debut for the Osaka Joshi Pro Wrestling promotion, unsuccessfully challenging Sawako Shimono for the JWP Junior and Princess of Pro-Wrestling Championships. On 20 April, Pro Wrestling Wallaby publicly fired Micro for "unprofessional behaviour" and "inappropriate remarks". On 17 June, Micro returned to JWP, unsuccessfully challenging Rabbit Miu for the JWP Junior and Princess of Pro-Wrestling Championships. On 7 July, Micro made her debut for Reina X World, when she teamed with Puchi Tomato in a tag team match, where they were defeated by Arisa Nakajima and Manami Katsu. At the promotion's following event on 16 July, Micro defeated Tomato in what was billed as a "tryout" match. At Reina X World's event on 26 August, Micro worked under a mask, similar to that of Puchi Tomato, and the ring name Mini Tomato in a match, where she defeated Charlie Simone Aussie. On 9 September, Micro, as Mini Tomato, main evented her first Reina X World event, where she and Aki Kanbayashi defeated Leon and Manami Katsu.

=== World Pro-Wrestling Association (2013–present) ===
In February 2013, Micro, along with all other Japanese wrestlers affiliated with Reina X World, left the promotion. On 20 September, the group announced they were forming a new promotion, named World Pro-Wrestling Association (WPA). At the promotion's inaugural event on 31 December, Micro debuted under the new ring name Akubi (Japanese for yawn; written in Roman alphabets and stylized in all capital letters), pinning Bambi in a tag team match, where she and La Malcriada defeated Bambi and Tsubasa Kuragaki. She continued using the ring name Micro, when making appearances outside of WPA.

== Championships and accomplishments ==
- DDT Pro-Wrestling
  - Ironman Heavymetalweight Championship (1 time)
- Ice Ribbon
  - International Ribbon Tag Team Championship (1 time) – with Isami Kodaka
  - IW19 Championship (1 time)
  - Smash Diva Championship Participation Tournament (2011)
