= Stardom to the World 2026 =

2026 World Wonder Ring Stardom event

- Promotional poster of the event
- Promotion: World Wonder Ring Stardom
- Date: September 12, 2026
- City: Yokohama, Japan
- Venue: Yokohama Budokan
- Attendance: 2,009

Event chronology
← Previous; 5 Star Grand Prix 2026	Next → Path of Thunder

Stardom to the World chronology
← Previous; 2025	Next → —

Stardom to the World 2026 (世界へのスターダム2026, Sekai e no sutādamu 2026) was a professional wrestling event promoted by World Wonder Ring Stardom. The event took place on September 12, 2026, in Yokohama at the Yokohama Budokan.

== Production ==
=== Background ===
The show featured professional wrestling matches that result from scripted storylines, where wrestlers portray villains, heroes, or less distinguishable characters in the scripted events that build tension and culminate in a wrestling match or series of matches.

=== Event ===
The event started with the preshow confrontation between Saya Iida and Matoi Hamabe, and Lady C and Kiyoka Kotatsu, solded with the victory of the latters.

In the first main card bout, Utami Hayashishita, Waka Tsukiyama and Hanako picked up a victory in a three-way trios confrontation also involving the teams of Rina Yamashita, Itsuki Aoki and Saori Anou, and Fukigen Death, Ruaka and Konami. Next up, Hazuki, Koguma and Fuwa-chan outmatched Maki Itoh, Kikyo Furusawa and Rian in six-woman tag team competition. The fourth match saw Bea Priestley defeat Anne Kanaya in singles competition. In the fifth bout, Syuri and Hina picked up a victory over Rina and Azusa Inaba in tag team competition. Next up, Ranna Yagami defeated Akira Kurogane to secure the tenth consecutive defense of the Future of Stardom Championship in that respective reign. In the seventh match, Thekla, Skye Blue and Julia Hart of All Elite Wrestling defeated Natsupoi, Aya Sakura and Yuna Mizumori to secure the first defense of the Artist of Stardom Championship in that respective reign. After the bout concluded, they were challenged by Hazuki, Koguma and Fuwa-chan. Next up, AZM and Miyu Amasaki defeated Saya Kamitani and Momo Watanabe to secure the third consecutive defense of the Goddesses of Stardom Championship in that respective reign. In the semi main event, Hanan defeated Ami Sohrei to secure the third consecutive defense of the Wonder of Stardom Championship in that respective reign. After the bout concluded, Ruaka challenged her to a title match.

In the main event, Suzu Suzuki defeated Natsuko Tora in a no disqualification bout to secure the second consecutive defense of the World of Stardom Championship in that respective reign.

== Results ==
No.	Results	Stipulations	Times
1^{P}	God's Eye (Lady C and Kiyoka Kotatsu) defeated Stars (Saya Iida and Matoi Hamabe) by pinfall	Tag team match	8:07
2	Utami Hayashishita, Waka Tsukiyama and Hanako defeated Mi Vida Loca (Rina Yamashita and Itsuki Aoki) and Saori Anou and H.A.T.E. (Fukigen Death, Ruaka and Konami) by pinfall	Three-way six-woman tag team match	8:00
3	FWC (Hazuki and Koguma) and Fuwa-chan defeated Itoh Respect Army (Maki Itoh, Kikyo Furusawa and Rian) by pinfall	Six-woman tag team match	8:30
4	Bea Priestley defeated Anne Kanaya by pinfall	Singles match	7:20
5	God's Eye (Syuri and Hina) defeated Devil Princess (Rina and Azusa Inaba) by pinfall	Tag team match	8:38
6	Ranna Yagami (c) defeated Akira Kurogane by pinfall	Singles match for the Future of Stardom Championship	12:56
7	Triangle Of Madness (Thekla, Skye Blue and Julia Hart) (c) defeated Cosmic Angels (Natsupoi, Aya Sakura and Yuna Mizumori) by pinfall	Six-woman tag team match for the Artist of Stardom Championship	13:32
8	02line (AZM and Miyu Amasaki) (c) defeated H.A.T.E. (Saya Kamitani and Momo Watanabe) by submission	Tag team match for the Goddesses of Stardom Championship	22:45
9	Hanan (c) defeated Ami Sohrei by pinfall	Singles match for the Wonder of Stardom Championship	16:52
10	Suzu Suzuki (c) defeated Natsuko Tora by pinfall	No disqualification match for the World of Stardom Championship	22:52
(c) / – the champion(s) heading into the match; P / – the match was broadcast on the pre-show
