= Stardom Crimson Nightmare 2026 =

2026 World Wonder Ring Stardom event

- Promotional poster of the event
- Promotion: World Wonder Ring Stardom
- Date: October 29, 2026
- City: Tokyo, Japan
- Venue: Ota City General Gymnasium
- Attendance: 1,994

Event chronology
← Previous; Path of Thunder	Next → Dream Queendom

Crimson Nightmare chronology
← Previous; 2025	Next → —

Stardom Crimson Nightmare 2026 (スターダムクリムゾンナイトメア2026, Sutādamukurimuzon'naitomea 2026) was a professional wrestling event promoted by World Wonder Ring Stardom. The event took place on October 29, 2026, in Tokyo, Japan, at the Ota City General Gymnasium.

== Production ==
=== Background ===
The show featured professional wrestling matches that result from scripted storylines, where wrestlers portrayed villains, heroes, or less distinguishable characters in the scripted events that built tension and culminated in a wrestling match or series of matches.

=== Event ===
The event started with the tag team confrontation between Mei Seira and Ema Maishima, and AZM and Miyu Amasaki, solded with the victory of the latters.

Next up, Maki Itoh, Kikyo Furusawa and Rian picked up a victory over the team of Syuri, Ami Sohrei, and Hina, and the team of Rina Yamashita, Itsuki Aoki, and Akira Kurogane in six-woman tag team competition. The third bout saw Saori Anou, Aya Sakura, Sayaka Kurara, and Anne Kanaya outmatch Lady C, Tomoka Inaba, Ranna Yagami, and Kiyoka Kotatsu in eight-woman tag team comoetition. Next up, Hanan, Saya Iida, Maika, Utami Hayashishita, Hanako, Waka Tsukiyama, Yuria Hime, and Matoi Hamabe representing Stars defeated H.A.T.E.'s Natsuko Tora, Momo Watanabe, Saya Kamitani, Konami, Bea Priestley, Rina, Ruaka, and Azusa Inaba in a stable-clash elimination tag team bout. In the semi main event, Shingo Takagi and Natsupoi defeated Hirooki Goto and Yuna Mizumori in tag team competition. This was one of the last pay-per-view bouts of Natsupoi's careeer who retired at the beginning of 2027.

In the main event, Suzu Suzuki defeated Starlight Kid to secure the third consecutive defense of the World of Stardom Championship in that respective reign.

== Results ==
No.	Results	Stipulations	Times
1	02line (AZM and Miyu Amasaki) defeated Neo Genesis (Mei Seira and Ema Maishima) by pinfall	Tag team match	8:13
2	Itoh Respect Army (Maki Itoh, Kikyo Furusawa and Rian) defeated God's Eye (Syuri, Ami Sohrei, and Hina) and Mi Vida Loca (Rina Yamashita, Itsuki Aoki, and Akira Kurogane) by pinfall	Three-way tag team match	9:56
3	Cosmic Angels (Saori Anou, Aya Sakura, Sayaka Kurara, and Anne Kanaya) defeated God's Eye (Lady C, Tomoka Inaba, Ranna Yagami, and Kiyoka Kotatsu) by pinfall	Eight-woman tag team match	11:08
4	Stars (Hanan, Saya Iida, Maika, Utami Hayashishita, Hanako, Waka Tsukiyama, Yuria Hime, and Matoi Hamabe) defeated H.A.T.E. (Natsuko Tora, Momo Watanabe, Saya Kamitani, Konami, Bea Priestley, Rina, Ruaka, and Azusa Inaba)	Sixteen-woman tag team elimination match	25:52
5	Shingo Takagi and Natsupoi defeated Hirooki Goto and Yuna Mizumori by pinfall	Intergender tag team match	17:25
6	Suzu Suzuki (c) defeated Starlight Kid by pinfall	Singles match for the World of Stardom Championship	23:06
(c) / – the champion(s) heading into the match

=== Elimination match ===
Eliminated	Wrestler	Eliminated by	Method of elimination	Times
1	Waka Tsukiyama	Azusa Inaba	Submitted to the Baba Killer #2	1:07
2	Yuria Hime	Rina	Pinned after the Pink Devil	6:03
3	Matoi Hamabe	Ruaka	Pinned after the Freezer Bomb	7:18
4	Azusa Inaba	Hanako	Thrown over the top rope	8:42
5	Konami	Saya Iida	Thrown over the top rope	11:33
6	Saya Iida	Saya Kamitani	Thrown over the top rope	7:18
7	Rina	Maika	Pinned after the Michinoku Driver II	13:20
8	Hanako	Hanan	Thrown over the top rope	14:23
9	Ruaka	Hanan	Pinned with the Seventeen	14:39
10	Saya Kamitani	Utami Hayashishita	Thrown over the top rope	17:32
11	Momo Watanabe	Utami Hayashishita	Thrown over the top rope	17:32
12	Utami Hayashishita	Bea Priestley	Pinned after the Queen's Landing	18:44
13	Bea Priestley	Maika	Pinned after a rolling lariat	19:54
14	Maika	Natsuko Tora	Pinned after a Swanton bomb	22:04
15	Natsuko Tora	Hanan	Pinned after a backdrop hold	25:52
Sole survivor	Hanan	—N/a		25:52
