= Stardom Path of Thunder 2026 =

2026 World Wonder Ring Stardom professional wrestling event

- Promotional poster of the event featuring Hanan and Hina
- Promotion: World Wonder Ring Stardom
- Date: October 18, 2026
- City: Utsunomiya, Japan
- Venue: Light Cube Utsunomiya
- Attendance: 792

Event chronology
← Previous; Stardom to the World	Next → Crimson Nightmare

Path of Thunder chronology
← Previous; 2025	Next → —

Stardom Path of Thunder 2026 (スターダム・パス・オブ・サンダー2026, sutadamu pasu obu sandā 2026) was a professional wrestling event promoted by World Wonder Ring Stardom. It took place on October 18, 2026, in Utsunomiya at the Light Cube Utsunomiya.

== Production ==
=== Background ===
The show featured professional wrestling matches that result from scripted storylines, where wrestlers portrayed villains, heroes, or less distinguishable characters in the scripted events that built tension and culminated in a wrestling match or series of matches.

=== Event ===
The event started with the tag confrontation between the teams of Saya Iida and Yuria Hime, and Saya Kamitani and Ruaka, solded with the victory of the latters. Next up, Syuri picked up a victory over Matoi Hamabe in singles competition. The third bout saw Ami Sohrei, Lady C, and Ranna Yagami outmatch Suzu Suzuki, Konami and Azusa Inaba in six-woman tag team competition. Next up, Maika and Hanako defeated Natsupoi and Saori Anou, and Maki Itoh and Kiyoka Kotatsu in three-way tag team competition. In the fifth bout, Yuna Mizumori and Aya Sakura defeated Kikyo Furusawa and Rian in tag team competition. Next up, Suzu Suzuki, Rina Yamashita, Itsuki Aoki, and Akira Kurogane outmatched Starlight Kid, Fuwa-chan, Hazuki and Koguma in eight-woman tag team competition. In the semi main event, Rina defeated Utami Hayashishita in singles competition.

In the main event, Hanan defeated Hina to secure the fifth consecutive defense of the Wonder of Stardom Championship in that respective reign.

== Results ==
No.	Results	Stipulations	Times
1	H.A.T.E. (Saya Kamitani and Ruaka) defeated Stars (Saya Iida and Yuria Hime) by pinfall	Tag team match	8:58
2	Syuri defeated Matoi Hamabe by submission	Singles match	11:31
3	God's Eye (Ami Sohrei, Lady C, and Ranna Yagami) defeated Suzu Suzuki and H.A.T.E. (Konami and Azusa Inaba) by pinfall	Six-woman tag team match	9:54
4	Hai High Mate (Maika and Hanako) defeated Natsu&Saori (Natsupoi and Saori Anou), and Maki Itoh and Kiyoka Kotatsu by pinfall	Three-way tag team match	7:07
5	Cosmic Angels (Yuna Mizumori and Aya Sakura) defeated Itoh Respect Army (Kikyo Furusawa and Rian) by pinfall	Tag team match	8:42
6	Mi Vida Loca (Suzu Suzuki, Rina Yamashita, Itsuki Aoki, and Akira Kurogane) defeated Starlight Kid, Fuwa-chan, and FWC (Hazuki and Koguma) by pinfall	Eight-woman tag team match	8:45
7	Rina defeated Utami Hayashishita by pinfall	Singles match	18:07
8	Hanan (c) defeated Hina by pinfall	Singles match for the Wonder of Stardom Championship	19:40
(c) / – the champion(s) heading into the match
