= Sae (wrestler) =

Japanese professional wrestler

Personal information
- Born: August 21, 1995 (age 30) Nagoya, Japan

Professional wrestling career
- Ring name(s): Megumi Nomura; Sae Nomura; Sae
- Billed height: 168 cm (5 ft 6 in)
- Billed weight: 62 kg (137 lb)
- Trained by: Shigeru
- Debut: 2017

Megumi Nomura (野村めぐみ, Nomura Megumi) better known by her ring names Sae Nomura and Sae is a Japanese professional wrestler currently working as a freelancer and is best known for her tenure with the Japanese promotion Seadlinnng where she is a former Beyond the Sea Tag Team Champion.

== Professional wrestling career ==
=== Seadlinnng (2018–2022) ===
Nomura is best known for her time in Seadlinnng. She made her first appearance at SEAdLINNNG 1st Nagoya on March 18, 2018, where she fell short to Yoshiko in singles competition. She won her first championship, the Beyond the Sea Tag Team Championship at SEAdLINNNG Luckiest 2019 on March 20, where she alongside Arisa Nakajima defeated Himeka Arita and Miyuki Takase for the vacant titles. She took part in a signature event promoted by the company, the 2018 "ULTRA777 U-21 Tag" tournament in which she teamed up with Saki Akai and fell short to Best Friends (Arisa Nakajima and Tsukasa Fujimoto) in the second rounds. Nomura competed in various notable events of the promotion, such as the anniversary phases. At SEAdLINNNG 7th Anniversary on August 17, 2022, she competed in a battle royal won by Kaori Yoneyama and also involving Chikayo Nagashima, Itsuki Aoki, Kyoko Inoue, Saki and Yuu.

=== Pro Wrestling Wave (2018–present) ===
Nomura made her first appearance in Pro Wrestling Wave at WAVE Nagoya WAVE ~Kin Shachi~ Vol. 17 on March 25, 2018, where she competed in a captain's fall tag team match in which she teamed up with Yuki Miyazaki, Sakura Hirota and Fairy Nihonbashi in a losing effort against Hiroe Nagahama, Misaki Ohata, Moeka Haruhi and Rina Yamashita.

She competed in various of the promotion's signature events such as the Catch the Wave in which she made her first appearance at the 2022 edition where she placed herself in the "Kick Block", scoring a total of one point after going against Nagisa Nozaki, Hanako Nakamori and Hikari Shimizu. Nomura chased for various championships promoted by the company. At WAVE Nagoya WAVE ~ Kin Shachi Vol. 21 on May 3, 2021, she teamed up with Konatsu to unsuccessfully challenge Itsuki Aoki and Rin Kadokura for the Wave Tag Team Championship. At WAVE Survival Dance ~ Regina Challenge on October 24, 2022, she competed in a battle royal to determine the number one contender for the Wave Single Championship won by Yuki Miyazaki and also involving notable opponents such as Akane Fujita, Asuka, Cherry, Haruka Umesaki, Kakeru Sekiguchi, Kohaku, Miyako Matsumoto, Rina Amikura, Risa Sera, Suzu Suzuki, Yuko Sakurai and many others. She also took part in various other match gimmicks, such as a two-out-of-three falls match in which she teamed up with Saki and Nagisa Nozaki to defeat Hibiscus Mii, Sakura Hirota and Yuu.

=== Independent scene (2017–present) ===
Due to mainly being a freelancer, Nomura is known for competing in various Japanese independent scene promotions. At Oz Academy Flower Bloom In Yokohama on September 17, 2018, she teamed up with Misaki Ohata in a losing effort against Ozaki-gun (Saori Anou and Yumi Ohka). At a house show promoted by Professional Wrestling Just Tap Out on April 16, 2022, she teamed up with Maya Yukihi and Saori Anou to defeat Aoi, rhythm and Tomoka Inaba. At a house show promoted by World Woman Pro-Wrestling Diana on January 29, 2023, Nomura unsuccessfully challenged Ayako Sato for the World Woman Pro-Wrestling Diana World Championship. At ZERO1 ZERO1 Vs. Osaka-Gun, an event promoted by Pro Wrestling Zero1 on March 21, 2023, she teamed up with Jaguar Yokota to defeat Mari Manji and Hibiscus Mii.

==== Yanagase Pro Wrestling (2019–present) ====
Since 2019, Nomura started competing frequently in Yanagase Pro Wrestling, a remote promotion from Gifu. Despite wrestling over a hundred matches for the company, her most notable work orbited around Ladius Friday Night Match #45 Sae 5th Debut Anniversary, an event which was part of her fifth wrestling anniversary period which took place on October 28, 2022, where she teamed up with Mari Manji in a losing effort against The Kubota Brothers (Hide Kubota and Yasu Kubota).

== Championships and accomplishments ==
- Seadlinnng
  - Beyond the Sea Tag Team Championship (1 time) – with Arisa Nakajima
