= Riko Kaiju =

Japanese professional wrestler

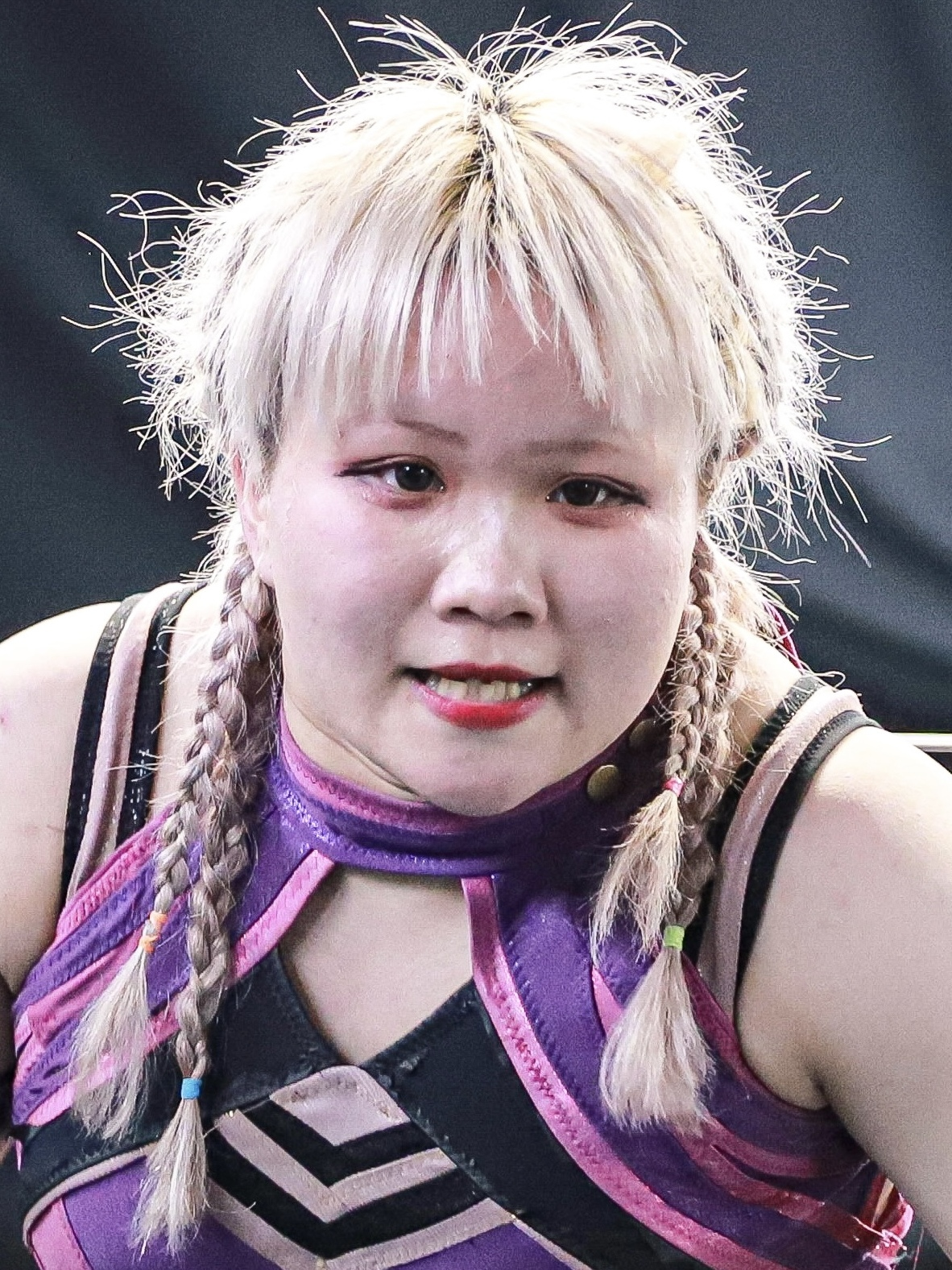
- Kaiju in May 2023

Personal information
- Born: December 17, 2001 (age 24) Shimonoseki, Japan

Professional wrestling career
- Ring name(s): Riko Blondie; Riko Kaiju; Riko Shirai
- Billed height: 154 cm (5 ft 1 in)
- Billed weight: 61 kg (134 lb)
- Trained by: Natsuki Taiyo; Nanae Takahashi
- Debut: 2020
- Retired: 2023

Riko Shirai (白井 理子, Shirai Riko) better known by her ring name Riko Kaiju is a retired Japanese professional wrestler. She is best known for performing in the Japanese promotion Pure-J where she is a former Princess of Pro-Wrestling Champion. She is also known for her time in Seadlinnng and Sukeban

== Professional wrestling career ==
=== Independent circuit (2020–2023) ===
Due to mainly working as a freelancer, Shirai is known for competing in various promotions of the Japanese independent scene. At 2AW Grand Slam In TKP Garden City Chiba, an event promoted by Active Advance Pro Wrestling on August 29, 2021, Shirai teamed up with Ayame Sasamura to defeat Madeline and Rina Shingaki. On the third night of the Sendai Girls Keep Burning 2021 from October 21, she unsuccessfully challenged Oka for the Sendai Girls Junior Championship. In Oz Academy, Shirai took part in a Contendership U-30 Tournament for the Oz Academy Openweight Championship at the beginning of 2023, as she defeated Hikari Shimizu in the first rounds, Kohaku in the semifinals, but fell short to Itsuki Aoki in the finals. She participated in Sendai Girls' Pro Wrestling 2021 edition of the Jaja Uma tournament in which she defeated Kanon in the first rounds but fell short to Yurika Oka in the semifinals.

=== Seadlinnng (2020–2023) ===
Shirai made her professional wrestling debut in Seadlinnng at SEAdLINNNG Delivered To You! on June 13, 2020, where she wrestled one of her coaches, Natsuki Taiyo into a time-limit draw. During her time in the company, she chased for various championships promoted by it. At SEAdLINNNG Shin-Kiba Night! on November 10, 2021, she teamed up with Ayame Sasamura and unsuccessfully competed against Las Fresa de Egoistas (Asuka and Makoto) in the semifinals of a number one contendership tournament for the Beyond the Sea Tag Team Championship. At a house show from May 13, 2022, Shirai unsuccessfully challenged Arisa Nakajima for the Beyond the Sea Single Championship. Shirai joined "Las Fresa de Egoistas" stable in 2020. She competed in various match gimmicks such as a captain's fall match which occurred at SEAdLINNNG Shin-Kiba NIGHT! on June 16, 2021, where she teamed up with stablemates Asuka, Ayame Sasamura and Makoto, alongside Hanako Nakamori in a losing effort against Citrus Wind (Arisa Nakajima, Honori Hana, Nanae Takahashi, Riko Kawahata and Yumiko Hotta). At SEAdLINNNG Shin-Kiba Series 2023 on January 13, Shirai competed in a battle royal won by Riko Kawahata and also involving many notable opponents, both male and female such as Amazon, Hiroyo Matsumoto, Kaho Kobayashi, Kakeru Sekiguchi, Ryo Mizunami, Kyohei Mikami and others.

=== Ice Ribbon (2020–2023) ===
Another promotion in which Shirai often competes in is Ice Ribbon. She made her first appearance at Ice Ribbon New Ice Ribbon #1057 ~ Ice Ribbon Yokohama Bunka Gymnasium FINAL on August 9, 2020, where she teamed up with Ibuki Hoshi, Maika Ozaki and Thekla to defeat Banny Oikawa, Satsuki Totoro, Yappy and Yuki Mashiro in an eight-woman elimination tag team match. At Ice Ribbon New Ice Ribbon #1187 on March 23, 2022, she unsuccessfully challenged Yuki Mashiro and Nao Ishikawa in a three-way match for the Triangle Ribbon Championship in which Mashiro defended the title.

=== Sukeban (2023) ===
Riko made her debut in Sukeban at Sukeban on September 21, 2023. On December 14, it was reported Riko would retire from in-ring competition. According to a report, her moving alumni section

=== Pure-J (2021–2023) ===
Shirai made her debut in Pure-J at PURE-J Fight Together on November 23, 2021, where she teamed up with Arisa Nakajima in a losing effort against Akari and Hanako Nakamori. She took part in the 2022 edition of the Synchronous Love Tag Team Tournament in which she teamed up with Chie Ozora and defeated Kazuki and Megumi Yabushita in the first rounds, Kaori Yoneyama and Leon in the semifinals, but fell short to Rydeen Hagane and Saki in the finals on June 26, 2022. She won her first title, the Princess of Pro-Wrestling Championship at Pure-J Climax 2022 on December 18 by defeating Crea.

=== Retirement ===
During a press conference held by Seadlinnng on December 14, 2023, it was announced that Shirai would retire from in-ring competition.

== Championships and accomplishments ==
- Pure-J
  - Princess of Pro-Wrestling Championship (1 time)
- Seadlinnng
  - Beyond the Sea Tag Team Championship (1 time) – with Ayame Sasamura
