= Ayame Sasamura =

Japanese professional wrestler

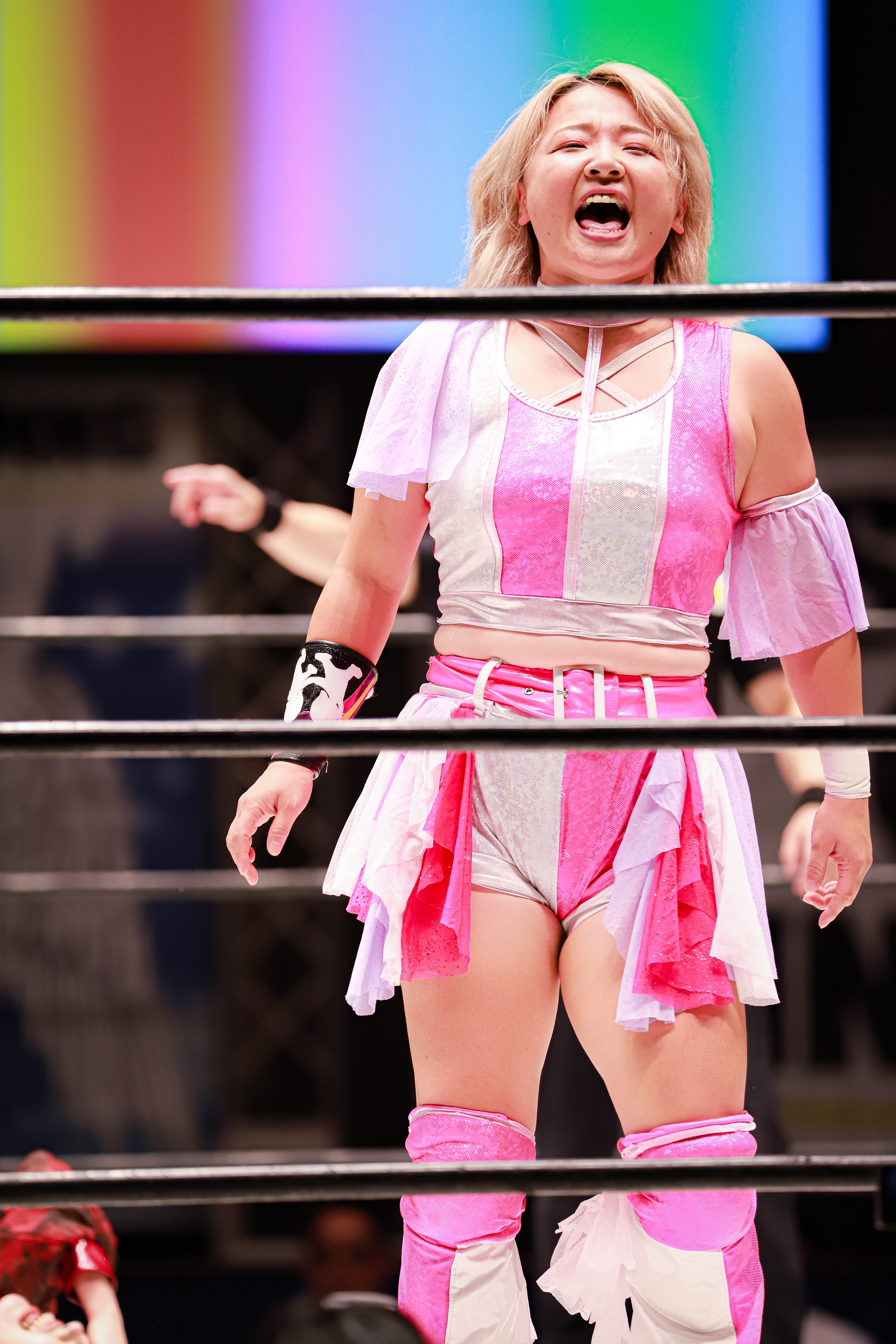
- Sasamura in August 2023

Personal information
- Born: August 14, 1995 (age 31) Saitama, Japan

Professional wrestling career
- Ring name: Ayame Sasamura
- Billed height: 154 cm (5 ft 1 in)
- Billed weight: 67 kg (148 lb)
- Trained by: Bambi
- Debut: 2017

Ayame Sasamura (笹村あやめ, Sasamura Ayame) is a Japanese professional wrestler currently working as a freelancer and is best known for her tenure with the Japanese promotions Seadlinnng and Active Advance Pro Wrestling.

== Professional wrestling career ==
=== Independent circuit (2017–present) ===
As a freelancer, Sasamura is known for competing in multiple promotions of the Japanese independent scene. At TAKA & Taichi Produce TAKATaichi House In Yokohama, and independent show produced by Taichi and Taka Michinoku on December 22, 2018, Sasamura competed in a 16-person battle royal also involving Jun Kasai, Yoshinobu Kanemaru, Natsumi Maki, Tomoaki Honma and others. At DDT Ganbare Pro Mosquito On The Tenth Floor on September 14, 2019, Sasamura teamed up with Bambi to defeat Haruka Kato and Moeka Haruhi. At Oz Academy Sparkling New Year on January 5, 2020, she teamed up with Rina Shingaki and Syuri in a losing effort against Ozaki-gun (Maya Yukihi, Mayumi Ozaki and Yumi Ohka. At BJW/ZERO1/2AW Great Clash, a cross-over event produced by Active Advance Pro Wrestling in partnership with Big Japan Pro Wrestling and Pro Wrestling Zero1 on December 24, 2021, she teamed up with Yoshikazu Yokoyama and Ryuji Ito, falling short to Chris Vice, Jaki Numazawa and Kyu Mogami.

=== Kaientai Dojo/Active Advance Pro Wrestling (2017–present) ===
Sasamura made her professional wrestling debut at K-DOJO Tokyo Super Big Show, an event promoted by Kaientai Dojo on October 15, 2017 where she fell short to her own trainer Bambi. At 2AW GRAND SLAM In Shinkiba on August 3, 2019, Sasamura teamed up with Ayato Yoshida and Chibayan to unsuccessfully challenge Rasse, Yapper Man #1 and Yapper Man #2 for the Chiba Six Man Tag Team Championship.

=== Pro Wrestling Wave (2018–present) ===
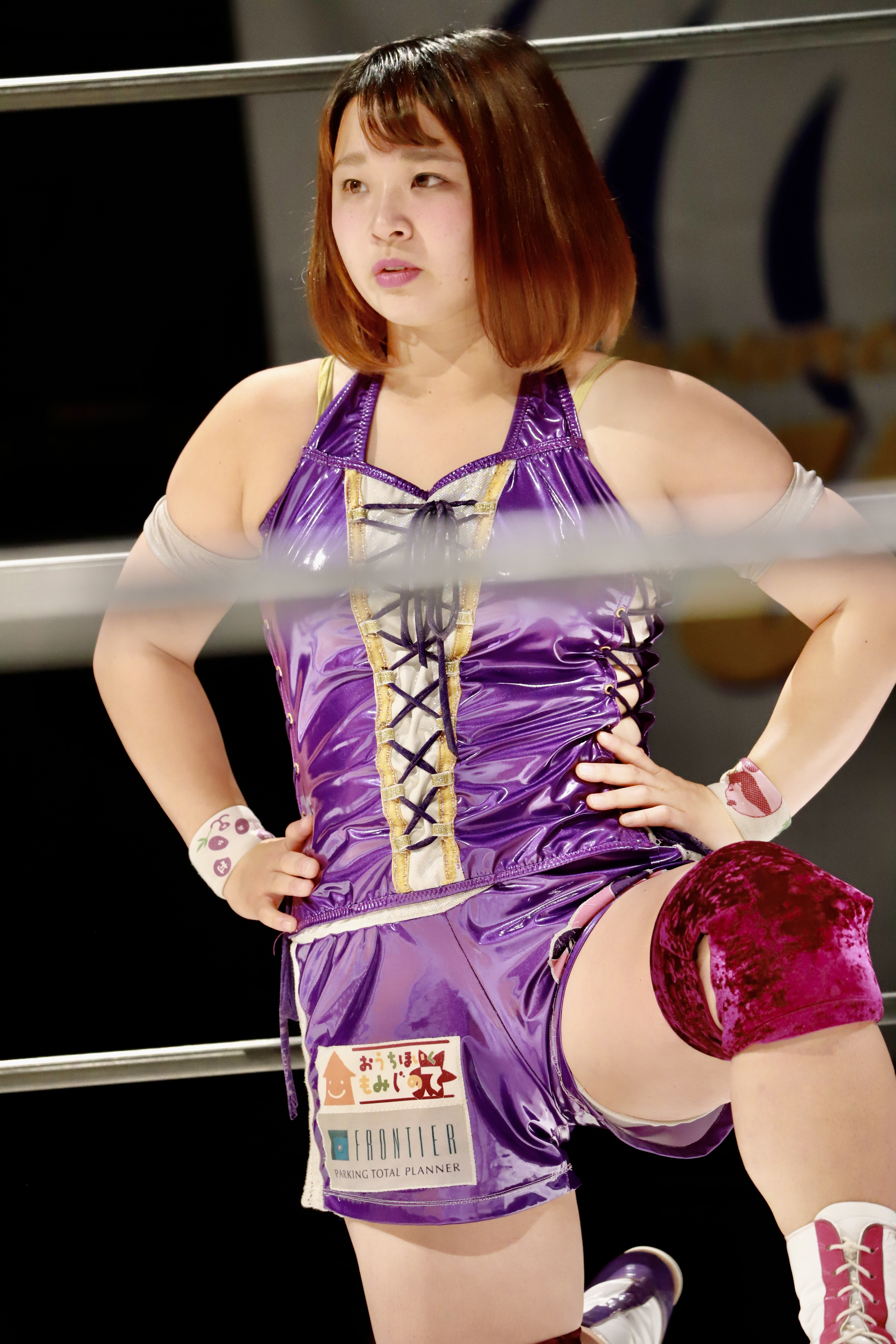
Sasamura in November 2020

Sasamura is known for competing in the promotion's signature events such as the Dual Shock Wave, making her first appearance in the 2020 edition of the tournament where she teamed up with her "3A" tag team mate Rina Shingaki to defeat the teams of Nagisa Nozaki and Saki, and Boss To Mammy (Yumi Ohka and Mio Momono) in a three-way match in the first round, and then falling short to the teams of Luminous (Haruka Umesaki and Miyuki Takase) and Itsuki Aoki and Rin Kadokura in the second round. On December 18, 2020, Sasamura participated in a one-day tournament to determine the #1 contender for the Wave Singles Championship in which she defeated Saki in the first-round match but fell short to Sakura Hirota in the second round.

=== Seadlinnng (2018–present) ===
One of the promotions for which she is known to have worked for is Seadlinnng. She made her first appearance at SEAdLINNNG Shin-Kiba 4th NIGHT on June 8, 2018, where she teamed up with Asuka in a losing effort against Arisa Nakajima and Misaki Ohata. At SEAdLINNNG Sparkling-d! 2018 on December 13, Sasamura teamed up with Arisa Nakajima to defeat Borderless (Rina Yamashita and Yoshiko) for the Beyond the Sea Tag Team Championship.

=== Sendai Girls' Pro Wrestling (2018–present) ===
Another promotion in which Sasamura is known for competing is Sendai Girls' Pro Wrestling. She became the inaugural Sendai Girls Junior Champion after defeating Manami in the finals of a tournament which took place on October 14, 2018. After she dropped the title to Millie McKenzie, Sasamura continued to make sporadic appearances in the promotion, competing in battle royals such as the one from a house show promoted on January 12, 2020, match won by Dash Chisako and also involving Chihiro Hashimoto, Dalys la Caribeña, Kaoru, Sakura Hirota, Sareee and others. She also competed in signature events of the promotion like the Royal Tag Tournament 2019 where she teamed up with Yoshiko in the first-rounds from November 12 where they fell short to Meiko Satomura and Syuri.

== Championships and accomplishments ==
- Active Advance Pro Wrestling
  - 2AW Tag Team Championship (1 time) – with Kotaro Yoshino
- Pro Wrestling Wave
  - Catch the Wave Award (1 time)
    - Best Bout Award (2023) vs. Itsuki Aoki on June 1
- Seadlinnng
  - Beyond the Sea Single Championship (1 time, current)
  - Beyond the Sea Tag Team Championship (3 times) – with Arisa Nakajima (1), Riko Kaiju (1) and Itsuki Aoki (1)
  - Saikyo Tournament (2026)
- Sendai Girls' Pro Wrestling
  - Sendai Girls Junior Championship (1 time, inaugural)
- World Woman Pro-Wrestling Diana
  - World Woman Pro-Wrestling Diana World Championship (1 time)
  - World Woman Pro-Wrestling Diana Tag Team Championship (1 time) – with Rina Shingaki
