= Beyond the Sea Tag Team Championship =

Professional wrestling women's tag team championship

Details
- Promotion: Seadlinnng
- Date established: July 25, 2018
- Current champions: Colorful Bouquet Toss (Unagi Sayaka and Honori Hana)
- Date won: December 26, 2025
Statistics
- First champions: Borderless (Rina Yamashita and Yoshiko)
- Most reigns: As a team (2 reigns): Las Fresa de Egoistas (Asuka and Makoto); As individual (4 reigns): Arisa Nakajima
- Longest reign: Asuka and Makoto (546 days)
- Shortest reign: Arisa Nakajima and Sae (39 days)
- Oldest champion: Nanae Takahashi (42 years, 30 days)
- Youngest champion: Riko Kaiju (21 years, 193 days)
- Heaviest champion: Borderless (Rina Yamashita and Yoshiko) (334 lbs combined)
- Lightest champion: Arisa Nakajima and Sae (321 lbs combined)

The Beyond the Sea Tag Team Championship is a professional wrestling tag team championship created and promoted by the Seadlinnng promotion. The inaugural champions were crowned on July 25, 2018, when Borderless (Rina Yamashita and Yoshiko) defeated Nanae Takahashi and Tsukasa Fujimoto.

Like most professional wrestling championships, the title is won as a result of a scripted match. There have been a total of 16 reigns and two vacancies shared among 15 teams and 20 wrestlers. The titles are currently held by Colorful Bouquet Toss (Unagi Sayaka and Honori Hana) who are in their first reign as a team and individually.

== Title history ==
On July 25, 2018, Borderless (Rina Yamashita and Yoshiko) defeated Nanae Takahashi and Tsukasa Fujimoto to become the inaugural champions. On February 28, 2019, the current champions Arisa Nakajima and Ayame Sasamura vacated the title after Sasamura suffered a leg injury. On March 20, Nakajima alongside Sae defeated Himeka Arita and Miyuki Takase to win the vacant championship.

== Reigns ==
As of October 17, 2026, there have been a total of 16 reigns shared between 15 teams composed of 17 individual champions and two vacancies. The inaugural championship team was Borderless (Rina Yamashita and Yoshiko). The team Las Fresa de Egoistas (Asuka and Makoto) has the most reigns at two times, while individually, Arisa Nakajima has the most reigns at four times. As a team, Asuka and Makoto has the longest reign at 546 days in their second reign as a team, while Nakajima and Sae has the shortest at 39 days. Nanae Takahashi is the oldest champion at 42 years old, while Asuka is the youngest at 22 years old.

Unagi Sayaka and Honori Hana are the current champions in their first reign as a team, as well as individually. They defeated Mio Shirai and Sumire Natsu on December 26, 2025, at SEAdLINNNG 2025 Final Battle!.

Key
No.	Overall reign number
Reign	Reign number for the specific team—reign numbers for the individuals are in parentheses, if different
Days	Number of days held
Defenses	Number of successful defenses
+	Current reign is changing daily

No.	Champion	Championship change			Reign statistics			Notes	Ref.
No.	Champion	Date	Event	Location	Reign	Days	Defenses	Notes	Ref.
1	Borderless (Rina Yamashita and Yoshiko)	July 25, 2018	Summer Blast	Tokyo, Japan	1	141	4	Defeated Nanae Takahashi and Tsukasa Fujimoto to become the inaugural champions.	
2	∀∀ Impact (Arisa Nakajima and Ayame Sasamura)	December 13, 2018	Sparkling-d!	Tokyo, Japan	1	77	1		
—	Vacated	February 28, 2019	Shin-Kiba 10th Night	Tokyo, Japan	—	—	—	The championship was vacated after Ayame Sasamura had been sidelined with a leg injury.	
3	Arisa Nakajima and Sae	March 20, 2019	Luckiest	Tokyo, Japan	1 (2, 1)	39	0	Defeated Himeka Arita and Miyuki Takase to win the vacant championship.	
4	The Beginning (Himeka Arita and Miyuki Takase)	April 28, 2019	The Last Arisa Nakajima Produce of Heisei Era	Tokyo, Japan	1	61	1		
5	Hiroyo Matsumoto and Yoshiko	June 28, 2019	Shin-Kiba 14th Night	Tokyo, Japan	1 (1, 2)	463	5		
6	Best Friends (Arisa Nakajima and Tsukasa Fujimoto)	October 3, 2020	Yokohama Flash 2020!	Yokohama, Japan	1 (3, 1)	55	1		
7	Oninikanabō (Sareee and Yoshiko)	November 27, 2020	Shin-Kiba Night	Tokyo, Japan	1 (1, 3)	56	1		
8	Arisa Nakajima and Nanae Takahashi	January 22, 2021	Shin-Kiba Night	Tokyo, Japan	1 (4, 1)	124	1		
9	Las Fresa de Egoistas (Asuka and Makoto)	May 26, 2021	Shin-Kiba Night	Tokyo, Japan	1	119	1		
10	Hiroyo Matsumoto and Nanae Takahashi	September 22, 2021	Seadlinnng	Tokyo, Japan	1 (2, 2)	98	0		
11	Las Fresa de Egoistas (Asuka and Makoto)	December 29, 2021	Seadlinnng 2021 Final Battle	Tokyo, Japan	2	546	4		
12	Little Twin Berries (Ayame Sasamura and Riko Kaiju)	June 28, 2023	Seadlinnng Shinjuku Pumping!	Tokyo, Japan	1 (2, 1)	169	2		
—	Vacated	December 14, 2023	—	—	—	—	—	Riko Kaiju relinquished her half of the titles upon her retirement from professional wrestling.	
13	Las Fresa de Egoistas (Makoto and Nagisa Nozaki)	March 15, 2024	Shin-Kiba Series 2024 Vol. 2	Tokyo, Japan	1 (3, 1)	161	1	Defeated Veny and Maya Yukihi to win the vacant titles.	
14	Ayame Sasamura and Itsuki Aoki	August 23, 2024	Seadlinnng 9th Anniversary: Arisa Nakajima Retirement	Tokyo, Japan	1 (3, 1)	364	3		
15	Mio Shirai and Sumire Natsu	August 22, 2025	Seadlinnng 10th Anniversary	Tokyo, Japan	1 (1, 1)	126	3		
16	Colorful Bouquet Toss (Unagi Sayaka and Honori Hana)	December 26, 2025	Seadlinnng 2025 Final Battle!	Tokyo, Japan	1 (1, 1)	295+	1		

== Combined reigns ==
=== By team ===
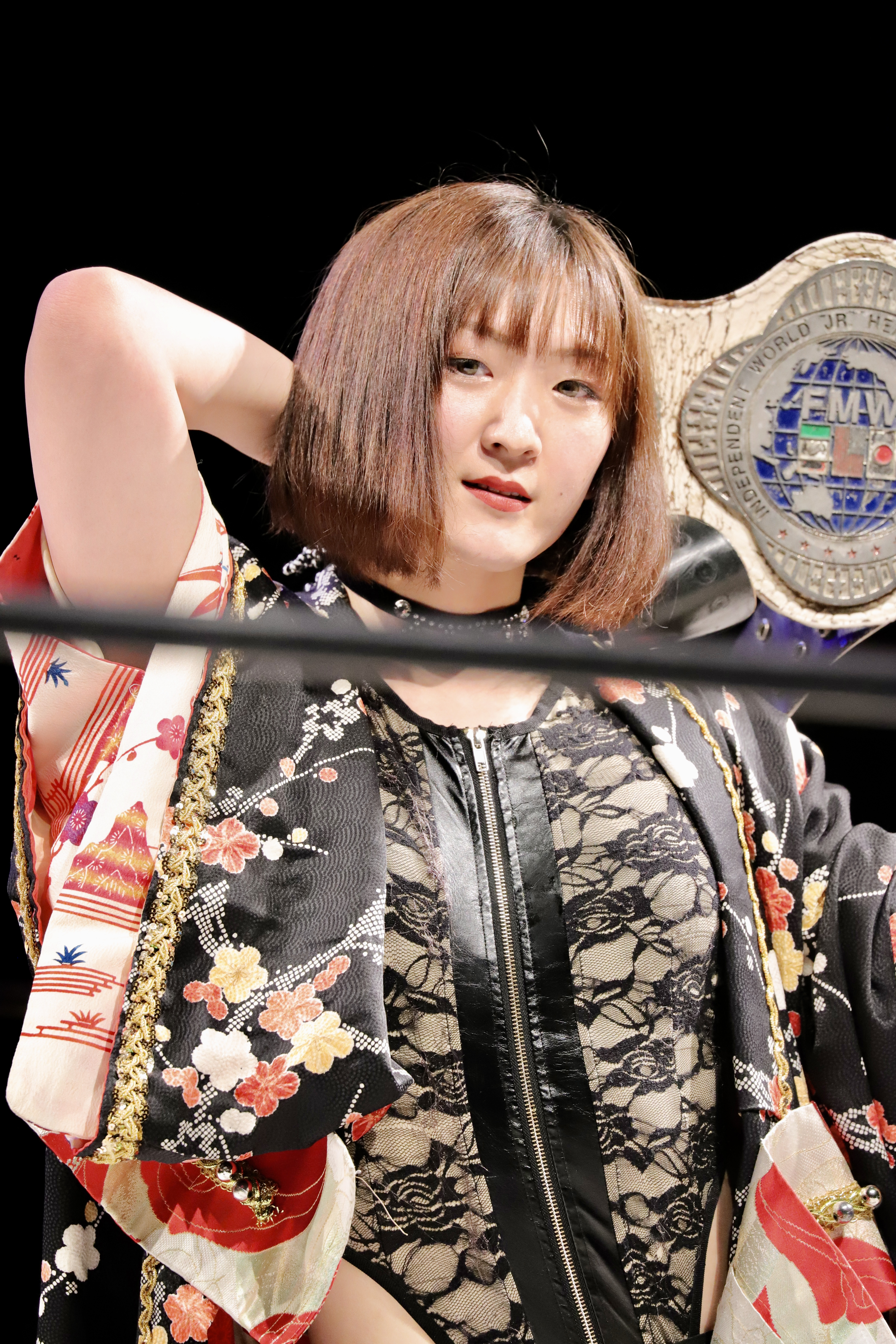
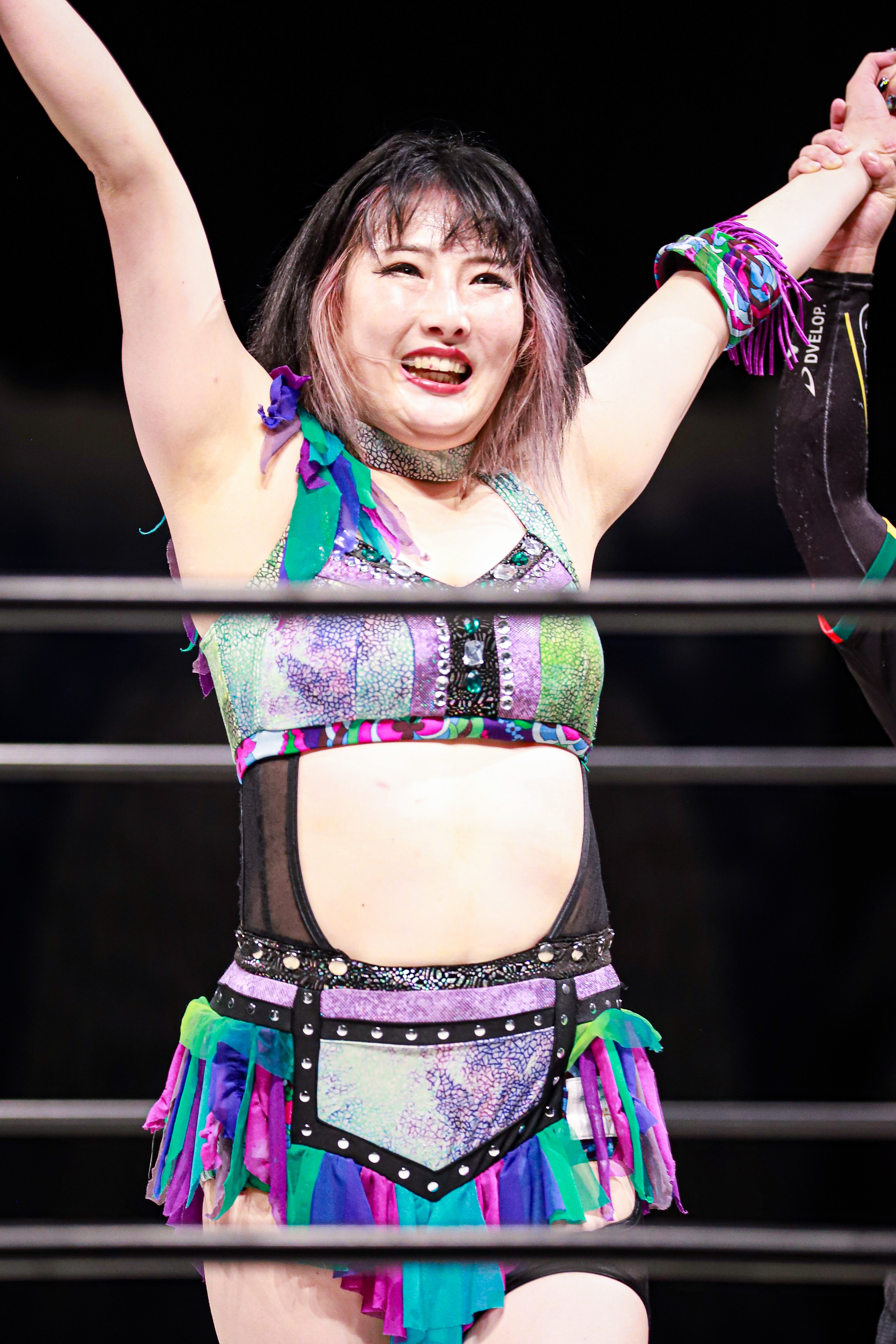
Longest and record-tying two-time champions, as a team, Las Fresa de Egoistas (Asuka and Makoto)

As of October 17, 2026.

†	Indicates the current champion

Rank	Team	No. of reigns	Combined defenses	Combined days
1	Las Fresa de Egoistas (Asuka and Makoto)	2	5	665
2	Hiroyo Matsumoto and Yoshiko	1	5	463
3	Ayame Sasamura and Itsuki Aoki	1	3	364
4	Colorful Bouquet Toss † (Unagi Sayaka and Honori Hana)	1	1	295+
5	Little Twin Berries (Ayame Sasamura and Riko Kaiju)	1	2	169
6	Las Fresa de Egoistas (Makoto and Nagisa Nozaki)	1	1	161
7	Borderless (Rina Yamashita and Yoshiko)	1	4	141
8	Mio Shirai and Sumire Natsu	1	3	126
9	Arisa Nakajima and Nanae Takahashi	1	1	124
10	Hiroyo Matsumoto and Nanae Takahashi	1	0	98
11	∀∀ Impact (Arisa Nakajima and Ayame Sasamura)	1	1	77
12	The Beginning (Himeka Arita and Miyuki Takase)	1	1	61
13	Oninikanabō (Sareee and Yoshiko)	1	1	56
14	Best Friends (Arisa Nakajima and Tsukasa Fujimoto)	1	1	55
15	Arisa Nakajima and Sae	1	0	39

=== By wrestler ===
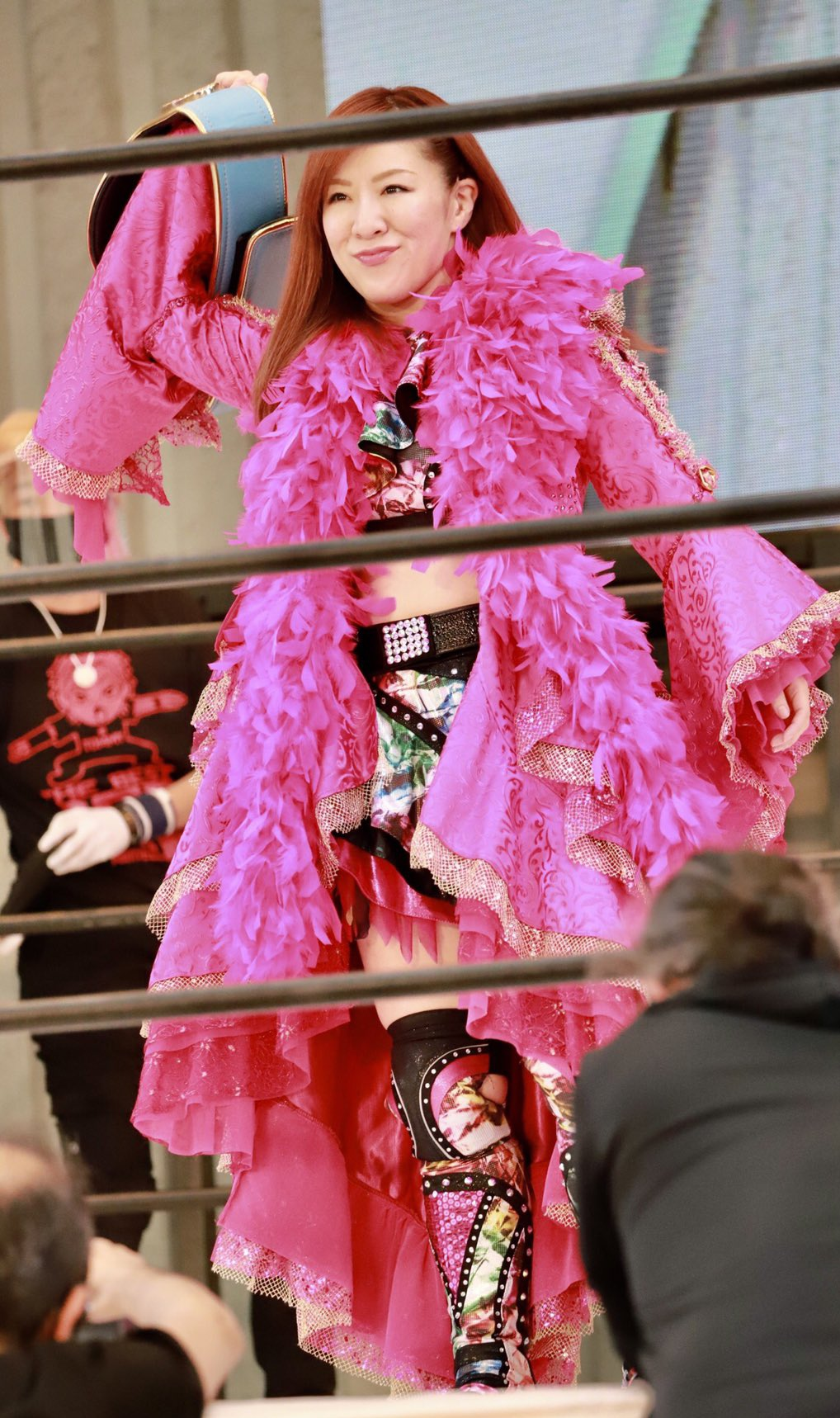
Individually, record four-time champion Arisa Nakajima

†	Indicates the current champion

Rank	Wrestler	No. of reigns	Combined defenses	Combined days
1	Makoto	3	6	826
2	Hiroyo Matsumoto	2	5	743
3	Asuka	2	5	665
4	Yoshiko	3	10	660
5	Ayame Sasamura	3	6	610
6	Itsuki Aoki	1	3	364
7	Unagi Sayaka †	1	1	295+
7	Honori Hana †	1	1	295+
9	Arisa Nakajima	4	3	295
10	Nanae Takahashi	2	1	220
11	Riko Kaiju	1	2	169
12	Nagisa Nozaki	1	1	161
13	Rina Yamashita	1	4	141
14	Mio Shirai	1	3	126
14	Sumire Natsu	1	3	126
16	Himeka Arita	1	1	61
16	Miyuki Takase	1	1	61
18	Sareee	1	1	56
19	Tsukasa Fujimoto	1	1	55
20	Sae	1	0	39
