= Seadlinnng =

Japanese women's professional wrestling promotion

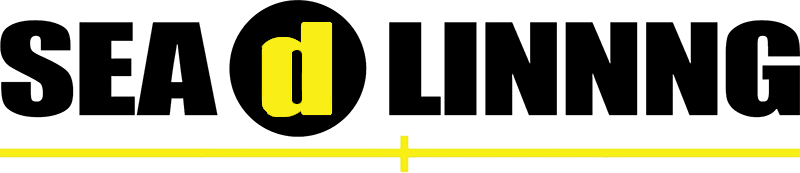
- Acronym: Sead
- Founded: June 12, 2015
- Style: Joshi puroresu
- Headquarters: Kawasaki, Kanagawa, Japan
- Founder: Nanae Takahashi
- Split from: World Wonder Ring Stardom
- Website: seadlinnng.com

Seadlinnng (stylised as SEAdLINNNG) is a Japanese women's professional wrestling promotion founded in 2015 by former Stardom wrestler and founder Nanae Takahashi. Their roster is predominantly made up of outside talent from other promotions such as Ice Ribbon, Gatoh Move Pro Wrestling and World Woman Pro-Wrestling Diana, as well as veterans and freelancers.

== History ==
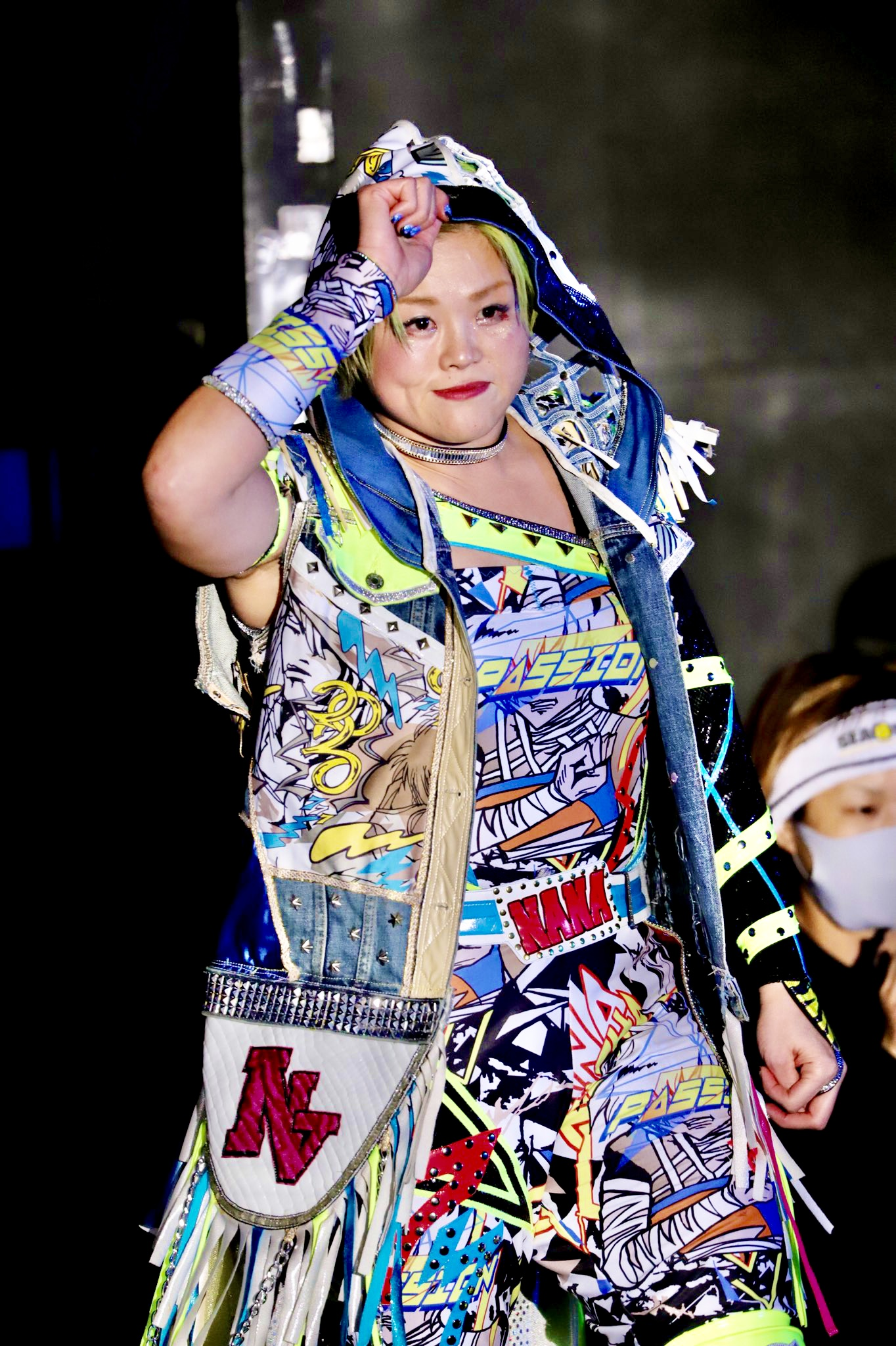
Seadlinnng founder Nanae Takahashi (seen here in 2020)

After 5 years with World Wonder Ring Stardom, founder Nanae Takahashi left the promotion in the wake of the in-ring incident between Yoshiko and Act Yasukawa. A few months after leaving, Takahashi, along with retired wrestler Natsuki☆Taiyo, announced the formation of her own promotion, to be known as Seadlinnng (stylised as SEAdLINNNG) on June 12, 2015. The reasoning for the name was a combination between seedling, symbolising the new promotion, and "to cross the sea". The promotion's debut show, Let's Get Started, took place on August 26, 2015, in Korakuen Hall. In February 2016, Yoshiko Hirano, a trainee of both Takahashi and Taiyo who retired from pro wrestling in 2015 following a legitimate in-ring incident with fellow wrestler Act Yasukawa, announced she would be coming out of retirement to compete for Seadlinnng. In September of the same year, Seadlinnng announced a partnership with American promotion Ring Of Honor's women's division, Women of Honor. This partnership lead to American wrestlers such as ODB and Veda Scott competing in Sead. In January 2017, the promotion gained another signed wrestler in Arisa Nakajima, who had resigned from JWP the previous month. One month later, World Woman Pro-Wrestling Diana mainstay Sareee announced she too would sign with the promotion, however, she left and returned to Diana in September of the same year.

On December 14, 2021, it was revealed that Takahashi would leave the promotion as a wrestler and as the president of the company after the Korakuen Hall show on December 29.

== Roster ==
=== Wrestlers ===
Ring name	Real name	Notes
Ayame Sasamura	Ayame Sasamura	Beyond the Sea Champion
Hiroyo Matsumoto	Hiroyo Matsumoto	
Itsuki Aoki	Aika Aoki	Freelancer
Asuka	Unknown	
Amazon	Ayesha Raymond	
Makoto	Unknown	Freelancer
Misa Kagura	Unknown	Freelancer
Nagisa Nozaki	Nagisa Nozaki	Freelancer
Yoshiko	Yoshiko Hirano	

=== Staff ===
Ring name	Real name	Notes
Natsuki☆Taiyo	Natsumi Mizushima	President; Referee; Managing Director

=== Alumni ===
Ring name	Real name	Notes
Arisa Nakajima	Unknown	Retired on August 23, 2024.
Himeka Arita	Himeka Arita	Retired in 2023.
Honori Hana	Honori Hana	
Nanae Takahashi	Nanae Takahashi	Founder; Former president Left on December 29, 2021
ODB	Jessica Nora Kresa	
Rin Kadokura	Kazumi Sugiura	
Sae	Sae Nomura	
Sakura Hirota	Sakura Hirota	
Sareee	Sari Fujimura	Left Seadlinnng in September 2017. Returned in 2020 and left in 2021 to work for WWE. Returned in 2023 and left in 2025
Veda Scott	Veda Scott	
Riko Kaiju	Riko Shirai	Retired in 2023.

=== Notable alumni/guests ===
- Akane Fujita
- Akari
- Aoi Kizuki
- Chie Ozora
- Crea
- Hanako Nakamori
- Hikari Shimizu
- Hiroyo Matsumoto
- Hiroe Nagahama
- Kaoru Ito
- Kyuri
- Manami
- Mika Iida
- Mika Iwata
- Misa Matsui
- Miyuki Takase
- Mochi Miyagi
- Riko Kawahata
- Rydeen Hagane
- Ryo Mizunami
- Suzu Suzuki
- Thekla
- Totoro Satsuki
- Yuki Mashiro
- Yurika Oka
- Yuu Yamagata

== Championships ==
As of April 18, 2026

Championship	Current champion(s)	Reign	Date won	Days held	Location	Notes
Beyond the Sea Single Championship	Ayame Sasamura	1	April 17, 2026	1+	Tokyo, Japan	Defeated Hiroyo Matsumoto at Jump Up! 2026.
Beyond the Sea Tag Team Championship	Colorful Bouquet Toss (Unagi Sayaka and Honori Hana)	1 (1, 1)	December 26, 2025	113+	Tokyo, Japan	Defeated Mio Shirai and Sumire Natsu at SEAdLINNNG 2025 Final Battle!.

== See also ==
- Professional wrestling in Japan
- List of professional wrestling promotions in Japan
