= Piledriver =

Piledriver or pile driver may refer to:

- Pile driver, a machine that uses a hammer to drive piles used as a foundation into the ground
- Piledriver (professional wrestling), a move used in professional wrestling

== Entertainment ==
- Piledriver (album), a 1972 album by Status Quo
- Piledriver: The Wrestling Album II, a 1987 album produced by the World Wrestling Federation
- Piledriver (band), a Canadian thrash/heavy metal band
- Piledriver (character), a Marvel Comics villain
- "Piledriver" (Space Ghost Coast to Coast), a television episode
- The Piledriver, a drop tower ride at WWE Niagara Falls

== Other uses ==
- Pile Driver, a U.S. nuclear test
- Piledriver (microarchitecture), a CPU microarchitecture by AMD
- Piledriver (sex position), a sexual position
