= Arisa Nakajima =

Japanese professional wrestler (born 1989)

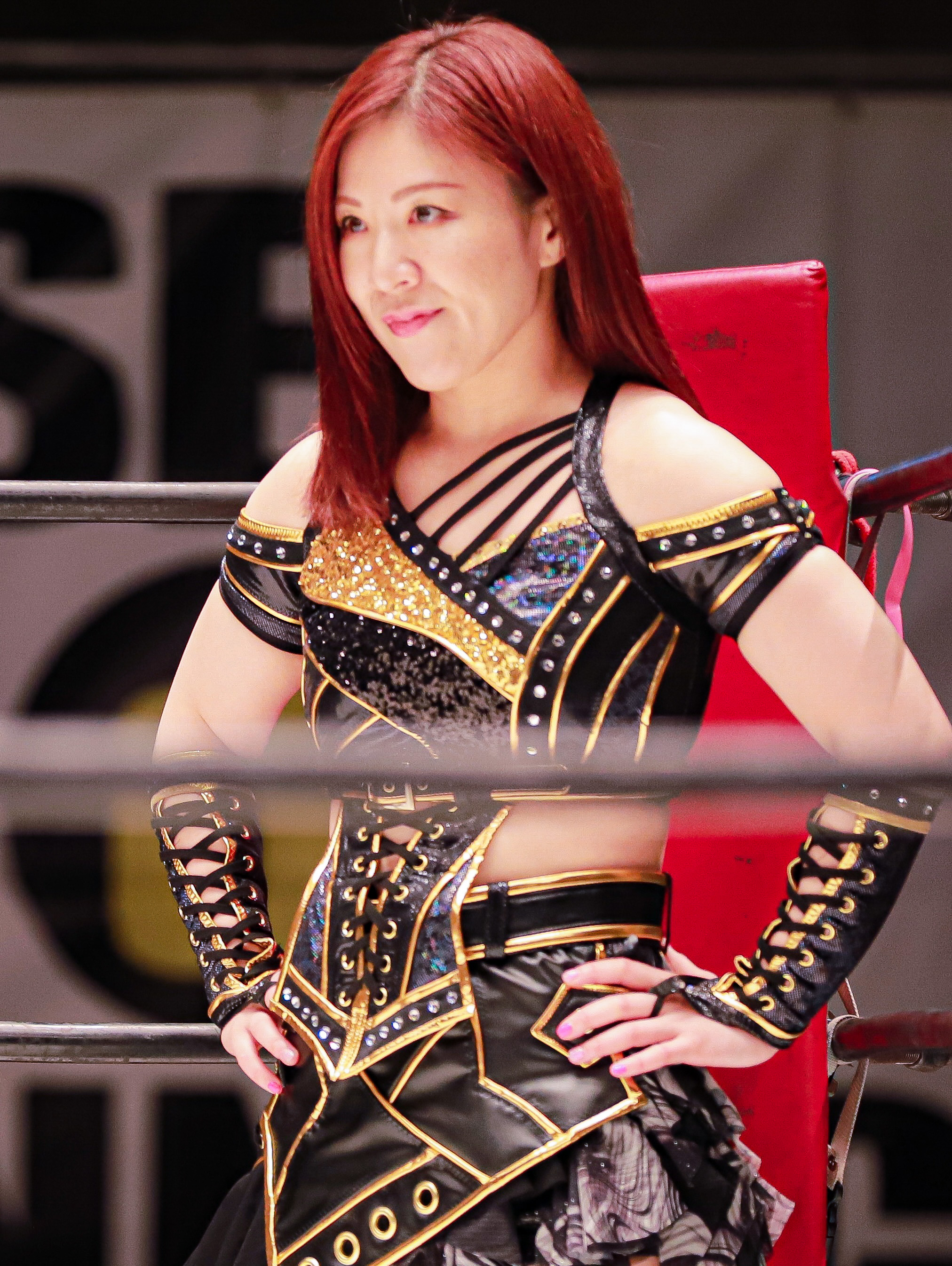
- Nakajima in August 2023

Personal information
- Born: Arisa Nakajima; April 6, 1989 (age 37) Chichibu, Saitama

Professional wrestling career
- Ring name(s): Arisa Haruyama; Arisa Nakajima; Arisanta; Commander Nakajima; Nakajima Santa
- Billed height: 1.60 m (5 ft 3 in)
- Billed weight: 60 kg (132 lb)
- Debut: January 3, 2006
- Retired: August 23, 2024

Arisa Nakajima (中島 安里紗, Nakajima Arisa; born April 6, 1989) is a Japanese retired professional wrestler. Trained by the Major Girl's Fighting AtoZ promotion, Nakajima made her debut in January 2006, but when the promotion folded the following May, she transferred over to JWP Joshi Puroresu, where she became a two-time JWP Junior and Princess of Pro-Wrestling Champion. Nakajima retired from professional wrestling in June 2009, but made her return to JWP in April 2012. The following December, Nakajima won JWP's top title, the JWP Openweight Championship, for the first time. She eventually went on to become a record four-time JWP Openweight Champion, while also winning the JWP Tag Team and Daily Sports Women's Tag Team Championships twice, before quitting JWP in December 2016. The following month, Nakajima joined the Seadlinnng promotion.

== Professional wrestling career ==
=== Major Girl's Fighting AtoZ (2006) ===
Nakajima began training professional wrestling with the Major Girl's Fighting AtoZ promotion at the age of 16 in 2005 and made her debut on January 3, 2006, facing fellow rookie Mika Mizunuma in Korakuen Hall. During her first months in the business, Nakajima wrestled several other matches against Mizunuma, including a "Best of Three" match series in February and a singles rematch on March 18 in Korakuen Hall, which Nakajima went on to win. Nakajima and Mizunuma also wrestled against each other at a Wrestling Marvelous of the Future (WMF) event on March 27, with Nakajima picking up the win. However, Nakajima's run with AtoZ ended abruptly, when the promotion folded following a May 3 event in Korakuen Hall.

=== JWP Joshi Puroresu (2006–2016) ===
While still affiliated with AtoZ, Nakajima made her debut for JWP Joshi Puroresu on April 30, 2006, when she faced Kaori Yoneyama in a losing effort. Following the folding of AtoZ, Nakajima began working regularly for JWP, starting on May 21. However, she was still officially without a home promotion, working freelancer for various promotions, often teaming with fellow AtoZ alum Sachie Abe as the tag team "Hysteric Babe". In JWP, Hysteric Babe teamed only once, on July 16, when they were defeated by Ran Yu-Yu and Toshie Uematsu in a match to determine the number one contenders to the JWP Tag Team Championship. In August, Nakajima made several appearances for the new Ice Ribbon promotion. During a JWP event on August 6, both Nakajima and Abe announced that they had signed with the promotion, becoming full-fledged members of its roster, with Nakajima becoming the first JWP wrestler born in the Heisei period. Afterwards, Abe left Nakajima to reform her old JDStar tag team "The☆Wanted!?" with Kazuki. After a series of losses, Nakajima finally picked up her first JWP win on September 3, when she defeated Yuri Urai. On November 26, Nakajima entered a tournament for the vacant JWP Junior Championship, defeating Hanako Kobayashi in her first round match. The tournament continued on December 12, when Nakajima defeated Hiroyo Matsumoto in her semifinal match. Finally, on Christmas Eve, Nakajima defeated Ice Ribbon representative Aoi Kizuki in the finals to become the new JWP Junior Champion. JWP's year ended with the promotion naming Nakajima the 2006 Newcomer of the Year. Before the end of the year, Nakajima made her first successful defense of her newly won title, when she defeated Mai Ichii at a NEO Japan Ladies Pro Wrestling event on December 31.

On April 8, 2007, Nakajima entered the Discover New Heroine Tag Tournament, teaming with JWP Openweight Champion Azumi Hyuga. In their first round match, Nakajima and Hyuga defeated the NEO Japan Ladies Pro Wrestling duo of Nagisa Nozaki and Yuki Miyazaki. On April 15, Nakajima and Hyuga first defeated Ayumi Kurihara and Yoshiko Tamura, also representing NEO, in their second round match and then the Passion Red team of Nanae Takahashi and Natsuki☆Taiyo in the semifinals. Later that same event, Nakajima and Hyuga were defeated in the finals of the tournament by the team of Aya Yuki and Misae Genki. The loss led to a match on April 29 in Aya Yuki's home promotion, NEO Japan Ladies Pro Wrestling, where Nakajima successfully defended the JWP Junior Championship against her. During the summer of 2007, Nakajima also took part in JDStar's League Princess tournament. The tournament concluded on June 17, when Nakajima defeated Hiroyo Matsumoto and Yuri Urai in a three-way Dogfight final to not only win the tournament, but to also become the new Princess of Pro-Wrestling (POP) Champion. As this was one of JDStar's final ever events, the POP Championship was effectively unified with the JWP Junior Championship and the two titles were defended together for the next ten years. On August 5, Nakajima made her third successful defense of the JWP Junior Championship and her first successful defense of the POP Championship by defeating Aoi Kizuki. Nakajima followed that up by also successfully defending the titles against Misaki Ohata on October 21. During the second half of 2007, Nakajima started an interpromotional storyline rivalry with Sendai Girls' Pro Wrestling's Tyrannosaurus Okuda. One early notable match in the rivalry saw Nakajima and Okuda team up with their respective mentors, Azumi Hyuga and Meiko Satomura, in a tag team match at a Sendai Girls' event on October 5, which was won by the JWP duo. On November 18, Nakajima lost the JWP Junior and POP Championship to Okuda in the main event of a Sendai Girls' event. The year ended with JWP's fifth Junior All Star event, during which Nakajima teamed with Hanako Kobayashi and Hiroyo Matsumoto to defeat Okuda, Aoi Kizuki and Aya Yuki in a main event "Best of Juniors" match. The year ended with Nakajima being named the MVP of JWP's Junior division, while also being given the Fighting Spirit award.

On February 11, 2008, Nakajima entered a tournament to determine the number one contender to the JWP Openweight Championship. After winning only one of her four round-robin stage matches, Nakajima failed to advance to the finals of the tournament. On June 8, Nakajima defeated Tyrannosaurus Okuda at a JWP event to regain the JWP Junior and Princess of Pro-Wrestling Championships. Nakajima made her first title defense on October 12, defeating Sendai Girls' Pro Wrestling representative Ryo Mizunami. After a 196-day reign, she lost the titles to Hiroyo Matsumoto on December 21 at an event held by the Ibuki promotion. On February 21, 2009, Nakajima, teaming with Toujyuki Leon, received her first shot at the JWP Tag Team and Daily Sports Women's Tag Team Championships, but the two were defeated by the defending champions, Keito and Yumiko Hotta. On April 19, Nakajima was defeated by Saki Maemura in a singles match. Following the match, JWP sidelined Nakajima from in-ring action due to "poor health". On May 31, Nakajima officially quit JWP and three days later announced her retirement from professional wrestling, however, keeping the door open for a possible return down the road.

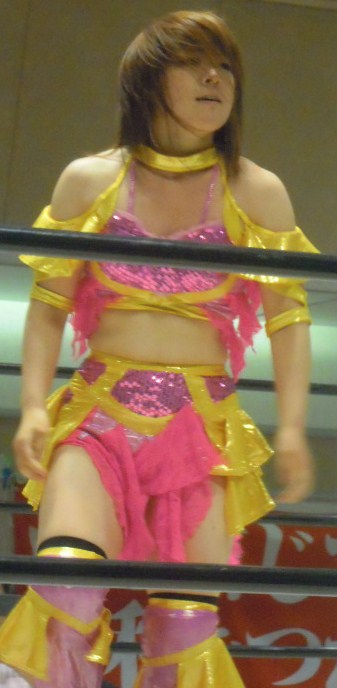
Nakajima in July 2012

After remaining inactive for two and a half years, Nakajima made a surprise return to JWP on December 23, 2011, announcing that she would be making her return the following year. Nakajima wrestled her return match on April 22, 2012, at JWP's 20th anniversary event, where she teamed with her former Hysteric Babe partner Sachie Abe in a losing effort against the team of Hanako Nakamori and Misaki Ohata. Nakajima then formed a tag team with Manami Katsu and picked up her first win since her return on May 20, when the two defeated Leon and Rabbit Miu in a tag team match. On June 17, Nakajima and Katsu received a shot at the JWP Tag Team and Daily Sports Women's Tag Team Championships, but were unable to dethrone the defending champions, Emi Sakura and Kaori Yoneyama. On June 24, Nakajima and Katsu made their debuts for the Reina X World promotion, losing to La Malcriada and Zeuxis in the main event of the evening. Nakajima and Katsu picked up their first Reina X World win at the following event on July 7, when they defeated Micro and Puchi Tomato. Through JWP's working relationship with Ice Ribbon, Nakajima returned to the promotion on July 11, wrestling the promotion's top champion, ICE×60 Champion Hikaru Shida, to a ten-minute time limit draw. Afterwards, the two agreed to team up in the upcoming JRibbon Natsu Onna Kettei Tournament, a JWP staple, which was this time co-produced by JWP and Ice Ribbon. The tournament took place over two "JRibbon" events on July 28; an afternoon Ice Ribbon event and an evening JWP event. During the Ice Ribbon event, Nakajima and Shida defeated Hamuko Hoshi and Kayoko Haruyama to advance to the JWP event, where they defeated Command Bolshoi and Hikari Minami in their semifinal match, which went to an overtime after an original fifteen-minute time limit draw. However, in the finals of the tournament later that same event, Nakajima and Shida were defeated by the team of Hanako Nakamori and Maki Narumiya.

In August, Nakajima became one of the key members of the JWP Seikigun ("regular army"), during the promotion's storyline rivalry with Emi Sakura and Kaori Yoneyama, representing the Gatoh Move Pro Wrestling promotion. After being defeated by Sakura in a singles match August 12, Nakajima and fellow Seikigun member Command Bolshoi defeated Sakura and Yoneyama on August 19 to win the JWP Tag Team and Daily Sports Women's Tag Team Championships. Nakajima and Bolshoi made their first successful title defense on September 9, defeating Leon and Ray. On October 7, the JWP Seikigun, represented by Nakajima, Bolshoi, Kayoko Haruyama and Manami Katsu, were defeated in an eight-woman captain's fall elimination tag team main event by Emi Sakura's and Kaori Yoneyama's new Heart Move Kei Reform (HMK) stable, which in addition to the two also included Hanako Nakamori and Morii. Nakajima was the only JWP representative not eliminated from the match. On October 28, Nakajima and Bolshoi successfully defended their titles against Nakamori and Morii. Following the main event, where HMK member Emi Sakura captured the JWP Openweight Championship from Kayoko Haruyama, Nakajima entered the ring and made a challenge for the title. On November 11, Nakajima defeated Morii and Nakamori in a four-woman tournament to become the number one contender to the JWP Openweight Championship. En route to the title match, Nakajima was pinned for the win by Kaori Yoneyama in an eight-woman captain's fall elimination tag team main event between JWP and HMK on December 2. On December 24, Nakajima capped off her return year by defeating Emi Sakura to win the JWP Openweight Championship for the first time. Afterwards, the bloody champion, thirteen years younger than her opponent and the second youngest JWP Openweight Champion in history, announced that she wanted to defend the title against wrestlers from her own generation. Three days later, Nakajima was named JWP's MVP of 2012, while her and Bolshoi's tag team title match with Sakura and Yoneyama from August 19 was named the Match of the Year.

On January 6 at JWP's first event of 2013, Nakajima and Bolshoi lost the JWP Tag Team and Daily Sports Women's Tag Team Championships to Kayoko Haruyama and Tsubasa Kuragaki, with Haruyama pinning Nakajima for the win. On January 27, the storyline rivalry between HMK and JWP was blown off, when Hanako Nakamori, Kaori Yoneyama and Morii were defeated in a six-woman tag team match by Nakajima, Bolshoi and freelancer and AtoZ alum Kana, whom Nakajima had invited to the promotion, much to the dismay of Bolshoi. On February 17, Nakajima made her first successful defense of the JWP Openweight Championship against Kayoko Haruyama, avenging the pinfall loss from the tag team title match. In March, Nakajima and Bolshoi took part in the 2013 Tag League the Best, defeating Leon and Neko Nitta on March 3, before losing to Hanako Nakamori and Morii on March 31, as a result failing to qualify for the finals. On April 14, Nakajima defeated Yumiko Hotta in a No Holds Barred match for her second successful defense of the JWP Openweight Championship, avenging a tag team match loss against the World Woman Pro-Wrestling Diana representative from a month earlier. On April 25, Nakajima made her debut for Wrestling New Classic (WNC), taking part in a seven-way match for the WNC Women's Championship. The match, which also included Command Bolshoi, Kayoko Haruyama, Nikki Storm and Syuri, ended when Lin Byron pinned defending champion Makoto to become the new champion. On April 29, Nakajima took part in World Woman Pro-Wrestling Diana's second anniversary event, teaming with Command Bolshoi in a tag team match, where they defeated Megumi Yabushita and Piyota Mask. Later in the semi-main event, Nakajima interfered in a WWWD Tag Team Championship match, helping Keiko Aono and Yumiko Hotta defeat Kaoru Ito and Tomoko Watanabe for the title, aligning herself with Hotta's Bousou-gun stable and turning heel for the first time in her career. Back in JWP on May 5, Nakajima's friendship with Kana exploded into a storyline rivalry between the two, when Kana submitted Nakajima at the end of a heated tag team match. Post-match, Nakajima and Kana came to blows, before being separated by other JWP wrestlers. This new rivalry also led to matches between Nakajima and Kana in other promotions, including Osaka Pro Wrestling and Pro Wrestling Wave. In the latter promotion, Nakajima entered the 2013 Catch the Wave tournament on May 15, defeating Shuu Shibutani in her first round-robin match. Nakajima finished her round-robin block on June 19 with a record of two wins, three draws and one loss, suffered against Mio Shirai, and advanced to the knockout stage. On July 15, Nakajima first defeated Shuu Shibutani in her first round match and then Syuri in her semifinal match to advance to the finals of the 2013 Catch the Wave, where she was defeated by Misaki Ohata. Back in JWP on July 28, Nakajima defeated Command Bolshoi to not only make her third successful defense of the JWP Openweight Championship, but to also win the CMLL-Reina International Championship. On August 18, Nakajima lost the JWP Openweight Championship to Kana in her third title defense, ending her reign at 237 days.

Following the loss of her title, Nakajima began portraying a darker, brooding persona and while she talked about a possible rematch with Kana, she went on a losing streak against Kazuki and Leon. On September 29, Nakajima returned to WNC, however, her match with Makoto had to be ended early, when she dislocated her right shoulder and had to be rushed to a hospital. Nakajima returned to the ring on October 14, wrestling Bolshoi in a three-minute exhibition match. Nakajima wrestled her official return match on October 18 at a World Woman Pro-Wrestling Diana event. During a tag team match, where she and Kyoko Inoue faced Yumiko Hotta and Mask de Sun, Nakajima turned on Inoue and joined Hotta's Bousou-gun stable, vowing to show her violent side in the future. Following the turn, Nakajima began making regular appearances for Diana as a representative of Bousou-gun. Back in JWP, Nakajima entered a storyline, where Kana began professing her love for her, even naming Nakajima the next challenger to her JWP Openweight Championship. On December 15, Nakajima defeated Kana to regain the JWP Openweight Championship. That same evening, Nakajima won her second JWP MVP award in a row, while her match with Kana that same day was named the 2013 Match of the Year. Prior to the title win, Nakajima had agreed to a double title match with World of Stardom Champion Io Shirai on the condition that she could regain the JWP Openweight Championship. The day after her title win, the match, where both titles would be on the line, was made official for World Wonder Ring Stardom's year-end event on December 29. The match ended in a thirty-minute time limit draw, meaning that both champions retained their titles. Meanwhile, Nakajima continued her rivalry with Kana, with the two forming a dysfunctional tag team for the 2014 Tag League the Best. On February 25, Nakajima wrestled her first deathmatch, booked by Kana as part of her independent Kana ProMania event, where she and Jun Kasai were defeated by Ayako Hamada and Ryuji Ito. Despite their issues with each other, Nakajima and Kana entered the final day of the round-robin portion of the Tag League the Best on March 2 with a chance to reach the finals. They were, however, eliminated after wrestling Command Bolshoi and Kyoko Kimura to a twenty-minute time limit draw. This led to a match on April 20, where Nakajima made her second successful defense of the JWP Openweight Championship against Kimura. Nakajima continued her reign with successful title defenses against Sendai Girls' Pro Wrestling representative Dash Chisako on July 13, Leon on September 15, and Hanako Nakamori on October 26.

After her win over Nakamori, Nakajima nominated Ice Ribbon's ICE×∞ Champion Tsukasa Fujimoto as her next challenger. Fujimoto later answered Nakajima with a nomination of her own, leading to JWP and Ice Ribbon announcing a double title match for December 28 at Korakuen Hall. First at Ribbon Mania 2014, Ice Ribbon's biggest annual event, Fujimoto would defend the ICE×∞ Championship against Nakajima and six hours later at JWP–Climax 2014, JWP's biggest event of the year, Nakajima would defend the JWP Openweight Championship against Fujimoto. Meanwhile, the storyline between Nakajima and Kana resurfaced in the Reina Joshi Puroresu promotion, the former Reina X World, where Kana, the promotion's consultant, named Nakajima her partner for a tournament for the vacant Reina World Tag Team Championship. On November 20, Nakajima and Kana first defeated Eri and Haruka Kato and then Lin Byron and Syuri to win the tournament and become the new champions. On December 7, Nakajima came together with Hanako Nakamori to unsuccessfully challenge Command Bolshoi and Kyoko Kimura for the JWP Tag Team and Daily Sports Women's Tag Team Championships. On December 28, Nakajima first unsuccessfully challenged Fujimoto for the ICE×∞ Championship at Ribbon Mania 2014, before defeating her for her sixth successful defense of the JWP Openweight Championship at JWP–Climax 2014. The following day, Nakajima was named JWP's MVP for the third year in a row, while her title defense against Leon was named the Match of the Year. On February 25, 2015, at Kana's KanaProMania: Advance event, Nakajima and Kana lost the Reina World Tag Team Championship to Hikaru Shida and Syuri. On April 5, Nakajima's sixteen-month reign as the JWP Openweight Champion came to an end, when she was defeated by Kayoko Haruyama in her seventh title defense.

In June 2015, Nakajima formed a tag team named Best Friends with Ice Ribbon wrestler Tsukasa Fujimoto, with the two stating that their goal was to become the top tag team in all of joshi puroresu. On October 17, Best Friends defeated another JWP/Ice Ribbon team of Aoi Kizuki and Kayoko Haruyama to win the International Ribbon Tag Team Championship. On December 27, Best Friends won two more titles, when they defeated the Jumonji Sisters (Dash Chisako and Sendai Sachiko) for the Daily Sports Women's Tag Team and JWP Tag Team Championships. Following the win, Nakajima turned on JWP and Command Bolshoi and joined JWP Openweight Champion Mayumi Ozaki's villainous Seikigun stable, based in the Oz Academy promotion. This led to a match on January 10, 2016, where Nakajima unsuccessfully challenged Sonoko Kato for the Oz Academy Openweight Championship. Nakajima turned on Ozaki and Seikigun on March 20, stating that she would bring the JWP Openweight Championship back to JWP. On April 3, Nakajima defeated Ozaki to win the JWP Openweight Championship for the third time. On June 24, Nakajima made her American debut for Shimmer Women Athletes, defeating Nicole Matthews at Volume 81. The following day on Volume 82, Nakajima challenged Madison Eagles for the Shimmer Championship, losing by disqualification when Eagles was attacked by Viper. Nakajima ended her Shimmer tour on June 26 by defeating Rhia O'Reilly on Volume 84 and Shazza McKenzie on Volume 85. On August 14, Nakajima and Fujimoto lost the Daily Sports Women's Tag Team and JWP Tag Team Championships to Hanako Nakamori and Kyoko Kimura in their fourth title defense. After four successful title defenses, Best Friends lost the International Ribbon Tag Team Championship to Hiiragi Kurumi and Tsukushi on September 19. On October 9, Nakajima lost the JWP Openweight Championship to Kyoko Kimura in her third defense. On November 3, Nakajima defeated Kimura to win the JWP Openweight Championship for a record-tying fourth time. Following the win, Nakajima announced her resignation from JWP, effective December 28. On December 28, Nakajima lost the JWP Openweight Championship to Hanako Nakamori in her final match under a JWP contract.

=== Seadlinnng (2017–present) ===
On January 26, 2017, Nakajima wrestled her first match as a freelancer for Seadlinnng, losing to the promotion's founder Nanae Takahashi in the main event. After the match, Nakajima stated that she would not give up until she defeated Takahashi and offered to join Seadlinnng, which was accepted by Takahashi. On October 3, 2018, Nakajima participated in an eight-woman single-elimination tournament to crown the inaugural Beyond the Sea Single Champion, as she advanced to the finals where she was defeated by Takahashi on November 1. On December 13, Nakajima, alongside Ayame Sasamura, defeated Borderless (Rina Yamashita and Yoshiko) to win the Beyond the Sea Tag Team Championship. Nakajima and Sasamura vacated the title on February 28, 2019, after Sasamura was sidelined with a leg injury.

On March 20, Nakajima and Sae defeated Himeka Arita and Miyuki Takase to win the vacant Beyond the Sea Tag Team Championship. The duo held the championship until April 28, when they lost the title to Himeka Arita and Miyuki Takase. On September 18, Nakajima defeated Takumi Iroha to win the Beyond the Sea Single Championship. On November 2, Nakajima successfully defended the title in a Hair vs. Hair match by defeating the inaugural champion Takahashi, forcing her to shave her head. On July 13, 2020, Nakajima lost the title to Yoshiko, ending her reign at 299 days with four successful title defenses. On October 3, Best Friends won the Beyond the Sea Tag Team Championship, when Fujimoto and Nakajima defeated Hiroyo Matsumoto and Yoshiko. On November 27, Best Friends lost the title to the team of Sareee and Yoshiko.

On January 23, 2021, Nakajima alongside Takahashi defeated the team of Sareee and Yoshiko to win the Beyond the Sea Tag Team Championship.

On April 21, 2024, Nakajima announced her retirement set for August 23. On August 23, 2024, in her retirement match, Nakajima teamed with Tsukasa Fujimoto losing to Hiroyo Matsumoto and Hanako Nakamori after being pinned by Matsumoto.

== Other media ==
In December 2015, Nakajima and Tsukasa Fujimoto released a cover of Rebecca's song Friends, which was also their entrance theme as a tag team.

== Championships and accomplishments ==
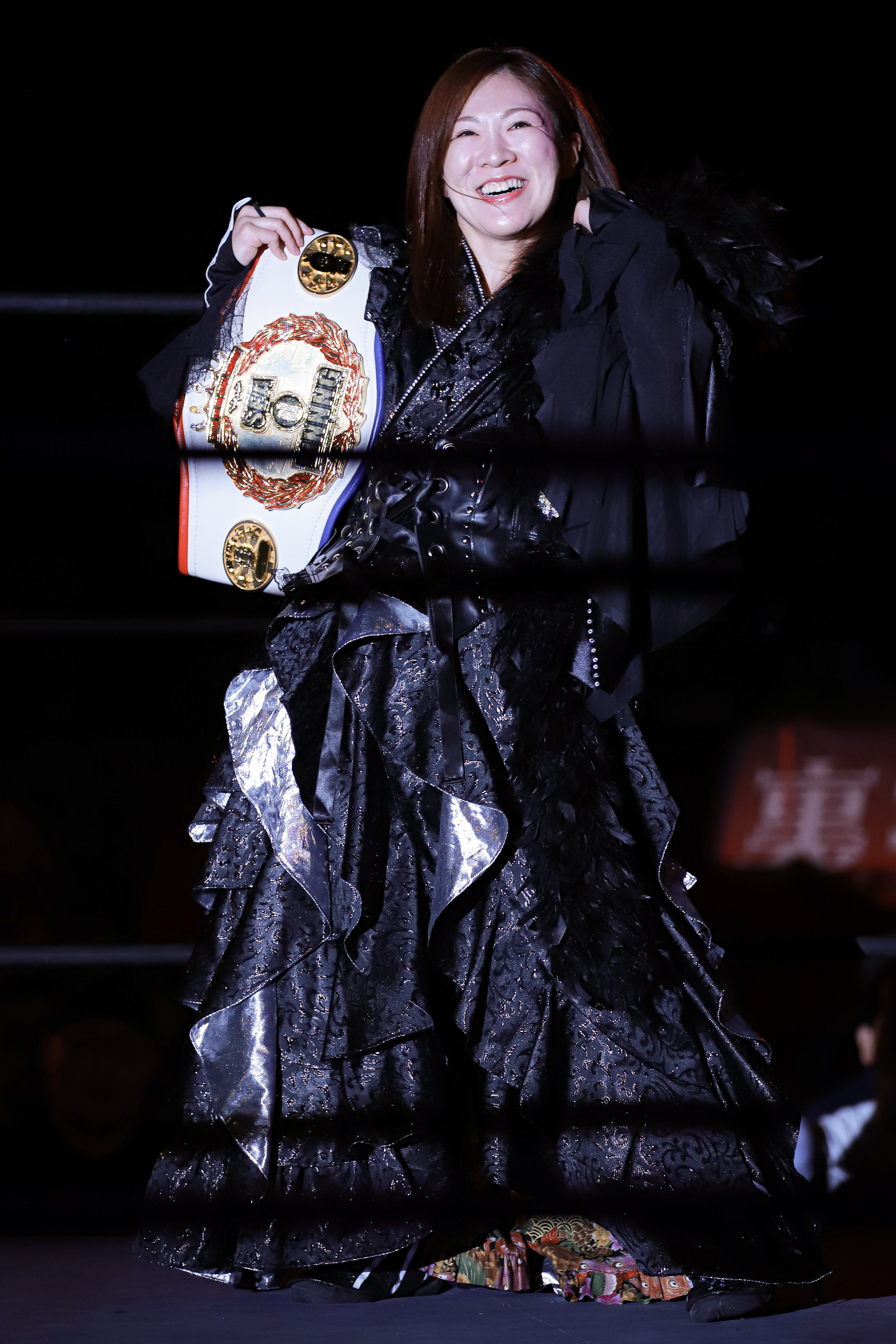
In Seadlinnng, Nakajima is a three-time Beyond the Sea Single Champion...

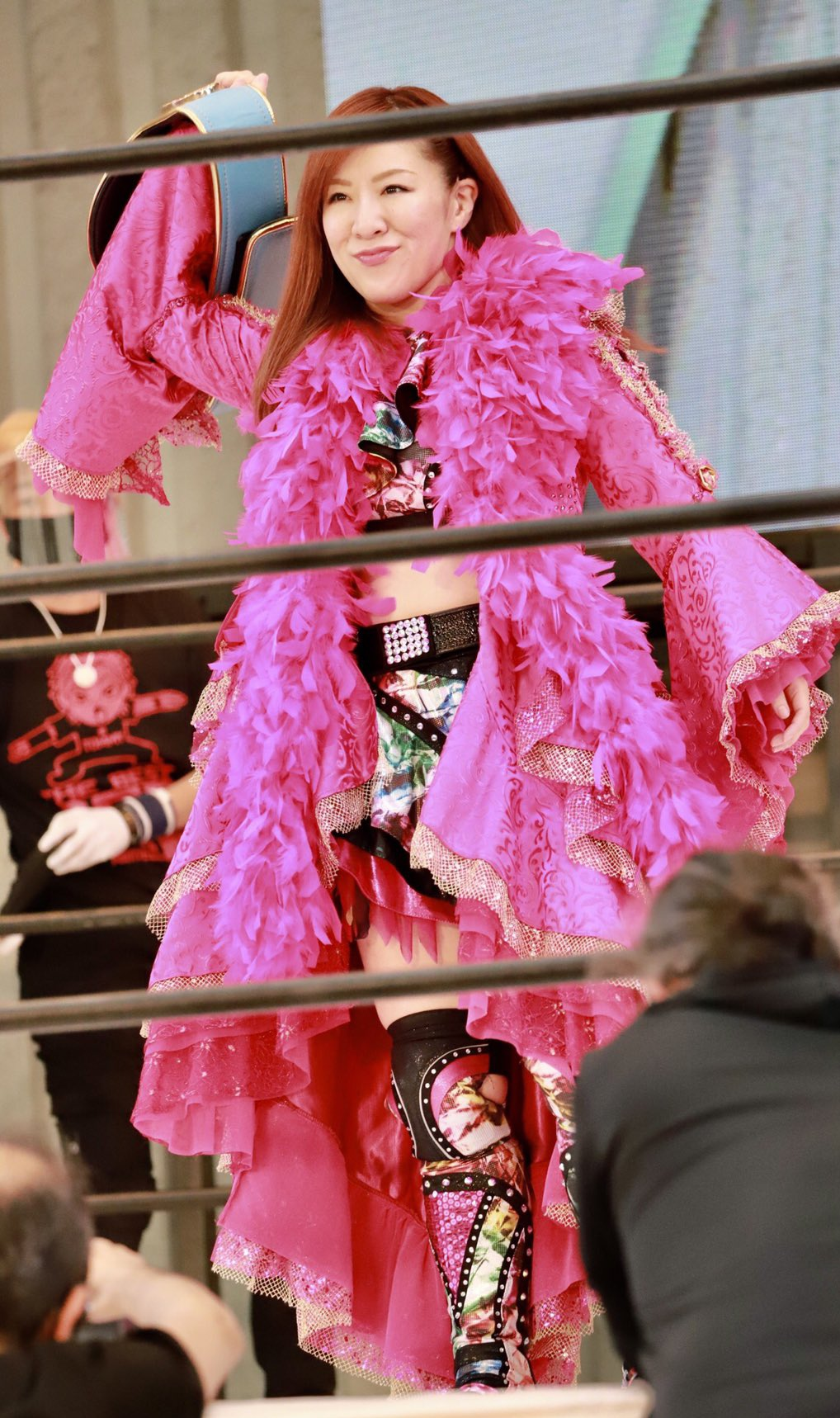
...and a four-time Beyond the Sea Tag Team Champion.

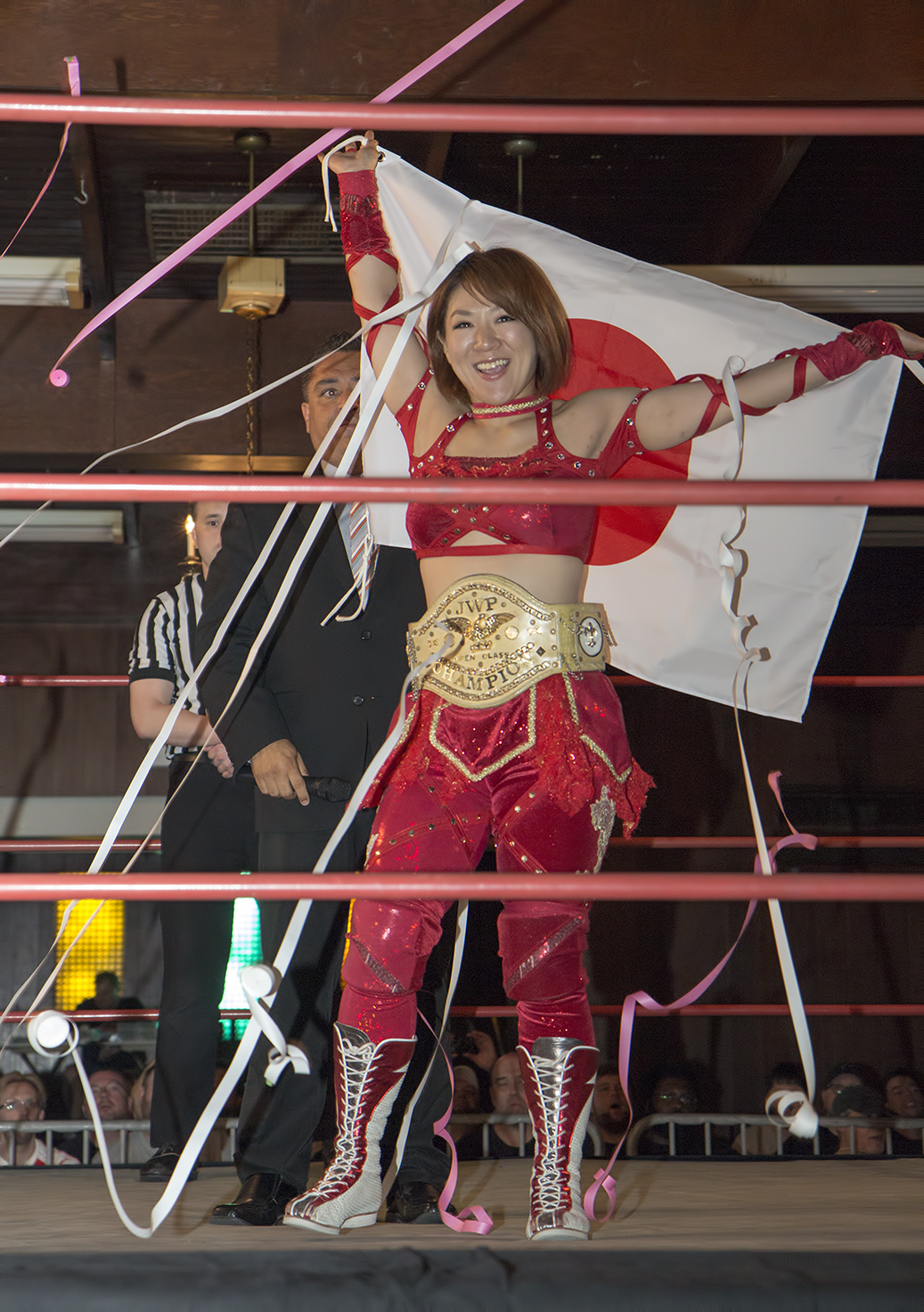
Nakajima has held the JWP Openweight Championship a record-equalling four times.

- Ice Ribbon
  - International Ribbon Tag Team Championship (1 time) – with Tsukasa Fujimoto
- JDStar
  - League Princess (2007)
- JWP Joshi Puroresu
  - Daily Sports Women's Tag Team Championship (2 times) – with Command Bolshoi (1) and Tsukasa Fujimoto (1)
  - JWP Junior Championship (2 times)
  - JWP Openweight Championship (4 times)
  - JWP Tag Team Championship (2 times) – with Command Bolshoi (1) and Tsukasa Fujimoto (1)
  - Princess of Pro-Wrestling Championship (2 times)
  - JWP Junior Championship Tournament (2006)
  - JWP Openweight Championship Next Challenger 1Day Tournament (2012)
  - 5th Junior All Star Best Bout Award (2007) with Hanako Kobayashi and Hiroyo Matsumoto vs. Aoi Kizuki, Aya Yuki and Tyrannosaurus Okuda on December 31
  - 5th Junior All Star MVP (2007)
  - Discover New Heroine Tag Tournament Best Match Award (2007) with Azumi Hyuga vs. Nanae Takahashi and Natsuki☆Taiyo on April 15
  - Discover New Heroine Tag Tournament Best Tag Team Award (2007) – with Azumi Hyuga
  - Discover New Heroine Tag Tournament Junior Wrestler of the Year Award (2007)
  - JWP Year-End Award (11 times)
    - Best Bout Award (2012) with Command Bolshoi vs. Emi Sakura and Kaori Yoneyama on August 19
    - Best Bout Award (2013) vs. Kana on December 15
    - Best Bout Award (2014) vs. Leon on September 15
    - Best Bout Award (2015) vs. Kayoko Haruyama on December 23
    - Best Bout Award (2016) vs. Hanako Nakamori on December 28
    - Fighting Spirit Award (2007)
    - MVP Award (2012–2014)
    - Newcomer of the Year (2006)
    - Outstanding Performance Award (2008)
- Oz Academy
  - Best Wizard Award (1 time)
    - Best Bout Award (2015) with Hikaru Shida and Hiroyo Matsumoto vs. Akino, Sonoko Kato and Tsubasa Kuragaki on August 23
- Pure-J
  - Pure-J Year-End Award (1 time)
    - Best Bout Award (2018) vs. Hanako Nakamori on December 9
- Pro Wrestling Illustrated
  - Ranked No. 34 of the top 150 female wrestlers in the PWI Women's 150 in 2022
- Reina Joshi Puroresu
  - CMLL-Reina International Championship (1 time)
  - Reina World Tag Team Championship (1 time) – with Kana
  - Reina World Tag Team Championship Tournament (2014) – with Kana
- Seadlinnng
  - Beyond the Sea Single Championship (3 times)
  - Beyond the Sea Tag Team Championship (4 times) – with Ayame Sasamura (1), Nanae Takahashi (1), Sae (1) and Tsukasa Fujimoto (1)
- Sukeban
  - Sukeban World Championship (1 time)

== Luchas de Apuestas record ==
Winner (wager)	Loser (wager)	Location	Event	Date	Notes
Arisa Nakajima (hair and championship)	Nanae Takahashi (hair)	Kawasaki, Kanagawa, Japan	Dynamic Show Case! ~ Kawasaki Monogatari	November 2, 2019	
