= Fuwa-chan =

Japanese comedian, YouTuber, and professional wrestler (born 1993)

- フワちゃん
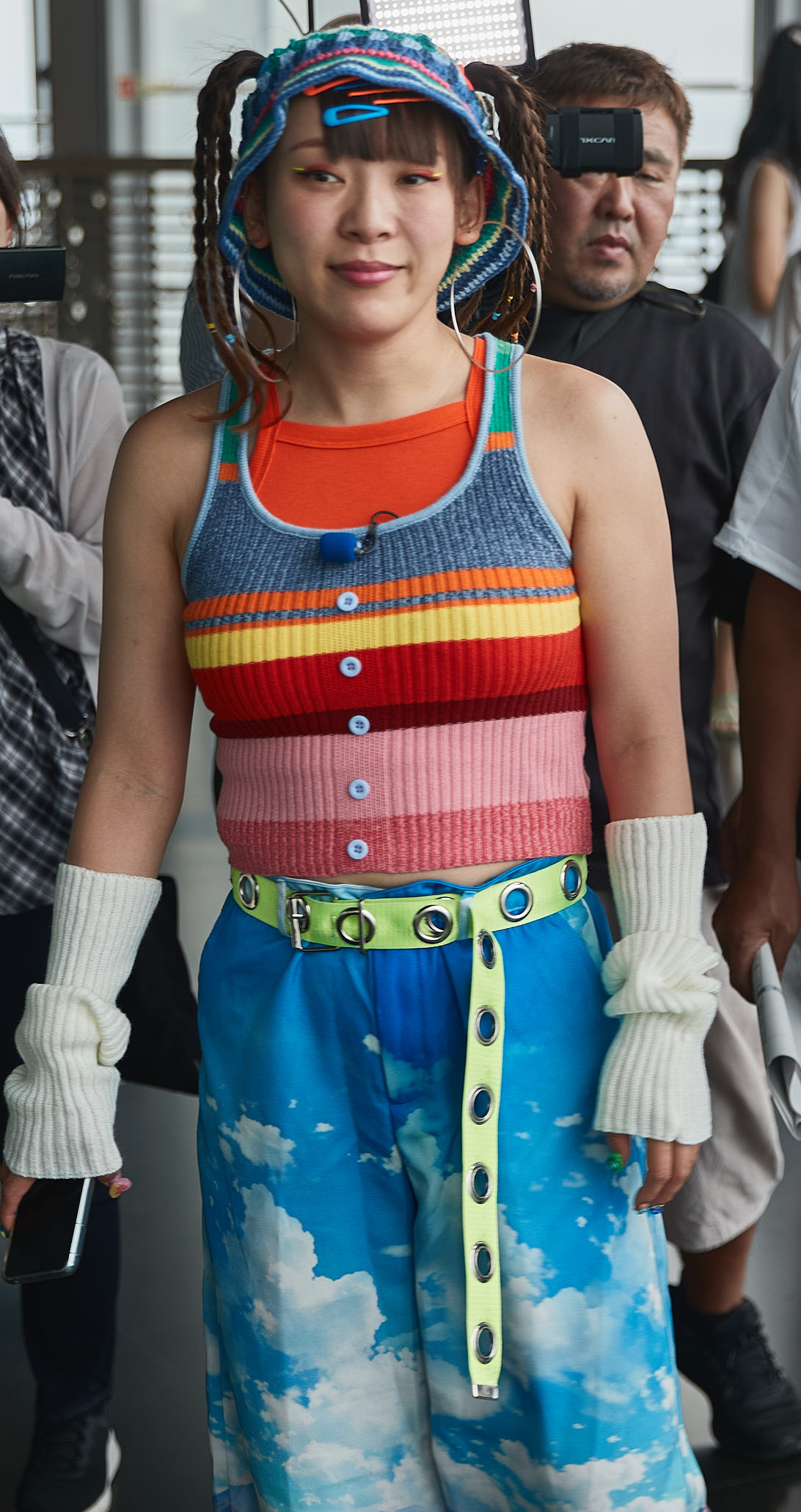
- Fuwa-chan in July 2024
- Born: Haruka Fuwa; November 26, 1993 (age 32); Hachiōji, Japan
- Occupations: Comedian; YouTuber; professional wrestler
- Years active: 2018–present

YouTube information
- Channel: フワちゃんtv /Fuwachan Tv
- Genres: Comedy; sport; travel
- Subscribers: 1.02 million
- Views: 1.29 billion
- Last updated: September 11, 2026

Haruka Fuwa (不破 遥香, Fuwa Haruka; born November 26, 1993), better known as Fuwa-chan (フワちゃん, Fuwa-chan), is a Japanese comedian, YouTuber, and professional wrestler. She is known for her blunt way of speaking and signature "devil horns" hairstyle. She is currently signed to World Wonder Ring Stardom.

== Early life ==
Haruka Fuwa was born in Hachiōji on November 26, 1993. Her mother was a homemaker and her father was self-employed in the import and export industry. The family later moved to the U.S. and settled in Los Angeles, where she lived from second to fourth grade in elementary school before returning to Japan at the age of 10. Throughout her childhood, she enjoyed devising new games and pranks. Her classmate, future voice actress Ayane Sakura, remarked that she was "like a typhoon". In March 2017, she graduated from Toyo University with a BA in Chinese philosophy. During her second year of university, she enrolled in the 18th class of the Watanabe Comedy School in Tokyo.

== Career ==
=== Comedy ===
Following her university graduation, Fuwa-chan pursued career as a comedian and formed a comic duo with a high school classmate, though this partnership ended in 2014. After that, she formed a partnership with another classmate, creating a comic duo named SF Century Space Child. After graduating from the Watanabe Comedy School in 2014, she joined the Watanabe Entertainment Company, but left in 2017 following a heated argument with an agency executive. In September 2017, Fuwa-chan launched her own YouTube channel Fuwa-chan's Woo-woo alongside TV Asahi director Takuro Samukawa. In April 2018, she launched another channel called Fuwa-chan TV, which reached 1 million subscribers in April 2023.

In July 2020, Fuwa-chan met with Tokyo Governor Yuriko Koike and broadcast messages to the public in Japanese and English about ways to reduce the spread of COVID-19. That same month, she received the Japan Council for Better Radio and Television's Galaxy Award for Notable Talent. In August, she participated in events such as the "R-1 Gran Prix" and in the "Final Battle of the W Competition" for the best female entertainer, an event jointly operated by Yoshimoto Kogyo and Nippon Television. As a result, her media presence increased sharply. She also became general MC of the TV Tokyo show Shichōsha-sama ni kawaretai! ("I want to be kept by my viewers!"). As a testament to her popularity, Jiyu Kokuminsha recognized "Fuwa-chan" as one of the most popular Japanese buzzwords in 2020. The noted sociologist Shōichi Ōta summarized Fuwa-chan's status by stating, "Fuwa-chan is like a mirror that reflects contemporary [Japanese] TV and society. We should keep an eye on her."

Fuwa-chan competed on the sports entertainment reality show Sasuke on 28 December 2021, but was eliminated in the first stage.

=== Early (2022) ===
Fuwa-chan was trained to be a professional wrestler by Hazuki and made her professional wrestling debut for World Wonder Ring Stardom at the 2022 Goddesses of Stardom Tag League on October 23, teaming with Hazuki in a losing effort against Saya Kamitani and Hina.

=== Return on Stardom (2025-Present) ===
After a long period of inactivity, Fuwa-chan returned to Stardom at the 2025 Goddesses of Stardom Tag League on November 7 to announce that she would re-debut at that year's Dream Queendom event.

== Yasuko controversy ==
On August 4, 2024, Fuwa-chan made a post mocking comedian Yasuko on her Twitter account and telling Yasuko to "kill yourself since you're not great" in response to a post Yasuko had made. The post was promptly deleted and Fuwa-chan apologized, which Yasuko accepted, but Fuwa-chan still received significant backlash online and elsewhere. Google Pixel commercials featuring her were taken down and comments were turned off on her YouTube videos. On August 11, she announced that she would go on hiatus as a result of the controversy.

== SASUKE ==
She joined SASUKE 39 on 28 December 2021. She was given #48. She failed Stage 1 at Fish Bone.

She joined SASUKE 40 on 27 December 2022. She was given #3948. She failed Stage 1 at Fish Bone.
