= Rina Yamashita =

Japanese Professional Wrestler (born 1989)

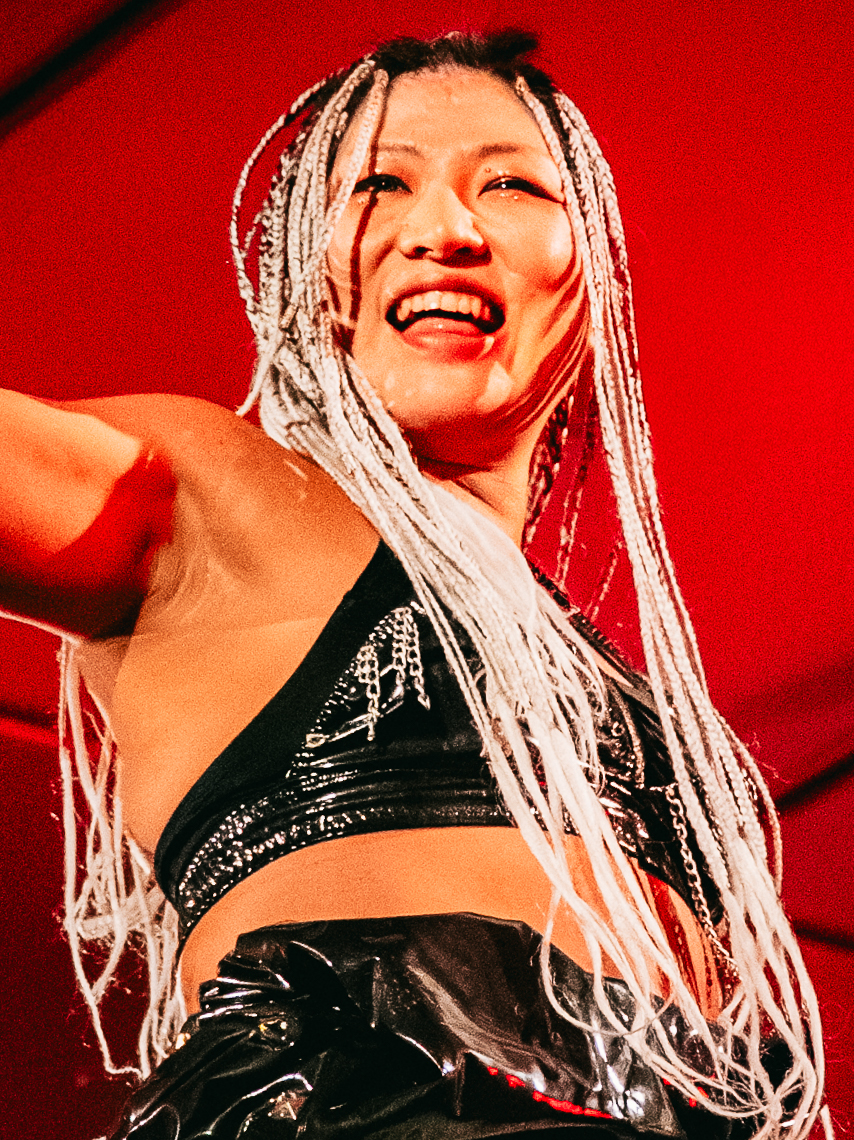
- Yamashita in April 2025

Personal information
- Born: March 12, 1989 (age 37) Satsumasendai, Kagoshima Prefecture, Japan

Professional wrestling career
- Ring name: Rina Yamashita
- Billed height: 165 cm (5 ft 5 in)
- Billed weight: 77 kg (170 lb)
- Trained by: Sawako Shimono
- Debut: 2013

Rina Yamashita (山下りな, Yamashita Rina) is a Japanese professional wrestler currently working as a freelancer and is best known for her time in Pro Wrestling Wave. She also appears in World Wonder Ring Stardom, where she is a part of Mi Vida Loca. In ChocoPro she is a former ChocoPro Super Asia Champion.

== Professional wrestling career ==
=== Independent circuit (2013–present) ===
==== Pro Wrestling Wave (2013–2018) ====
Yamashita made her professional wrestling debut at Pro Wrestling Wave's WAVE GAMI Libre 6, a house show from November 4, 2013, where she fell short to Kana. She continued to make notable appearances for the promotion such as at WAVE GAMI Libre - Lucky 7 from December 30, 2013, where she participated in a 77-person rumble match, competing against other popular superstars such as Danshoku Dino, Isami Kodaka, Minoru Suzuki, Sanshiro Takagi and others.

Yamashita took part in various notable tournaments of the promotion. She started with Catch The Wave 2014 Young Block, where she competed against Kaho Kobayashi, Sumire Natsu, Risa Sera, Fairy Nipponbashi and Shiori Akiba, scoring a total of five points. At the 2015 edition of seniors, Yamashita entered last as chosen by Mikiko Futagami and finished on the last position after competing against Kana, Hikaru Shida, Yumi Ohka, Ryo Mizunami, Misaki Ohata, Kaho Kobayashi, Maika Iida, Cherry and Sakura Hirota. Her best result was at the 2018 editionwhere she placed herself in the Block A, competing against Nagisa Nozaki, Ryo Mizunami, Yumi Ohka, Asuka and Miyuki Takase, winning it with a total of nine points, and defeating Ayako Hamada in the finals to win the tournament. She also competed in the 2014 Dual Shock Wave tournament where she teamed up with Sawako Shimono as Satsuma Kotsuji-gun, fighting Kyoko Kimura and Tomoka Nakagawa into a time-limit draw, succeeded by Yamashita falling short to Nakagawa in an overtime singles match. At the 2015 edition, she teamed up with Kaho Kobayashi as Fafrotskies, falling short to Haru☆kura (Kayoko Haruyama and Tsubasa Kuragaki) in a first-round match on October 2. At the 2016 edition, she scored her best performance, teaming up with Dynamite Kansai as GReeeeN, defeating Chōjin Shitei Konbi (Mika Iida and Yuki Miyazaki) in the first-round match, fWo (Fairy Nipponbashi and Kyusei Sakura Hirota) in the second-round match, obtaining a bye victory in the semi-finals, and finally picking up the decisive victory against Redbull (Chihiro Hashimoto and Ryo Mizunami) in the finals on October 10.

==== Various promotions (2014–present) ====
Yamashita began working for other promotions such as Pro Wrestling Noah, where at SEMex In Shinjuku Vol. 3 on October 2, 2014, she fell short to Kana. Another notable promotion for which she worked was JWP Joshi Puroresu, her best victory taking place at JWP Spring Hurricane In Osaka on April 26, 2015, where she defeated Rydeen Hagane to win both JWP Junior Championship and Princess of Pro Wrestling Championship. On May 17, 2015, Yamashita competed for Oz Academy at OZ Academy Reincarnation, event where she teamed up with Kaori Yoneyama and Sakura Hirota, falling short to Manami Toyota, Aja Kong and Dynamite Kansai. She worked a couple of matches for All Japan Pro Wrestling, at AJPW Starting Over 2017, where on November 6, she teamed up with Itsuki Aoki, first falling short to Fairy Nihonbashi and Saori Anou, but getting revenge in a second match against them pulling out a victory in less than 5 seconds. At Seadlinnng Grow Together! 2021 on March 17, Yamashita fell short to Asuka, failing to win the vacant Beyond the Sea Single Championship.

==== Ice Ribbon (2014–present) ====
Yamashita also works for Ice Ribbon, making sporadic appearances such as at Ice Ribbon #1117 from May 9, 2021, where she teamed up with fellow Rebel X Enemy stablemates Maika Ozaki and Ram Kaicho to defeat Banny Oikawa, Miku Aono and Hiroyo Matsumoto in a six-man tag team match. At Ice Ribbon #1100 ~ RE:BORN 2021 on February 20, she unsuccessfully challenged Tsukasa Fujimoto for the ICE Cross Infinity Championship.

==== Game Changer Wrestling (2022–present) ====
At GCW Homecoming: Part 1 on 13 August 2022, Yamashita defeated Alex Colon to win the GCW Ultraviolent Championship.

=== World Wonder Ring Stardom ===
==== Mi Vida Loca (2025-present) ====
On April 24, 2025, Yamashita and Itsuki Aoki were Suzu Suzuki mystery partners, going on to defeat Mei Seira, Miyu Amasaki, and Kohaku at Korkuen hall. After the match, Suzuki would then announce a new faction called, Mi Vida Loca, along with Akira Kurogane requesting to the newly formed unit.

== Championships and accomplishments ==
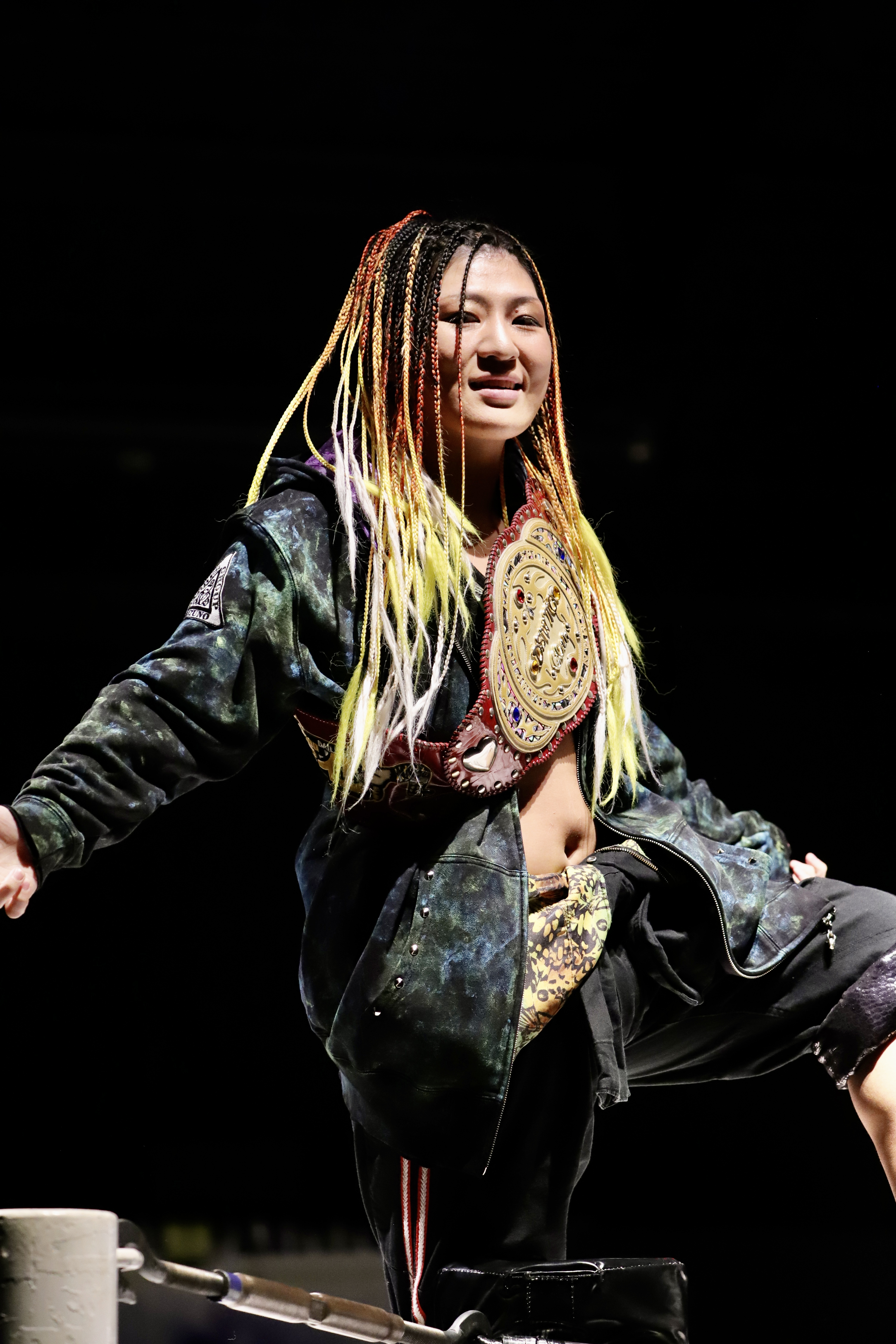
Yamashita is a former one-time Daily Sports Women's Tag Team Champion

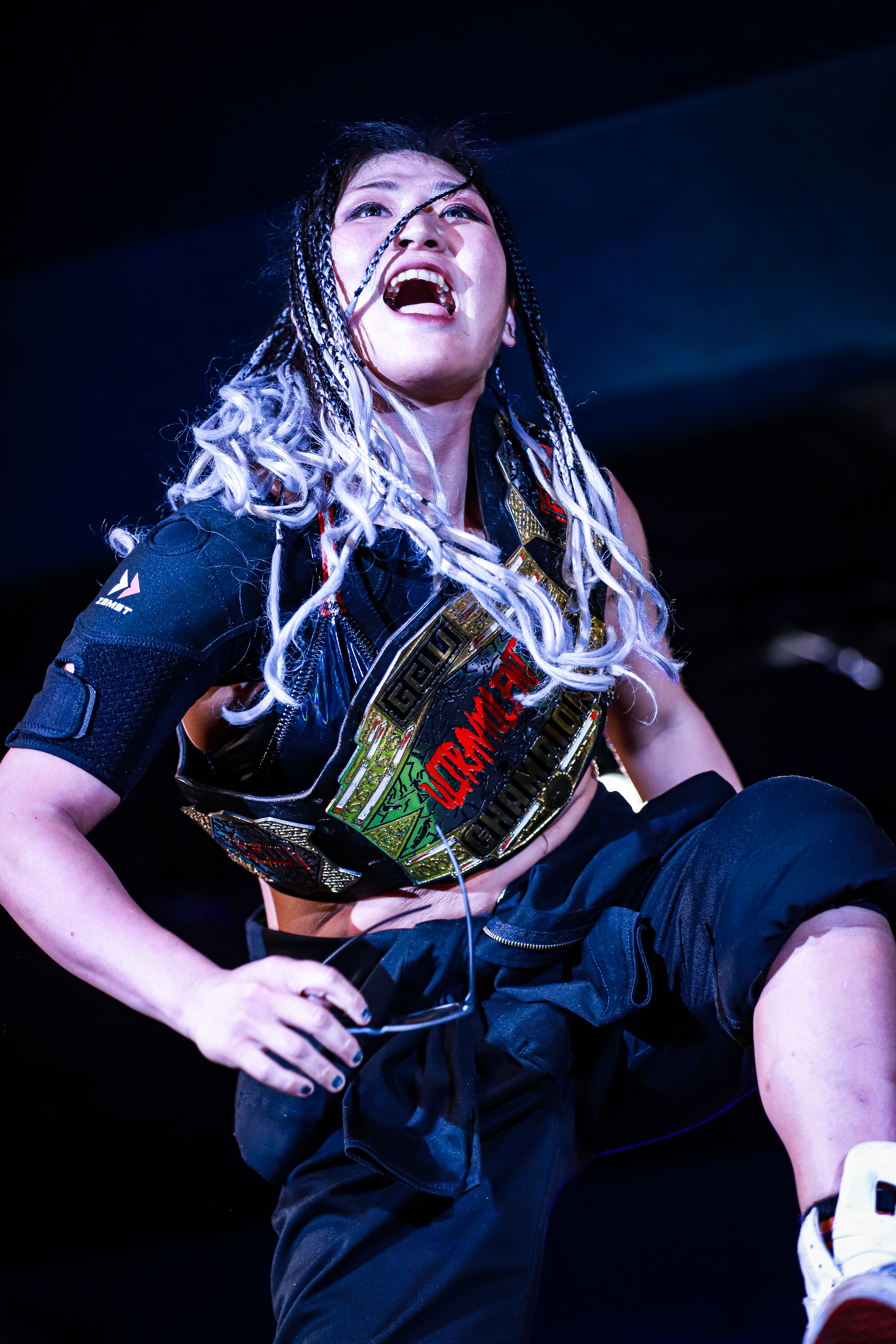
... and a Game Changer Ultraviolent Champion

- ChocoPro
  - Super Asia Championship (1 time)
- DDT Pro Wrestling

- Ironman Heavymetalweight Championship (2 times)

- Game Changer Wrestling

- GCW Ultraviolent Championship (1 time)

- Ice Ribbon

- FantastICE Championship (1 time)

- Japan Indie Awards

- Newcomer Award (2020)

- JWP Joshi Puroresu

- JWP Junior Championship (1 time)

- Oz Academy

- Oz Academy Tag Team Championship (2 times) – with Hiroyo Matsumoto (1) and Yoshiko (1)
- New Year's Makenokori Majiten Tournament (2025)

- Pure-J

- Princess of Pro Wrestling Championship (1 time)
- Daily Sports Women's Tag Team Championship (1 time) - with Hanako Nakamori

- Pro Wrestling Freedoms

- King of Freedom World Tag Team Championship (1 time) - with Minoru Fujita

- Pro Wrestling Illustrated
  - Ranked No. 67 of the top 150 female wrestlers in the PWI Women's 150 in 2022
  - Ranked No. 100 of the top 500 singles wrestlers in the PWI 500 in 2023
- Pro Wrestling Wave

- Regina Di WAVE Championship (1 time)
- Dual Shock Wave (2016) - with Dynamite Kansai
- Catch the Wave (2018)

- World Wonder Ring Stardom
  - 5★Star GP Award (1 times)
    - 5★Star GP Red Stars Best Match Award (2026) vs. Mei Seira on July 18 in Red Stars B
- Reina

- Reina World Tag Team Championship (1 time) - with Makoto

- Seadlinnng

- Beyond the Sea Tag Team Championship (1 time) - with Yoshiko
