= Itsuki Aoki =

Japanese professional wrestler

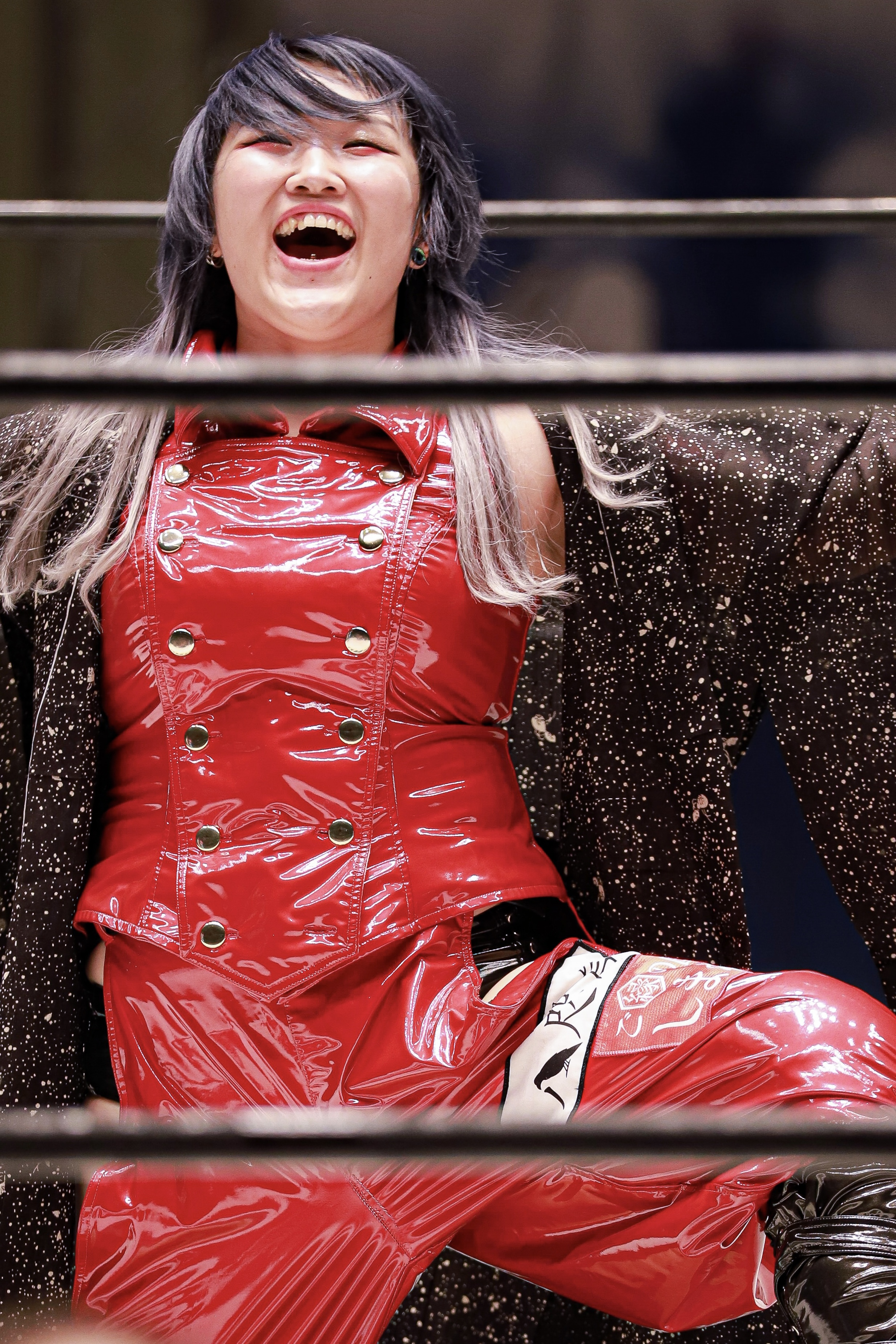
- Aoki in August 2023

Personal information
- Born: December 4, 1997 (age 28) Hamada, Japan

Professional wrestling career
- Ring name(s): Mede Tigirl; Itsuki Aoki; Shimane
- Billed height: 5 ft 2 in (157 cm)
- Billed weight: 143 lb (65 kg)
- Trained by: Japan Pro-Wrestling 2000
- Debut: 2017

Aika Aoki (青木愛香, Aoki Aika) better known by her ring name Itsuki Aoki is a Japanese professional wrestler currently working as a freelancer and is best known for her time in the Japanese promotions Oz Academy and Pro Wrestling Wave. She also appears in World Wonder Ring Stardom, where she is a member of Mi Vida Loca.

== Professional wrestling career ==
=== Independent circuit (2017–present) ===
As a freelancer, Aoki worked for various promotions. At AJPW Starting Over 2017 on November 6, she wrestled in two times, teaming up with Rina Yamashita in a losing effort to Saori Anou and Fairy Nihonbashi. They challenged them to an immediate rematch which they won. At ZERO1 Goen No Kuni Shimane Tour 2018 Masuda Convention, an event promoted by Pro Wrestling Zero1 on November 11, 2018, she fell short to Hiroyo Matsumoto. At BJW Osaka Surprise 40 ~ Thanksgiving Day 2018, an event promoted by Big Japan Pro Wrestling on December 23, 2018, she teamed up with Akino in a losing effort to Drake Morimatsu and Kaori Yoneyama. At SEAdLINNNG Grow Together!, an event promoted by Seadlinnng on November 4, 2020, Aoki teamed up with Ryo Mizunami as "Max Voltage" and Rina Yamashita in a losing effort to Las Fresa de Egoistas (Asuka and Makoto) and Saki Akai as a result of a six-woman tag team match.

=== Ice Ribbon (2018–present) ===
Aoki is also a part of Ice Ribbon's roster. At RibbonMania 2019 on December 31, she competed in a 44-person gauntlet match also involving Ken Ohka, Munenori Sawa, Hiragi Kurumi, Tsukushi, Syuri, Manami Toyota, Tsukasa Fujimoto and others. At Ice Ribbon New Ice Ribbon #1105 on March 20, 2021, Aoki teamed up with Satsuki Totoro to unsuccessfully challenge Rebel X Enemy (Maika Ozaki and Maya Yukihi) for the International Ribbon Tag Team Championship. At Ice Ribbon New Ice Ribbon #1100 on February 20, 2021 she unsuccessfully challenged Risa Sera for the FantastICE Championship.

=== Pro Wrestling Wave (2018–present) ===
Aoki made her debut in Pro Wrestling Wave at WAVE Osaka Rhapsody Vol. 40 on May 19, 2018 where she unsuccessfully challenged Cherry. At Kabuki-cho Week Ender on January 16, 2021, Aoki teamed up with Rin Kadokura to defeat Boss to Mammy (Mio Momono and Yumi Ohka) for the Wave Tag Team Championship. At WAVE NAMI 1 on January 1, 2021, Aoki competed in an 11-woman battle royal also involving Kaori Yoneyama, Saki, Yuki Miyazaki, Haruka Umesaki, Miyuki Takase and others.

She is known for competing in various of the promotion's signature events. One of them is Catch the Wave, making her first appearance at the 2021 edition of the event, placing herself in the Gatling Block and scoring a total of two points after going against Nagisa Nozaki, Saki and Yuu.

=== Oz Academy (2018–present) ===
Aoki made her debut in Oz Academy on May 4, 2018 at a house show where she competed in a battle royal also involving Sareee, Sonoko Kato, Alex Lee and others. At OZ Academy Come Back To Shima! on May 25, 2019, she won a battle royal also involving Himeka Arita, Hikari Shimizu, Kakeru Sekiguchi and others. At OZ Academy The Fortress on July 11, 2021, Aoki unsuccessfully challenged Kaori Yoneyama for the Oz Academy Openweight Championship.

=== World Wonder Ring Stardom (2025-present) ===
==== Mi Vida Loca (2025-present) ====
On April 24, 2025, Itsuki and Rina Yamashita were Suzu Suzuki mystery partners, going on to defeat Mei Seira, Miyu Amasaki, and Kohaku at Korkuen hall. After the match, Suzu would then announce a new faction called, Mi Vida Loca, along with Akira Kurogane requesting to join the unit.

== Championships and accomplishments ==
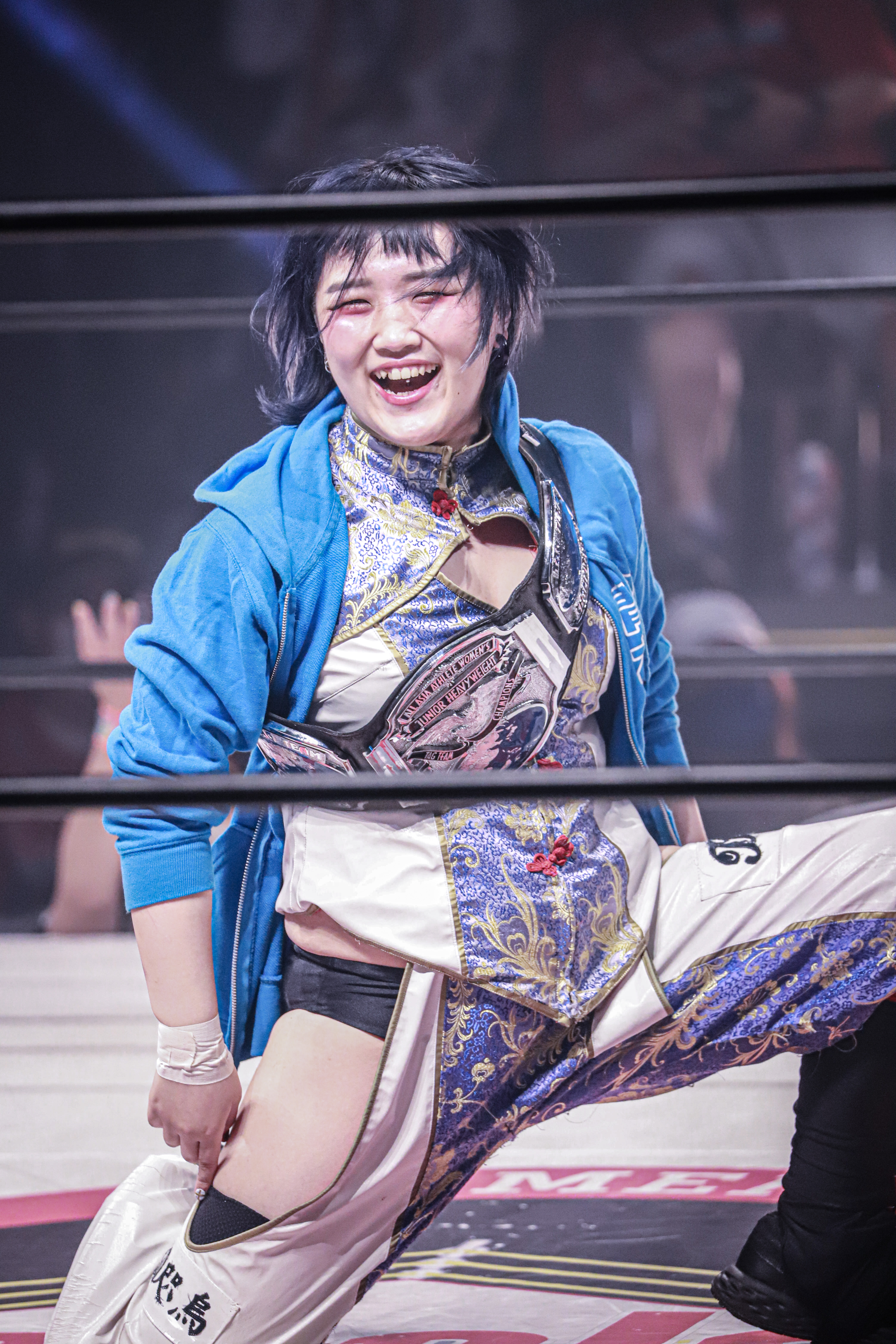
Aoki is a former AAAW Tag Team Champion

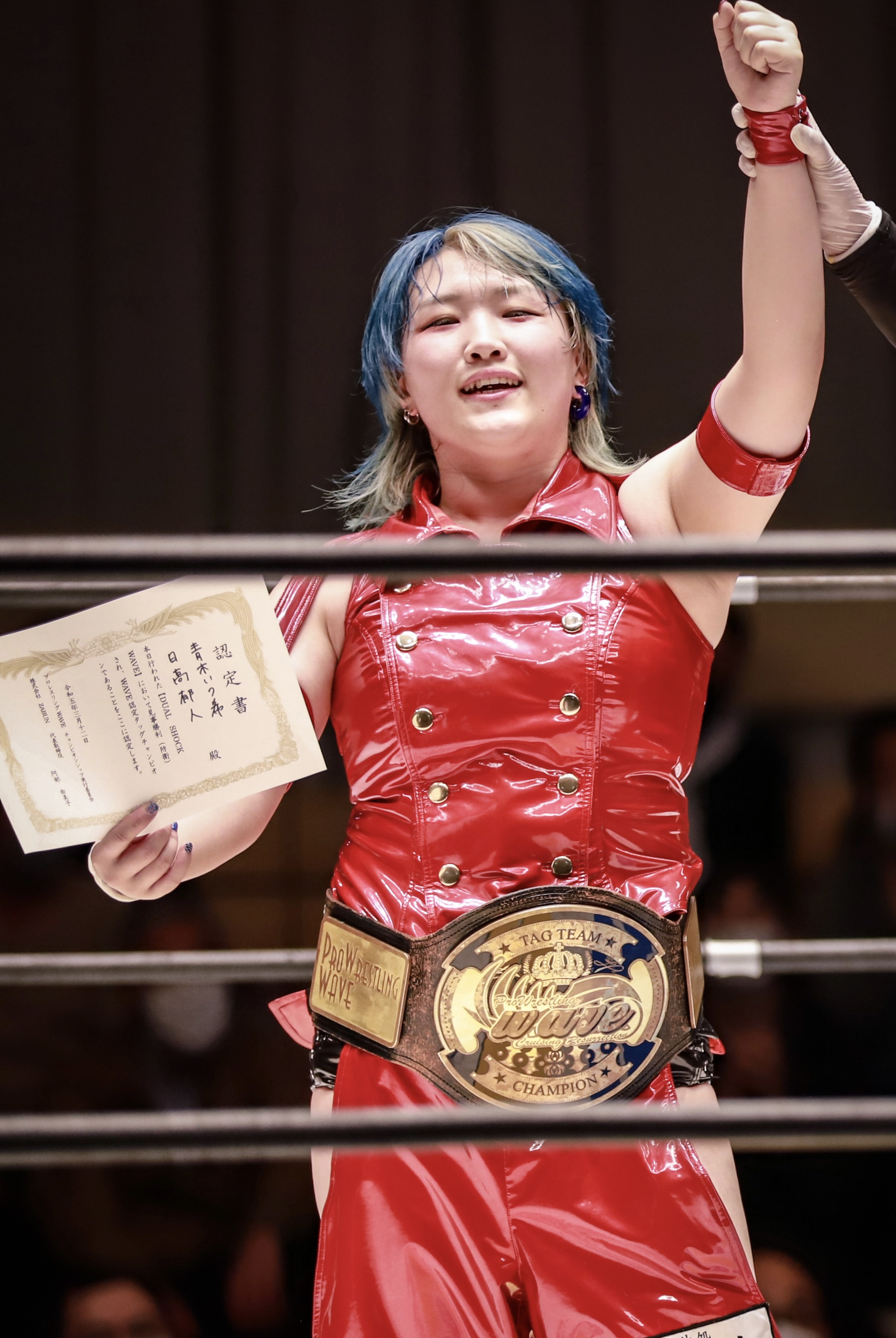
... and a two-time Wave Tag Team Champion

- Marvelous That's Women Pro Wrestling
  - AAAW Tag Team Championship (1 time) – with Rin Kadokura
- DDT Pro Wrestling
  - Hardcore Mixed Tag 1 Day Tournament (2022) – with Shigehiro Irie
- Oz Academy
  - Oz Academy Tag Team Championship (1 time) – with Tsubasa Kuragaki
  - Oz Academy Pioneer 3-Way Championship (1 time)
- Pro Wrestling Illustrated
  - Ranked No. 179 of the top 250 female singles wrestlers in the PWI Women's 250 in 2023
- Pro Wrestling Wave
  - Wave Single Championship (1 time)
  - Wave Tag Team Championship (2 times) – with Ikuto Hidaka (1) and Rin Kadokura (1)
  - Catch the Wave Award (4 times)
    - Best Bout Award (2023) vs. Ayame Sasamura on June 1
    - Best Bout Award (2024) vs. Kakeru Sekiguchi on May 5
    - Fighting Spirit Award (2022
    - Outstanding Performance Award (2023)
- Seadlinnng
  - Beyond the Sea Tag Team Championship (1 time) – with Ayame Sasamura
