= Mika Iida =

Japanese professional wrestler

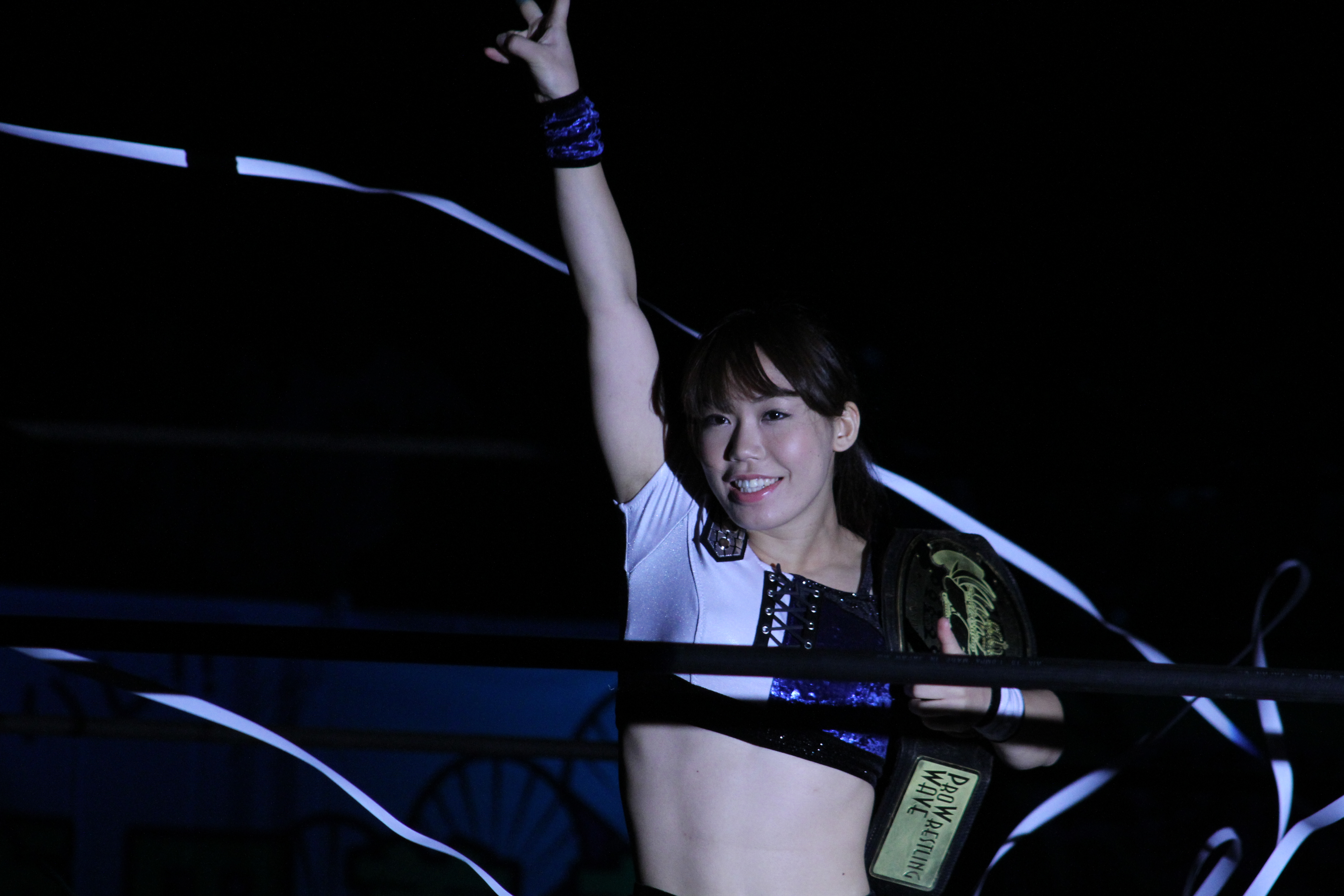
- Iida in September 2014

Personal information
- Born: March 23, 1992 (age 34) Higashitsugaru, Japan

Professional wrestling career
- Ring name(s): Mika Iida; Misaki Glico #2
- Billed height: 154 cm (5 ft 1 in)
- Billed weight: 50 kg (110 lb)
- Trained by: Ayumi Kurihara; Yuki Miyazaki; Yumi Fukawa; Tanny Mouse
- Debut: 2010
- Retired: 2018

Mika Iida (飯田美花, Iida Mika) is a Japanese retired professional wrestler best known for her tenures with Pro Wrestling Wave and Ice Ribbon.

== Professional wrestling career ==
=== Independent circuit (2010–2018) ===
During her career, Iida often made freelance work by competing in various promotions from the Japanese independent scene. Iida briefly competed in NEO Japan Ladies Pro-Wrestling. At NEO The Last Holy Fight In Itabashi Vol. 2 from December 26, 2010, one of the promotion's last shows before its closure, she competed in a battle royal won by Yoshiko Tamura and also involving many notable opponents such as Kayoko Haruyama, Kyoko Inoue, Megumi Yabushita, Mima Shimoda, Riho, Ran Yu-Yu and many others. She once stepped into a World Wonder Ring Stardom ring at a house show promoted on October 3, 2012, where she wrestled Makoto into a time-limit draw. On the second night of Pro Wrestling Zero1's The Edge Of The Country Shimane Tour 2016 from November 13, she defeated Sumire Natsu. At JWP Fly High In The 25th Anniversary In Sendai, an event promoted by JWP Joshi Puroresu on December 4, 2016, she fell short to Kazuki in singles competition. At SEAdLINNNG Has Come, an event promoted by Seadlinnng on March 21, 2018, she competed in a intergender three-way match won by Naoki Tanizaki and also involving Sean Guinness.

=== Ice Ribbon (2011–2018) ===
Due to Pro Wrestling Wave and Ice Ribbon holding business partnerships, Iida competed many times in the latter promotion's events. She made her first appearance at Ice Ribbon New Ice Ribbon #253 on January 8, 2011, where she fell short to Hamuko Hoshi. At Ice Ribbon 19'O Clock Girls Pro Wrestling #65 on March 22, 2011, she unsuccessfully challenged Tsukasa Fujimoto in the semifinals of a tournament to crown a new IW19 Champion. At Ice Ribbon New Ice Ribbon #666 on July 29, 2015, Iida competed in a gauntlet match won by Tsukasa Fujimoto and also involving various other opponents such as Pantera Rosa, Akane Fujita, Aja Kong, Arisa Nakajima, Konami, Leon, Tsukushi Haruka, Mayumi Ozaki and others.

=== Pro Wrestling Wave (2010–2018) ===
Iida is probably best known for her time in Pro Wrestling Wave. She made her professional wrestling debut at WAVE Launch WAVE on December 5, 2010, where she competed in an 18-woman royal rumble match won by Toshie Uematsu and also involving Cherry, Command Bolshoi, Gami, Kana, Kaori Yoneyama, Yoshiko Tamura, Yumi Ohka and many others. The only championship she has held in the promotion was the Wave Tag Team Championship which she succeeded in winning at Happy Anniversary Wave: Seven on August 24, 2014, by defeating reigning champions Yankii Nichokenju (Isami Kodaka and Yuko Miyamoto) in a Three-way intergender tag team match which also involved the team of Las Aventureras (Ayako Hamada and Yuu Yamagata). She unsuccessfully competed for the Wave Single Championship at Happy New Year WAVE 2018 on January 7, 2018, after she fell short to Yumi Ohka.

Iida competed in various of the promotion's signature events such as the Catch the Wave, in which she made her first appearance at the 2011 edition of the event, where she fought in the Young block, scoring one point after competing against Kagetsu, Sawako Shimono and Nao Komatsu. Three years later at the 2014 edition, she competed in the "Tsuyayaka" block where she scored a total of six points after going against Hikaru Shida, Hiroyo Matsumoto, Misaki Ohata, Mio Shirai, Moeka Haruhi and Sawako Shimono. She made her last appearance at the 2015 edition where she competed in the only block available in which she scored a total of five wins, one draw and three losses after squaring up against Kana, Hikaru Shida, Yumi Ohka, Cherry, Ryo Mizunami, Misaki Ohata, Kaho Kobayashi, Sakura Hirota and Rina Yamashita.

As for the Dual Shock Wave, Iida made her first appearance at the 2012 edition of the tournament where she teamed up with Ayumi Kurihara as "Kurigohan", placing themselves in the block B where they scored a total of two points after competing against the teams of Kurigohan (Shuu Shibutani and Syuri), Shidarezakura (Hikaru Shida and Yumi Ohka), and 1st Impact (Makoto and Moeka Haruhi). At the 2014 edition, she teamed up with Sakura Hirota as "Sakuragohan" and made it to the finals where they fell short to Revolucion Amandla (Kyoko Kimura and Tomoka Nakagawa) in a match also contested for iida and Hirota's Wave Tag Team Championship. At the 2015 edition, Iida teamed up again with Hirota, this time receiving a bye to the semifinals where they fell short to Las Aventureras (Ayako Hamada and Yuu Yamagata). Iida made her last appearance at the 2016 edition of the tournament where she teamed up with Yuki Miyazaki and fell short to Dynamite Kansai and Rina Yamashita in the first rounds.

Iida retired from in-ring competition on May 4, 2018, at an event promoted specially for her farewell, the Final Battle: Mika Iida Thanks For The Meal!, where she fell short to Hiroe Nagahama in singles competition.

== Championships and accomplishments ==
- Pro Wrestling Wave
  - Wave Tag Team Championship (1 time) – with Sakura Hirota
  - Zan-1 (2017)
  - Catch the Wave Award (6 times)
    - Best Bout Award (2016) vs. Tsukushi on May 3
    - Fighting Spirit Award (2011)
    - Outstanding Performance Award (2014, 2015)
    - Technique Award (2015, 2016)
