= Sawako Shimono =

Japanese professional wrestler

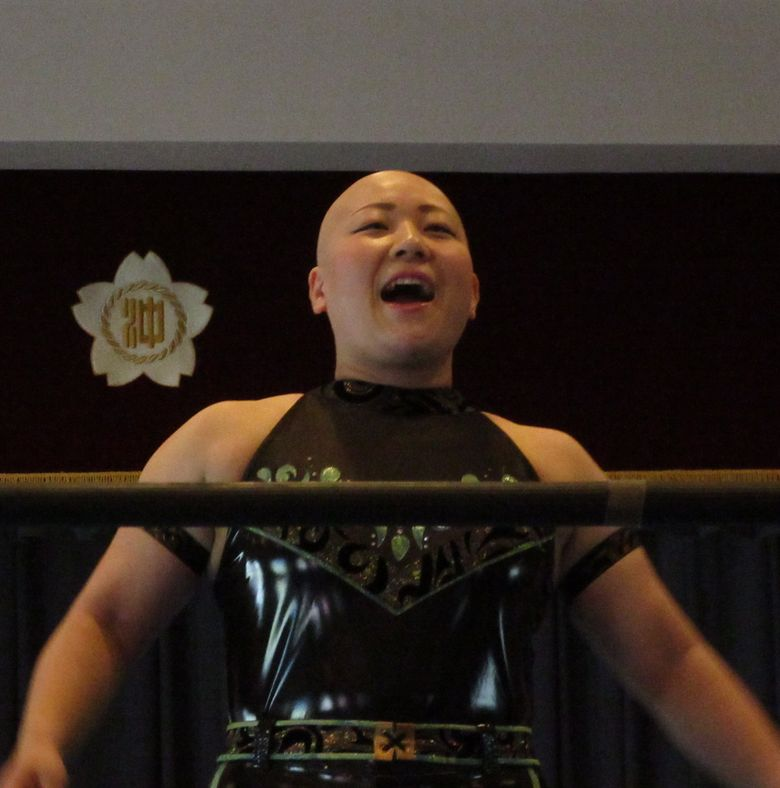
- Shimono in July 2016

Personal information
- Born: September 9, 1988 (age 37) Satsuma, Japan

Professional wrestling career
- Ring name(s): Sawako Shimotsuke; Sawako Shimono
- Billed height: 156 cm (5 ft 1 in)
- Billed weight: 65 kg (143 lb)
- Trained by: Rie Nakamura; Gami
- Debut: 2004
- Retired: 2019

Sawako Shimono (下野佐和子, Shimono Sawako) is a Japanese retired professional wrestler best known for her tenure with various Japanese promotions, such as Pro Wrestling Wave, JWP Joshi Puroresu and Osaka Women's Pro Wrestling.

== Professional wrestling career ==
=== Independent circuit (2004–2019) ===
Shimono made her professional wrestling debut at the age of sixteen at BJW Shopping Street Deathmatch In Rokukakubashi, an event promoted by Big Japan Pro Wrestling on August 29, 2004, where she defeated Tanny Mouse. Her second ever match occurred six years later on March 21, 2010, at a house show promoted by Osaka Women's Pro-Wrestling where she fell short to Kagetsu. At NEO Christmas Special, an event promoted by NEO Japan Ladies Pro-Wrestling on December 24, 2010, Shimono competed in a Christmas special battle royal won by Aya Yuuki and also involving Mima Shimoda, Sakura Hirota, Sendai Sachiko, Takako Inoue, Yuki Miyazaki, Yoshiko Tamura and others. At New Ice Ribbon #645 on May 4, 2015, she unsuccessfully challenged Hiragi Kurumi for the ICE Cross Infinity Championship. At a house show promoted by Sendai Girls' Pro Wrestling on May 21, 2016, Shimono teamed up with Aja Kong to defeat Meiko Satomura and Mika Iwata.

Shimono often competed in men's promotions as joshi talent. At Osaka Pro Saturday Night Story, an event promoted by Osaka Pro Wrestling on January 11, 2014, she defeated Ebessan and Kanjyuro Matsuyama in a three-way match. At NOAH SEMex In Shinjuku, an event promoted by Pro Wrestling Noah on May 21, 2015, she fell short against Kana. At BJW BJ-Style #7, an event promoted by Big Japan Pro Wrestling on May 22, 2016, Shimono teamed up with Speed Of Sounds (Hercules Senga and Tsutomu Oosugi) to defeat Miyako Matsumoto, Takumi Tsukamoto and Toshiyuki Sakuda in a six-person intergender tag team match. At DDT Ganbare Pro-Wrestling "Osaka Beer Garden Wrestling 2016", an event promoted by DDT Pro Wrestling's branch Ganbare☆Pro-Wrestling on July 25, 2016, Shimono teamed up with Rina Yamashita to defeat Chikara and Masayuki Mitomi.

=== JWP Joshi Puroresu (2010–2017) ===
Shimono made sporadic appearances for JWP Joshi Puroresu. She is known for competing in signature events of the promotion such as Tag League the Best, making her only appearance at the 2016 edition of the tournament where she teamed up with Kagetsu to defeat Command Bolshoi and Rabbit Miu in the first-rounds but fell short to Makoto and Hanako Nakamori in the semi-finals.

=== Pro Wrestling Wave (2010–2019) ===
A promotion in which Shimono activated for almost a decade was Pro Wrestling Wave. She is known for competing in its signature events such as the Catch the Wave tournament, making her first appearance at the 2010 edition, placing herself in the "Young Block" and scoring a total of two points after going against Ryo Mizunami, Io Shirai, Misaki Ohata and Senri Kuroki. She made her last appearance at the 2016 edition, placing herself in the"Silver Gray" Block and scoring no points after competing against Yoshiko, Ayako Hamada and Kagetsu.

Another signature event in which she competed is the Dual Shock Wave, making her first appearance at the 2011 edition where she teamed up with Kagetsu only to fall short early in the first rounds against Ayako Hamada and Yumi Ohka. She made her last appearance at the 2016 edition of the event where she teamed up with Yuu Yamagata as "Daijo Thunder" and defeated Zettaizetsume (Hibiscus Mii and Kaho Kobayashi) in the first rounds and fell short to Redbull (Chihiro Hashimoto and Ryo Mizunami) in the second rounds.

On November 27, 2012, Pro Wrestling Wave hosted an event in partnership with Lucha Libre AAA Worldwide, the Virgin Mary Reina De Reinas 2012 where Shimono teamed up with Aya Yuuki in a five-way tag team match won by Makoto and Moeka Haruhi and also involving the teams of Hikaru Shida and Nagisa Nozaki, Ryo Mizunami and Yuu Yamagata, and Cherry and Shuu Shibutani. She participated in a 77-peron battle royal at WAVE GAMI Libre - Lucky 7 on December 30, 2013, match won by Gami and also involving various notable opponents such as Yapper Man #1, Yapper Man #2, Sanshiro Takagi, Taka Michinoku, Danshoku Dino, Minoru Suzuki, Kintaro Kanemura, Syuri, Menso-re Oyaji and many others. At WAVE Osaka Rhapsody Vol. 23 on January 15, 2014, Shimono teamed up with Kagetsu to unsuccessfully challenge Ayako Hamada and Yuu Yamagata for the Wave Tag Team Championship. At WAVE/OZ Academy OZABU Spin Off, an event produced in partnership with Oz Academy on June 7, 2015, Shimono competed in a 19-person battle royal won by Hiroyo Matsumoto and also involving Chikayo Nagashima, Manami Toyota, Mio Shirai, Tsubasa Kuragaki, Tsukasa Fujimoto and others.

Shimono retired from professional wrestling at WAVE Phase 2 OSAKA Reboot on April 28, 2019, show where she teamed up with Fairy Nihonbashi to defeat Hibiscus Mii and Kyusei Ninja Ranmaru.

== Personal life ==
Shimono has alopecia, an affliction which causes her distinctive bald head.

== Championships and accomplishments ==
- JWP Joshi Puroresu
  - JWP Junior Championship (1 time)
- Pro Wrestling Wave
  - Catch the Wave Award (1 time)
    - Outstanding Performance Award (2012)
- Pure-J
  - Princess of Pro Wrestling Championship (1 time)
