= Mikiko Futagami =

Japanese professional wrestler

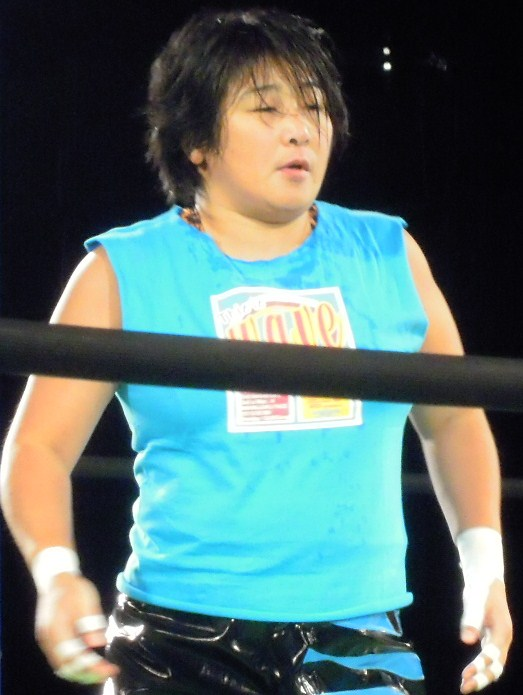
- Futagami in January 2011

Personal information
- Born: January 4, 1969 (age 57) Yao, Japan

Professional wrestling career
- Ring name(s): Sichuan Yuki Miyazaki; Dark Mask Bolshoi; Kyusei Ninja GAMI; Mikiko Futagami; Gami Metal; GAMI; Gami
- Billed height: 164 cm (5 ft 5 in)
- Billed weight: 73 kg (161 lb)
- Debut: 1991
- Retired: 2013 (initially); 2017

Mikiko Futagami (二上美紀子, Futagami Mikiko), better known by her ring name Gami (stylized in capital letters as GAMI), is a Japanese retired professional wrestler best known for her tenure with the Japanese promotions Pro Wrestling Wave, Arsion and JWP Joshi Puroresu.

== Professional wrestling career ==
=== Independent circuit (1991-2013) ===
Futagami made her professional wrestling debut at Seishin Kaikan The Premium, an event promoted by the Japanese independent scene on July 13, 1991 where she fell short to Hikari Fukuoka as a result of a singles match.

As a freelancer, she is known for competing in various promotions. On the fifteenth night of All Japan Women's Pro Wrestling's 2002 Japan Grand Prix from July 6, Futagami teamed up with Mika Akino in a losing effort against Kayo Noumi and Yumiko Hotta. At Battle Zone 6-7, an event promoted by New Japan Pro Wrestling on June 7, 2002, she teamed up with Bionic J, Faby Apache, Lioness Asuka and Mika Akino in a losing effort against Ai Fujita, baby A, Mariko Yoshida, Michiko Omukai and Rie Tamada. At Jaguar Yokota 30th Anniversary Convention, an event promoted by the Japanese independent scene on March 11, 2007, Futagami competed in a 32-woman battle royal won by Devil Masami and also involving Mariko Yoshida, Yuki Miyazaki, Sachie Abe and many others. At Sendai Girls Dantai Taikou Flash Tournament, an event promoted by Sendai Girls' Pro Wrestling on November 15, 2011, she teamed up with Toshie Uematsu, Yumi Ohka, Shuu Shibutani, and Moeka Haruhi as "Team Wave" in a losing effort against Team JWP (Command Bolshoi, Kayoko Haruyama, Kaori Yoneyama, Leon, and Hanako Nakamori) in a first-round match. At a house show promoted by Pro Wrestling Freedoms on April 25, 2012, Futagami teamed up with The Winger and Toshie Uematsu in a losing effort against Great Kojika, Antonio Honda and Ken Ohka. At New Ice Ribbon #518 on December 11, 2013, she teamed up with Hamuko Hoshi to defeat Risa Sera and Rutsuko Yamaguchi. At BJW Osaka Surprise 12 ~ Thanksgiving Day, an event promoted by Big Japan Pro Wrestling on November 23, 2013, Futagami teamed up with Team Heavy Metal (Madoka and Shinya Ishikawa) in a losing effort against Strong BJ (Daisuke Sekimoto and Yuji Okabayashi) and Yumi Ohka. At DDT Never Mind 2013, an event promoted by DDT Pro Wrestling on December 23, Futagami teamed up with Daisuke Sasaki and Antonio Honda in a losing effort against Kudo, Saki Akai and Yasu Urano.

==== Osaka Pro Wrestling (2009-2013) ====
Futagami worked for Osaka Pro Wrestling as joshi talent. At Osaka Pro Spring Samba Series on March 21, 2011, she teamed up with Black Buffalo and Tigers Mask to defeat Ebessan, Ultimate Spider Jr. and Yutaka in a six-man tag team match. She made her last appearance in the company on December 27, 2013 at Osaka Pro 4th Kanjyouro Matsuyama Produce Day where she defeated Matsuyama in a singles match.

==== Oz Academy (2005-2013) ====
Futagami is also known for competing in Oz Academy. At OZ Academy Rule Of Rose on November 4, 2011, she teamed up with Carlos Amano and Manami Toyota to defeat Ozaki-gun (Chikayo Nagashima, Hiren and Mayumi Ozaki). She made her last appearance for the company on December 8, 2013 where she wrestled Tomoka Nakagawa and Yuu Yamagata in a three-way match.

==== Pro Wrestling Wave (2007-2017) ====
Futagami is one of the founders of Pro Wrestling Wave alongside Tatsuya Takeshi and Yumi Ohka, and has competed in the promotion for a long period of time.

She is known for competing in the promotion's signature events such as the Catch the Wave tournament in which she made her first appearance on the inaugural edition of 2009 where she placed herself in the "Comical" Block, scoring a total of tying-three points alongside Bullfight Sora, Ran Yu-Yu and Cherry before wrestling them again in a four-way match to determine the advancing wrestler won by Sora. She scored her best result at the 2010 edition of the event, winning after competing in the "Visual Technical" Block where she scored a total of four points after fighting Yumi Ohka, Kana, Toshie Uematsu and Mio Shirai. She re-entered the tournament after winning a loser revival battle royal by toppling Asami Kawasaki, Cherry, Io Shirai, Kana and Misaki Ohata, and then by defeating Yumi Ohka in the semi-finals and capitalizing by picking a win over Ayumi Kurihara in the finals.

Another branch of events in which she worked is the Dual Shock Wave, making her first appearance in the 2011 edition where she teamed up with Tomoka Nakagawa, defeating Mio Shirai and Misaki Ohata in the first round, Ayako Hamada and Yumi Ohka in the quarter-finals, but falling short to Ayumi Kurihara and Kana in the semi-finals.

At Wave's 5th Anniversary on August 26, 2012, Futagami competed in a 28-person battle royal also involving Hikaru Shida, Sakura Hirota, Syuri, Aja Kong, Kyusei Ninja Ranmaru and others. At WAVE The Virgin Mary Reina De Reinas 2012, a cross-over event produced by Wave in partnership with Lucha Libre AAA Worldwide on November 27, 2012, she and her "Yoko Hatanaka" tag partner Tomoka Nakagawa failed to defend the Wave Tag Team Championship against Makkurokorosuke (Misaki Ohata and Tsukasa Fujimoto).

Futagami retired from professional wrestling on December 30, 2013 after winning a 77-person battle royal at WAVE GAMI Libre - Lucky 7 which involved lots of notable opponents such as Jun Akiyama, Danshoku Dino, Hibiscus Mii, Yapper Man #1, Yapper Man #2, Taka Michinoku, Meiko Satomura, Ray, Kintaro Kanemura and many others.

==== Short-lived return to professional wrestling (2015-2017) ====
Futagami came out of retirement to compete in several more matches. The first of them took place at WAVE Summer Fiesta 2015 ~ Ultra Show on August 28 where she competed in a 11-person battle royal also involving Fairy Nihonbashi, Hiroe Nagahama, Mika Iida and others. She competed in her last known match at Manami Toyota's Retirement Show from November 3, 2017 promoted by Oz Academy where she tagged with Sakura Hirota in a 2-on-1 handicap match against Toyota herself which ended in a time-limit draw. Futagami has been inactive as a wrestler ever since.

== Championships and accomplishments ==
- Arsion
  - Twin Star of Arsion Championship (4 times) – with Rie Tamada (2) and Lioness Asuka (2)
  - Twin Stars of Arsion League (2001) – with Rie Tamada
  - Zion Tournament (2001)
- Guts World ProWrestling
  - GWC 6-Man Tag Team Championship (1 time, inaugural) – with Guts Ishijima and Minami
- JDStar
  - TWF World Women's Tag Team Championship (3 times) – with Fang Suzuki (1) and Drake Morimatsu (2)
- JWP Joshi Puroresu
  - JWP Tag Team Championship (1 time) – with Command Bolshoi
- Ladies Legend Pro-Wrestling
  - LLPW 6-Woman Tag Team Championship (2 times) – with Carol Midori and Yasha Kurenai
- Pro Wrestling Wave
  - Wave Tag Team Championship (2 times) – with Tomoka Nakagawa
  - Catch the Wave (2010)
