= Sakura Hirota =

Japanese professional wrestler

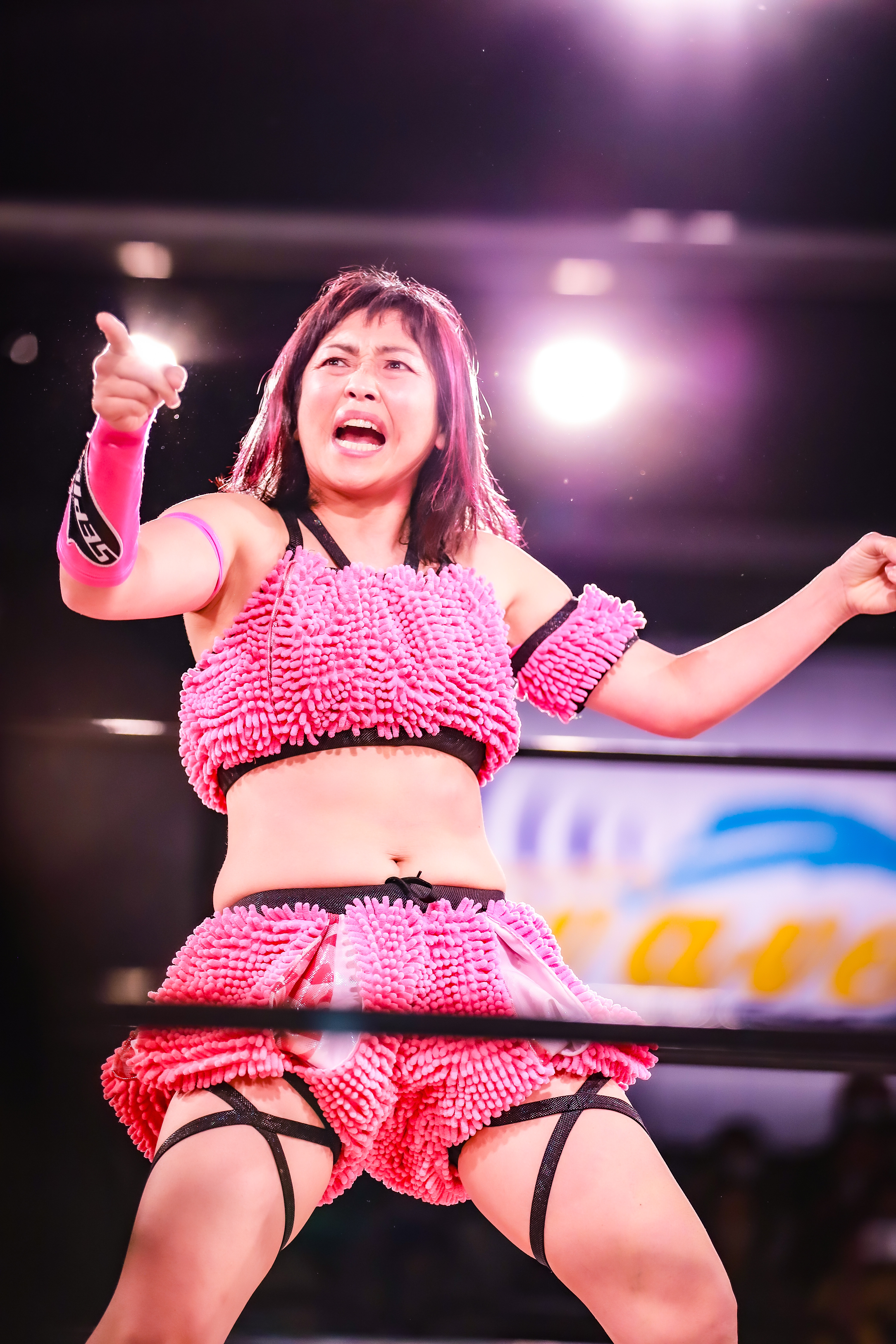
- Hirota in April 2023

Personal information
- Born: April 12, 1978 (age 48) Owariasahi, Japan

Professional wrestling career
- Ring name(s): Kyusei Ninja Sakumaru; Stan Hansen Hirota; Kinnikuman Hirota; Bolshoi Hirota; Sakura Hirota
- Billed height: 158 cm (5 ft 2 in)
- Billed weight: 58 kg (128 lb)
- Trained by: Chigusa Nagayo
- Debut: 1996

Sakura Hirota (広田さくら, Hirota sakura) is a Japanese politician and professional wrestler. She is currently a freelancer who is best known for her tenure with the Japanese promotions Gaea, Pro Wrestling Wave and Oz Academy.

Hirota's later career is characterized by being a comedy wrestler who oft appears as a doppelgänger of other wrestlers, dressing up as and portraying their mannerisms in an exaggerated, poorly executed way for comedic effect. Hirota sometimes even ironically imitates her own opponent, examples include: Saki Akai and Asuka. She tentatively retired on June 2, 2025, due to her pursuing a career in politics; in the process, she left Pro Wrestling Wave. However she resumed full time activity in August 2025 as a result of having lost her local House of Councillors election. She became representative of the Katsushika Ward Assembly in Tokyo as of 2026, a result of winning the assembly election in November 2025.

== Professional wrestling career (1996-2025) ==
=== Independent circuit (1996-2025) ===
Hirota made her professional wrestling debut at AJW Discover New Heroine, an event promoted by All Japan Women's Pro-Wrestling on August 12, 1996 where she competed in a tag team tournament in which she paired up with her trainer Chigusa Nagayo, falling short to Aja Kong and Yoshiko Tamura in a first-round match.

As a freelancer, Hirota is known for working with various promotions. At WAVE The Virgin Mary Reina De Reinas 2012, a cross-over event produced by Pro Wrestling Wave in partnership with Lucha Libre AAA Worldwide on November 27, 2012, Hirota scored a victory over Ran Yu-Yu. At JWP Recapture In Shinjuku, an event promoted by JWP Joshi Puroresu on October 25, 2015, she teamed up with Kazuki in a losing effort to Hanako Nakamori and Makoto. At Seadlinnng The Second Match ~ Up To You! from November 25, 2015, Hirota teamed up with Emi Sakura in a losing effort to Takako Inoue and Yumiko Hotta. At the finals of the 2020 D-Oh Grand Prix of DDT Pro Wrestling from December 28, 2018, she fell short to Saki Akai. At Hana Kimura Memorial Show, a show which portraited one year since the passing of Hana Kimura on May 23, 2021, Hirota competed in a 28-person All-Star Battle Royal which also involved Cima, Masato Tanaka, Yusuke Kodama, Jun Kasai, Jinsei Shinzaki and many others.

==== Ice Ribbon (2012-2019) ====
She had her first match for Ice Ribbon at New Ice Ribbon #424 from October 28, 2012 she teamed up with Hamuko Hoshi to defeat Cherry and Meari Naito. At New Ice Ribbon #696 on December 5, 2015, she unsuccessfully challenged Neko Nitta and Kyuri for the Triangle Ribbon Championship in a three-way match.

==== Oz Academy (2011-2025) ====
Hirota has a tenure with Oz Academy. At Heart on Wave on September 23, 2014 she teamed up with Mayumi Ozaki as "Ozakura Princess" defeated Aja Kong and Tsubasa Kuragaki in the finals of a five tag team tournament to win the vacant Oz Academy Tag Team Championship. At WAVE/OZ Academy OZABU Spin Off, a cross-over event promoted by both Oz Academy and Pro Wrestling Wave on June 7, 2015, she competed in a 19-person battle royal also involving Tsubasa Kuragaki, Mio Shirai, Kaori Yoneyama, Manami Toyota and others.

==== Sendai Girls' Pro Wrestling (2011-2025) ====
Hirota is also known for her tenure with Sendai Girls' Pro Wrestling. At house show hosted by the promotion on January 20, 2019, she participated in a 15-woman battle royal also involving notable opponents such as Alex Lee, Kaoru Maeda, Meiko Satomura, Sareee and others. At another house show from March 11, 2019 she unsuccessfully challenged Chihiro Hashimoto for the Sendai Girls World Championship.

==== Pro Wrestling Wave (2010-2025) ====
Hirota is known for competing in various of the promotion's signature events. One of them is Catch the Wave, making her first appearance at the 2014 edition of the event where she placed herself in the "Adeyaka" block and scoring a total of six points after competing against Yumi Ohka, Tsukasa Fujimoto, Tomoka Nakagawa, Kyoko Kimura, Shuu Shibutani and Yuu Yamagata. One year later at the 2014 edition of the tournament, she scored three victories and six losses after competing against the likes of Kana, Hikaru Shida, Mika Iida, Cherry, Ryo Mizunami, Misaki Ohata, Kaho Kobayashi and Rina Yamashita.

As for the Dual Shock Wave, she made her first appearance at the 2014 edition in which she competed against teams such as Fairy Family (Dynamite Kansai and Fairy Nipponbashi) and Merazoma (Melanie Cruise and Moeka Haruhi), she teamed up with Mika Iida as "Sakuragohan" and made it to the finals from October 15 where they also dropped the Wave Tag Team Championship to Revolucion Amandla (Kyoko Kimura and Tomoka Nakagawa). At the 2017 edition of the event she teamed up with Saki as "Pyonzu, Zu" and fell short to Natsu & Natsuri (Natsumi Maki and Sumire Natsu).

== Politics ==
On June 2, 2025, Hirota and Pro Wrestling Wave announced that Hirota would leave the company, and would start to become more involved in Japanese politics. She registered as a member of the Japan Innovation Party, a center-right populist party, to run for the House of Councillors' Aichi at-large district in the 2025 elections.

== Personal life ==
Hirota is a mother of twins, a boy and a girl. She once brought them at DDT All Out Day on July 29, 2019 since she did not find any babysitter for them. She previously stated that she was once a supporter of the Sports and Peace Party, which was run by Antonio Inoki.

== Championships and accomplishments ==
- Dragongate
  - Open the Owarai Gate Championship (1 time, current)
- Gaea Japan
  - One Night Tag Team Tournament (2004) – with Chigusa Nagayo
  - HHH Single Championship (24 times, comedy title)
- Oz Academy
  - Oz Academy Tag Team Championship (1 time) – with Mayumi Ozaki
  - Best Wizard Award (1 time)
    - MVP Award (2014)
- Pro Wrestling Wave
  - Wave Single Championship (1 time)
  - Wave Tag Team Championship (2 times) – with Yuki Miyazaki (1) and Mika Iida (1)
  - Catch the Wave Award (5 times)
    - Best Bout Award (2014) vs. Kyoko Kimura on May 13
    - Best Performance Award (2018) shared with Yuki Miyazaki
    - Best Performance Award (2024) with Kohaku vs. Honoka and Yuki Miyazaki on June 16
    - Fighting Spirit Award (2014)
    - Technique Award (2014)
- World Woman Pro-Wrestling Diana
  - WWWD Queen Elizabeth Championship (5 times)
  - WWWD Tag Team Championship (1 time) – with Yumi Ohka
