= Honoka (wrestler) =

Japanese professional wrestler

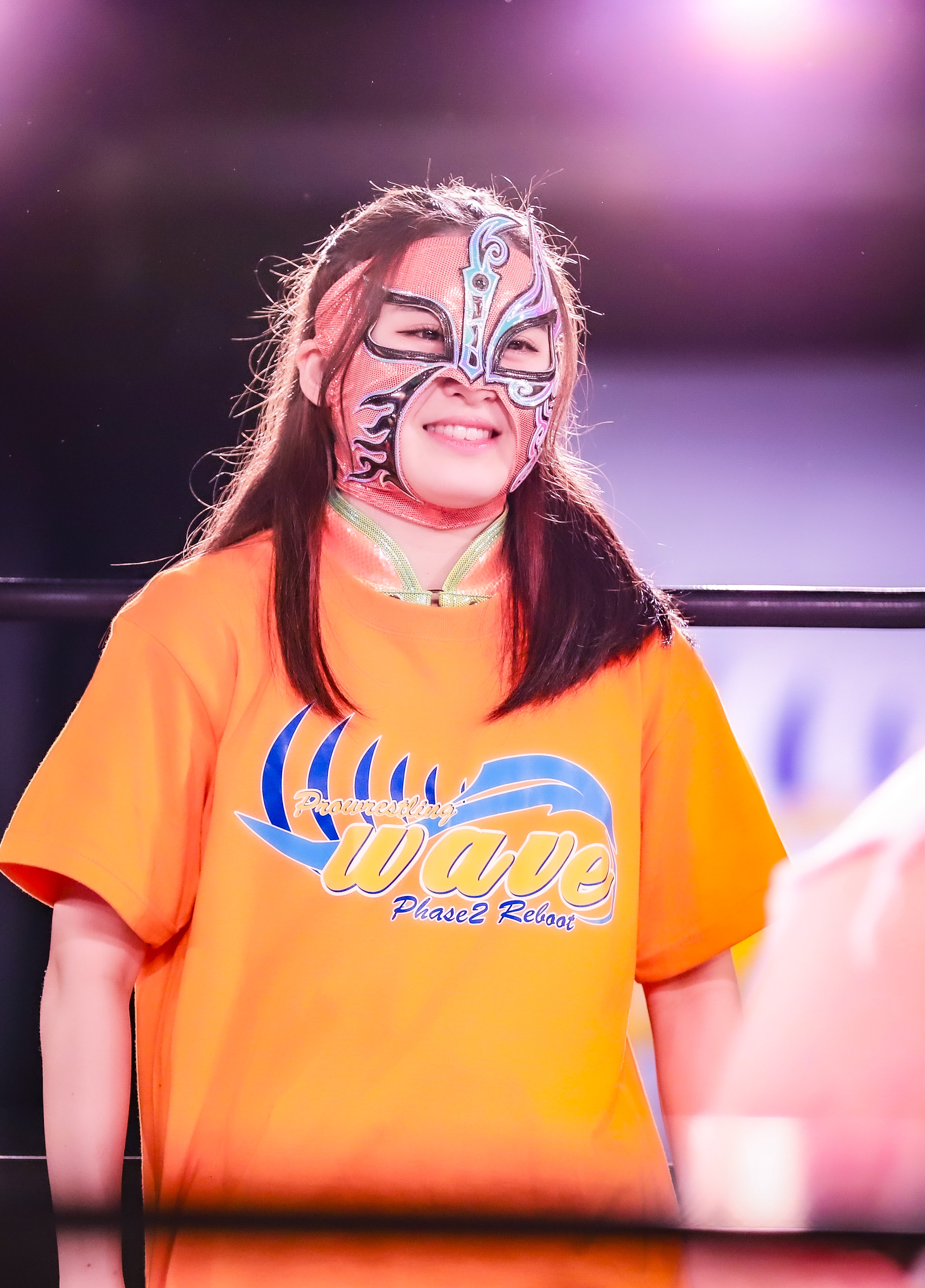
- Honoka in April 2023

Personal information
- Born: 26 January 2005 (age 21) Japan

Professional wrestling career
- Ring name: Honoka
- Billed height: 150 cm (4 ft 11 in)
- Billed weight: 50 kg (110 lb)
- Trained by: Yumi Ohka
- Debut: 2023

Honoka (炎華, Honoka) is a Japanese masked professional wrestler signed to Pro Wrestling Wave where she is a former Wave Tag Team Champion. She is also known for her tenure with World Woman Pro-Wrestling Diana and other promotions from the Japanese independent scene.

== Professional wrestling career ==
=== Pro Wrestling Wave (2023–present) ===
Honoka made her professional wrestling debut in Pro Wrestling Wave at WAVE PHASE 2 Reboot 4th ~ NAMI 1 on 2 April 2023, where she fell short to Kizuna Tanaka in singles competition.

During her tenure with the promotion, Honoka chased for various accomplishments. At WAVE Carnival Wave ~ Christmas Deluxe on 24 December 2023, she teamed up with Kizuna Tanaka to defeat Calaminence (Risa Sera and Saki) for the Wave Tag Team Championship. This was Honoka's first championship of her career. At WAVE PHASE2 Reboot 6th ~ NAMI 1 on 1 April 2025, she unsuccessfully challenged Saya Kamitani for the Wave Single Championship.

Honoka competed in Catch the Wave, the promotion's top annual tournament in which she made her debut at the 2023 edition where she placed herself in the Young Block and scoring a total of four points after going against Chie Ozora, Yura Suzuki, Himiko and Kizuna Tanaka. At the 2025 edition, she competed in the "Jupiter Block" where she wrestled Saki, Yuki Mashiro and Maika Ozaki. In the Dual Shock Wave tournament, she made her first appearance in the 2024 edition where she teamed up with Yuma Makoto and drew against Mizuki Kato and Zones in the first rounds.

==== World Wonder Ring Stardom (2023–present) ====
Honoka often competes in the New Blood branch of events promoted by World Wonder Ring Stardom as a developmental talent sent by Wave. She made her debut at New Blood 10 on 18 August 2023, where she teamed up with Hanako and Kizuna Tanaka to defeat God's Eye (Ami Sourei, Nanami) and Miran. At New Blood 16 on 19 October 2024, she teamed up with Kohaku in a losing effort against God's Eye (Hina and Tomoka Inaba). At New Blood 17 on 26 December 2024, she defeated Rian in singles competition. At New Blood 18 on 5 February 2025, she teamed up with Kohaku and Saran in a losing effort against God's Eye (Tomoka Inaba, Hina and Kiyoka Kotatsu). At New Blood 20 on 27 March 2025, she teamed up with Kohaku and Saran in a losing effort against H.A.T.E. (Saya Kamitani, Ruaka and Azusa Inaba).

Honoka made her debut in the main pay-per-view events at Stardom New Year Dream on 3 January 2025, where she teamed up with Rian in a losing effort against Mizuki Kato and Yuma Makoto.

=== World Woman Pro-Wrestling Diana (2023–present) ===
Honoka often competes in World Woman Pro-Wrestling Diana as a developmental talent. She won the 2025 edition of the Crystal Tournament by defeating Soy in the finals from 27 April, which were also disputed for the vacant World Woman Pro-Wrestling Diana#World Woman Pro-Wrestling Diana Crystal Championship.

== Championships and accomplishments ==
- Pro Wrestling Wave
  - Wave Tag Team Championship (2 times) – with Kizuna Tanaka (1) and Haruka Umesaki (1)
  - Catch the Wave (2024 Young Block)
- Pure-J
  - Princess of Pro-Wrestling Championship (1 time)
- World Woman Pro-Wrestling Diana
  - World Woman Pro-Wrestling Diana Crystal Championship (1 time)
  - Crystal Tournament (2025)
