= Dual Shock Wave =

Dual Shock Wave is an annual professional wrestling tag team tournament promoted by the Pro Wrestling Wave promotion. It has been held since 2011 and takes place between early September and mid-November. The first tournament, held in a single-elimination format, was used to determine the inaugural Wave Tag Team Champions. In 2012, the tournament was changed to a round-robin format with the winners of each block advancing to the finals. In 2014, the tournament returned to single-elimination format. Since October 2013, the name "Dual Shock Wave" has also referred to the Wave Tag Team Championship.

== List of winners ==
Year	Winner	Total won	Ref.
2011	kanAyu (Ayumi Kurihara and Kana)	1	
2012	Makkurokorosuke (Misaki Ohata and Tsukasa Fujimoto)	1	
2013	Las Aventureras (Ayako Hamada and Yuu Yamagata)	1	
2014	Revolucion Amandla (Kyoko Kimura and Tomoka Nakagawa)	1	
2015	Las Aventureras (Ayako Hamada and Yuu Yamagata)	2	
2016	GReeeeN (Dynamite Kansai and Rina Yamashita)	1	
2017	New-Tra (Rin Kadokura and Takumi Iroha)	1	
2020	Hibiki and Sareee	1	
2023	Calaminence (Risa Sera and Saki)	1	
2024	SPiCEAP (Maika Ozaki and Tae Honma)	1	
2025	SPiCEAP (Maika Ozaki and Tae Honma)	2	

== 2011 ==
The first ever Dual Shock Wave tournament was held in a single-elimination format between September 4 and October 30, 2011, and was used to determine the inaugural Wave Tag Team Champions. The pairings for each round were determined by a random draw. As the tournament featured an odd number of entrants, nine teams, one team earned a bye in the quarterfinals and one in the semifinals; these were also decided by a random draw.

Teams

- Ayako Hamada and Yumi Ohka
  (Negras Dahlia)
- Aya Yuki and Ryo Mizunami
  (Rush & Powers)
- Ayumi Kurihara and Kana
  (kanAyu)
- Cherry and Shuu Shibutani
  (Classic Gals)
- Gami and Tomoka Nakagawa
  (Yoko Hatanaka)
- Hiren and Moeka Haruhi
  (Fukyou Waon)
- Kagetsu and Sawako Shimono
  (Nadeshiko Kansai)
- Kaori Yoneyama and Kayoko Haruyama
  (Bullcats)
- Mio Shirai and Misaki Ohata
  (Plus Minus 0)

First round (September 4)
Gami; Tomoka Nakagawa	Pin
Mio Shirai; Misaki Ohata	12:47
Ayako Hamada; Yumi Ohka	Pin
Kagetsu; Sawako Shimono	18:51
Cherry; Shuu Shibutani	Pin
Ayumi Kurihara; Kana	18:51
Ran Yu-Yu; Toshie Uematsu	Pin
Kaori Yoneyama; Kayoko Haruyama	15:01
Hiren; Moeka Haruhi	Pin
Aya Yuki; Ryo Mizunami	9:40

Quarterfinals (September 14)
Gami; Tomoka Nakagawa	Pin
Ayako Hamada; Yumi Ohka	22:08
Ayumi Kurihara; Kana
Bye
Ran Yu-Yu; Toshie Uematsu	Pin
Aya Yuki; Ryo Mizunami	15:29
N/A
N/A

Semifinals (September 26)
Gami; Tomoka Nakagawa	Pin
Ayumi Kurihara; Kana	25:18
Ran Yu-Yu; Toshie Uematsu
Bye

Finals (October 30)
Ayumi Kurihara; Kana	Pin
Ran Yu-Yu; Toshie Uematsu	23:03

== 2012 ==
The second Dual Shock Wave tournament was held between September 25 and November 16, 2012. The tournament was contested in a round-robin format with two blocks of four teams, where a win was worth two points, a draw one point and a loss zero points. As the reigning Wave Tag Team Champions, Gami and Tomoka Nakagawa earned an automatic spot in the tournament. As the reigning Dual Shock Wave winners, both Ayumi Kurihara, now teaming with Mika Iida, and Kana, now teaming with Ayako Hamada, also earned automatic spots in the tournament. Three of the teams, Hikaru Shida and Yumi Ohka, Misaki Ohata and Tsukasa Fujimoto, and Shuu Shibutani and Syuri, earned spots in the tournament by scoring eliminations in a five tag team elimination match on September 3, 2012, which also included the teams of Aya Yuki and Sawako Shimono, and Maki Narumiya and Yuu Yamagata. Narumiya and Yamagata were named the reserve team of Block A and Yuki and Shimono the reserve team of Block B, where they would enter the tournament in case of an injury, inheriting the points of the eliminated team. The final two teams of Apple Miyuki and Kyusei Ninja Ranmaru, and Makoto and Moeka Haruhi were so-called "producer recommendation" picks made by Gami. The winners of the tournament, if not Gami and Tomoka Nakagawa, would earn a shot at the Wave Tag Team Championship on November 27 at Korakuen Hall.

Final standings
A		B	
Wrestlers	Score	Wrestlers	Score
Misaki Ohata and Tsukasa Fujimoto (Makkurokorosuke)	5	Shuu Shibutani and Syuri (Kiseki no Rinjin)	4
Ayako Hamada and Kana (Senritsu no Joou)	4	Hikaru Shida and Yumi Ohka (Shidarezakura)	4
Apple Miyuki and Kyusei Ninja Ranmaru (Naniwa☆Bonjo Venus)	2	Makoto and Moeka Haruhi (1st Impact)	2
Gami and Tomoka Nakagawa (Yoko Hatanaka)	1	Ayumi Kurihara and Mika Iida (Kurigohan)	2

A	Miyuki Ranmaru	Hamada Kana	Gami Nakagawa	Ohata Fujimoto
Miyuki Ranmaru	X	Hamada; Kana (16:19)	Miyuki; Ranmaru (12:45)	Ohata; Fujimoto (12:08)
Hamada Kana	Hamada; Kana (16:19)	X	Draw (20:00)	Draw (19:16)
Gami Nakagawa	Miyuki; Ranmaru (12:45)	Draw (20:00)	X	Ohata; Fujimoto (18:09)
Ohata Fujimoto	Ohata; Fujimoto (12:08)	Draw (19:16)	Ohata; Fujimoto (18:09)	X
B	Kurihara Iida	Shida Ohka	Makoto Haruhi	Shibutani Syuri
Kurihara Iida	X	Shida; Ohka (14:54)	Makoto; Haruhi (14:09)	Kurihara; Iida (15:51)
Shida Ohka	Shida; Ohka (14:54)	X	Shida; Ohka (18:23)	Shibutani; Syuri (9:51)
Makoto Haruhi	Makoto; Haruhi (14:09)	Shida; Ohka (18:23)	X	Shibutani; Syuri (12:59)
Shibutani Syuri	Kurihara; Iida (15:51)	Shibutani; Syuri (9:51)	Shibutani; Syuri (12:59)	X

Block B Playoff Match (November 16)			Finals (November 16)
			A1	Ohata and Fujimoto	Pin
			B1	Shibutani and Syuri	19:27
B1	Shida and Ohka	Pin	B1	Shibutani and Syuri	19:27
B1	Shibutani and Syuri	10:35

== 2013 ==
The 2013 Dual Shock Wave took place between September 1 and October 6. The winners of the tournament earned a shot at the Wave Tag Team Championship on October 30. Had the defending champions, Cherry and Shuu Shibutani, won the tournament, the title shot would have gone to the other finalist. The tournament was contested in a single round-robin block with eight participating teams. Hamuko Hoshi, Hikaru Shida and Tsukasa Fujimoto from Ice Ribbon entered the tournament as outsiders. In the tournament a win was worth one point, while both a draw and a loss were worth zero points. If a team drew or lost three times, they were eliminated from the tournament. The final match was a three-way match contested under "Dog Fight" rules, where only two teams were in the ring at the same time and after a pinfall or submission the losing team would switch places with the team not taking part in the match. The first team to pick up two consecutive pinfalls or submissions would be declared the winner.

Final standings
Wrestlers	Score	Matches
Ayako Hamada and Yuu Yamagata (Las Aventureras)	4	6
Hikaru Shida and Tsukasa Fujimoto (Muscle Venus)	4	6
Kana and Yumi Ohka (Giann's)	4	6
Gami and Ryo Mizunami (Megane Super)	2	5
Moeka Haruhi and Tomoka Nakagawa (Higebu)	2	5
Hamuko Hoshi and Sawako Shimono (HamukoSawako)	1	4
Cherry and Shuu Shibutani (Classic Gals)	1	4
Mio Shirai and Misaki Ohata (Plus Minus Zero 2013)	1	4

Results	Hamada Yamagata	Cherry Shibutani	Gami Mizunami	Hoshi Shimono	Shida Fujimoto	Kana Ohka	Shirai Ohata	Haruhi Nakagawa
Hamada Yamagata	X	Hamada; Yamagata (11:59)	Gami; Mizunami (15:06)	Hamada; Yamagata (13:26)	Hamada; Yamagata (10:13)	Kana; Ohka (19:57)	X	Hamada; Yamagata (13:30)
Cherry Shibutani	Hamada; Yamagata (11:59)	X	X	X	Shida; Fujimoto (9:46)	Kana; Ohka (13:54)	X	Cherry; Shibutani (12:15)
Gami Mizunami	Gami; Mizunami (15:06)	X	X	Gami; Mizunami (12:11)	Shida; Fujimoto (15:36)	Draw (20:00)	Shirai; Ohata (12:21)	X
Hoshi Shimono	Hamada; Yamagata (13:26)	X	Gami; Mizunami (12:11)	X	Hoshi; Shimono (13:56)	Kana; Ohka (17:21)	X	X
Shida Fujimoto	Hamada; Yamagata (10:13)	Shida; Fujimoto (9:46)	Shida; Fujimoto (15:36)	Hoshi; Shimono (13:56)	X	X	Shida; Fujimoto (11:27)	Shida; Fujimoto (10:59)
Kana Ohka	Kana; Ohka (19:57)	Kana; Ohka (13:54)	Draw (20:00)	Kana; Ohka (17:21)	X	X	Kana; Ohka (14:51)	Haruhi; Nakagawa (13:48)
Shirai Ohata	X	X	Shirai; Ohata (12:21)	X	Shida; Fujimoto (11:27)	Kana; Ohka (14:51)	X	Haruhi; Nakagawa (8:30)
Haruhi Nakagawa	Hamada; Yamagata (13:30)	Cherry; Shibutani (12:15)	X	X	Shida; Fujimoto (10:59)	Haruhi; Nakagawa (13:48)	Haruhi; Nakagawa (8:30)	X

- October 6:
  - Three-way Dog Fight final match: Las Aventureras (Ayako Hamada and Yuu Yamagata) defeated Giann's (Kana and Yumi Ohka) and Muscle Venus (Hikaru Shida and Tsukasa Fujimoto).
    - Las Aventureras defeated Giann's (5:44).
    - Muscle Venus defeated Las Aventureras (7:57).
    - Giann's defeated Muscle Venus (9:40).
    - Las Aventureras defeated Giann's (18:22).
    - Las Aventureras defeated Muscle Venus (24:42).

== 2014 ==
The 2014 Dual Shock Wave took place between September 23 and October 15. For the first time in three years, the tournament was contested in a single-elimination format with eleven participating teams. The first five teams taking part in the tournament were determined in advance, while Kaho Kobayashi, Sawako Shimono, Sumire Natsu and Yumi Ohka earned spots in the tournament and the right to pick their partners after picking up eliminations in an eight-way elimination match on September 7. Finally, two teams featuring outsiders were also added; one with Fairy Nipponbashi teaming with Oz Academy's Dynamite Kansai and the other with Moeka Haruhi teaming with American freelancer Melanie Cruise. Prior to the start of the tournament, the reigning Wave Tag Team Champions Sakuragohan (Kyusei Sakura Hirota and Mika Iida) were booked to defend their title against Plus Minus 2014 (Mio Shirai and Misaki Ohata) with the winners advancing directly to the finals of the tournament, while the losers would start the tournament in the first round. On September 15, Sakuragohan successfully defended the title to advance to the finals of the tournament. The final match was also contested for the Wave Tag Team Championship.

Teams

- Ayako Hamada and Yuu Yamagata
  (Las Aventureras)
- Cherry and Shuu Shibutani
  (Classic Gals)
- Dynamite Kansai and Fairy Nipponbashi
  (Fairy Family)
- Hikaru Shida and Sumire Natsu
  (Natsu Kensanba)
- Kaho Kobayashi and Kana
  (Midori☆Game)
- Kyoko Kimura and Tomoka Nakagawa
  (Revolucion Amandla)
- Kyusei Sakura Hirota and Mika Iida
  (Sakuragohan)
- Mio Shirai and Misaki Ohata
  (Plus Minus 2014)
- Melanie Cruise and Moeka Haruhi
  (Merazoma)
- Rina Yamashita and Sawako Shimono
  (Satsuma Kotsuji-gun)
- Tsukasa Fujimoto and Yumi Ohka
  (Chukan Kanrishoku)

First round

- September 23:
  - Plus Minus 2014 defeated Chukan Kanrishoku (11:08)
  - Merazoma defeated Classic Gals (11:52)
  - Revolucion Amandla and Satsuma Kotsuji-gun wrestled to a draw (15:00)
    - Tomoka Nakagawa defeated Rina Yamashita in an overtime singles match (2:08)
  - Midori☆Game defeated Natsu Kensanba (11:58)
  - Fairy Family defeated Las Aventureras (11:11)

Second round

- September 28:
  - Fairy Family defeated Midori☆Game (10:07)

Quarterfinals

- October 1:
  - Plus Minus 2014 defeated Merazoma (11:13)
  - Revolucion Amandla defeated Fairy Family (8:59)

Semifinals

- October 1:
  - Plus Minus 2014 and Revoluction Amandla wrestled to a draw (15:00)
    - Kyoko Kimura defeated Misaki Ohata in an overtime singles match (5:35)

Finals

- October 15:
  - Revolucion Amandla defeated Sakuragohan (19:41)

== 2015 ==
The 2015 Dual Shock Wave took place between October 2 and October 30. For the second year in a row, the tournament took place in a single-elimination format with seven participating teams. The winning team would also win the vacant Wave Tag Team Championship. JWP Joshi Puroresu representative Kayoko Haruyama and freelancer Tsubasa Kuragaki entered the tournament as outsiders, after gaining the "producer recommendation" spot made by Gami.

Teams

- Asuka and Yumi Ohka
  (Metamorphose)
- Ayako Hamada and Yuu Yamagata
  (Las Aventureras)
- Hikaru Shida and Melanie Cruise
  (Attack on Titan)
- Kaho Kobayashi and Rina Yamashita
  (Fafrotskies)
- Kayoko Haruyama and Tsubasa Kuragaki
  (Haru☆kura)
- Kyusei Sakura Hirota and Mika Iida
  (Motosaya Sakuragohan)
- Misaki Ohata and Ryo Mizunami
  (Avid Rival)

First round (October 2)
Misaki Ohata and Ryo Mizunami	Pin
Asuka and Yumi Ohka	15:15
Kayoko Haruyama and Tsubasa Kuragaki	Pin
Kaho Kobayashi and Rina Yamashita	15:35
Hikaru Shida and Melanie Cruise	Pin
Ayako Hamada and Yuu Yamagata	17:00

Semifinals (October 18)
Misaki Ohata and Ryo Mizunami	Pin
Kayoko Haruyama and Tsubasa Kuragaki	18:04
Ayako Hamada and Yuu Yamagata	Sub
Kyusei Sakura Hirota and Mika Iida	25:57 (Note: The match originally ended in a twenty-minute time limit draw, but was restarted as a singles match between Hamada and Iida, which Hamada won at 5:57.)

Finals (October 30)
Kayoko Haruyama and Tsubasa Kuragaki	Pin
Ayako Hamada and Yuu Yamagata	23:33

== 2016 ==
The 2016 Dual Shock Wave took place between September 22 and October 10. In the tournament, each team was made up of a veteran and a younger wrestler. The matches all had a 20-minute time limit. In case of a draw, the younger wrestlers would face each other in a singles match to determine the winner.

Teams

- Asuka and Ayako Hamada
  (World Break)
- Chihiro Hashimoto and Ryo Mizunami
  (Redbull)
- Dynamite Kansai and Rina Yamashita
  (GReeeeN)
- Fairy Nipponbashi and Kyusei Ninja Ranmaru
  (fWo)
- Hibiscus Mii and Kaho Kobayashi
  (Zettaizetsumei)
- Hikaru Shida and Yako Fujigasaki
  (Shiri Gamikyō)
- Hiroe Nagahama and Moeka Haruhi
  (Happy!)
- Kyoko Kimura and Misaki Ohata
  (Boint Afro)
- Maruko Nagasaki and Tsukasa Fujimoto
  (Inoshishīzu)
- Mika Iida and Yuki Miyazaki
  (Chōjin Shitei Konbi)
- Sawako Shimono and Yuu Yamagata
  (Daijo Thunder)
- Sumire Natsu and Yumi Ohka
  (Violet Cherry)

First round (September 22)
Dynamite Kansai; Rina Yamashita	Pin
Mika Iida; Yuki Miyazaki	16:18
Sumire Natsu; Yumi Ohka	Pin
Fairy Nipponbashi; Kyusei Ninja Ranmaru	4:31
Chihiro Hashimoto; Ryo Mizunami	Pin
Hiroe Nagahama; Moeka Haruhi	9:05
Asuka; Ayako Hamada	Pin
Sawako Shimono; Yuu Yamagata	17:22
Hibiscus Mii; Kaho Kobayashi	Pin
Hikaru Shida; Yako Fujigasaki	11:38
Maruko Nagasaki; Tsukasa Fujimoto	Pin
Kyoko Kimura; Misaki Ohata	13:29

Second round (September 22, 25)
Dynamite Kansai; Rina Yamashita	Pin
Fairy Nipponbashi; Kyusei Ninja Ranmaru	10:55
Chihiro Hashimoto; Ryo Mizunami	Pin
Sawako Shimono; Yuu Yamagata	16:27
Hibiscus Mii; Kaho Kobayashi	Pin
Kyoko Kimura; Misaki Ohata

Semifinals (October 2)
Dynamite Kansai; Rina Yamashita
Bye
Chihiro Hashimoto; Ryo Mizunami	Pin
Hibiscus Mii; Kaho Kobayashi	22:18 (Note: The match originally ended in a twenty-minute time limit draw, but was restarted as a singles match between Hashimoto and Kobayashi, which Hashimoto won at 2:18.)

Finals (October 10)
Dynamite Kansai; Rina Yamashita	Pin
Chihiro Hashimoto; Ryo Mizunami	18:21

== 2017 ==
The 2017 Dual Shock Wave took place on September 17. The tournament featured nine teams, seeded from number one to nine. The tournament would start with the number one seed taking on the number two seed with the winner advancing to face the number three seed and so on until all teams have wrestled at least once. Hiroe Nagahama and Kaho Kobayashi, the team seeded ninth, would defend the Wave Tag Team Championship in the final match of the tournament. Each match in the tournament would also feature special rules, determined by a random draw.

Results

- 1. Natsu & Natsuri (Natsumi Maki and Sumire Natsu)
- 2. Pyonzu, Zu (Kyusei Sakura Hirota and Saki)
  - Natsu & Natsuri defeated Pyonzu, Zu in a TLC match (2:07)
- 3. Kuso Onna Night (Nagisa Nozaki and Yuki Miyazaki)
  - Natsu & Natsuri and Kuso Onna Night wrestled to a time limit draw in a lumberjack match (5:00); both teams eliminated
- 4. Gokigen BBA (Cherry and Kaori Yoneyama)
- 5. So on Flower (Aoi Kizuki and Moeka Haruhi)
  - Gokigen BBA and So on Flower wrestled to a draw via double pinfall in a two-count match (4:22); both teams eliminated
- 6. Boss to Mammy (Mio Momono and Yumi Ohka)
- 7. Avid Rival (Misaki Ohata and Ryo Mizunami)
  - Boss to Mammy and Avid Rival wrestled to a time limit draw in a slow motion rules match (5:00)
  - Boss to Mammy defeated Avid Rival in a sudden death one-count match (1:10)
- 8. New-Tra (Rin Kadokura and Takumi Iroha)
  - New-Tra defeated Boss to Mammy in a submissions only match (5:50)
- 9. Big Rice Field (Hiroe Nagahama and Kaho Kobayashi)
  - New-Tra defeated Big Rice Field (18:08)

== 2020 ==
The 2020 edition of the tournament took place between November 1 and November 21, 2020. The signature match gimmick of the tournament were the three-way tag team matches instead of the classic two-on-two tag team matches.

=== Matches ===
Night 1 (November 1)
No.	Results	Stipulations
1	Luminous (Haruka Umesaki and Miyuki Takase) defeated Ami Miura and Yuu	Tag team match
2	Rin Kadokura defeated Itsuki Aoki	Singles match
3	Ayako Sato and Sareee defeated Sakura Hirota and Yuki Miyazaki	Tag team match
4	Rina Shingaki and Ayame Sasamura defeated Nagisa Nozaki and Saki, and Boss To Mammy (Yumi Oka and Mio Momono)	Dual Shock Wave first round match

Night 2 (November 7)
No.	Results	Stipulations
1	Nagisa Nozaki and Saki defeated Sakura Hirota and Yuki Miyazaki	Tag team match
2	Mio Momono defeated Maylee	Singles match
3	Fairy Nipponbashi defeated Yumi Ohka	Singles match
4	Itsuki Aoki and Rin Kadokura defeated Rina Shingaki and Ayame Sasamura, and Luminous (Haruka Umesaki and Miyuki Takase)	Dual Shock Wave first round match

Night 3 (November 21)
No.	Results	Stipulations
1	Ayame Sasamura defeated Ayako Sato, Haruka Umesaki, Miyuki Takase and Saki	Five-way elimination match
2	Nagisa Nozaki (c) defeated Rina Shingaki	Singles match for the Wave Single Championship
3	Cherry and Fairy Nihonbashi defeated Sakura Hirota and Yuki Miyazaki	Tag team match
4	Hibiki and Sareee defeated Boss To Mammy (Mio Momono and Yumi Ohka) and Itsuki Aoki and Rin Kadokura	Dual Shock Wave final match
(c) / – the champion(s) heading into the match

== 2023 ==
The 2023 edition of the tournament took place between November 1 and December 1. The final match was also disputed for the Wave Tag Team Championship.

Round 1
Risa Sera and Saki	Pin
Haruka Umesaki and Nanami	12:53
Kakeru Sekiguchi and Miyuki Takase	11:47
Hagane Shinnou and Kaori Yoneyama	Pin

Round 2
Risa Sera and Saki	Pin
Kizuna Tanaka and ChiChi	19:58
Itsuki Aoki and Ikuto Hidaka	Pin
Hagane Shinnou and Kaori Yoneyama

Finals
Risa Sera and Saki	Pin
Itsuki Aoki and Ikuto Hidaka	15:41

== 2024 ==
The 2024 edition of the tournament took place between September 1 and October 1.

Night 1 (September 1)
No.	Results	Stipulations	Times
1	Honoka and Yuma Makoto vs. Mizuki Kato and Zones ended in a time-limit draw	Dual Shock Wave first round match	10:00
2	SPiCEAP (Maika Ozaki and Tae Honma) defeated Haruka Umesaki and Nanami	Dual Shock Wave first round match	9:19
3	Kohaku and Tomoko Watanabe defeated Hiragi Kurumi and Mochi Natsumi	Dual Shock Wave first round match	8:59
4	Aya Sakura and Sakura Hirota vs. Saran and Yumi Ohka ended in a time-limit draw	Dual Shock Wave first round match	10:00
5	Itsuki Aoki and Kakeru Sekiguchi vs. Natsu Sumire and Riara ended in a time-limit draw	Dual Shock Wave first round match	10:00

Night 2 (September 14)
No.	Results	Stipulations	Times
1	Itsuki Aoki and Kakeru Sekiguchi defeated Honoka and Yuma Makoto	Dual Shock Wave second round match	13:52
2	SPiCEAP (Maika Ozaki and Tae Honma) defeated Natsu Sumire and Riara	Dual Shock Wave second round match	14:20

Night 3 (September 18)
No.	Results	Stipulations	Times
1	Kohaku and Tomoko Watanabe defeated Saran and Yumi Ohka	Dual Shock Wave second round match	13:36
2	Itsuki Aoki and Kakeru Sekiguchi defeated Natsu Sumire and Riara	Dual Shock Wave semifinal match	16:14

Night 4 (September 22)
No.	Results	Stipulations	Times
1	SPiCEAP (Maika Ozaki and Tae Honma) defeated Kohaku and Tomoko Watanabe	Dual Shock Wave semifinal match	13:37

Night 5 (October 1)
No.	Results	Stipulations	Times
1	SPiCEAP (Maika Ozaki and Tae Honma) defeated Itsuki Aoki and Kakeru Sekiguchi	Dual Shock Wave final	17:28

== 2025 ==
Quarterfinals
Rina Amikura and Yuko Sakurai	Pin
Kohaku and Momoka Hanazono	13:34
Life Thirty-One (Saran and Yumi Ohka)	18:57
Tropikawild (Saki and Yuna Mizumori)	Pin
Risa Sera and Yuki Miyazaki	Pin
Natsu Sumire and Yuuri	13:09
Cherry and Kaori Yoneyama	10:25
Itsuki Aoki and Kakeru Sekiguchi	Pin

Semifinals
None (Note: the team of Amikura and Sakurai had failed to challenge for the Wave Tag Team Championship)	Bye
Tropikawild (Saki and Yuna Mizumori)	N/A
Risa Sera and Yuki Miyazaki	Pin
Itsuki Aoki and Kakeru Sekiguchi	15:54

Finals
Tropikawild (Saki and Yuna Mizumori)	19:11
SPiCEAP (Maika Ozaki and Tae Honma)	Pin

== See also ==
- Catch the Wave
- Pro Wrestling Wave
- Goddesses of Stardom Tag League
