= Pro Wrestling Wave =

Japanese women's professional wrestling promotion

- Acronym: Wave
- Founded: August 2007
- Style: Joshi puroresu
- Headquarters: Nakano, Tokyo, Japan
- Founder(s): Gami (booker); Yumi Ohka; Tatsuya Takeshi (president)
- Owner(s): Zabun Co., Ltd.
- Sister: Osaka Joshi Pro-Wrestling
- Predecessor: JDStar

Pro Wrestling Wave (プロレスリングwave, Puroresuringu Wēbu) is a women's professional wrestling, or Joshi Puroresu, promotion created in 2007 after the dissolution and closure of JDStar. The company was formed by Mikiko Futagami, or Gami, former JDStar wrestler Yumi Ohka, and former JDStar booker Tatsuya Takeshi, who assumed the role of President for the new company. The company has had a very slow growth and grassroots rise, and is one of the few women's promotions in Japan to do shows on weekdays.

2010 was the biggest year for Wave, which saw them run Tokyo's Korakuen Hall for the first time, along with their first television broadcast by Samurai! TV, which was also a first. Prior to the show, Wave's shows were (and still are) primarily sold as DVDs.

Gami wrestled her retirement match on December 30, 2013, but remains with the promotion behind the scenes, running it through Zabun, Co., Ltd.

On May 3, 2016, Wave announced it was launching its own internet streaming site, Wave Network, the following month.

== Roster ==
=== Wrestlers ===
Ring name	Real name	Notes
Chie Ozora	Chiemi Shioya	Signed to Pure-J
Kaho Kobayashi	Kaho Kobayashi	Freelancer; Wave Tag Team Champion
Cohaku	Unknown	
Haruka Umesaki	Unknown	Signed to World Woman Pro-Wrestling Diana; Regina Di Wave Champion
Hikari Shimizu	Unknown	Freelancer
Hiragi Kurumi	Hiragi Kurumi	Freelancer
Honoka	Unknown	
Itsuki Aoki	Aika Aoki	Freelancer
Maika Ozaki	Maika Ozaki	Freelancer
Mio Momono	Unknown	Signed to Marvelous That's Women Pro Wrestling
Miyuki Takase	Unknown	Signed to Sendai Girls' Pro Wrestling
Mochi Natsumi	Unknown	Freelancer
Nagisa Nozaki	Nagisa Nozaki	Freelancer
Ranmaru	Unknown	Freelancer
Rina Amikura	Unknown	
Saki	Saki Watanabe	Freelancer
Sakura Hirota	Sakura Hirota	Freelancer
Saran	Unknown	
Saya Kamitani	Saya Kamitani	Signed to World Wonder Ring Stardom
Tomoka Inaba	Unknown	Signed to JTO
Veny	Unknown	Freelancer
Yuki Miyazaki	Yuki Miyazaki	
Yuko Sakurai	Unknown	Freelancer
Yumi Ohka	Yumiko Abe	

=== Staff ===
- Atsushi Ishiguro (referee)
- Michiko Nonaka (Announcer)
- Kiri Yoshino (Announcer)
- Mikiko Futagami (executive producer)
- Toshie Uematsu (trainer)

== Notable alumni ==
=== Female ===
- Akane Fujita
- Akari
- Aoi Kizuki
- Arisa Nakajima
- Asami Kawasaki
- Asuka
- Aya Yuki
- Ayako Hamada
- Ayako Sato
- Ayame Sasamura
- Ayumi Kurihara
- Bullfight Sora
- Cherry
- Chihiro Hashimoto
- Chikayo Nagashima
- Crea
- Dash Chisako
- Dynamite Kansai
- Fairy Nipponbashi
- Gami
- Hanako Nakamori
- Hibiki
- Hibiscus Mii
- Hikaru Shida
- Hiroe Nagahama
- Kagetsu
- Kana
- Kaho Kobayashi
- Kaori Yoneyama
- Kaoru Ito
- Kaoru Maeda
- Kayoko Haruyama
- Kazuki
- Kizuna Tanaka
- Kyoko Kimura
- Makoto
- Maika Ozaki
- Maria
- Maruko Nagasaki
- Matsuya Uno
- Mei Hoshizuki
- Melanie Cruise
- Mika Iida
- Mio Shirai
- Misa Kagura
- Misa Matsui
- Misaki Ohata
- Moeka Haruhi
- Momo Tani
- Nao Komatsu
- Natsumi Maki
- Rabbit Miu
- Ran Yu-Yu
- Riara
- Riko Kawahata
- Rina Amikura
- Rina Shingaki
- Risa Sera
- Ryo Mizunami
- Sae
- Saki
- Sawako Shimono
- Sareee
- Sayaka Obihiro
- Senri Kuroki
- Shiori Akiba
- Shizuku Tsukata
- Shuu Shibutani
- Sumire Natsu
- Suzu Suzuki
- Syuri
- Tae Honma
- Takumi Iroha
- Tomoka Nakagawa
- Tomoko Watanabe
- Totoro Satsuki
- Tsubasa Kuragaki
- Tsukasa Fujimoto
- Waka Tsukiyama
- Yako Fujigasaki
- Yappy
- Yuko Sakurai
- Yurika Oka
- Yuu Yamagata

=== Male ===
- Isami Kodaka
- Takato Nakano
- Tank Nagai
- Yuko Miyamoto

== Championships ==
As of November 21, 2026

Championship	Current champion(s)	Reign	Date won	Days held	Location	Notes
Wave Single Championship	Haruka Umesaki	1	August 15, 2026	98+	Tokyo, Japan	Defeated Itsuki Aoki at WAVE Yumi Ohka 25th Anniversary.
Wave Tag Team Championship	Kids Club (Kohaku and Momoka Hanazono)	2 (2, 2)	November 15, 2026	6+	Tokyo, Japan	Defeated Team Natsuba (Natsu Sumire and Yuuri) at WAVE Sapporo Wave ~ NA MA RA Kingdom.

=== Other promoted ===
Championship	Current champion(s)	Reign	Date won	Days held	Defenses	Location	Notes
World Woman Pro-Wrestling Diana World Championship	Haruka Umesaki	1	April 29, 2023	1,302+	1	Tokyo, Japan	Defeated Ayako Sato at Diana.

== Annual tournaments ==
Tournament	Last winner	Last held	Type	Created	Notes
Catch the Wave	Miyuki Takase	July 1, 2021	Openweight	2009	An annual round-robin tournament held from early-May to early mid-July.
Dual Shock Wave	Sareee and Hibiki	2020	Tag team	2011	An annual tournament held from September to October. Originally a single-elimination tournament, in 2012 changed to round-robin format.
One Day 6-Person Tag Tournament	Kuros (Mio Shirai, Misaki Ohata and Tsukasa Fujimoto)	November 26, 2014	Six-woman tag team	2013	An annual single-elimination tournament held in November.
Zan-1	Mika Iida	December 29, 2017	Openweight	2012	An annual tournament, which includes a battle royal, rock-paper-scissors tournament and a fan vote, to determine the number one contender to the Wave Single Championship.
