= Yuu Yamagata =

Japanese professional wrestler

Personal information
- Born: July 6, 1976 (age 50) Tomakomai, Japan

Professional wrestling career
- Ring name(s): Miss Yuu X Yuu Yamagata
- Billed height: 164 cm (5 ft 5 in)
- Billed weight: 62 kg (137 lb)
- Trained by: Taka Michinoku; Mariko Yoshida
- Debut: 2000

Yuko Yamagata (山縣優子, Yamagata Yūko) better known by her ring name Yuu Yamagata (山縣優, Yamagata Yuu) is a Japanese professional wrestler currently working as a freelancer and is best known for her tenure with the Japanese promotions Kaientai Dojo and Pro Wrestling Wave.

== Professional wrestling career ==
=== Independent circuit (2000-present) ===
Yamagata made her professional wrestling debut at a house show promoted by Arsion on December 3, 2000 where she fell short to her own coach Mariko Yoshida.

As a freelancer, Yamagata is known for competing in various promotions. She was in a feud with Apple Miyuki while competing in JWP Joshi Puroresu and wrestled in a series of no less than seven consecutive matches against her which she won, starting with July 31, 2002. On the third night of the 2011 edition of World Wonder Ring Stardom's Goddesses of Stardom Tag League, she teamed up with Nanae Takahashi and Natsuki Taiyo in a losing effort to Hiroyo Matsumoto, Io Shirai and Yuzuki Aikawa. At Osaka Pro Saturday Night Story, an event promoted by Osaka Pro Wrestling on July 13, 2013, she teamed up with Billy Ken Kid and Kanjyuro Matsuyama in a losing effort to Ebessan, Kana and Kuishinbo Kamen as a result of a six-man tag team match. At WAVE/OZ Academy OZABU Spin Off, a cross-over event produced by Wave in partnership with Oz Academy on June 7, 2015, she competed in a 19-person battle royal won by Hiroyo Matsumoto and also involving Chikayo Nagashima, Manami Toyota, Kaori Yoneyama, Kaho Kobayashi and others. At Kyoko Kimura's Retirement Show from January 22, 2017, she competed in a 20-person battle royal also involving Choun Shiryu, Mayu Iwatani, Yuko Miyamoto, Takashi Sasaki, Yuki Miyazaki, Yuu and others. At a house show promoted by Sendai Girls' Pro Wrestling on April 21, 2018, she teamed up with Heidi Katrina in a losing effort to Riot Crown (Dash Chisako and Kaoru Maeda. At Seadlinnng Go! Osaka!, Yamagata battled Sugi and Mei Hoshizuki in a three-way match. At Ice Ribbon/Hamuko Hoshi Produce from December 15, 2019 Yamagata teamed up with Tequila Saya to defeat Akane Fujita and Hibiscus Mii.

She competed briefly in the American independent scene, working for Shimmer Women Athletes and at SHIMMER Volume 53 from April 6, 2013, she wrestled in a five-way match won by Christina Von Eerie and also involving Evie, Kalamity and Rhia O'Reilly.

==== Big Japan Pro Wrestling (2009-2019) ====
Yamagata seldom competed in Big Japan Pro Wrestling as female talent. She participated in one of the longest matches in professional wrestling history, an 108-man battle royal at Tenka Sanbun no Kei: New Year's Eve Special, a cross-over event held between Big Japan Pro Wrestling (BJW), DDT and Kaientai Dojo from December 31, 2009, competing against other infamous wrestlers such as Great Kojika, Danshoku Dino, Kenny Omega, Tajiri, Gota Ihashi and many others. At BJW Osaka Surprise 34 on December 24, 2017 she teamed up with Kota Sekifuda and Tatsuhiko Yoshino in a losing effort to Speed Of Sounds (Hercules Senga and Tsutomu Oosugi) and Tsubasa.

==== Ganbare Pro Wrestling (2018-present) ====
Yamagata seldom competes for the GanPro branch of DDT Pro Wrestling. At the 2018 edition of the Ganbare Climax she got defeated by Shinichiro Tominaga in a first-round match.

==== Marvelous That's Women Pro Wrestling (2016-present) ====
Yamagata is also a part of Marvelous' roster. At a house show promoted on December 8, 2019, she teamed up with Megumi Yabushita and Tomoko Watanabe in a losing effort to Dump Matsumoto, Dash Chisako and Kaoru Maeda.

==== Pro Wrestling Wave (2012-2017) ====
At WAVE The Virgin Mary Reina De Reinas 2012, cross-over event produced by the promotion in partnership with Lucha Libre AAA Worldwide on November 27, she teamed up with Ryo Mizunami to unsuccessfully challenge Makoto and Moeka Haruhi, Hikaru Shida and Nagisa Nozaki, Aya Yuuki and Sawako Shimono, and Cherry and Shuu Shibutani in a five-way tag team match.

Yamagata is known for competing in the promotion's signature events such as the Dual Shock Wave Tournament. At the 2013 edition, she teamed up with Ayako Hamada and won the competition with a tota score of four points after facing the teams of Muscle Venus (Hikaru Shida and Tsukasa Fujimoto), Giann's (Kana and Yumi Ohka), Megane Super (Gami and Ryo Mizunami), Higebu (Moeka Haruhi and Tomoka Nakagawa), HamukoSawako (Hamuko Hoshi and Sawako Shimono), Classic Gals (Cherry and Shuu Shibutani), and Plus Minus Zero 2013 (Mio Shirai and Misaki Ohata). They also won the 2015 edition by defeating Hikaru Shida and Melanie Cruise in the first-round match, Kyusei Sakura Hirota and Mika Iida in the semi-finals and Kayoko Haruyama and Tsubasa Kuragaki in the finals.

As for the Catch the Wave tournament, she made her first appearance in the 2013 edition where she competed in the "Glamorous Block" which she won with a total of eight points after competing against Tomoka Nakagawa, Misaki Ohata, Kagetsu, Ryo Mizunami, Ayako Hamada and Gami, but later fell short to Ohata in the semi-finals.

== Championships and accomplishments ==
- Kaientai Dojo
  - Strongest-K Female League (2008)
- Professional Wrestling Just Tap Out
  - Only Give Up Tournament (2020)
  - Queen of JTO Championship (1 time)
  - JTO Girls Championship (1 time)
- Pro Wrestling Wave
  - Wave Single Championship (1 time)
  - Wave Tag Team Championship (3 times) – with Ayako Hamada
  - Dual Shock Wave (2013, 2015) – with Ayako Hamada
  - Catch the Wave Award (2 times)
    - Best Performance Award (2015) as part of the Wonderful World Fairy Family
    - Technique Award (2013)
  - Dual Shock Wave Award (1 time)
    - Technique Award (2013)
