= Wave Tag Team Championship =

Professional wrestling women's tag team championship

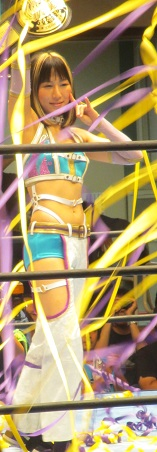
- Mio Shirai holding one of the Wave Tag Team Championship belts in August 2015

Details
- Promotion: Pro Wrestling Wave
- Date established: August 28, 2011
- Current champions: Kids Club (Kohaku and Momoka Hanazono)
- Date won: November 15, 2026
Statistics
- First champions: kanAyu (Ayumi Kurihara and Kana)
- Most reigns: As a team (3 reigns): Las Aventureras (Ayako Hamada and Yuu Yamagata); As an individual (6 reigns): Yumi Ohka
- Longest reign: Sakura Hirota and Yuki Miyazaki (629 days)
- Shortest reign: Naniwa☆Ordinary Beauty (Hibiscus Mii and Ranmaru) (<1 day)
- Oldest champion: Ikuto Hidaka (50 years, 219 days)
- Youngest champion: Saran (16 years, 254 days)
- Heaviest champion: Gami and Yuko Miyamoto (84 kg (185 lb))
- Lightest champion: Tsukasa Fujimoto (48 kg (106 lb))

The Wave Tag Team Championship is a professional wrestling tag team championship owned by the Pro Wrestling Wave promotion. The title is nicknamed and commonly referred to as the Dual Shock Wave Championship. The championship was first announced on August 28, 2011, at Wave's fourth anniversary event, and the first champions were crowned on October 30, when kanAyu (Ayumi Kurihara and Kana) defeated Uematsu☆Ran (Ran Yu-Yu and Toshie Uematsu) to win the Dual Shock Wave 2011 tournament and become the inaugural champions. From 2009 to 2010, Wave had promoted matches for the TLW World Young Women's Tag Team Championship, but this was the first title officially created and owned by the promotion. Though primarily contested for by female wrestlers, one male team, Yankii Nichokenju (Isami Kodaka and Yuko Miyamoto), has also held the title.

Like most professional wrestling championships, the title is won as a result of a scripted match. There have been a total of 45 reigns shared among 37 teams consisting of 50 different wrestlers.

== Reigns ==
kanAyu (Ayumi Kurihara and Kana) were the first champions in the title's history. Las Aventureras' (Ayako Hamada and Yuu Yamagata) third reign holds the record for the longest reign in the title's history at 282 days, while Yoko Hatanaka's (Gami and Tomoka Nakagawa) second reign holds the record for the shortest reign at 10 days. Las Aventureras (Ayako Hamada and Yuu Yamagata) hold the record for most reigns as a team, with three, while Yuki Miyazaki, Yumi Ohka and Saki share the record for most reigns individually, with five each.

== Title history ==
Key
No.	Overall reign number
Reign	Reign number for the specific team—reign numbers for the individuals are in parentheses, if different
Days	Number of days held
Defenses	Number of successful defenses
+	Current reign is changing daily

No.	Champion	Championship change			Reign statistics			Notes	Ref.
No.	Champion	Date	Event	Location	Reign	Days	Defenses	Notes	Ref.
1	kanAyu (Ayumi Kurihara and Kana)	October 30, 2011	Like a Virgin	Osaka, Japan	1	98	3	Kana and Kurihara defeated Ran Yu-Yu and Toshie Uematsu in the finals of the Dual Shock Wave 2011 tournament to become the inaugural champions.	
2	Uematsu☆Ran (Ran Yu-Yu and Toshie Uematsu)	February 5, 2012	Osaka Rhapsody Vol. 14	Osaka, Japan	1	85	1		
—	Vacated	April 30, 2012	Virgin Shock: Catch the Wave 2012 Opener	Tokyo, Japan	—	—	—	The championship was vacated when Toshie Uematsu retired from professional wrestling.	
3	Yoko Hatanaka (Gami and Tomoka Nakagawa)	June 17, 2012	Sunday Wave Vol. 10	Tokyo, Japan	1	163	2	On April 30, 2012, Gami and Nakagawa defeated Hanako Nakamori and Misaki Ohata to become the interim Wave Tag Team Champions. On June 17, they defeated Ayumi Kurihara and Kana to become the official Wave Tag Team Champions.	
4	Makkurokorosuke (Misaki Ohata and Tsukasa Fujimoto)	November 27, 2012	The Virgin Mary: Reina de Reinas 2012	Tokyo, Japan	1	145	3	This was a cross-over event produced in partnership with Lucha Libre AAA Worldwide.	
5	Triple Tails (Kana and Mio Shirai)	April 21, 2013	Sapporo Wave Na-Ma-Re	Sapporo, Hokkaido, Japan	1 (2, 1)	85	1		
6	Shidarezakura (Hikaru Shida and Yumi Ohka)	July 15, 2013	Catch the Wave 2013 Finals	Tokyo, Japan	1	31	0		
7	Yoko Hatanaka (Gami and Tomoka Nakagawa)	August 15, 2013	Summer Fiesta	Tokyo, Japan	2	10	0		
8	Classic Gals (Cherry and Shuu Shibutani)	August 25, 2013	Sunday Wave Vol. 16	Tokyo, Japan	1	66	0		
9	Las Aventureras (Ayako Hamada and Yuu Yamagata)	October 30, 2013	Virginity	Tokyo, Japan	1	270	4		
10	Yankii Nichokenju (Isami Kodaka and Yuko Miyamoto)	July 27, 2014	Weekday Wave vol–80	Tokyo, Japan	1	28	0	Kodaka and Miyamoto were the first male competitors to have ever held the championships.	
11	Sakuragohan (Mika Iida and Sakura Hirota)	August 24, 2014	Happy Anniversary Wave: Seven	Tokyo, Japan	1	52	2	This was a three-way match, also involving Las Aventureras (Ayako Hamada and Yuu Yamagata).	
12	Revolucion Amandla (Kyoko Kimura and Tomoka Nakagawa)	October 15, 2014	Catch the Wave 2014 Finale	Tokyo, Japan	1 (1, 3)	14	0	This was the finals of the 2014 Dual Shock Wave Tournament.	
13	Las Aventureras (Ayako Hamada and Yuu Yamagata)	October 29, 2014	Virgin Cord	Tokyo, Japan	2	137	3		
14	Plus Minus 2015 (Mio Shirai and Misaki Ohata)	March 15, 2015	Virgin Killer	Tokyo, Japan	1 (2, 2)	189	2		
—	Vacated	September 20, 2015	M.I.O	Tokyo, Japan	—	—	—	The championship was vacated when Mio Shirai retired from professional wrestling.	
15	Las Aventureras (Ayako Hamada and Yuu Yamagata)	October 30, 2015	RT 10–Happy Halloween Wave	Tokyo, Japan	3	282	3	Hamada and Yamagata defeated Haru☆kura (Kayoko Haruyama and Tsubasa Kuragaki) in the finals of the 2015 Dual Shock Wave tournament to win the vacant championship.	
16	Avid Rival (Misaki Ohata and Ryo Mizunami)	August 7, 2016	Sunday Wave Vol. 30: Ma.Ku.A.Ke	Tokyo, Japan	1 (3, 1)	174	2		
17	Over Sun (Yuki Miyazaki and Yumi Ohka)	January 28, 2017	Saturday Night Fever January	Tokyo, Japan	1 (1, 2)	155	4		
18	Gokigen BBA (Cherry and Kaori Yoneyama)	July 2, 2017	Be Exciting!	Tokyo, Japan	1 (2, 1)	41	0		
19	Big Rice Field (Hiroe Nagahama and Kaho Kobayashi)	August 12, 2017	10th Anniversary ~Never Ending Story~	Tokyo, Japan	1	36	1		
20	New-Tra (Rin Kadokura and Takumi Iroha)	September 17, 2017	New Chapter	Tokyo, Japan	1	132	1	This was the finals of the 2017 Dual Shock Wave Tournament.	
—	Vacated	January 27, 2018	—	Tokyo, Japan	—	—	—	The championship was vacated when Takumi Iroha suffered an injury.	
21	Fucking Woman Night☆ (Nagisa Nozaki and Yuki Miyazaki)	February 12, 2018	Valentine WAVE	Tokyo, Japan	1 (1, 2)	188	4	Miyazaki and Nozaki defeated Hiroe Nagahama and Moeka Haruhi to win the vacant championship.	
22	Boss to Mammy (Mio Momono and Yumi Ohka)	August 19, 2018	Anivarsario	Tokyo, Japan	1 (1, 3)	132	4		
23	Miracle (Sakura Hirota and Yuki Miyazaki)	December 29, 2018	Phase 1 Final ~Kick Out~ - Misaki Ohata Retirement ~Beautifully Bloom~	Tokyo, Japan	1 (2, 3)	629	3		
24	Boss to Mammy (Mio Momono and Yumi Ohka)	September 18, 2020	HIRO'e Retirement Last Longbeach	Tokyo, Japan	2 (2, 4)	120	1		
25	Aoki&Kadokura (Itsuki Aoki and Rin Kadokura)	January 16, 2021	Kabuki-cho Week Ender	Tokyo, Japan	1 (1, 2)	218	2		
26	galaxyPunch! (Hikari Shimizu and Saki)	August 22, 2021	WAVE Summer Wars 14th Summer	Tokyo, Japan	1	175	3		
27	Harassment (Sakura Hirota and Yumi Ohka)	February 13, 2022	WAVE Valentine Wave 2022	Tokyo, Japan	1 (3, 5)	28	0		
28	Luminous (Haruka Umesaki and Miyuki Takase)	March 13, 2022	WAVE Osaka Rhapsody Vol. 53	Osaka, Japan	1	19	0	This was a winner-takes-all match also for the World Woman Pro-Wrestling Diana Tag Team Championship.	
29	Brief Sisters (Hibiscus Mii and Yuki Miyazaki)	April 1, 2022	WAVE PHASE 2 Reboot 3rd ~ NAMI 1	Tokyo, Japan	1 (1, 4)	134	0		
30	galaxyPunch! (Hikari Shimizu and Saki)	August 13, 2022	WAVE 15th Anniversary ~ Carnival WAVE	Tokyo, Japan	2	211	8	Saki and Shimizu won the titles while being a sub-group of World Wonder Ring Stardom's stable of Cosmic Angels.	
31	Team Hokakudo (Ikuto Hidaka and Itsuki Aoki)	March 12, 2023	WAVE Brand New Wave	Tokyo, Japan	1 (1, 2)	264	1	Hidaka was the third ever male to win the titles.	
32	Calaminence (Risa Sera and Saki)	December 1, 2023	WAVE PHASE2 Reboot 4th ~ NAMI 1	Tokyo, Japan	1 (1, 3)	23	0		
33	Harmonie (Honoka and Kizuna Tanaka)	December 24, 2023	WAVE Carnival Wave ~ Christmas Deluxe	Kawasaki, Japan	1	42	0		
34	Calaminence (Risa Sera and Saki)	February 4, 2024	WAVE Valentine Wave 2024	Tokyo, Japan	2 (2, 4)	42	1		
35	Naniwa☆Ordinary Beauty (Hibiscus Mii and Ranmaru)	March 17, 2024	WAVE Osaka Rhapsody Vol. 60	Osaka, Japan	1 (2, 1)	<1	1		
36	Calaminence (Risa Sera and Saki)	March 17, 2024	WAVE Osaka Rhapsody Vol. 60	Osaka, Japan	3 (3, 5)	232	2		
37	SPiCEAP (Maika Ozaki and Tae Honma)	November 4, 2024	WAVE 2024 Prime WAVE	Tokyo, Japan	1	44	0		
38	Captain Armstrong (Yuki Miyazaki and Yuko Sakurai)	December 18, 2024	WAVE Dai Shiwasu ~ East 24	Tokyo, Japan	1 (5, 1)	104	1		
39	SPiCEAP (Maika Ozaki and Tae Honma)	April 1, 2025	WAVE PHASE2 Reboot 6th ~ NAMI 1	Tokyo, Japan	2	195	5		
—	Vacated	October 13, 2025	—	—	—	—	—	The championship was vacated after Tae Honma retired from professional wrestling.	
40	Life Thirty-One (Saran and Yumi Ohka)	November 2, 2025	WAVE Prime Wave 2025	Tokyo, Japan	1 (1, 6)	98	2	Defeated Azure Revolution (Maya Yukihi and Risa Sera) to win the vacant titles.	
41	Unstoppable (Hiragi Kurumi and Mochi Natsumi)	February 8, 2026	WAVE Valentine Wave	Tokyo, Japan	1	21	0		
42	Amekyun (Haruka Umesaki and Honoka)	March 1, 2026	WAVE NAMI 1	Tokyo, Japan	1 (2, 2)	19	1		
43	Kids Club (Kohaku and Momoka Hanazono)	March 20, 2026	WAVE It's Wave February	Kawasaki, Japan	1	1	0		
44	Are You Ready! (Rina Amikura and Yuko Sakurai)	March 21, 2026	WAVE Itabashi Surprise March 2026	Tokyo, Japan	1 (1, 2)	147	2		
45	Osso and Sakura (Kaho Kobayashi and Zones)	August 15, 2026	WAVE Yumi Ohka 25th Anniversary	Tokyo, Japan	1 (2, 1)	40	2		
46	Team Natsuba (Natsu Sumire and Yuuri)	September 24, 2026	WAVE Shinjuku Face Countdown Series	Tokyo, Japan	1	52	2		
47	Kids Club (Kohaku and Momoka Hanazono)	November 15, 2026	WAVE Sapporo Wave ~ NA MA RA Kingdom ~	Tokyo, Japan	2	6+	0		

== Combined reigns ==
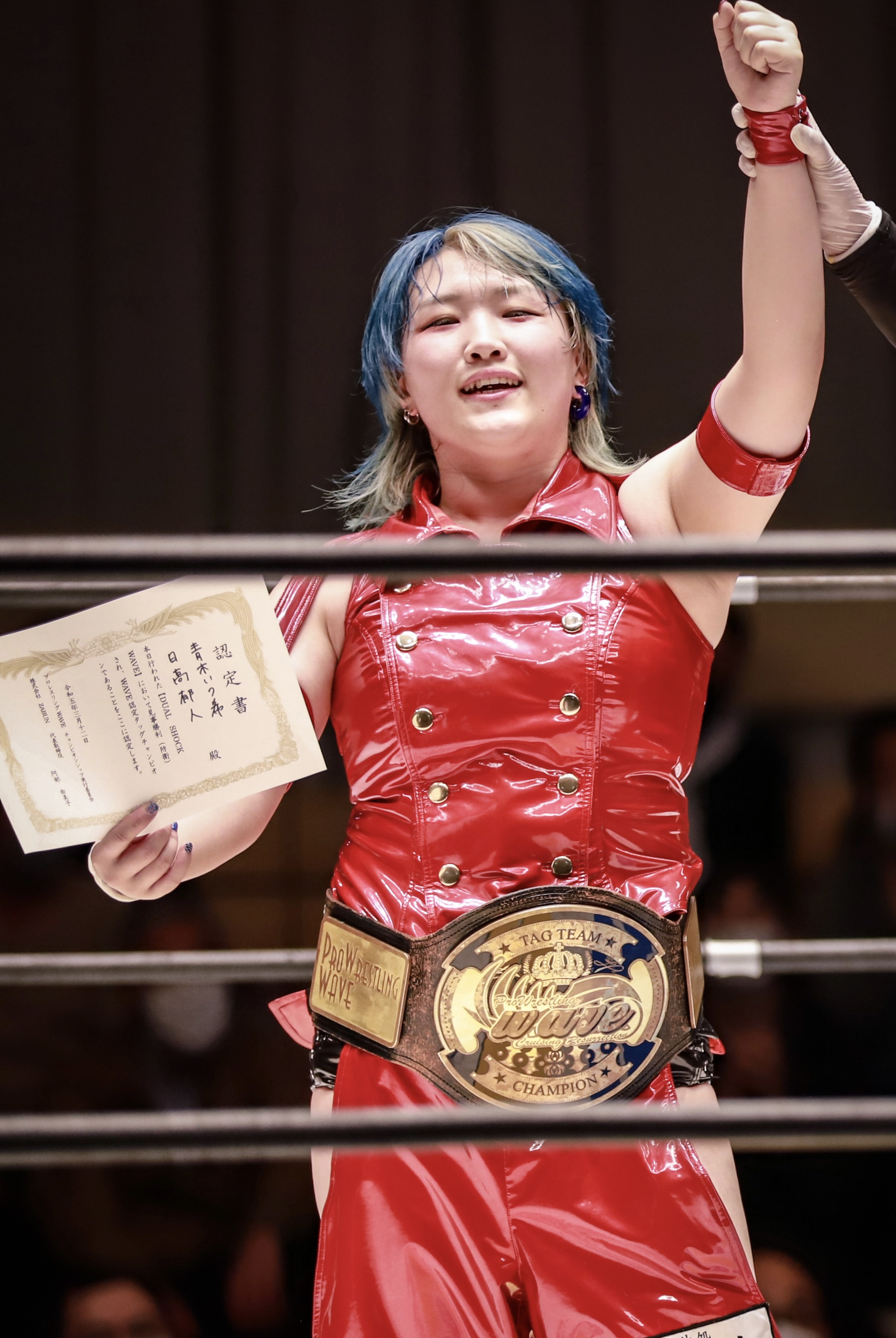
Former Itsuki Aoki shown here with one of the title belts.

As of November 21, 2026

†	Indicates the current champions

=== By team ===
Rank	Team	No. of reigns	Combined defenses	Combined days
1	Las Aventureras (Ayako Hamada and Yuu Yamagata)	3	10	689
2	Miracle (Sakura Hirota and Yuki Miyazaki)	1	3	629
3	galaxyPunch! (Hikari Shimizu and Saki)	2	11	386
4	Calaminence (Risa Sera and Saki)	3	3	298
5	Team Hokakudo (Ikuto Hidaka and Itsuki Aoki)	1	1	264
6	Boss to Mammy (Mio Momono and Yumi Ohka)	2	5	252
7	SPiCEAP (Maika Ozaki and Tae Honma)	2	5	239
8	Aoki&Kadokura (Itsuki Aoki and Rin Kadokura)	1	2	218
9	Plus Minus 2015 (Mio Shirai and Misaki Ohata)	1	2	189
10	Fucking Woman Night☆ Nagisa Nozaki and Yuki Miyazaki)	1	4	188
11	Avid Rival (Misaki Ohata and Ryo Mizunami)	1	2	174
12	Yoko Hatanaka (Gami and Tomoka Nakagawa)	2	2	173
13	Over Sun (Yuki Miyazaki and Yumi Ohka)	1	4	155
14	Are You Ready! (Rina Amikura and Yuko Sakurai)	1	2	147
15	Makkurokorosuke (Misaki Ohata and Tsukasa Fujimoto)	1	3	145
16	Brief Sisters (Hibiscus Mii and Yuki Miyazaki)	1	0	134
17	New-Tra (Rin Kadokura and Takumi Iroha)	1	1	132
18	Captain Armstrong (Yuki Miyazaki and Yuko Sakurai)	1	1	104
19	kanAyu (Ayumi Kurihara and Kana)	1	3	98
19	Life Thirty-One (Saran and Yumi Ohka)	1	2	98
21	Triple Tails (Kana and Mio Shirai)	1	1	85
21	Uematsu☆Ran (Ran Yu-Yu and Toshie Uematsu)	1	1	85
23	Classic Gals (Cherry and Shuu Shibutani)	1	0	66
24	Sakuragohan (Mika Iida and Sakura Hirota)	1	2	52
24	Team Natsuba (Natsu Sumire and Yuuri)	1	2	52
26	Harmonie (Honoka and Kizuna Tanaka)	1	0	42
27	Gokigen BBA (Cherry and Kaori Yoneyama)	1	0	41
28	Osso and Sakura (Kaho Kobayashi and Zones)	1	2	40
29	Big Rice Field (Hiroe Nagahama and Kaho Kobayashi)	1	1	36
30	Shidarezakura (Hikaru Shida and Yumi Ohka)	1	0	31
31	Yankii Nichokenju (Isami Kodaka and Yuko Miyamoto)	1	0	28
31	Harassment (Sakura Hirota and Yumi Ohka)	1	0	28
33	Unstoppable (Hiragi Kurumi and Mochi Natsumi)	1	0	21
34	Amekyun (Haruka Umesaki and Honoka)	1	1	19
34	Luminous (Haruka Umesaki and Miyuki Takase)	1	0	19
36	Revolucion Amandla (Kyoko Kimura and Tomoka Nakagawa)	1	0	14
37	Kids Club † (Kohaku and Momoka Hanazono)	2	0	7+
38	Naniwa☆Ordinary Beauty (Hibiscus Mii and Ranmaru)	1	1	<1

=== By wrestler ===
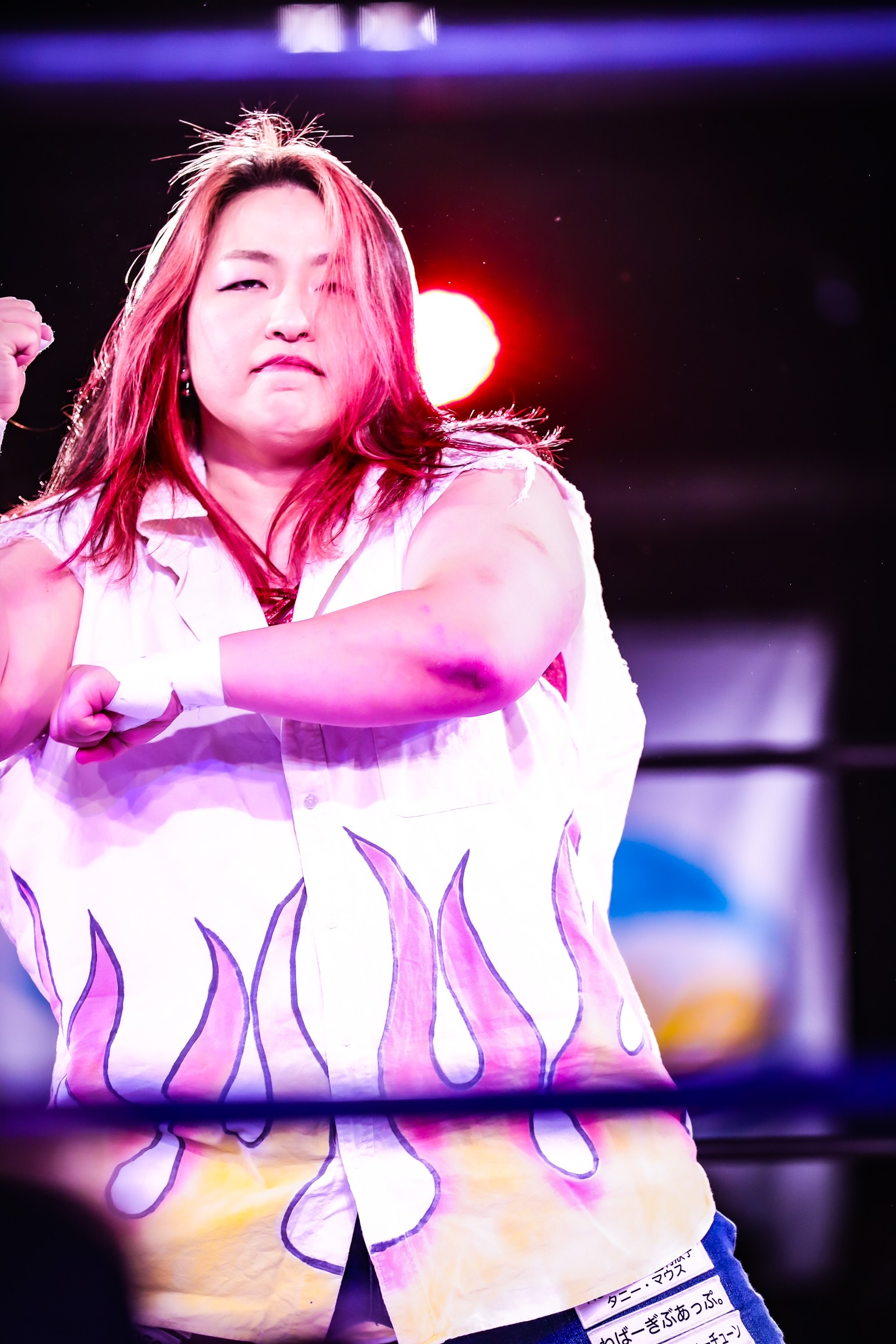
Yuki Miyazaki holds the record for the longest combined days as champion at 1,210 days.

Rank	Wrestler	No. of reigns	Combined defenses	Combined days
1	Yuki Miyazaki	5	12	1,210
2	Sakura Hirota	3	5	709
3	Ayako Hamada	3	10	689
3	Yuu Yamagata	3	10	689
5	Saki	5	14	684
6	Yumi Ohka	6	11	564
7	Misaki Ohata	3	7	508
8	Itsuki Aoki	2	3	482
9	Hikari Shimizu	2	11	386
10	Rin Kadokura	2	3	350
11	Risa Sera	3	3	298
12	Mio Shirai	2	3	274
13	Ikuto Hidaka	1	1	264
14	Mio Momono	2	5	252
15	Yuko Sakurai	2	3	251
16	Maika Ozaki	2	5	239
16	Tae Honma	2	5	239
18	Nagisa Nozaki	1	4	188
19	Tomoka Nakagawa	3	2	187
20	Kana	2	4	183
21	Ryo Mizunami	1	2	174
22	Gami	2	2	173
23	Tsukasa Fujimoto	1	3	145
24	Rina Amikura	1	2	147
25	Hibiscus Mii	2	1	133
26	Takumi Iroha	1	1	132
27	Cherry	2	0	107
28	Ayumi Kurihara	1	3	98
28	Saran	1	2	98
30	Ran Yu-Yu	1	1	85
30	Toshie Uematsu	1	1	85
32	Kaho Kobayashi	2	3	76
33	Shuu Shibutani	1	0	66
34	Honoka	2	1	61
35	Natsu Sumire	1	2	52
35	Yuuri	1	2	52
35	Mika Iida	1	2	52
38	Kizuna Tanaka	1	0	42
39	Kaori Yoneyama	1	0	41
40	Zones	1	2	40
41	Haruka Umesaki	2	1	38
42	Hiroe Nagahama	1	1	36
43	Hikaru Shida	1	0	31
44	Isami Kodaka	1	0	28
44	Yuko Miyamoto	1	0	28
46	Hiragi Kurumi	1	0	21
46	Mochi Natsumi	1	0	21
48	Miyuki Takase	1	0	19
49	Kyoko Kimura	1	0	14
50	Kohaku †	2	0	7+
50	Momoka Hanazono †	2	0	7+
52	Ranmaru	1	1	<1

== See also ==
- Goddesses of Stardom Championship
- International Ribbon Tag Team Championship
- JWP Openweight Championship
- Oz Academy Tag Team Championship
- Women's World Tag Team Championship
