= Misaki Ohata =

Japanese professional wrestler

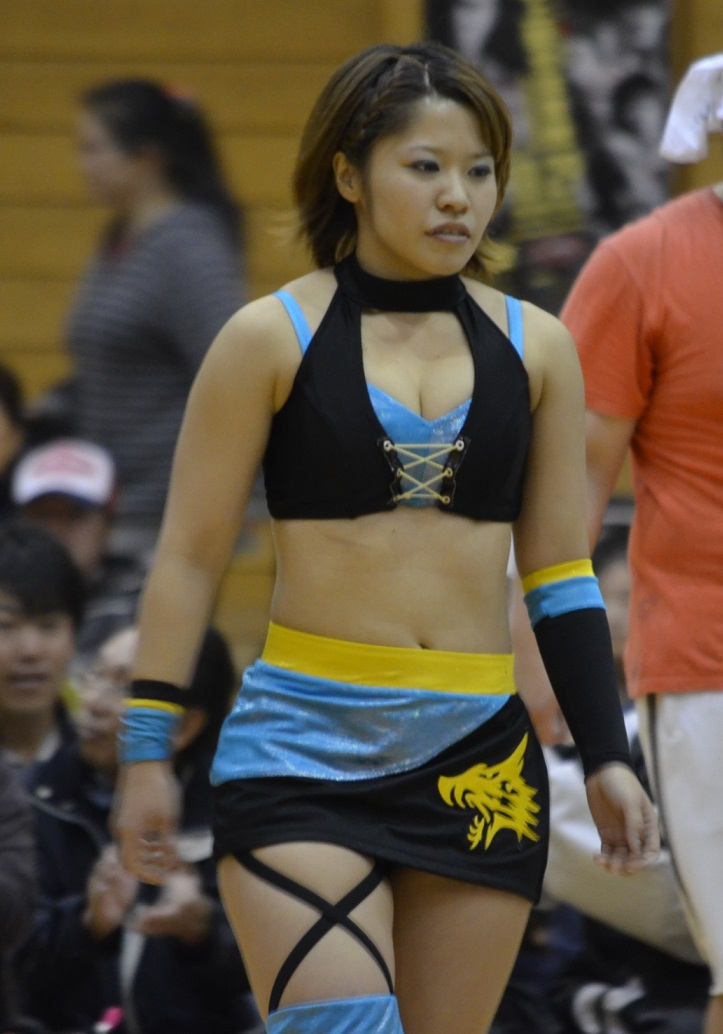
- Ohata in October 2014

Personal information
- Born: Misaki Ohata; January 5, 1989 (age 37) Sendai, Miyagi
- Spouse: Makoto Oishi (m. 2019)
- Children: 1

Professional wrestling career
- Ring name(s): Doctor Poison #3; Kuroneko; Misaki F Cup Ohka; Misaki Glico; Misaki Ohata; MI・SA・KI; Miyako Morino; Yapper Man #3
- Billed height: 1.55 m (5 ft 1 in)
- Billed weight: 54 kg (119 lb)
- Trained by: Mariko Yoshida
- Debut: December 10, 2006
- Retired: December 29, 2018

Misaki Oishi (大石 美咲, Ōishi Misaki; born January 5, 1989), better known by her maiden name Misaki Ohata (大畠 美咲, Ōhata Misaki), is a Japanese retired professional wrestler. She is best known for her work while signed to the Zabun production company and its two promotions; Pro Wrestling Wave and Osaka Joshi Pro Wrestling. She is a former one-time Wave Single Champion and a three-time Wave Tag Team Champion. She also works behind the scenes as Zabun's human resources director. She also made regular appearances for Michinoku Pro Wrestling, where she performed under a mask and the ring name Yapper Man #3 (ヤッペーマン3号, Yappēman San Gō). In the past, she has also made appearances for American promotion Shimmer Women Athletes, where she is a former Shimmer Tag Team Champion.

== Professional wrestling career ==
=== JDStar and Ibuki (2006–2010) ===
In January 2006, Ohata relocated from her hometown of Sendai to Tokyo, in order to begin training professional wrestling under Mariko Yoshida at the dojo of the JDStar promotion. On October 25, 2006, Ohata passed an audition held in front of Yoshida, JDStar owner Rossy Ogawa and booker Daisuke Kobayashi and graduated from the dojo, eventually becoming the dojo's final graduate. She made her professional wrestling debut on December 10, 2006, facing Hiroyo Matsumoto in a losing effort. Ohata's career started with a losing streak, typical for a rookie in Japanese professional wrestling, which ended on April 30, 2007, when she defeated Kaori Ohki. On June 18, JDStar, which had recently been battling financial difficulties, announced that Ohata would be transferring over to Mariko Yoshida's Ibuki promotion following the July 16 event, which would also turn out to be JDStar's final event.

In Ibuki, which had the goal of introducing the next generation of joshi stars to the world of professional wrestling, Ohata underwent further training under Yoshida alongside the likes of Hiroyo Matsumoto, Ray and Tomoka Nakagawa, while also forming the tag team Seven Star Sisters (3S) with Matsumoto. During late 2007 and early 2008, Ohata also began making appearances for various independent promotions, including Ice Ribbon, JWP Joshi Puroresu, Oz Academy, Pro Wrestling Wave and Sendai Girls' Pro Wrestling. In July 2008, Ohata represented Ibuki at the Japan Expo in France.

On May 31, 2009, Ohata defeated Dash Chisako at Ibuki #29 to become the number one contender to the JWP Junior and Princess of Pro-Wrestling Championships. Later that same day, Ohata defeated Hiroyo Matsumoto to win the titles. On July 12, Ohata made her first successful title defense, defeating Io Shirai at Ibuki #30. On November 8 at Ibuki #32, Ohata unsuccessfully challenged Emi Sakura for Ice Ribbon's ICE×60 Championship. On December 20, Ohata lost the JWP Junior and Princess of Pro-Wrestling Championships to Ryo Mizunami at a Sendai Girls' Pro Wrestling event. In early 2010, Ibuki ceased its operations, after which Ohara began working as a freelancer on the Japanese independent circuit. However, until August 2012 she remained affiliated with Ibuki's production company, S Ovation, through which she, Hiroyo Matsumoto and Tomoka Nakagawa produced their own independent events under the banner of "Joshi 4 Hope".

=== Pro Wrestling Wave (2007–2018) ===
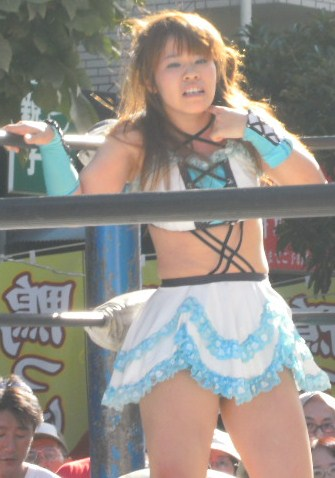
Ohata in August 2010

After only making few appearances per year for Pro Wrestling Wave since 2007, Ohata began working for the promotion more regularly in late 2009. On December 23, 2009, Ohata teamed with Moeka Haruhi to defeat Io and Mio, the Shirai sisters, for the TLW World Young Women's Tag Team Championship. They would hold the title for six months, before losing it to Bambi and Basara on July 4, 2010. Having worked her entire career as a cute babyface, January 2011 saw Ohata undergo a character overhaul, when she turned heel and came together with Bambi, Hiren and Yumi Ohka to form the Black Wave stable. On February 14, the group was renamed Black Dahlia, after the 1947 murder case, with Ohata positioned as the de facto leader. In July, Ohata made it to the finals of the Catch the Wave tournament, before losing to Kana. During the next few months, Black Dahlia was joined by Ayako Hamada, Cherry, and Hanako Nakamori, with Apple Miyuki, A★YU★MI, Kyoko Kimura, Moeka Haruhi, and Nagisa Nozaki making one-time appearances as members of the stable. On September 4, Ohata teamed with Mio Shirai in the Dual Shock Wave 2011 tournament, which was used to determine the first ever Wave Tag Team Champions, but the team, billed as "Plus Minus 0", was eliminated in their first round match by Gami and Tomoka Nakagawa. After the conclusion of the tournament, Ohata and Shirai received the first shot at the new champions, Ayumi Kurihara and Kana, but were defeated in their title match on December 11. On April 30, 2012, Ohata and Black Dahlia stablemate Hanako Nakamori were put in a match to determine the new Wave Tag Team Champions, there they were, however, defeated by the team of Gami and Tomoka Nakagawa. On May 4, Ohata entered the 2012 Catch the Wave tournament, where she wrestled in a round-robin block made up of members of Black Dahlia. After wins over Hanako Nakamori and Cherry and a loss against Tsukasa Fujimoto, Ohata was defeated by Yumi Ohka on June 17 and, as a result, failed to advance from her block. However, on July 1, Ohata defeated eleven other eliminated competitors in a battle royal to earn her way back into the semifinals of the tournament. On July 16, Ohata was eliminated from the tournament in the semifinals by Ryo Mizunami.

On July 27, Black Dahlia and rival group White Tails wrestled to a draw in a five-on-five gauntlet match, from which Ohata was eliminated after wrestling Mio Shirai to a ten-minute time limit draw. Afterwards, Ohata blamed her stablemates in the match, specifically Yumi Ohka, for Black Dahlia not winning the match, noting that they were all in their thirties. She then recruited the 24-year-old Mio Shirai to the stable; Shirai, however, announced that she would also remain a member of White Tails. The two groups then agreed that the stable which would manage to draw fewer people to their self-produced Wave event, which would take place August 7 and 8, would disband. The Black Dahlia event was headlined by an eight-woman tag team match between the stable's two generations. In the match, Ohata teamed with Apple Miyuki, Hanako Nakamori and Mio Shirai against Ohka, Ayako Hamada, Bambi and Cherry, pinning Ohka for the win after hitting her with the stable's signature whip. White Tails ended up winning the battle for attendance 201–191, forcing Black Dahlia to disband.

Ohata and Yumi Ohka faced off on August 26 at Wave's fifth anniversary event in a singles match, which was won by Ohata. Following the win, Ohata announced that she had signed with the Zabun production company, effectively making Pro Wrestling Wave her new home promotion and officially ending her freelancing days. On September 25, Ohata entered the 2012 Dual Shock Wave tournament with her handpicked partner Tsukasa Fujimoto, with the two wrestling Ayako Hamada and Kana to a draw in their opening round-robin match. After wins over Apple Miyuki and Kyusei Ninja Ranmaru and Wave Tag Team Champions Gami and Tomoka Nakagawa, Ohata and Fujimoto finished their round-robin block with five points, winning their block and advancing to the finals of the tournament. On November 16, Ohata and Fujimoto defeated Shuu Shibutani and Syuri to win the 2012 Dual Shock Wave and earn a shot at the Wave Tag Team Championship. On November 27, Ohata and Fujimoto defeated Gami and Tomoka Nakagawa to win the Wave Tag Team Championship. Ohata and Fujimoto made their first successful title defense on December 16 against 1st Impact (Makoto and Moeka Haruhi). Later that same day, Ohata earned the fourth and final spot in the upcoming Wave Single Championship tournament, after finishing two points ahead of Mio Shirai at the end of the Zan-1 tournament, a three-round tournament, which included a battle royal, a rock-paper-scissors round and a fan vote. Ohata's and Fujimoto's second successful title defense took place on December 23, when they defeated Naniwa☆Bonjo Venus (Apple Miyuki and Kyusei Ninja Ranmaru). Ohata and Fujimoto made their third successful title defense on January 4, 2013, when they wrestled Shidarezakura (Hikaru Shida and Yumi Ohka) to a thirty-minute time limit draw. On February 17, Ohata was eliminated from the Wave Single Championship tournament in her first round match by Yumi Ohka. On April 21, Ohata and Fujimoto lost the Wave Tag Team Championship to Kana and Mio Shirai in their fourth title defense.

From May 6 to June 19, Ohata took part in the round-robin portion of the 2013 Catch the Wave, finishing with a record of two wins, two draws and two losses. On June 28, Ohata defeated Kagetsu and Ryo Mizunami in a three-way playoff match to claim third place in her block and advance to the knockout stage of the tournament. On July 15, Ohata first defeated Tomoka Nakagawa in the first round, then Yuu Yamagata in the semifinals and finally JWP Joshi Puroresu representative and JWP Openweight Champion Arisa Nakajima in the finals to win the 2013 Catch the Wave. As a result of the win, Ohata became the number one contender to the Wave Single Championship, held by rival Yumi Ohka. Ohata received her title shot on August 25, but was defeated by Ohka. Also in August, Ohata was promoted to the backstage role of a human resources director within Zabun. Afterwards, Ohata reunited with Mio Shirai under the team name "Plus Minus Zero 2013" for the 2013 Dual Shock Wave. However, after the team lost three of their first four matches, they were, per pre-tournament stipulations, instantly eliminated and not allowed to finish the tournament. Despite their quick elimination, Ohata and Shirai were placed in a number one contenders match to determine who would get to challenge for the Wave Tag Team Championship after the tournament winners, and on October 30, defeated Muscle Venus (Hikaru Shida and Tsukasa Fujimoto) to earn the title shot. Ohata and Shirai received their title shot on November 9, but were defeated by the defending champions, Las Aventureras (Ayako Hamada and Yuu Yamagata).

On November 20, Ohata combined her two tag teams with Misaki Ohata and Tsukasa Fujimoto to form a trio named Kuros for a 6-Person Tag Tournament. In their first round 20-minute Point Dash match, the three defeated Meat Tech (Hiroyo Matsumoto, Ryo Mizunami and Sawako Shimono) 5–4, following a sudden death round. On November 27, Kuros defeated Classic Gohan (Cherry, Mika Iida and Shuu Shibutani) to advance to the finals of the tournament, a captain's fall match, where they were defeated by Revolucion Yoko Hatanaka (Gami, Kyoko Kimura and Tomoka Nakagawa). Following the tournament, Kuros remained together as a three-woman stable. On December 15, Ohata won her second Zan1 tournament, earning another shot at the Wave Single Championship. Ohata received her title shot on January 26, 2014, but her match with Yumi Ohka ended in a thirty-minute time limit draw. From May 11 to July 4, Ohata took part in the round-robin portion of the 2014 Catch the Wave tournament, finishing with a record of three wins, two draws and one loss, advancing to the knockout stage after a win over Mio Shirai in their final round-robin match. On July 27, Ohata first defeated Tsukasa Fujimoto in the first round and then Yumi Ohka in the semifinals to advance to the finals of the 2014 Catch the Wave, where she was defeated by Hikaru Shida. On September 15, Ohata and Mio Shirai unsuccessfully challenged Sakuragohan (Mika Iida and Kyusei Sakura Hirota) for the Wave Tag Team Championship, which also forced them to start the upcoming 2014 Dual Shock Wave from the first round. On September 23, Ohata and Shirai defeated Tsukasa Fujimoto and Yumi Ohka in the first round of the tournament. On October 1, Ohata and Shirai defeated Dynamite Kansai and Fairy Nipponbashi to advance to the semifinals of the tournament, where, later that same event, they wrestled Kyoko Kimura and Tomoka Nakagawa to a fifteen-minute time limit draw. Ohata was then defeated by Kimura in an overtime singles match and, as a result, both she and Shirai were eliminated from the tournament. On November 26, Kuros won the second annual One Day 6-Person Tag Tournament, defeating Cherry, Meari Naito and Shuu Shibutani in the finals and, as a result, earned the right to produce the December 14 Wave event. In early 2015, Ohata and Shirai received two shots at the Wave Tag Team Championship, but were both times defeated by the defending champions, Ayako Hamada and Yuu Yamagata. Finally, in the third title match between the two teams, Ohata and Shirai defeated Hamada and Yamagata on March 15 to become the new Wave Tag Team Champions. They made their first successful title defense on April 19 against Kaho Kobayashi and Tsukasa Fujimoto. On August 20, Kuros produced their final independent event, before the stable's dissolution, where Ohata, Fujimoto and Shirai defeated Chikayo Nagashima, Kayoko Haruyama and Meiko Satomura in a six-woman tag team main event. On September 13, Ohata and Shirai made their second successful defense of the Wave Tag Team Championship against Hiroyo Matsumoto and Ryo Mizunami. On September 20, Ohata and Shirai relinquished the Wave Tag Team Championship at the end of Shirai's retirement event.

Ohata then formed a new tag team named "Avid Rival" with Ryo Mizunami in an attempt to regain the Wave Tag Team Championship. They entered the 2015 Dual Shock Wave tournament, contested for the vacant title, but were defeated in the semifinals on October 18 by Kayoko Haruyama and Tsubasa Kuragaki. On December 23, Ohata and Mizunami received another shot at the title, now held by Ayako Hamada and Yuu Yamagata, but were defeated. On August 7, 2016, Ohata and Mizunami defeated Hamada and Yamagata in a rematch to become the new Wave Tag Team Champions. On October 9, Ohata and Mizunami became double tag team champions, when they defeated Hiiragi Kurumi and Tsukushi at an Ice Ribbon event for the International Ribbon Tag Team Championship. On December 29, Ohata won her third Zan1 tournament, which granted her the right to challenge for the Wave Single Championship, which had been won by her tag team partner Ryo Mizunami earlier that same day. On January 28, 2017, Ohata and Mizunami lost the Wave Tag Team Championship to Over Sun (Yuki Miyazaki and Yumi Ohka) in their third defense. Afterwards, Ohata announced that she would challenge Mizunami for the Wave Single Championship on February 11. Mizunami ended up retaining the title in the match. On March 26, 2017, Ohata and Mizunami lost the International Ribbon Tag Team Championship back to Kurumi and Tsukushi in their fourth defense. In June, Ohata made it to the finals of the 2017 Catch the Wave, before losing to Rina Yamashita.

On October 9, Ohata defeated Yamashita to win the Wave Single Championship for the first time. She lost the title to Yumi Ohka on December 29.

=== Shimmer Women Athletes (2010–2011; 2015) ===
On April 10, 2010, Ohata made her American debut for the Shimmer Women Athletes promotion, defeating Daizee Haze on Volume 29. Later that same day on Volume 30, Ohata and Jamilia Craft were defeated in a tag team match by Haze and Tomoka Nakagawa. At the following day's tapings of Volumes 31 and 32, Ohata was defeated in singles matches by Cheerleader Melissa and Sara Del Rey, respectively. Ohata returned to Shimmer five months later on September 11, defeating Portuguese Princess Ariel and losing to Nikki Roxx at the tapings of Volumes 33 and 34. The following day on Volumes 35 and 36, Ohata was defeated by Mercedes Martinez and picked up a win over Kellie Skater. On March 26, 2011, Ohata returned for her third visit with Shimmer, when she teamed with Hiroyo Matsumoto to defeat the Canadian NINJAs (Nicole Matthews and Portia Perez) for the Shimmer Tag Team Championship on Volume 37. Later that same day on Volume 38, the Seven Star Sisters successfully defended the title against the Knight Dynasty (Britani Knight and Saraya Knight). The following day, Ohata and Matsumoto successfully defended the title against Pretty Bitchin' (Nikki Roxx and Portuguese Princess Ariel) on Volume 39, before losing it to Daizee Haze and Tomoka Nakagawa on Volume 40.

Four years later, Ohata returned to Shimmer on April 11, 2015, defeating Nicole Savoy as part of Volume 72. Later that same day on Volume 73, she was defeated by Heidi Lovelace. The following day on Volume 74, Ohata teamed with Hiroyo Matsumoto, Kellie Skater and Tomoka Nakagawa in an eight-woman tag team match, where they were defeated by Aja Kong, Dynamite Kansai, Kyoko Kimura and Mayumi Ozaki. Ohata finished her weekend by defeating LuFisto later that same day on Volume 75.

=== Other independent promotions (2010–2018) ===
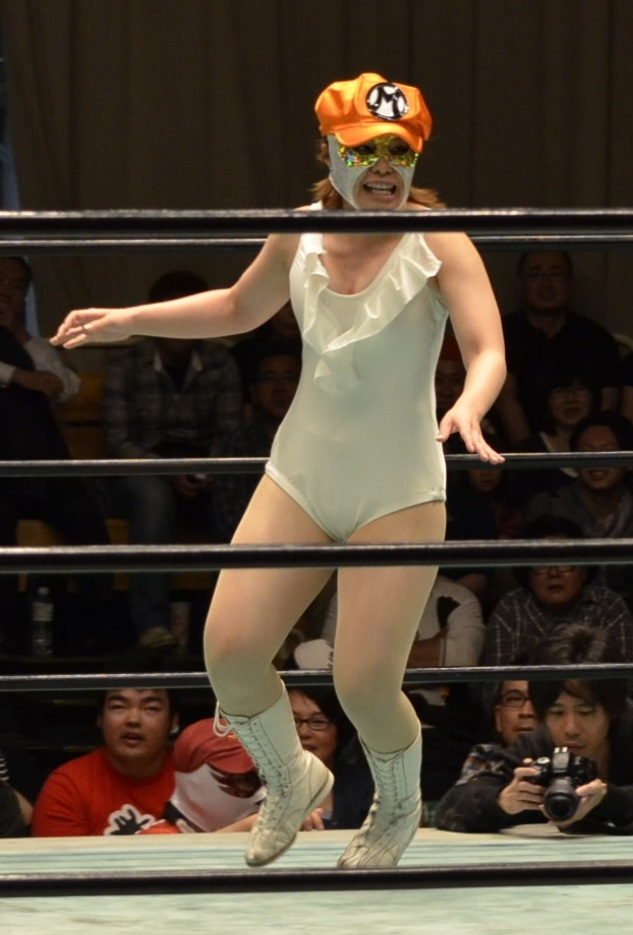
Ohata as Yapper Man #3 in June 2014

In September 2010, Ohata began working regularly for the JWP promotion, forming the Shishi no Ana stable, later renamed Labradorite, with Leon and Hanako Nakamori. On October 29, Ohata returned to Sendai Girls' Pro Wrestling under the ring name Miyako Morino (杜野 都, Morino Miyako), a play on the nickname of the city of Sendai, the "City of Trees" (杜の都, Mori no Miyako). Morino was billed as Ohata's triplet sister. On October 27, Ohata as Miayko Morino, Dash Chisako, Hiren, Kagetsu, Meiko Satomura, Ryo Mizunami and Sendai Sachiko won Sendai Girls' Joshi Puroresu Dantai Taikou Flash Tournament, where different joshi promotions battled each other. She wrestled regularly for Sendai Girls' until July 29, 2013, when she left the promotion, in storyline, to find her sister in the Galápagos Islands.

On October 7, 2011, Ohata took part in Mil Máscaras' Japanese debut's 40th anniversary event, where she unsuccessfully challenged A☆YU☆MI for the X–LAW Women's Championship. In January 2012, Ohata began working for Zabun's secondary promotion and Pro Wrestling Wave's sister promotion, Osaka Joshi Pro Wrestling, under the ring name Misaki Glico (三崎グリ子, Misaki Guriko), a character named after the local Ezaki Glico confectionery company. In June 2012, Ohata began making sporadic appearances for Michinoku Pro Wrestling under a mask and the ring name Yapper Man #3 (ヤッペーマン3号, Yappēman San Gō), the "naughty little sister" of Yapper Man #1 and Yapper Man #2. In her debut under the character on June 3, Ohata pinned the promotion's founder Great Sasuke for the win in a six-person tag team match, where the three Yapper Men faced Sasuke, Aja Kong and Jinsei Shinzaki.

On November 29, 2013, Ohata made her debut for Wrestling New Classic (WNC), teaming with Mio Shirai to defeat Makoto and Miyako Matsumoto in a tag team match.

== Personal life ==
Ohata became engaged to fellow professional wrestler Makoto Oishi on May 27, 2018. She married Oishi in January 2019. Their first child was born on 1 December 2019.

== Other media ==
Ohata has released two gravure DVDs, titled Beauty Bloom (2012) and Chocolate Kiss (チョコレートキス, Chokorēto Kisu; 2013).

== Championships and accomplishments ==
- Ice Ribbon
  - International Ribbon Tag Team Championship (1 time) – with Ryo Mizunami
- JWP Joshi Puroresu
  - JWP Junior Championship (1 time)
  - Princess of Pro-Wrestling Championship (1 time)
  - World Cosplay Championship (1 time, current)
- Michinoku Pro Wrestling
  - Momo Yutaka International Shika-Hai Cup (2014)
- Pro Wrestling Wave
  - TLW World Young Women's Tag Team Championship (1 time) – with Moeka Haruhi
  - Wave Single Championship (2 times)
  - Wave Tag Team Championship (3 times) – with Tsukasa Fujimoto (1), Mio Shirai (1) and Ryo Mizunami (1)
  - Catch the Wave (2013)
  - Dual Shock Wave (2012) – with Tsukasa Fujimoto
  - One Day 6-Person Tag Tournament (2014) – with Mio Shirai and Tsukasa Fujimoto
  - Zan1 (2012, 2013, 2016)
  - Catch the Wave Award (3 times)
    - Best Bout Award (2017) vs. Hiroe Nagahama on May 23
    - Best Bout Award (2018) vs. Hikaru Shida on March 23
    - Special Award (2018)
- Sendai Girls' Pro Wrestling
  - Joshi Puroresu Dantai Taikou Flash Tournament (2011) – with Dash Chisako, Hiren, Kagetsu, Meiko Satomura, Ryo Mizunami and Sendai Sachiko
- Shimmer Women Athletes
  - Shimmer Tag Team Championship (1 time) – with Hiroyo Matsumoto
