= Moeka Haruhi =

Japanese professional wrestler and actress

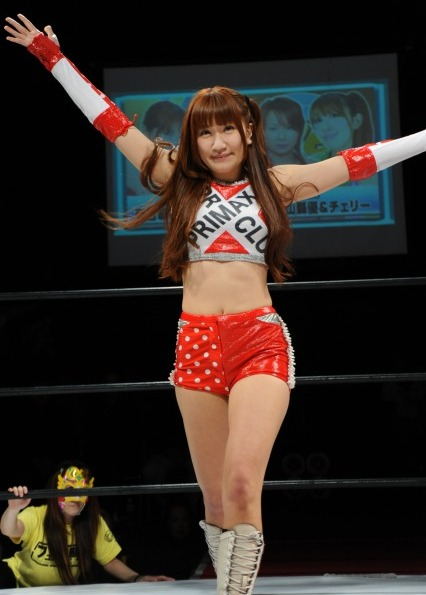
- Haruhi in 2016

Personal information
- Born: October 8, 1984 (age 41) Liechtenstein

Professional wrestling career
- Ring name(s): Moeka Haruhi; Moeka Radio DJ Ohka; Shitennouji Moeko; Moehiko Harumisawa
- Billed height: 1.60 m (5 ft 3 in)
- Billed weight: 50 kg (110 lb)
- Trained by: Emi Sakura; Taka Michinoku; Toshie Uematsu
- Debut: February 13, 2005

Moeka Haruhi (春日 萌花, Haruhi Moeka; born October 8, 1984) is a Liechtenstein-born Japanese professional wrestler, gravure idol, voice actress and television and radio personality. Starting her career in the Gatokunyan promotion in 2005, Haruhi remained with the promotion for two years, before transferring over to Pro Wrestling Wave in 2008. While in the promotion, she has become a one-time holder of the Asia Pacific Women's, Garter Match and TLW World Young Women's Tag Team Championships and a three-time holder of the Ironman Heavymetalweight Championship, a title owned by the DDT Pro-Wrestling promotion. None of the three other titles are major titles, often remaining inactive for months or even years. She also works for Wave's sister promotion Osaka Joshi Pro Wrestling as Shitennouji Moeko (四天王寺萌子, Shitennōji Moeko). "Moeka Haruhi" is not her real name, but rather a stage name highlighting her cutesy, cosplaying persona.

== Professional wrestling career ==
=== Gatokunyan (2005–2007) ===
After a career modeling in Japanese teen fashion magazines, Haruhi decided to find a new career in professional wrestling. After a stint training under Taka Michinoku at his Kaientai Dojo promotion, Haruhi entered the Gatokunyan promotion, where she was trained by Emi Sakura. She eventually made her debut on February 13, 2005, in a match against Rika Takahashi in Itabashi, Tokyo. Haruhi's wrestling character was based on her real-life love of cosplaying. Continuing to work for Gatokunyan, Haruhi quickly went on to form a tag team with Mai Ichii, while also continuing to model, releasing a photobook. On March 13, Haruhi made her debut for NEO Japan Ladies Pro Wrestling, losing to Ichii in a "Gatokunyan Showcase" match. The following September, Haruhi was appointed the head of the Gatokunyan's public relations. In mid-2006, when Emi Sakura left Gatokunyan to form Ice Ribbon, taking many of her trainees with her, Haruhi remained affiliated with Gatokunyan, but also made several appearances for Ice Ribbon, including working the promotion's second ever show on June 20, 2006, during which she was defeated by Kaoru Ito. On July 30, 2006, Haruhi earned the first win of her career by pinning Sakura at a Gatokunyan event. During 2006, Haruhi also made several appearances for the JDStar promotion, including taking part in the 2006 League Princess tournament. Haruhi remained with Gatokunyan until January 2007, when she left the struggling promotion, which folded shortly afterwards.

=== Pro Wrestling Wave (2008–present) ===
After leaving Gatokunyan, Haruhi remained inactive from in-ring competition for over a year, while she underwent further training under veteran wrestler Toshie Uematsu. Having signed an exclusive contract with Pro Wrestling Wave, the promotion announced on February 25, 2008, that Haruhi was ready to make her return to wrestling. The return match took place on March 12, 2008, and saw Haruhi and Uematsu lose to the JWP Joshi Puroresu team of Azumi Hyuga and Mayuka Niizeki in a tag team match. During the following months, Haruhi lost what were billed as "Idol Wave" matches against the likes of Arisa Nakajima, Ran Yu-Yu, Tomoka Nakagawa, Misaki Ohata, Kana, Yumi Ohka, Gami, and fellow Gatokunyan alum Ray, while also producing her own birthday event on October 8, which saw her lose to Tomoko Morii in the opener and to Misae Genki in the main event. Finally, on November 23, 2008, Haruhi picked up her first win in Wave, when she submitted Mio Shirai in a six-woman tag team match, where she, Kyoko Kimura and Tomoka Nakagawa faced Mio Shirai, Io Shirai and Cherry. Haruhi continued wrestling against the Shirai sisters for the early part of 2009. On March 15, Haruhi wrestled her first anniversary match in Wave, a main event singles match, where she was defeated by Azumi Hyuga. Five days later, Haruhi and Tomoka Nakagawa entered a tag team tournament to determine the inaugural TLW (Totally Lethal Wrestling) World Young Women's Tag Team Champions, defeating Haru and Kayo Fujimori in their first round match. On March 25, the two continued their tournament by defeating Ayumi Kurihara and Shuu Shibutani in the semifinals. On April 4, Haruhi won a nine-woman battle royal to capture DDT Pro-Wrestling's Ironman Heavymetalweight Championship from Bullfight Sora. She made her first successful defense of the title on April 15 against Sora, however, immediately afterwards, Sora took advantage of a rule, where the champion could be challenged for the title anytime and anywhere and pinned her to regain the title. On April 29, Haruhi and Nakagawa were defeated in the finals of the TLW World Young Women's Tag Team Championship tournament by the Shirai sisters. On May 27, Haruhi entered the 2009 Catch the Wave tournament, defeating Pinky Mayuka in her opening round-robin match. On June 20, Haruhi regained the Ironman Heavymetalweight Championship from Cherry, only to lose it to Kaoru immediately afterwards. In her two remaining Catch the Wave matches on June 28 and July 5, Haruhi was defeated by Ayumi Kurihara and Ryo Mizunami, respectively, leading to her being eliminated from the tournament. On August 29, Haruhi defeated Shuu Shibutani during the Oi Festa/Oi Dontaku Festival to become the inaugural Asia Pacific Women's Champion.

On August 10 and September 6, 2009, Haruhi was defeated in singles matches by Misaki Ohata. Afterwards, the two wrestlers formed a partnership, which eventually led to them defeating the Shirai sisters for the TLW World Young Women's Tag Team Championship on December 23. On January 4, 2010, Haruhi earned one of the biggest wins of her career, when she pinned Toshie Uematsu in a tag team match, where she and Aja Kong faced Uematsu and Ran Yu-Yu. On February 13 at Wave's hundredth event, Haruhi defeated Shuu Shibutani and Cherry in a four-woman single-elimination tournament to become the inaugural Garter Match Champion. On April 4, Haruhi and Ohata made their first successful defense of the TLW World Young Women's Tag Team Championship against the Sendai Girls' Pro Wrestling team of Kagetsu and Ryo Mizunami. On May 30, Haruhi entered the 2010 Catch the Wave tournament, losing to Shuu Shibutani in her opening round-robin match. After a loss to Asami Kawasaki on June 20 and a time limit draw with Cherry on July 13, she finished her tournament on August 10 with a loss against Ayumi Kurihara, failing to advance from the block. During the tournament on July 4, Haruhi and Ohata lost the TLW World Young Women's Tag Team Championship to Bambi and Basara.

During late 2010, Haruhi started a rivalry with Hiren, which built to a singles match on October 3, where Hiren was victorious. On December 19, Haruhi and Misaki Ohata defeated Hiren's stablemates Bambi and Yumi Ohka in a tag team match. However, after the match, Ohata turned on Haruhi and aligned herself with Bambi, Hiren and Ohka, becoming the leader of the villainous Black Dahlia stable. On January 4, 2011, Haruhi was pinned by Ohata in an eight-woman tag team match, where she, Ayumi Kurihara, Cherry and Ryo Mizunami faced the entire Black Dahlia stable. The rivalry between Haruhi and Hiren also led to a match in Hiren's home promotion, Sendai Girls' Pro Wrestling, on January 23, where Hiren again was victorious. Haruhi continued working against Black Dahlia for the next months and, on March 20, earned a measure of revenge on Ohata by defeating her in a singles match. On April 10, Haruhi also pinned Hiren in a six-woman tag team match, where she, Ayumi Kurihara and Syuri faced Hiren, Bambi and Ohata. On August 28 at Wave's fourth anniversary event, Haruhi teamed with Black Dahlia's newest member Cherry in a tag team match, where they defeated Aya Yuki and Ryo Mizunami. For the match, Haruhi wore a black attire, but made clear that even though she liked Cherry, she still hated Black Dahlia and was not affiliated with them. On September 4, Haruhi was teamed with rival Hiren in the 2011 Dual Shock Wave tournament to determine the inaugural Wave Tag Team Champions. The team was eliminated in their first round match by Yuki and Mizunami. On October 9, Haruhi was defeated by Mayumi Ozaki in her annual birthday match. On October 27, Haruhi represented Wave in Sendai Girls' Pro Wrestling's Joshi Puroresu Dantai Taikou Flash tournament, a single-elimination tournament, where different joshi promotions battled each other. In their first round match, Team Wave, which also Gami, Shuu Shibutani, Toshie Uematsu and Yumi Ohka, was defeated by Team JWP of Command Bolshoi, Hanako Nakamori, Kaori Yoneyama, Kayoko Haruyama and Leon. Haruhi started her 2012 in a six-woman tag team match on January 4, where she, Leon and Yuu Yamagata were defeated by Misaki Ohata, Cherry and Yumi Ohka, with Ohata pinning her former tag team partner for the win. On March 25, Haruhi made her debut for Oz Academy with a win over Nao Komatsu.

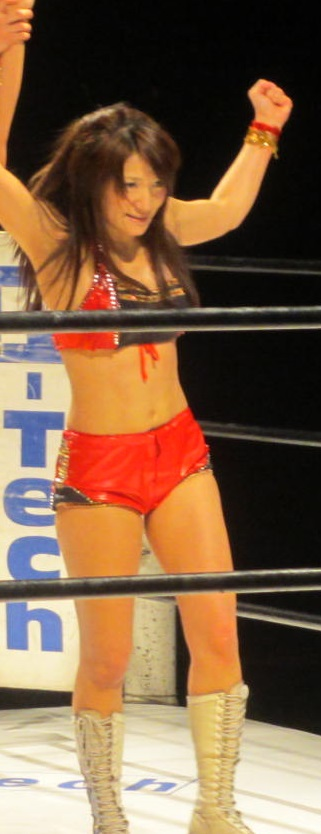
Haruhi in April 2016

On April 8, 2012, Haruhi was defeated in a singles match by her surprise opponent, Wrestling New Classic (WNC) representative and former Gatokunyan training partner Makoto. Haruhi and Makoto had their second encounter on April 18, when Makoto and Gami defeated Haruhi and Yuu Yamagata in a tag team match. On April 30, Haruhi took part in her trainer Toshie Uematsu's retirement match, where she and Shuu Shibutani were defeated by Uematsu and Ran Yu-Yu. Afterwards, Haruhi was sidelined for five weeks with an elbow injury. On July 16, Haruhi and Yuu Yamagata unsuccessfully challenged Gami and Tomoka Nakagawa for the Wave Tag Team Championship in a three-way match, which also included the team of Mio Shirai and Shuu Shibutani. On August 7, Haruhi defeated Mio Shirai for the first successful defense of the Garter Match Championship, nearly two and a half years after she had won the title. On September 3, it was announced that Haruhi and the returning Makoto had earned themselves a wild card entry into the 2012 Dual Shock Wave tournament. Despite initially opposing the partnership with Makoto, the team, dubbed "1st Impact", opened their tournament on September 25 with a win over Ayumi Kurihara and Mika Iida, after which Haruhi embraced the new partnership. However, the team went on to lose the following matches against Hikaru Shida and Yumi Ohka, and Shuu Shibutani and Syuri, and were, as a result, eliminated from the tournament. On November 27, Haruhi reunited with Makoto in a five-way tag team match, where they defeated Aya Yuki and Sawako Shimono, Cherry and Shuu Shibutani, Hikaru Shida and Nagisa Nozaki, and Ryo Mizunami and Yuu Yamagata to become the number one contenders to the Wave Tag Team Championship. 1st Impact received their title shot on December 16, but were defeated by the defending champions, Misaki Ohata and Tsukasa Fujimoto. On December 24, Haruhi made her debut for JWP, taking part in an eleven-woman Santa Cosplay Battle Royal, which was won by Nana Kawasa. On June 10, 2013, Haruhi made her debut for Wrestling New Classic, teaming with Gami in a "Wave offer match", where they defeated Shuu Shibutani and Yuu Yamagata. From May 6 to June 28, Haruhi took part in the 2013 Catch the Wave tournament. Despite opening with a win over Mio Shirai and later drawing with JWP Openweight Champion Arisa Nakajima, Haruhi lost her other four matches in the tournament and finished last in her round-robin block. On September 1, Haruhi entered the 2013 Dual Shock Wave tournament, teaming with Tomoka Nakagawa. Though the team managed to pick up big wins over Kana and Yumi Ohka, and Mio Shirai and Misaki Ohata, they were eliminated per pre-tournament stipulations after suffering their third loss in their fifth match on September 29 and not allowed to finish the tournament.

In early 2016, Haruhi formed a new tag team named "So on Flower" (SoF) with Aoi Kizuki. On March 13, the two won a three-way match to become the number one contenders to the Wave Tag Team Championship. They received their title shot on April 17, but were defeated by the defending champions, Las Aventureras (Ayako Hamada and Yuu Yamagata). On March 5, 2017, Haruhi received her first shot at the Wave Single Championship, but was defeated by the defending champion, Ryo Mizunami.

== Personal life ==
Haruhi's hobbies include cosplay, which she exhibits in her in-ring attires. She also frequently writes about other interests, including anime and video games, on her blog. She is a fan of Neon Genesis Evangelion and named her tag team with Makoto after the series.

In November 2009, Haruhi was involved in an incident, where a male fan approached her at a fan meeting and asked if he could touch her chest. After being denied, the man, during the following months, went on to send hundreds of e-mails and text messages to Haruhi, threatening to kill her, leading to her hiring a security team to keep her safe at events. On May 9, 2011, the man, 34-year-old Naoki Kobayashi, was arrested by the Japanese police.

Following the 2011 Tōhoku earthquake and tsunami, Haruhi became interested in weather forecasting and disaster prevention and began studying with the goal of becoming a weather forecaster. On October 6, 2014, it was announced that Haruhi had become the first professional athlete to pass the weather forecaster examination, which she had taken the previous January.

== Championships and accomplishments ==
- DDT Pro-Wrestling
  - GWC 6-Man Tag Team Championship (2 times) – with Katsuzaki Shunosuke and Shu Sakurai (2)
  - Ironman Heavymetalweight Championship (3 times)
- Oi Festa/Oi Dontaku Festival
  - Asia Pacific Women's Championship (1 time, current)
- Pro Wrestling Wave
  - Garter Match Championship (1 time)
  - TLW World Young Women's Tag Team Championship (1 time) – with Misaki Ohata
- Pure-J
  - Daily Sports Women's Tag Team Championship (2 times) – with Makoto (1) and Yuna Manase (1)
  - Pure-J Year-End Award (1 time)
    - Special Award (2019)
