= Shuu Shibutani =

Japanese professional wrestler

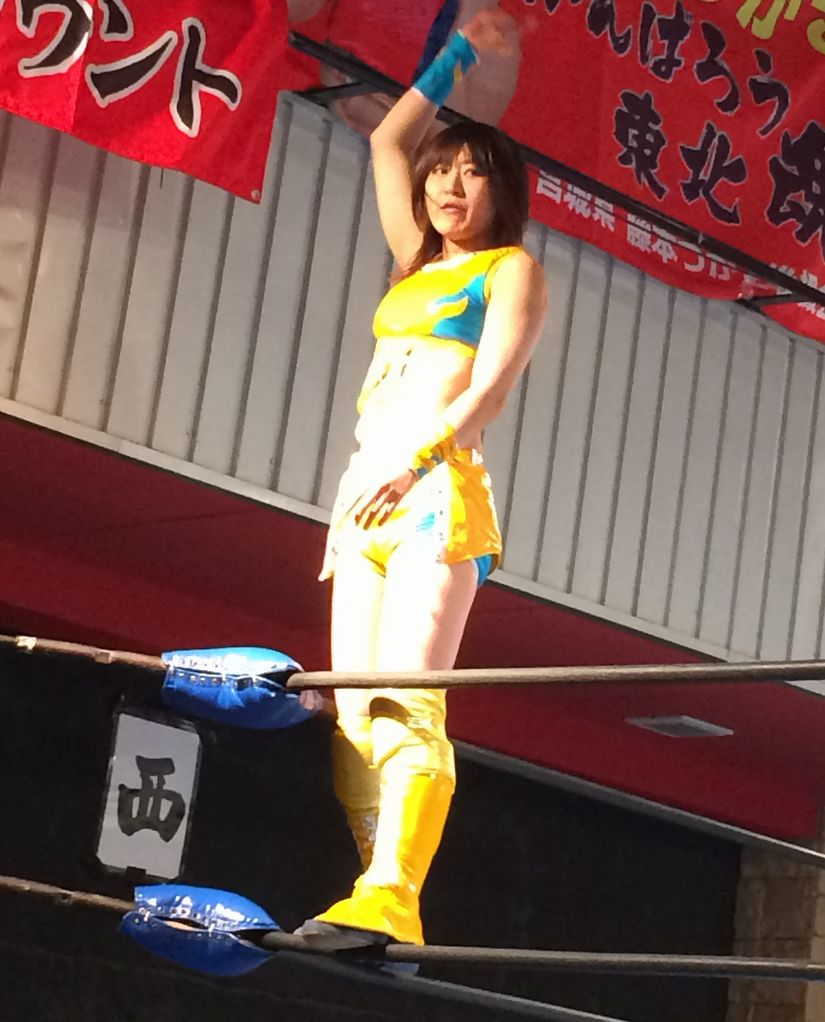
- Shibutani in February 2014

Personal information
- Born: Kana Shibutani; October 9, 1979 (age 46) Yokkaichi, Mie

Professional wrestling career
- Ring name(s): 2nd Generation Barikata Cotterine; Echisera; Keiko Saito; Shuu Shibutani
- Billed height: 1.58 m (5 ft 2 in)
- Billed weight: 53 kg (117 lb)
- Trained by: Mariko Yoshida
- Debut: September 19, 2004
- Retired: May 3, 2015

Kana Shibutani (渋谷 佳奈, Shibutani Kana; born October 9, 1979) is a retired Japanese professional wrestler better known by the ring name Shuu Shibutani (渋谷 シュウ, Shibutani Shū). Having started her career in the JDStar promotion in September 2004, Shibutani remained with the promotion until it folded in July 2007, after which she affiliated herself with Pro Wrestling Wave. After becoming a one-time Wave Tag Team Champion, she retired from professional wrestling in May 2015.

== Professional wrestling career ==
=== JDStar (2004–2007) ===
Shibutani received her training in professional wrestling at the dojo of the JDStar promotion, being part of the last batch of women to go through the promotion's "Athtress" program, which aimed at building physically attractive women into not only professional wrestlers, but also mainstream celebrities. Originally, Shibutani had unsuccessfully applied for a traineeship at the dojo of the Major Girl's Fighting AtoZ promotion. She made her in-ring debut under the ring name Shuu Shibutani on September 19, 2004, facing Akino at Shin-Kiba 1st Ring in Tokyo. Shibutani won her first title before the end of the year, when she and Athtress training partner Fuka defeated Gami and Drake Morimatsu for the TWF World Tag Team Championship on December 5. They, however, lost the title back to Gami and Morimatsu later that same day. Early on in her career, Shibutani earned praise for her talent and was put in a high-profile role, effectively replacing the injured Yumi Ohka. While working regularly for JDStar, she also made several appearances for the Ibuki promotion. From April to June 2006, Shibutani took part in the first ever League Princess tournament, but was eliminated from her round-robin, following a loss to Fuka in her final match on June 18. She was however recognized as having the best match of the tournament with Ayumi Kurihara. By late 2006, Shibutani had established herself as one of JDStar's top wrestlers, starting a storyline rivalry with the villainous Caribbean Gundan stable of Caribbean Kim, Caribbean Moon and Caribbean Rum. The rivalry culminated on March 21, 2007, in a six-woman elimination tag team match, where "Team Shin-Kiba" of Shibutani, Cherry and Yuri Urai defeated Caribbean Gundan with Shibutani scoring the last elimination over Kim. Two months later, JDStar announced that the promotion would be folding after the July 16 event. At the final event, Shibutani first teamed with Misaki Ohata in a tag team match, where they were defeated by Fuka and Jaguar Yokota. Later in the event, she won a multi-person battle royal, the last match ever put together by JDStar.

=== Pro Wrestling Wave (2007–2015) ===
On August 26, 2007, Shibutani worked the first ever event held by Pro Wrestling Wave, a promotion founded by Gami and JDStar alum Yumi Ohka, losing to Kaoru in a singles match. During the next months, Shibutani continued working both beside and against Kaoru and, on September 25, picked up her first win in Wave, when the two defeated Command Bolshoi and Dark Mask Bolshoi, the masked alter ego of Gami, in a tag team match. Five days later, Shibutani and Misaki Ohata defeated Arisa Nakajima and Cherry in Shibutani's final Wave match before going on a learning excursion to Mexico.

Shibutani returned from Mexico on December 31, 2007, to take part in JWP Joshi Puroresu's 5th Junior All Star event, where she, Asuka Ohki and Cherry defeated Kana, Misaki Ohata and Tomoka Nakagawa in a six-woman tag team match, with Shibutani pinning Ohata for the win. Four days later, Shibutani returned to Wave, when she teamed with Kaoru in a tag team match, where they were defeated by Bullfight Sora and noki-A. During the rest of the year, Shibutani began teaming regularly with Kana. On March 28, Shibutani made her debut for the Ice Ribbon promotion, teaming with Riho in a tag team match, where they defeated Hiroyo Matsumoto and Makoto. During the first three months of 2008, she also made regular appearances for the NEO Japan Ladies Pro Wrestling promotion. For her first sixteen months in Wave, Shibutani was officially a freelancer, but on January 4, 2009, the promotion announced that she had signed a contract to become an official member of its roster. Also in January, Shibutani formed a new partnership with Ayumi Kurihara. In March, Shibutani and Kurihara entered the TLW (Totally Lethal Wrestling) World Young Women's Tag Team Championship, defeating Hanako Kobayashi and Misaki Ohata in their first round match on March 20, before being eliminated in their semifinal match by Moeka Haruhi and Tomoka Nakagawa on March 25. From June to July, Shibutani took part in the first ever Catch the Wave tournament, where she finished with one draw and two losses, failing to advance from her round-robin block. On September 21, Shibutani won the Young Oh! Oh! tournament, defeating Mio Shirai and Ryo Mizunami in a three-way final match. The following November, Shibutani, Ayumi Kurihara and Kana took part in a captain's fall six-woman tag team tournament, where they made it to the finals, before losing to Gami, Io Shirai and Mio Shirai. In May 2010, Shibutani entered the 2010 Catch the Wave tournament, but again failed to make it out of her round with a record of two wins and two losses. In August, Shibutani tore both her meniscus and anterior cruciate ligament and was sidelined from in-ring action.

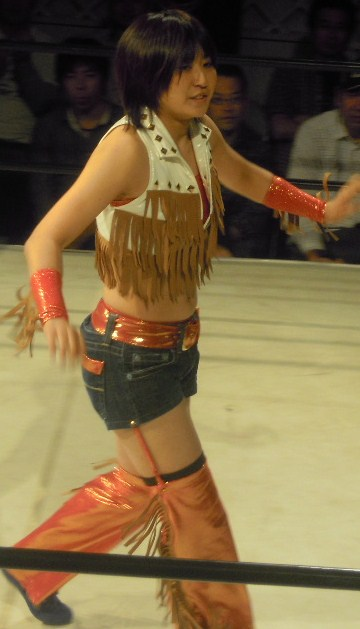
Shibutani in October 2011

After being sidelined for over a year, Shibutani returned to Pro Wrestling Wave on August 28, 2011, losing to Akino in her return match. On September 4, Shibutani and Cherry entered the 2011 Dual Shock Wave tournament as the "Classic Gals", but were eliminated in their first round match by Ayumi Kurihara and Kana, who went on to win the entire tournament. On October 27, Shibutani represented Wave in Sendai Girls' Pro Wrestling's Joshi Puroresu Dantai Taikou Flash tournament, a single-elimination tournament, where different joshi promotions battled each other. In their first round match, Team Wave, which also Gami, Moeka Haruhi, Toshie Uematsu and Yumi Ohka, was defeated by Team JWP of Command Bolshoi, Hanako Nakamori, Kaori Yoneyama, Kayoko Haruyama and Leon. Shibutani finished off 2011 with a big singles win over Yumi Ohka on December 11 with her new finishing maneuver, later named Time Machine ni Notte ("Ride the Time Machine"). On January 4 at Wave's first event of 2012, Shibutani picked up another big singles win over Wave Tag Team Champion Ayumi Kurihara. On February 1, Shibutani, Kurihara and Mika Iida came together with Kana and Mio Shirai to form the White Tails stable, named in reference to Wave's top villainous alliance, Black Dahlia. On April 30, Shibutani took part in Toshie Uematsu's retirement match, a tag team match, where she and Moeka Haruhi were defeated by Uematsu and Ran Yu-Yu. On May 16, Shibutani entered the 2012 Catch the Wave tournament, taking part in a round-robin block made up members of White Tails. In her opening match of the tournament, Shibutani was defeated by Ayumi Kurihara. In her second match on May 29, Shibutani wrestled Kana to a fifteen-minute time limit draw. On June 17, Shibutani wrestled her second time limit draw of the tournament with guest White Tails member, Wrestling New Classic (WNC) representative Syuri. Shibutani finished her tournament on July 1 with a win over Mio Shirai, failing to advance from the block. On July 16, Shibutani and Shirai unsuccessfully challenged Gami and Tomoka Nakagawa for the Wave Tag Team Championship in a three-way elimination match, which also included the team of Moeka Haruhi and Yuu Yamagata. On September 1, Shibutani made her first appearance for Ice Ribbon in four and a half years, defeating Miyako Matsumoto in a singles match. On September 23 at Ribbon no Kishitachi 2012, Shibutani took part in a three-way match, where Hailey Hatred defeated Neko Nitta to capture the Triangle Ribbon Championship. Two days later, Shibutani entered the 2012 Dual Shock Wave tournament alongside Syuri. After wins over Shidarezakura (Hikaru Shida and Yumi Ohka) and 1st Impact (Makoto and Moeka Haruhi), and a loss against Kurigohan (Ayumi Kurihara and Mika Iida), Shibutani and Syuri finished tied at the top of their block with Shida and Ohka. On November 16, Shibutani and Syuri defeated Shida and Ohka in a playoff match to advance to the finals of the tournament, where, later that same day, they were defeated by Makkurokorosuke (Misaki Ohata and Tsukasa Fujimoto). On June 10, Shibutani made her debut for Wrestling New Classic, teaming with Yuu Yamagata in a "Wave offer match", where they were defeated by Gami and Moeka Haruhi. From May to July 2013, Shibutani took part in the 2013 Catch the Wave tournament, where she finished her round-robin block with a record of three wins and three losses, advancing to the knockout stage after defeating Cherry, Hikaru Shida and Mio Shirai in a playoff match on June 28. On July 15, Shibutani was defeated in the first round of the knockout stage by JWP Joshi Puroresu representative Arisa Nakajima. She, however, claimed third spot in the tournament by defeating Syuri, Tomoka Nakagawa and Yuu Yamagata in a four-way elimination match later that same event.

On August 25, Shibutani won her first title in Wave, when she and her Classic Gals partner Cherry defeated Yoko Hatanaka (Gami and Tomoka Nakagawa) for the Wave Tag Team Championship. On September 1, Shibutani and Cherry entered the 2013 Dual Shock Wave tournament, however, after losing three of their first four matches, they were, per pre-tournament stipulations, instantly eliminated and not allowed to finish the tournament. On September 15, Shibutani made an appearance for Wrestle-1, losing to fellow Wave worker Ryo Mizunami in a singles match. On October 30, the Classic Gals lost the Wave Tag Team Championship in their first defense against the winners of the 2013 Dual Shock Wave, Las Aventureras (Ayako Hamada and Yuu Yamagata). On November 20, Shibutani, Cherry and Mika Iida, forming a trio named Classic Gohan, entered a 6-Person Tag Tournament, defeating Team O-tomodachi ni Narimashou (Fairy Nipponbashi, Kyusei Sakura Hirota and Moeka Haruhi) in their first round match. On November 27, Classic Gohan was eliminated from the tournament in the semifinals by Kuros (Mio Shirai, Misaki Ohata and Tsukasa Fujimoto). On December 15, Shibutani received her first shot at the Wave Single Championship, but was defeated by the defending champion, Yumi Ohka. On January 11, 2014, Shibutani returned to Ice Ribbon, teaming with Tsukushi in a tag team main event, where they defeated Miyako Matsumoto and Tsukasa Fujimoto. After pinning Fujimoto for the win, Shibutani was named the next challenger for Ice Ribbon's top title, the ICE×∞ Championship, held by Fujimoto. Shibutani received her title shot on February 9, but was defeated by Fujimoto. On March 30, Shibutani defeated Cherry and Neko Nitta in a three-way match to win Ice Ribbon's Triangle Ribbon Championship. She made her first successful title defense on June 7 at Ice Ribbon's eighth anniversary event against Cherry and Miyako Matsumoto. On August 31, Shibutani lost the Triangle Ribbon Championship to Neko Nitta in a three-way match, also involving Leon. On October 5, Shibutani made a special appearance for All Japan Pro Wrestling, teaming with Yumi Ohka in a tag team match, where they defeated Kana and Mika Iida.

On December 14, after she and Cherry had failed in their attempt to regain the Wave Tag Team Championship from Las Aventureras, Shibutani announced she would be retiring from professional wrestling on May 3, 2015. On January 12, 2015, Shibutani made an appearance for Reina Joshi Puroresu, unsuccessfully challenging Syuri for the CMLL World Women's Championship. Shibutani then started a retirement tour, which led to her making her final appearances for various promotions, including Ice Ribbon, JWP Joshi Puroresu, Oz Academy, and Union Pro Wrestling. Shibutani's retirement match took place on May 3 and saw her and Cherry defeat Akino and Yumi Ohka in a tag team match with Shibutani pinning Akino for the final win of her career.

== Championships and accomplishments ==
- Ice Ribbon
  - Triangle Ribbon Championship (1 time)
- JDStar
  - TWF World Tag Team Championship (1 time) – with Fuka
  - League Princess Best Bout Award (2006) vs. Ayumi Kurihara on May 4
- Pro Wrestling Wave
  - Wave Tag Team Championship (1 time) – with Cherry
  - Young Oh! Oh! Tournament (2009)
  - Catch the Wave Award
    - Best Performance Award (2013)
