= Catch the Wave =

Japanese professional wrestling tournament

Catch the Wave (Japanese: キャッチ・ザ・ウェーブ, Hepburn: Kyatchi za U~ēbu) is an annual professional wrestling tournament promoted by the Pro Wrestling Wave promotion. It has been held since 2009 and takes place between the end of April and the beginning of August. As up until March 2013 there were no singles championships in Pro Wrestling Wave, Catch the Wave was effectively the top singles achievement in the promotion. The tournament is contested in round-robin format with the winners of each block advancing to the semifinals. From 2010 to 2012, the tournament included a "Loser Revival" battle royal, where already eliminated wrestlers battle for the fourth and final spot in the semifinals of the tournament. This system allowed the tournament to be won twice by a wrestler, who was originally eliminated in the round-robin section. From 2011 onwards, the tournament has concluded with an award ceremony. The winner of the main tournament earns the title of "Nami Onna" (波女; "Wave Woman") and ¥1,000,000. Since 2014, the tournament occasionally held a separate competition for rookie wrestlers, running concurrently with the main blocks.

== List of winners ==
Main tournament

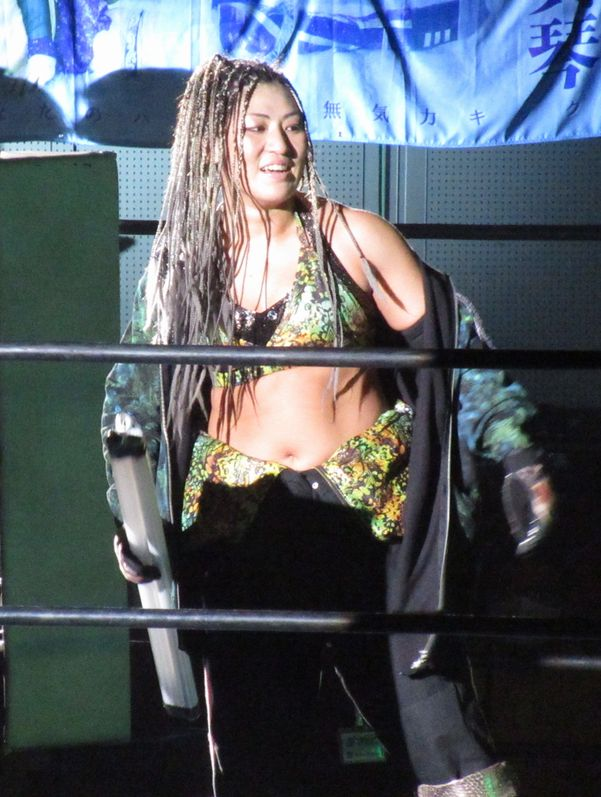
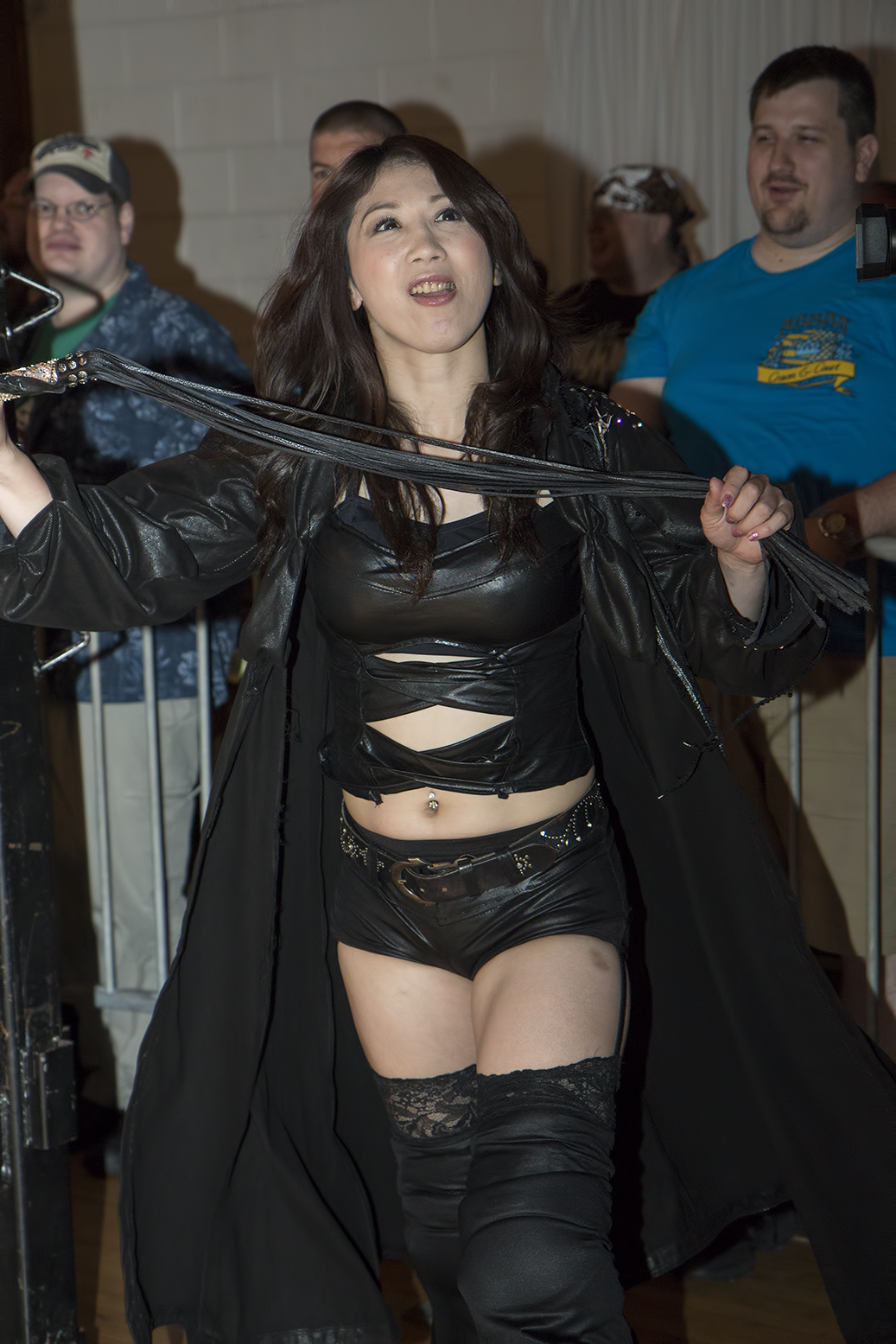
Rina Yamashita (left) and Yumi Ohka (right) are record two-time Catch the Wave winners

Year	Winner	Total won	Ref.
2009	Yumi Ohka	1	
2010	Gami	1	
2011	Kana	1	
2012	Ayumi Kurihara	1	
2013	Misaki Ohata	1	
2014	Hikaru Shida	1	
2015	Yumi Ohka	2	
2016	Ryo Mizunami	1	
2017	Rina Yamashita	1	
2018	Rina Yamashita	2	
2019	Takumi Iroha	1	
2021	Miyuki Takase	1	
2022	Suzu Suzuki	1	
2023	Asuka	1	
2024	Saya Kamitani	1	
2025	Kohaku	1	

Rookie tournament

Year	Winner	Total won	Ref.
2014	Kaho Kobayashi	1	
2015	Meiko Tanaka	1	
2016	Yuka	1	
2019	Hiro'e	1	
2021	Tomoka Inaba	1	
2024	Honoka	1	

== 2009 ==
The 2009 Catch the Wave took place over nine shows between May 27 and August 11. The tournament included sixteen participants split up into four blocks titled "Comical", "UK", "Visual Technical" and "Young". Matches in the UK block could only be won by knockout or submission and had a ten-minute time limit as opposed to fifteen-minute time limits in the other blocks. Outside participants in the tournament included freelancers Apple Miyuki, Bullfight Sora, Kaoru and Kyoko Kimura, JWP Joshi Puroresu's Pinky Mayuka and Sendai Girls' Pro Wrestling's Ryo Mizunami.

Final standings
Comical		UK		Visual Technical		Young	
Bullfight Sora	3	Kana	5	Yumi Ohka	4	Ayumi Kurihara	4
Cherry	3	Kyoko Kimura	4	Kaoru	3	Ryo Mizunami	4
Gami	3	Misaki Ohata	2	Toshie Uematsu	3	Moeka Haruhi	2
Ran Yu-Yu	3	Shuu Shibutani	1	Apple Miyuki	2	Pinky Mayuka	2

Comical	Bullfight Sora	Cherry	Gami	Ran Yu-Yu
Bullfight Sora	X	Draw (10:00)	Draw (15:00)	Draw (15:00)
Cherry	Draw (10:00)	X	Draw (15:00)	Draw (15:00)
Gami	Draw (15:00)	Draw (15:00)	X	Draw (15:00)
Ran Yu-Yu	Draw (15:00)	Draw (15:00)	Draw (15:00)	X
UK	Kana	Kyoko Kimura	Misaki Ohata	Shuu Shibutani
Kana	X	Draw (10:00)	Kana (9:39)	Kana (9:52)
Kyoko Kimura	Draw (10:00)	X	Kimura (7:38)	Draw (10:00)
Misaki Ohata	Kana (9:39)	Kimura (7:38)	X	Ohata (8:54)
Shuu Shibutani	Kana (9:52)	Draw (10:00)	Ohata (8:54)	X
Visual Technical	Apple Miyuki	Kaoru	Toshie Uematsu	Yumi Ohka
Apple Miyuki	X	Kaoru (11:06)	Uematsu (11:19)	Miyuki (10:19)
Kaoru	Kaoru (11:06)	X	Draw (15:00)	Ohka (10:16)
Toshie Uematsu	Uematsu (11:19)	Draw (15:00)	X	Ohka (11:21)
Yumi Ohka	Miyuki (10:19)	Ohka (10:16)	Ohka (11:21)	X
Young	Ayumi Kurihara	Moeka Haruhi	Pinky Mayuka	Ryo Mizunami
Ayumi Kurihara	X	Kurihara (12:45)	Draw (20:00)	Draw (20:00)
Moeka Haruhi	Kurihara (12:45)	X	Haruhi (9:43)	Mizunami (10:08)
Pinky Mayuka	Draw (20:00)	Haruhi (9:43)	X	Draw (20:00)
Ryo Mizunami	Draw (20:00)	Mizunami (10:08)	Draw (20:00)	X

Playoff matches (August 10)
Ayumi Kurihara	Pin
Ryo Mizunami	9:44
Bullfight Sora	Pin
Cherry; Gami; Ran Yu-Yu	17:41

Semifinals (August 11)
Ayumi Kurihara	Pin
Bullfight Sora	4:24
Yumi Ohka	Pin
Kana	15:39

Finals (August 11)
Ayumi Kurihara	Pin
Yumi Ohka	17:25

== 2010 ==
The 2010 Catch the Wave took place over ten shows between May 30 and August 11. The tournament included fifteen participants split up into three blocks titled "Rival", "Visual Technical" and "Young". Outside participants in the tournament included freelancers Asami Kawasaki, Io Shirai, Kana and Mio Shirai, JWP Joshi Puroresu's Senri Kuroki and Sendai Girls' Pro Wrestling's Ryo Mizunami. On July 4, Kuroki was sidelined with gastroesophageal reflux disease and was forced to forfeit the rest of her matches in the tournament. This tournament introduced the concept of the "Loser Revival" battle royal, where those that finished second and third in their blocks were allowed to compete for a spot in the semifinals of the tournament.

Final standings
Rival		Visual Technical		Young	
Ayumi Kurihara	6	Yumi Ohka	5	Ryo Mizunami	6
Cherry	5	Kana	5	Io Shirai	6
Asami Kawasaki	4	Gami	4	Misaki Ohata	6
Shuu Shibutani	4	Toshie Uematsu	4	Sawako Shimono	2
Moeka Haruhi	1	Mio Shirai	2	Senri Kuroki	0

Rival	Asami Kawasaki	Ayumi Kurihara	Cherry	Moeka Haruhi	Shuu Shibutani
Asami Kawasaki	X	Kurihara (11:01)	Cherry (6:15)	Kawasaki (6:37)	Kawasaki (12:26)
Ayumi Kurihara	Kurihara (11:01)	X	Kurihara (9:06)	Kurihara (11:58)	Shibutani (11:56)
Cherry	Cherry (6:15)	Kurihara (9:06)	X	Draw (15:00)	Cherry (3:07)
Moeka Haruhi	Kawasaki (6:37)	Kurihara (11:58)	Draw (15:00)	X	Shibutani (13:07)
Shuu Shibutani	Kawasaki (12:26)	Shibutani (11:56)	Cherry (3:07)	Shibutani (13:07)	X
Visual Technical	Gami	Kana	Mio Shirai	Toshie Uematsu	Yumi Ohka
Gami	X	Draw (20:00)	Draw (20:00)	Draw (20:00)	Draw (20:00)
Kana	Draw (20:00)	X	Kana (9:22)	Uematsu (14:49)	Kana (3:36)
Mio Shirai	Draw (20:00)	Kana (9:22)	X	Draw (10:37)	Ohka (8:54)
Toshie Uematsu	Draw (20:00)	Uematsu (14:49)	Draw (10:37)	X	Ohka (9:09)
Yumi Ohka	Draw (20:00)	Kana (3:36)	Ohka (8:54)	Ohka (9:09)	X
Young	Io Shirai	Misaki Ohata	Ryo Mizunami	Senri Kuroki	Sawako Shimono
Io Shirai	X	Draw (10:00)	Draw (10:00)	Shirai (forfeit)	Shirai (8:41)
Misaki Ohata	Draw (10:00)	X	Draw (10:00)	Ohata (forfeit)	Ohata (6:18)
Ryo Mizunami	Draw (10:00)	Draw (10:00)	X	Mizunami (7:11)	Mizunami (8:53)
Senri Kuroki	Shirai (forfeit)	Ohata (forfeit)	Mizunami (7:11)	X	Shimono (forfeit)
Sawako Shimono	Shirai (8:41)	Ohata (6:18)	Mizunami (8:53)	Shimono (forfeit)	X

- August 10:
  - Visual Technical block third place playoff match: Gami defeated Toshie Uematsu (1:22).
  - Loser Revival battle royal: Gami defeated Asami Kawasaki, Cherry, Io Shirai, Kana and Misaki Ohata (8:15).

Playoff matches (August 10)
Ryo Mizunami	Pin
Io Shirai; Misaki Ohata	10:46
Yumi Ohka	Pin
Kana	8:24

Semifinals (August 11)
Ayumi Kurihara	Pin
Ryo Mizunami	5:04
Gami	Pin
Yumi Ohka	9:53

Finals (August 11)
Ayumi Kurihara	Pin
Gami	16:29

== 2011 ==
The 2011 Catch the Wave took place over eight shows between May 2 and July 24. The tournament included fourteen participants split up into three blocks titled "Technical", "Visual" and "Young". Outside participants in the tournament included freelancer Nagisa Nozaki, Kagetsu and Ryo Mizunami from Sendai Girls' Pro Wrestling and Nao Komatsu from Oz Academy. This was the first tournament, where all wrestlers eliminated after the round-robin portion of the tournament were allowed to enter the "Loser Revival" battle royal.

Final standings
Technical		Visual		Young	
Misaki Ohata	5	Toshie Uematsu	8	Kagetsu	5
Ayumi Kurihara	4	Tomoka Nakagawa	5	Sawako Shimono	4
Nagisa Nozaki	4	Cherry	3	Nao Komatsu	2
Yumi Ohka	4	Kana	3	Mika Iida	1
Mio Shirai	3	Ryo Mizunami	1		

Technical	Ayumi Kurihara	Mio Shirai	Misaki Ohata	Nagisa Nozaki	Yumi Ohka
Ayumi Kurihara	X	Kurihara (12:02)	Ohata (10:37)	Kurihara (6:53)	Ohka (14:22)
Mio Shirai	Kurihara (12:02)	X	Draw (11:32)	Nozaki (5:06)	Shirai (11:14)
Misaki Ohata	Ohata (10:37)	Draw (11:32)	X	Ohata (4:59)	Ohka (11:52)
Nagisa Nozaki	Kurihara (6:53)	Nozaki (5:06)	Ohata (4:59)	X	Nozaki (5:01)
Yumi Ohka	Ohka (14:22)	Shirai (11:14)	Ohka (11:52)	Nozaki (5:01)	X
Visual	Cherry	Kana	Ryo Mizunami	Tomoka Nakagawa	Toshie Uematsu
Cherry	X	Draw (15:00)	Cherry (9:24)	Nakagawa (12:21)	Uematsu (12:40)
Kana	Draw (15:00)	X	Draw (15:00)	Draw (15:00)	Uematsu (10:35)
Ryo Mizunami	Cherry (9:24)	Draw (15:00)	X	Nakagawa (8:56)	Uematsu (9:07)
Tomoka Nakagawa	Nakagawa (12:21)	Draw (15:00)	Nakagawa (8:56)	X	Uematsu (5:30)
Toshie Uematsu	Uematsu (12:40)	Uematsu (10:35)	Uematsu (9:07)	Uematsu (5:30)	X
Young	Kagetsu	Mika Iida	Nao Komatsu	Sawako Shimono	
Kagetsu	X	Kagetsu (6:56)	Kagetsu (7:01)	Draw (10:00)	
Mika Iida	Kagetsu (6:56)	X	Komatsu (8:23)	Draw (10:00)	
Nao Komatsu	Kagetsu (7:01)	Komatsu (8:23)	X	Shimono (8:10)	
Sawako Shimono	Draw (10:00)	Draw (10:00)	Shimono (8:10)	X	

- July 24:
  - Loser Revival battle royal: Kana defeated Ayumi Kurihara, Mika Iida, Mio Shirai, Nagisa Nozaki, Nao Komatsu, Ryo Mizunami, Sawako Shimono, Tomoka Nakagawa and Yumi Ohka (8:28).

Semifinals
Toshie Uematsu	Pin
Misaki Ohata	13:38
Kana	Sub
Kagetsu	9:48

Final
Misaki Ohata	Pin
Kana	10:14

- Post-tournament awards:
  - Best Bout Award: Ayumi Kurihara vs. Yumi Ohka, May 29
  - Best Performance Award: Nao Komatsu cheering squad
  - Fighting Spirit Award: Mika Iida
  - Outstanding Performance Award: Mio Shirai
  - Technique Award: Tomoka Nakagawa

== 2012 ==
The 2012 Catch the Wave took place over nine shows between April 30 and July 16. The tournament included fifteen participants split up into three blocks titled "Black Dahlia", "Power" and "White Tails", with two of the blocks made up of members of the Black Dahlia and White Tails stables. Outside participants in the tournament included Hamuko Hoshi and Tsukasa Fujimoto from Ice Ribbon and Syuri from Wrestling New Classic (WNC). The tournament featured a title change, when on June 8, Mio Shirai defeated Ayumi Kurihara to win DDT Pro-Wrestling's Ironman Heavymetalweight Championship.

Final standings
Black Dahlia		Power		White Tails	
Yumi Ohka	5	Ryo Mizunami	6	Ayumi Kurihara	5
Tsukasa Fujimoto	5	Ayako Hamada	5	Mio Shirai	4
Cherry	4	Sawako Shimono	5	Shuu Shibutani	4
Misaki Ohata	4	Hamuko Hoshi	4	Syuri	4
Hanako Nakamori	2	Aya Yuki	0	Kana	3

Black Dahlia	Cherry	Hanako Nakamori	Misaki Ohata	Tsukasa Fujimoto	Yumi Ohka
Cherry	X	Nakamori (5:19)	Ohata (8:46)	Cherry (8:16)	Cherry (3:08)
Hanako Nakamori	Nakamori (5:19)	X	Ohata (8:11)	Fujimoto (8:08)	Ohka (10:42)
Misaki Ohata	Ohata (8:46)	Ohata (8:11)	X	Fujimoto (12:38)	Ohka (13:28)
Tsukasa Fujimoto	Cherry (8:16)	Fujimoto (8:08)	Fujimoto (12:38)	X	Draw (15:00)
Yumi Ohka	Cherry (3:08)	Ohka (10:42)	Ohka (13:28)	Draw (15:00)	X
Power	Ayako Hamada	Aya Yuki	Hamuko Hoshi	Ryo Mizunami	Sawako Shimono
Ayako Hamada	X	Hamada (14:48)	Hamada (5:35)	Mizunami (13:24)	Draw (15:00)
Aya Yuki	Hamada (14:48)	X	Hoshi (6:10)	Mizunami (4:36)	Shimono (7:50)
Hamuko Hoshi	Hamada (5:35)	Hoshi (6:10)	X	Hoshi (4:13)	Shimono (3:55)
Ryo Mizunami	Mizunami (13:24)	Mizunami (4:36)	Hoshi (4:13)	X	Mizunami (12:33)
Sawako Shimono	Draw (15:00)	Shimono (7:50)	Shimono (3:55)	Mizunami (12:33)	X
White Tails	Ayumi Kurihara	Kana	Mio Shirai	Shuu Shibutani	Syuri
Ayumi Kurihara	X	Kurihara (8:08)	Shirai (1:29)	Kurihara (14:32)	Draw (15:00)
Kana	Kurihara (8:08)	X	Shirai (5:27)	Draw (15:00)	Kana (12:16)
Mio Shirai	Shirai (1:29)	Shirai (5:27)	X	Shibutani (4:29)	Syuri (6:05)
Shuu Shibutani	Kurihara (14:32)	Draw (15:00)	Shibutani (4:29)	X	Draw (15:00)
Syuri	Draw (15:00)	Kana (12:16)	Syuri (6:05)	Draw (15:00)	X

- July 1:
  - Loser Revival battle royal: Misaki Ohata defeated Ayako Hamada, Aya Yuki, Cherry, Hamuko Hoshi, Hanako Nakamori, Kana, Mio Shirai, Sawako Shimono, Shuu Shibutani, Syuri and Tsukasa Fujimoto (13:20).

Black Dahlia block playoff match (July 1)
Yumi Ohka	Pin
Tsukasa Fujimoto	16:58

Semifinals (July 16)
Yumi Ohka	Pin
Ayumi Kurihara	15:11
Ryo Mizunami	Pin
Misaki Ohata	14:40

Finals (July 16)
Ayumi Kurihara	Pin
Ryo Mizunami	20:57

- Post-tournament awards:
  - Best Bout Award: Ayumi Kurihara vs. Syuri, June 24
  - Best Performance Award: Hamuko Hoshi
  - Fighting Spirit Award: Hamuko Hoshi
  - Outstanding Performance Award: Sawako Shimono
  - Technique Award: Tsukasa Fujimoto

== 2013 ==
The 2013 Catch the Wave took take place over ten shows between May 6 and July 15. The tournament format, which for the first time featured only two round-robin blocks, and the participants were announced on April 26. Outside participants included Arisa Nakajima from JWP Joshi Puroresu, Hikaru Shida from Ice Ribbon, Kagetsu from Sendai Girls' Pro Wrestling and Syuri from Wrestling New Classic (WNC). The top three wrestlers from each block advanced to the knockout stage of the tournament. The winners of the blocks earned spots in the semifinals, while numbers two and three were entered into the first round of the knockout tournament. The two block system resulted in the elimination of the "Loser Revival" battle royal. The tournament featured the first Catch the Wave match to take place outside of Pro Wrestling Wave, when Shuu Shibutani and Syuri faced each other on June 8 in Wave's sister promotion, Osaka Joshi Pro Wrestling. The winner of the tournament became the number one contender to the Wave Single Championship.

Final standings
Glamorous		Slender	
Yuu Yamagata	8	Syuri	8
Tomoka Nakagawa	7	Arisa Nakajima	7
Misaki Ohata	6	Shuu Shibutani	6
Kagetsu	6	Cherry	6
Ryo Mizunami	6	Hikaru Shida	6
Ayako Hamada	5	Mio Shirai	6
Gami	4	Moeka Haruhi	3

Glamorous	Ayako Hamada	Gami	Kagetsu	Misaki Ohata	Ryo Mizunami	Tomoka Nakagawa	Yuu Yamagata
Ayako Hamada	X	Gami (14:21)	Draw (15:00)	Hamada (7:23)	Hamada (9:30)	Nakagawa (12:09)	Yamagata (10:57)
Gami	Gami (14:21)	X	Kagetsu (5:41)	Ohata (7:26)	Gami (4:51)	Nakagawa (12:28)	Yamagata (12:45)
Kagetsu	Draw (15:00)	Kagetsu (5:41)	X	Draw (15:00)	Draw (15:00)	Nakagawa (8:03)	Draw (15:00)
Misaki Ohata	Hamada (7:23)	Ohata (7:26)	Draw (15:00)	X	Mizunami (3:08)	Ohata (5:07)	Draw (15:00)
Ryo Mizunami	Hamada (9:30)	Gami (4:51)	Draw (15:00)	Mizunami (3:08)	X	Draw (15:00)	Mizunami (13:22)
Tomoka Nakagawa	Nakagawa (12:09)	Nakagawa (12:28)	Nakagawa (8:03)	Ohata (5:07)	Draw (15:00)	X	Yamagata (3:36)
Yuu Yamagata	Yamagata (10:57)	Yamagata (12:45)	Draw (15:00)	Draw (15:00)	Mizunami (13:22)	Yamagata (3:36)	X
Slender	Arisa Nakajima	Cherry	Hikaru Shida	Mio Shirai	Moeka Haruhi	Shuu Shibutani	Syuri
Arisa Nakajima	X	Nakajima (8:09)	Draw (15:00)	Shirai (3:23)	Draw (15:00)	Nakajima (8:33)	Draw (15:00)
Cherry	Nakajima (8:09)	X	Shida (5:54)	Cherry (5:14)	Cherry (7:35)	Cherry (7:13)	Syuri (8:15)
Hikaru Shida	Draw (15:00)	Shida (5:54)	X	Shirai (6:28)	Shida (8:28)	Shibutani (7:18)	Draw (15:00)
Mio Shirai	Shirai (3:23)	Cherry (5:14)	Shirai (6:28)	X	Haruhi (6:25)	Shibutani (4:21)	Shirai (5:40)
Moeka Haruhi	Draw (15:00)	Cherry (7:35)	Shida (8:28)	Haruhi (6:25)	X	Shibutani (5:24)	Syuri (6:54)
Shuu Shibutani	Nakajima (8:33)	Cherry (7:13)	Shibutani (7:18)	Shibutani (4:21)	Shibutani (5:24)	X	Syuri (9:53)
Syuri	Draw (15:00)	Syuri (8:15)	Draw (15:00)	Shirai (5:40)	Syuri (6:54)	Syuri (9:53)	X

- June 28:
  - Glamorous block third place playoff match: Misaki Ohata defeated Kagetsu and Ryo Mizunami (11:28).
  - Slender block third place playoff match: Shuu Shibutani defeated Cherry, Hikaru Shida and Mio Shirai (10:37).

First round (July 15)
Misaki Ohata	Pin
Tomoka Nakagawa	6:06
Shuu Shibutani	Pin
Arisa Nakajima	6:43

Semifinals (July 15)
Yuu Yamagata	Pin
Misaki Ohata	4:17
Arisa Nakajima	Pin
Syuri	11:02

Finals (July 15)
Misaki Ohata	Pin
Arisa Nakajima	13:06

- July 15:
  - Third place four-way elimination match: Shuu Shibutani defeated Syuri, Tomoka Nakagawa and Yuu Yamagata (3:58).
- Post-tournament awards:
  - Best Bout Award: Ayako Hamada vs. Ryo Mizunami, May 26
  - Best Performance Award: Shuu Shibutani
  - Fighting Spirit Award: Kagetsu
  - Outstanding Performance Award: Mio Shirai
  - Technique Award: Yuu Yamagata

== 2014 ==
The 2014 Catch the Wave took place between May 5 and July 27. The tournament once again featured two round-robin blocks of seven wrestlers, divided by their age. Block "Adeyaka" ("Elegant") featured wrestlers in their thirties and block "Tsuyayaka" ("Glossy") wrestlers in their twenties. Outside participants included Tsukasa Fujimoto from Ice Ribbon and freelancers Hikaru Shida, Hiroyo Matsumoto, Kyoko Kimura and Kyusei Sakura Hirota.

Final standings
Adeyaka		Tsuyayaka	
Yumi Ohka	8	Hikaru Shida	10
Tsukasa Fujimoto	7	Hiroyo Matsumoto	9
Tomoka Nakagawa	7	Misaki Ohata	8
Kyoko Kimura	7	Mika Iida	6
Kyusei Sakura Hirota	6	Mio Shirai	5
Shuu Shibutani	5	Moeka Haruhi	3
Yuu Yamagata	2	Sawako Shimono	1

Adeyaka	Kyoko Kimura	Kyusei Sakura Hirota	Shuu Shibutani	Tomoka Nakagawa	Tsukasa Fujimoto	Yumi Ohka	Yuu Yamagata
Kyoko Kimura	X	Hirota (7:45)	Kimura (11:00)	Kimura (11:38)	Fujimoto (8:53)	Draw (15:00)	Kimura (9:28)
Kyusei Sakura Hirota	Hirota (7:45)	X	Hirota (9:18)	Nakagawa (6:15)	Fujimoto (9:39)	Ohka (6:22)	Hirota (5:48)
Shuu Shibutani	Kimura (11:00)	Hirota (9:18)	X	Draw (15:00)	Shibutani (8:50)	Ohka (10:27)	Shibutani (9:34)
Tomoka Nakagawa	Kimura (11:38)	Nakagawa (6:15)	Draw (15:00)	X	Draw (15:00)	Draw (15:00)	Nakagawa (12:41)
Tsukasa Fujimoto	Fujimoto (8:53)	Fujimoto (9:39)	Shibutani (8:50)	Draw (15:00)	X	Fujimoto (14:37)	Yamagata (11:11)
Yumi Ohka	Draw (15:00)	Ohka (6:22)	Ohka (10:27)	Draw (15:00)	Fujimoto (14:37)	X	Ohka (10:00)
Yuu Yamagata	Kimura (9:28)	Hirota (5:48)	Shibutani (9:34)	Nakagawa (12:41)	Yamagata (11:11)	Ohka (10:00)	X
Tsuyayaka	Hikaru Shida	Hiroyo Matsumoto	Mika Iida	Mio Shirai	Misaki Ohata	Moeka Haruhi	Sawako Shimono
Hikaru Shida	X	Shida (11:18)	Draw (15:00)	Shida (7:13)	Draw (15:00)	Shida (10:15)	Shida (9:18)
Hiroyo Matsumoto	Shida (11:18)	X	Matsumoto (14:27)	Matsumoto (6:58)	Draw (15:00)	Matsumoto (3:01)	Matsumoto (11:13)
Mika Iida	Draw (15:00)	Matsumoto (14:27)	X	Draw (15:00)	Iida (13:34)	Haruhi (9:43)	Iida (5:11)
Mio Shirai	Shida (7:13)	Matsumoto (6:58)	Draw (15:00)	X	Ohata (10:00)	Shirai (5:27)	Shirai (4:33)
Misaki Ohata	Draw (15:00)	Draw (15:00)	Iida (13:34)	Ohata (10:00)	X	Ohata (9:20)	Ohata (9:04)
Moeka Haruhi	Shida (10:15)	Matsumoto (3:01)	Haruhi (9:43)	Shirai (5:27)	Ohata (9:20)	X	Draw (15:00)
Sawako Shimono	Shida (9:18)	Matsumoto (11:13)	Iida (5:11)	Shirai (4:33)	Ohata (9:04)	Draw (15:00)	X

- July 13:
  - Adeyaka block second and third place playoff three-way match:
    Kyoko Kimura vs. Tomoka Nakagawa vs. Tsukasa Fujimoto
    Fujimoto defeated Nakagawa (12:34),
    Nakagawa defeated Kimura (17:37).

First round (July 27)
Tsukasa Fujimoto	Pin
Misaki Ohata	5:44
Tomoka Nakagawa	Pin
Hiroyo Matsumoto	5:10

Semifinals (July 27)
Yumi Ohka	Pin
Misaki Ohata	3:48
Tomoka Nakagawa	Pin
Hikaru Shida	6:26

Finals (July 27)
Misaki Ohata	Pin
Hikaru Shida	12:23

- July 27:
  - Third place four-way match:
    Tomoka Nakagawa defeated Hiroyo Matsumoto, Tsukasa Fujimoto and Yumi Ohka (6:17).
- Post-tournament awards:
  - Best Bout Award: Kyoko Kimura vs. Kyusei Sakura Hirota, May 13
  - Best Performance Award: Tsukasa Fujimoto led Ice Ribbon
  - Fighting Spirit Award: Kyusei Sakura Hirota
  - Outstanding Performance Award: Mika Iida
  - Technique Award: Kyusei Sakura Hirota

=== Catch the Young Wave ===
Concurrently to the 2014 Catch the Wave tournament, Pro Wrestling Wave also held the first Catch the Young Wave tournament, where six rookie wrestlers competed for a ¥500,000 main prize. Outside participants in the tournament included Risa Sera and Shiori Akiba from Ice Ribbon and Kaho Kobayashi from Wrestling New Classic (WNC)/Reina Joshi Puroresu. Akiba was forced to pull out of the tournament and forfeit her final two matches, after being sidelined as a result of headaches and memory impairment on June 18. The block ended in a four-way tie on June 27, leading to Wave announcing a single-elimination tournament between the four to determine the winner.

Final standings
Young
Fairy Nipponbashi	6
Kaho Kobayashi	6
Sumire Natsu	6
Risa Sera	6
Rina Yamashita	5
Shiori Akiba	1

Young	Fairy Nipponbashi	Kaho Kobayashi	Rina Yamashita	Risa Sera	Shiori Akiba	Sumire Natsu
Fairy Nipponbashi	X	Kobayashi (7:38)	Nipponbashi (5:52)	Nipponbashi (5:24)	Nipponbashi (forfeit)	Natsu (7:44)
Kaho Kobayashi	Kobayashi (7:38)	X	Yamashita (6:52)	Draw (10:00)	Draw (10:00)	Kobayashi (5:45)
Rina Yamashita	Nipponbashi (5:52)	Yamashita (6:52)	X	Draw (10:00)	Yamashita (5:13)	Natsu (9:12)
Risa Sera	Nipponbashi (5:24)	Draw (10:00)	Draw (10:00)	X	Sera (4:50)	Sera (5:00)
Shiori Akiba	Nipponbashi (forfeit)	Draw (10:00)	Yamashita (5:13)	Sera (4:50)	X	Natsu (forfeit)
Sumire Natsu	Natsu (7:44)	Kobayashi (5:45)	Natsu (9:12)	Sera (5:00)	Natsu (forfeit)	X

Semifinals (July 13)
Kaho Kobayashi	Pin
Risa Sera	6:53
Fairy Nipponbashi	Pin
Sumire Natsu	3:38

Finals (July 27)
Kaho Kobayashi	Pin
Sumire Natsu	8:30

== 2015 ==
The 2015 Catch the Wave took place between May 3 and July 20. The tournament featured a single round-robin block with ten wrestlers. The four previous still active winners; Yumi Ohka, Kana, Misaki Ohata and Hikaru Shida as well as the reigning Catch the Young Wave winner Kaho Kobayashi, earned automatic spots in the tournament. Gami picked one wrestler to enter the tournament, while the remaining four were decided in qualifying matches on April 4. Cherry, Kyusei Sakura Hirota, Mika Iida and Ryo Mizunami ended up earning their spots in the tournament in a nine-woman battle royal, while Rina Yamashita was chosen by Gami as the final entrant. In the tournament, instead of points, rankings were based on winning percentages or simply the number of wins. Two matches in the tournament took place at an Osaka Joshi Pro Wrestling event.

Final standings
Wrestler	Wins	Draws	Losses
Kana	5	3	1
Hikaru Shida	5	2	2
Mika Iida	5	1	3
Yumi Ohka	5	1	3
Cherry	4	1	4
Ryo Mizunami	4	1	4
Misaki Ohata	4	0	5
Kaho Kobayashi	3	0	6
Kyusei Sakura Hirota	3	0	6
Rina Yamashita	2	1	6

Results	Cherry	Shida	Kobayashi	Kana	Hirota	Iida	Ohata	Yamashita	Mizunami	Ohka
Cherry	X	Shida (8:06)	Cherry (6:36)	Draw (5:53)	Cherry (6:55)	Iida (5:00)	Ohata (4:20)	Cherry (5:36)	Mizunami (5:38)	Cherry (4:26)
Shida	Shida (8:06)	X	Shida (8:58)	Draw (15:00)	Hirota (5:22)	Draw (15:00)	Ohata (13:28)	Shida (10:01)	Shida (14:49)	Shida (13:37)
Kobayashi	Cherry (6:36)	Shida (8:58)	X	Kana (10:20)	Kobayashi (10:04)	Kobayashi (8:03)	Ohata (11:21)	Kobayashi (9:22)	Mizunami (5:48)	Ohka (7:51)
Kana	Draw (5:53)	Draw (15:00)	Kana (10:20)	X	Hirota (6:53)	Kana (10:23)	Kana (8:27)	Kana (9:42)	Kana (9:37)	Draw (15:00)
Hirota	Cherry (6:55)	Hirota (5:22)	Kobayashi (10:04)	Hirota (6:53)	X	Iida (8:39)	Hirota (10:03)	Yamashita (6:23)	Mizunami (13:12)	Ohka (5:50)
Iida	Iida (5:00)	Draw (15:00)	Kobayashi (8:03)	Kana (10:23)	Iida (8:39)	X	Iida (9:27)	Iida (7:16)	Iida (10:43)	Ohka (6:53)
Ohata	Ohata (4:20)	Ohata (13:28)	Ohata (11:21)	Kana (8:27)	Hirota (10:03)	Iida (9:27)	X	Ohata (7:15)	Mizunami (9:51)	Ohka (14:44)
Yamashita	Cherry (5:36)	Shida (10:01)	Kobayashi (9:22)	Kana (9:42)	Yamashita (6:23)	Iida (7:16)	Ohata (7:15)	X	Draw (15:00)	Yamashita (5:11)
Mizunami	Mizunami (5:38)	Shida (14:49)	Mizunami (5:48)	Kana (9:37)	Mizunami (13:12)	Iida (10:43)	Mizunami (9:51)	Draw (15:00)	X	Ohka (12:16)
Ohka	Cherry (4:26)	Shida (13:37)	Ohka (7:51)	Draw (15:00)	Ohka (5:50)	Ohka (6:53)	Ohka (14:44)	Yamashita (5:11)	Ohka (12:16)	X

Semifinals (July 20)
Hikaru Shida	Pin
Mika Iida	16:23
Kana	Pin
Yumi Ohka	9:52

Finals (July 20)
Mika Iida	Pin
Yumi Ohka	20:02

- Post-tournament awards:
  - Best Bout Award: Ryo Mizunami vs. Yumi Ohka, June 10
  - Best Performance Award: Wonderful World Fairy Family (Ayako Hamada, Chikayo Nagashima, Fairy Nipponbashi, Tsukasa Fujimoto, Yumi Ohka and Yuu Yamagata)
  - Fighting Spirit Award: Ryo Mizunami
  - Outstanding Performance Award: Mika Iida
  - Technique Award: Mika Iida
  - Raspberry Award: Kaho Kobayashi vs. Kyusei Sakura Hirota, June 14

=== Young Block Oh! Oh! 2015 ===
The rookie version of Catch the Wave started on May 29 with six participants, including five outsiders; Konami from Office Kana/Reina Joshi Puroresu, Maya Yukihi and Yuka from Ice Ribbon, Meiko Tanaka from World Woman Pro-Wrestling Diana and Yako Fujigasaki from JWP Joshi Puroresu. The tournament took place in a single-elimination format with Konami and Yuka earning automatic spots to in the semifinals. Matches had a ten-minute time limit in the tournament. In case of a time limit draw, the match would enter a five-minute overtime, where the match can be won with only a two-count. If the match again ended in a time limit draw, it would be restarted with no time limit in a match that can be won with only a one-count. The winner of the tournament would receive ¥500,000 and a shot at the JWP Junior and Princess of Pro-Wrestling Championships. Both of the tournament's finalists were injured before the final match with Meiko Tanaka dislocating her right elbow and Yuka suffering a cervical spinal cord contusion and subarachnoid hemorrhage. As Yuka was injured first, Wave originally awarded Tanaka the final with a bye, declaring her the winner of the tournament. However, on the final day of the tournament, Gami instead announced that they were postponing the final match until both wrestlers were able to return to the ring. The final eventually took place on October 30.

First round (May 29)
Hiroe Nagahama	Pin
Maya Yukihi	7:22
Meiko Tanaka	Pin
Yako Fujigasaki	4:34

Semifinals (June 26)
Hiroe Nagahama	Pin
Yuka	(Note: This match originally ended in a ten-minute time limit draw, leading to a five-minute overtime, which could be won with a two-count.)
Konami	Pin
Meiko Tanaka	7:38

Finals
Yuka	Pin
Meiko Tanaka	10:19

== 2016 ==
The 2016 Catch the Wave took place between April 10 and June 5. The tournament featured 32 wrestlers in eight blocks of four, making it the largest Catch the Wave tournament in history. In the tournament a win was worth two points and a loss none. In case of a draw, the wrestler who debuted at a later date would be awarded one point. The winners from each block would advance to a single-elimination tournament. If a block ended in a tie, a playoff match would determine the advancer.

Final standings
African Violet		Chrome Yellow		Italian Red		Mandarin Orange	
Rina Yamashita	4	Ryo Mizunami	4	Sareee	4	Dash Chisako	5
Hikaru Shida	3	Chikayo Nagashima	4	Hiroe Nagahama	3	Asuka	2
Kaho Kobayashi	2	Aoi Kizuki	2	Yumi Ohka	2	Hibiscus Mii	2
Kaori Yoneyama	2	Meiko Tanaka	1	Mayumi Ozaki	0	Yuki Miyazaki	2
Orion Blue		Pompadour Pink		Regatta Blue		Silver Gray	
Hanako Nakamori	4	Tsukasa Fujimoto	6	Mika Iida	4	Yoshiko	5
Misaki Ohata	3	Rabbit Miu	3	Melanie Cruise	4	Ayako Hamada	4
Makoto	2	Cherry	2	Tsukushi	4	Kagetsu	2
Yuka	1	Moeka Haruhi	0	Leon	0	Sawako Shimono	0

African Violet	Hikaru Shida	Kaho Kobayashi	Kaori Yoneyama	Rina Yamashita
Hikaru Shida	X	Shida (10:39)	Draw (15:00)	Yamashita (11:18)
Kaho Kobayashi	Shida (10:39)	X	Kobayashi (9:45)	Yamashita (11:14)
Kaori Yoneyama	Draw (15:00)	Kobayashi (9:45)	X	Yoneyama (4:25)
Rina Yamashita	Yamashita (11:18)	Yamashita (11:14)	Yoneyama (4:25)	X
Chrome Yellow	Aoi Kizuki	Chikayo Nagashima	Meiko Tanaka	Ryo Mizunami
Aoi Kizuki	X	Nagashima (8:40)	Draw (15:00)	Kizuki (2:59)
Chikayo Nagashima	Nagashima (8:40)	X	Nagashima (7:43)	Mizunami (8:57)
Meiko Tanaka	Draw (15:00)	Nagashima (7:43)	X	Mizunami (9:44)
Ryo Mizunami	Kizuki (2:59)	Mizunami (8:57)	Mizunami (9:44)	X
Italian Red	Hiroe Nagahama	Mayumi Ozaki	Sareee	Yumi Ohka
Hiroe Nagahama	X	Nagahama (11:43)	Sareee (9:56)	Draw (15:00)
Mayumi Ozaki	Nagahama (11:43)	X	Sareee (7:14)	NC
Sareee	Sareee (9:56)	Sareee (7:14)	X	Ohka (8:38)
Yumi Ohka	Draw (15:00)	NC	Ohka (8:38)	X
Mandarin Orange	Asuka	Dash Chisako	Hibiscus Mii	Yuki Miyazaki
Asuka	X	Chisako (10:32)	Asuka (11:00)	Miyazaki (10:21)
Dash Chisako	Chisako (10:32)	X	Chisako (8:50)	Draw (15:00)
Hibiscus Mii	Asuka (11:00)	Chisako (8:50)	X	Mii (7:31)
Yuki Miyazaki	Miyazaki (10:21)	Draw (15:00)	Mii (7:31)	X
Orion Blue	Hanako Nakamori	Makoto	Misaki Ohata	Yuka
Hanako Nakamori	X	Makoto (4:49)	Nakamori (7:56)	Nakamori (4:50)
Makoto	Makoto (4:49)	X	Draw (15:00)	Draw (15:00)
Misaki Ohata	Nakamori (7:56)	Draw (15:00)	X	Ohata (8:04)
Yuka	Nakamori (4:50)	Draw (15:00)	Ohata (8:04)	X
Pompadour Pink	Cherry	Moeka Haruhi	Rabbit Miu	Tsukasa Fujimoto
Cherry	X	Cherry (7:02)	Draw (8:01)	Fujimoto (3:56)
Moeka Haruhi	Cherry (7:02)	X	Miu (6:49)	Fujimoto (5:23)
Rabbit Miu	Draw (8:01)	Miu (6:49)	X	Fujimoto (10:11)
Tsukasa Fujimoto	Fujimoto (3:56)	Fujimoto (5:23)	Fujimoto (10:11)	X
Regatta Blue	Leon	Melanie Cruise	Mika Iida	Tsukushi
Leon	X	Cruise (forfeit)	Iida (5:43)	Tsukushi (forfeit)
Melanie Cruise	Cruise (forfeit)	X	Iida (8:47)	Cruise (8:01)
Mika Iida	Iida (5:43)	Iida (8:47)	X	Tsukushi (4:22)
Tsukushi	Tsukushi (forfeit)	Cruise (8:01)	Tsukushi (4:22)	X
Silver Gray	Ayako Hamada	Kagetsu	Sawako Shimono	Yoshiko
Ayako Hamada	X	Hamada (12:48)	Hamada (11:23)	Draw (9:58)
Kagetsu	Hamada (12:48)	X	Kagetsu (11:19)	Yoshiko (8:50)
Sawako Shimono	Hamada (11:23)	Kagetsu (11:19)	X	Yoshiko (14:22)
Yoshiko	Draw (9:58)	Yoshiko (8:50)	Yoshiko (14:22)	X

Playoff matches

- Ryo Mizunami defeated Chikayo Nagashima (12:50)
- Mika Iida defeated Melanie Cruise and Tsukushi (6:53)

First round (June 2)
Dash Chisako	Pin
Ryo Mizunami	16:12
Hanako Nakamori	Pin
Yoshiko	12:12
Mika Iida	Pin
Rina Yamashita	17:55
Sareee	Pin
Tsukasa Fujimoto	8:44

Semifinals (June 5)
Ryo Mizunami	Pin
Yoshiko	13:44
Rina Yamashita	Pin
Tsukasa Fujimoto	11:00

Finals (June 5)
Ryo Mizunami	Pin
Tsukasa Fujimoto	16:03

- Post-tournament awards:
  - Best Bout Award: Mika Iida vs. Tsukushi, May 3
  - Best Performance Award: Referee Ishiguro and Mayumi Ozaki
  - Fighting Spirit Award: Rabbit Miu
  - Outstanding Performance Award: Hiroe Nagahama

=== Young Block Oh! Oh! 2016 ===
The 2016 rookie version of Catch the Wave took place between February 6 and March 13 with eight participants in two blocks. Outside participants included Akane Fujita, Maruko Nagasaki and Yuka from Ice Ribbon, Konami from Reina Joshi Puroresu, Mari An from Sportiva and Yako Fujigasaki from JWP Joshi Puroresu. For the first time, the tournament ran before the main tournament. The winner of the tournament earned a spot in the 2016 Catch the Wave tournament. In the tournament, wins were worth two points and losses zero. In case of a time limit draw, the wrestler who debuted at a later date would be awarded one point. One of the matches in the tournament took place at an event held by Wave's sister promotion Osaka Joshi Pro Wrestling.

Final standings
A		B	
Hiroe Nagahama	6	Yuka	4
Akane Fujita	2	Konami	3
Sumire Natsu	2	Yako Fujigasaki	2
Mari An	2	Maruko Nagasaki	1

A	Akane Fujita	Hiroe Nagahama	Mari An	Sumire Natsu
Akane Fujita	X	Nagahama (5:50)	Fujita (6:23)	Natsu (8:34)
Hiroe Nagahama	Nagahama (5:50)	X	Nagahama (5:58)	Nagahama (4:34)
Mari An	Fujita (6:23)	Nagahama (5:58)	X	An (6:16)
Sumire Natsu	Natsu (8:34)	Nagahama (4:34)	An (6:16)	X
B	Konami	Maruko Nagasaki	Yako Fujigasaki	Yuka
Konami	X	Konami (6:17)	Draw (10:00)	Yuka (7:26)
Maruko Nagasaki	Konami (6:17)	X	Draw (10:00)	Yuka (8:31)
Yako Fujigasaki	Draw (10:00)	Draw (10:00)	X	Fujigasaki (7:46)
Yuka	Yuka (7:26)	Yuka (8:31)	Fujigasaki (7:46)	X

Final
A1	Hiroe Nagahama	Pin
B1	Yuka	10:04

== 2017 ==
The 2017 Catch the Wave took place between April 19 and June 4. The tournament featured eight wrestlers in two blocks of four, making it the smallest Catch the Wave tournament in history. The participants wrestled in a single block, but in point standings were divided into two blocks by their affiliation. Wrestlers signed to Pro Wrestling Wave, wrestled in the "Zabun" block, while outsiders wrestled in the "Other Than" block, which included Ice Ribbon representative Mochi Miyagi, Marvelous representative Rin Kadokura, Seadlinnng representative Sareee and freelancer Saki. In the tournament a win was worth two points, a draw one point and a loss none. The top two wrestlers from each block advanced to the semifinals.

Final standings
Zabun		Other Than	
Misaki Ohata	9	Sareee	9
Rina Yamashita	8	Rin Kadokura	7
Hiroe Nagahama	7	Mochi Miyagi	6
Moeka Haruhi	5	Saki	5

Results	Nagahama	Ohata	Miyagi	Haruhi	Kadokura	Yamashita	Saki	Sareee
Nagahama	X	Nagahama (8:33)	Miyagi (9:43)	Nagahama (9:22)	Draw (15:00)	Yamashita (9:42)	Nagahama (7:53)	Sareee (8:35)
Ohata	Nagahama (8:33)	X	Miyagi (13:53)	Ohata (12:20)	Draw (15:00)	Ohata (10:43)	Ohata (5:42)	Ohata (10:11)
Miyagi	Miyagi (9:43)	Miyagi (13:53)	X	Haruhi (11:32)	Draw (15:00)	Yamashita (5:46)	Saki (8:37)	Draw (15:00)
Haruhi	Nagahama (9:22)	Ohata (12:20)	Haruhi (11:32)	X	Draw (15:00)	Yamashita (9:54)	Haruhi (7:03)	Sareee (3:51)
Kadokura	Draw (15:00)	Draw (15:00)	Draw (15:00)	Draw (15:00)	X	Draw (15:00)	Draw (15:00)	Draw (15:00)
Yamashita	Yamashita (9:42)	Ohata (10:43)	Yamashita (5:46)	Yamashita (9:54)	Draw (15:00)	X	Saki (4:06)	Draw (15:00)
Saki	Nagahama (7:53)	Ohata (5:42)	Saki (8:37)	Haruhi (7:03)	Draw (15:00)	Saki (4:06)	X	Sareee (11:20)
Sareee	Sareee (8:35)	Ohata (10:11)	Draw (15:00)	Sareee (3:51)	Draw (15:00)	Draw (15:00)	Sareee (11:20)	X

Semifinals
Z1	Misaki Ohata	Pin
OT1	Sareee	3:31
Z2	Rina Yamashita	Pin
OT2	Rin Kadokura	15:19

Final
Misaki Ohata	Pin
Rina Yamashita	14:24

- Post-tournament awards:
  - Best Bout Award: Hiroe Nagahama vs. Misaki Ohata, May 23
  - Fighting Spirit Award: Rin Kadokura
  - Outstanding Performance Award: Hiroe Nagahama
  - Technique Award: Mochi Miyagi

== 2018 ==
The 2018 Catch the Wave took place between March 11 and May 4. The tournament featured twelve wrestlers in two blocks of six, the Crazy Block and the Violence Block. In the tournament a win was worth two points, a draw one point and a loss none. On April 7, Hikaru Shida announced she would be dropping out to receive surgery on a distal tibia fracture, forfeiting the rest of her matches. The top wrestler from each block was to advance to the finals, however both blocks ended in ties. Because Violence Block ended in a three-way tie, the tiebreaker was determined to be a gauntlet match where the first woman to win two consecutive falls would advance.

Final standings
Crazy Block		Violence Block	
Rina Yamashita	9	Ayako Hamada	7
Nagisa Nozaki	9	Arisa Nakajima	7
Ryo Mizunami	4	Misaki Ohata	7
Yumi Ohka	4	Hiroe Nagahama	5
Asuka	3	Mio Momono	2
Miyuki Takase	1	Hikaru Shida	2

Crazy Block	Asuka	Takase	Nozaki	Yamashita	Mizunami	Ohka
Asuka	X	Draw (15:00)	Nozaki (7:03)	Yamashita (9:32)	Asuka (3:15)	Ohka (12:14)
Takase	Draw (15:00)	X	Nozaki (8:03)	Yamashita (11:04)	Mizunami (8:58)	Ohka (7:43)
Nozaki	Nozaki (7:03)	Nozaki (8:03)	X	Draw (15:00)	Nozaki (9:23)	Nozaki (13:07)
Yamashita	Yamashita (9:32)	Yamashita (11:04)	Draw (15:00)	X	Yamashita (13:18)	Yamashita (12:19)
Mizunami	Asuka (3:15)	Mizunami (8:58)	Nozaki (9:23)	Yamashita (13:18)	X	Mizunami (12:40)
Ohka	Ohka (12:14)	Ohka (7:43)	Nozaki (13:07)	Yamashita (12:19)	Mizunami (12:40)	X
Violence Block	Nakajima	Hamada	Shida	Nagahima	Momono	Ohata
Nakajima	X	Hamada (12:52)	Nakajima (forfeit)	Nakajima (12:24)	Nakajima (forfeit)	Draw (15:00)
Hamada	Hamada (12:52)	X	Hamada (forfeit)	Draw (15:00)	Hamada (12:26)	Ohata (11:57)
Shida	Nakajima (forfeit)	Hamada (forfeit)	X	Shida (9:35)	Momono (7:00)	Ohata (9:13)
Nagahima	Nakajima (12:24)	Draw (15:00)	Shida (9:35)	X	Nagahima (10:15)	Nagahima (12:54)
Momono	Nakajima (forfeit)	Hamada (12:26)	Momono (7:00)	Nagahima (10:15)	X	Ohata (11:13)
Ohata	Draw (15:00)	Ohata (11:57)	Ohata (9:13)	Nagahima (12:54)	Ohata (11:13)	X

Tiebreakers

Final

C1
Nagisa Nozaki
Pin

C2
Rina Yamashita
17:49

Rina Yamashita
Pin

Ayako Hamada
20:48

V1 V2
Arisa Nakajima

Misaki Ohata

Falls (1-1-3)

V3
Ayako Hamada
15:19

- Post-tournament awards:
  - Best Bout Award: Misaki Ohata vs. Hikaru Shida, March 23
  - Fighting Spirit Award: Mio Momono & Miyuki Takase (Reason: Teamed with the competitors during multi-person tag matches.)
  - Outstanding Performance Award: Yuki Miyazaki & Sakura Hirota (Reason: Did their best in a tough block without getting injured.)
  - Technique Award: Asuka (Reason: Worked through a broken ankle for the entire tournament.)
  - Special Prize: Hiroe Nagahama (Reason: Defeated the Regina di WAVE Champion Misaki Ohata in a surprise upset.)

== 2019 ==
The 2019 Catch the Wave took place between May 5 and July 15. The tournament featured sixteen wrestlers in four blocks of four, the Power Block, the Technical Block, the Visual Block and the Young Block. With the Wave Single Championship being vacated due to the last champion Misaki Ohata's retirement from professional wrestling, the winner of the tournament would win the vacant title as well. The Young Block competed independently of the main tournament. Mika Iwata was injured on June, therefore, was out of the tournament.

Final standings
Power Block		Technical Block		Visual Block		Young Block	
Ryo Mizunami	4	Takumi Iroha	2	Nagisa Nozaki	5	Hiro'e	6
Miyuki Takase	2	Mika Iwata	2	Hikaru Shida	3	Haruka Umesaki	2
Yuu	2	Rin Kadokura	2	Yumi Ohka	3	Ibuki Hoshi	2
Yuki Miyazaki	0	Sakura Hirota	2	Himeka Arita	1	Maria	2

Power Block	Takase	Mizunami	Miyazaki	Yuu
Takase	X	Mizunami (12:05)	Draw (15:00)	Takase (5:33)
Mizunami	Mizunami (12:05)	X	Miyazaki (11:08)	Mizunami (12:33)
Miyazaki	Takase (5:33)	Miyazaki (11:08)	X	Yuu (5:14)
Yuu	Takase (5:33)	Mizunami (12:33)	Yuu (5:14)	X
Technical Block	Iroha	Iwata	Kadokura	Hirota
Iroha	X		Iroha (13:50)	Hirota (14:16)
Iwata	X			Iwata (4:49)
Kadokura	Iroha (13:50)	X		Kadokura (13:28)
Hirota	Hirota (14:16)	Iwata (4:49)	Kadokura (13:28)	X
Visual Block	Nozaki	Shida	Ohka	Arita
Nozaki	X	Draw (15:00)	Nozaki (12:40)	Nozaki (7:53)
Shida	Draw (15:00)	X	Ohka (12:05)	Shida (7:25)
Ohka	Nozaki (12:40)	Ohka (12:05)	X	Draw (15:00)
Arita	Nozaki (7:53)	Shida (7:25)	Draw (15:00)	X
Young Block	Hiro'e	Umesaki	Hoshi	Maria
Hiro'e	X	Hiro'e (9:58)	Hiro'e (7:44)	Hiro'e (N/A)
Umesaki	Hiro'e (9:58)	X	Hoshi (8:52)	Umesaki (5:54)
Hoshi	Hiro'e (7:44)	Hoshi (8:52)	X	Maria (8:53)
Maria	Hiro'e (N/A)	Umesaki (5:54)	Maria (8:53)	X

Final
T1	Takumi Iroha	32:18
P1 V1	Ryo Mizunami Nagisa Nozaki	Falls (3–2–2)

== 2021 ==
The 2021 Catch the Wave took place between June 1 and July 1. The tournament featured sixteen wrestlers in four blocks of four, the Compliance Block, the Gatling Block, the Jealousy Block and the Potential Block. The winner will be given an opportunity to challenge for the Wave Single Championship.

Final standings
Compliance Block		Gatling Block		Jealousy Block		Potential Block	
Rin Kadokura	5	Nagisa Nozaki	5	Kaori Yoneyama	4	Miyuki Takase	2
Yuki Miyazaki	3	Saki	3	Tomoko Watanabe	3	Mio Momono	2
Haruka Umesaki	2	Itsuki Aoki	2	Yumi Ohka	3	Sakura Hirota	2
Hibiscus Mii	2	Yuu	2	Yako	2	Tomoka Inaba	2

Compliance Block	Kadokura	Mii	Miyazaki	Umesaki
Kadokura	X	Kadokura (8:57)	Draw (15:00)	Kadokura (4:21)
Mii	Kadokura (8:57)	X	Miyazaki (10:21)	Mii (9:54)
Miyazaki	Draw (15:00)	Miyazaki (10:21)	X	Umesaki (10:23)
Umesaki	Kadokura (4:21)	Mii (9:54)	Umesaki (10:23)	X
Gatling Block	Nozaki	Aoki	Saki	Yuu
Nozaki	X	Draw (15:00)	Nozaki (10:23)	Nozaki (10:05)
Aoki	Draw (15:00)	X	Draw (15:00)	Yuu (4:16)
Saki	Nozaki (10:23)	Draw (15:00)	X	Saki (6:49)
Yuu	Nozaki (10:05)	Yuu (4:16)	Saki (6:49)	X
Jealousy Block	Ohka	Watanabe	Yako	Yoneyama
Ohka	X	Ohka (8:24)	Yako (6:54)	Draw (15:00)
Watanabe	Ohka (8:24)	X	Watanabe (11:06)	Draw (15:00)
Yako	Yako (6:54)	Watanabe (11:06)	X	Yoneyama (4:01)
Yoneyama	Draw (15:00)	Draw (15:00)	Yoneyama (4:01)	X
Potential Block	Hirota	Inaba	Momono	Takase
Hirota	X	Inaba (2:22)	Hirota (11:58)	Takase (14:52)
Inaba	Inaba (2:22)	X		
Momono	Hirota (11:58)	X		Momono (14:54)
Takase	Takase (14:52)	X	Momono (14:54)	X

Semifinals
P1	Miyuki Takase	Pin
G1	Nagisa Nozaki	14:58
C1	Rin Kadokura	Pin
J1	Kaori Yoneyama	2:45

Final
Miyuki Takase	Pin
Rin Kadokura	13:26

- Post-tournament awards:
  - Best Bout Award: Tomoko Watanabe vs. Yako, June 8
  - Distinguished Service Award: Mio Momono
  - Fighting Spirit Award: Mio Momono
  - Outstanding Performance Award: Hibiscus Mii

=== Young Block Oh! Oh! 2021 ===
The 2021 Young Block tournament took place beginning with May 18 and culminated on May 28.

Final standings
Block A		Block B	
Tomoka Inaba	5	Chie Ozora	4
Ami Miura	5	Sumika Yanagawa	3
Momo Kohgo	2	Waka Tsukiyama	3
Shizuku Tsukata	1	Yappy	3

Block A	Miura	Kohgo	Tsukata	Inaba
Miura	X	Draw (2–2)	Miura (2–0)	Draw (1–1)
Kohgo	Draw (2–2)	X	Houzan (2–1)†	Inaba (1–0)
Tsukata	Miura (2–0)	Houzan (2–1)†	X	Inaba (3–0)
Inaba	Draw (1–1)	Inaba (1–0)	Inaba (3–0)	X
Block B	Ozora	Yanagawa	Tsukiyama	Yappy
Ozora	X	Ozora (2–1)	Ozora (2–1)	Draw (0–0)
Yanagawa	Ozora (2–1)	X	Draw (1–1)	Draw (1–1)
Tsukiyama	Ozora (2–1)	Draw (1–1)	X	Yappy (2–1)
Yappy	Draw (0–0)	Draw (1–1)	Yappy (2–1)	X

Block A Decision			Final
			A1	Tomoka Inaba	Pin
A1	Tomoka Inaba	Pin	B1	Chie Ozora	11:24
A2	Ami Miura	3:43

†Tsukata faced Ai Houzan, who was filling in for Momo Kohgo.

== 2022 ==
The 2022 edition of the tournament took place between May 5 and July 17, 2022.

=== Qualifier Blocks ===
Final standings
Kick Block		Hardcore Block		Comic Block		Future Block		Strong Arm Block	
Nagisa Nozaki	4	Yuki Miyazaki	5	Kaori Yoneyama	3	Suzu Suzuki	6	Itsuki Aoki	4
Hanako Nakamori	4	Risa Sera	5	Miyako Matsumoto	3	Haruka Umesaki	4	Miyuki Takase	3
Hikari Shimizu	3	Saki	2	Hibiscus Mii	3	Kohaku	4	Yuu	3
Sae	1	Yumi Ohka	0	Sakura Hirota	2	Riko Kawahata	4	Ayame Sasamura	2
						Chie Ozora	2		

Kick Block	Nozaki	Nakamori	Shimizu	Sae
Nozaki	—N/a	Nakamori (9:09)	Nozaki (9:03)	Nozaki (13:34)
Nakamori	Nakamori (9:09)	—N/a	Draw (15:00)	Draw (15:00)
Shimizu	Nozaki (9:03)	Draw (15:00)	—N/a	Shimizu (9:48)
Sae	Nozaki (13:34)	Draw (15:00)	Shimizu (9:48)	—N/a

Hardcore Block	Miyazaki	Sera	Saki	Ohka
Miyazaki	—N/a	Draw (15:00)	Miyazaki (12:33)	
Sera	Draw (15:00)	—N/a	Sera (13:20)	
Saki	Miyazaki (12:33)	Sera (13:20)	—N/a	Saki (12:12)
Ohka			Saki (12:12)	—N/a

Comic Block	Yoneyama	Matsumoto	Mii	Hirota
Yoneyama	—N/a	Draw (7:49)	Draw (8:52)	
Matsumoto	Draw (7:49)	—N/a	Draw (13:40)	Draw (15:00)
Mii	Draw (8:52)	Draw (13:40)	—N/a	Draw (15:00)
Hirota		Draw (15:00)	Draw (15:00)	—N/a

Future Block	Umesaki	Suzuki	Kawahata	Kohaku	Ozora
Umesaki	—N/a	Draw (15:00)	Draw (15:00)	Kohaku (8:54)	Umesaki (8:47)
Suzuki	Draw (15:00)	—N/a	Suzuki (13:08)	Draw (10:00)	Suzuki (9:14)
Kawahata	Draw (15:00)	Suzuki (13:08)	—N/a	Draw (15:00)	Kawahata (9:39)
Kohaku	Kohaku (8:54)	Draw (10:00)	Draw (15:00)	—N/a	Ozora (11:07)
Ozora	Umesaki (8:47)	Suzuki (9:14)	Kawahata (9:39)	Ozora (11:07)	—N/a

Strong Arm Block	Aoki	Takase	Yuu	Sasamura
Aoki	—N/a	Aoki (7:09)	Aoki (8:41)	Sasamura (12:59)
Takase	Aoki (7:09)	—N/a	Draw (15:00)	Takase (10:17)
Yuu	Aoki (8:41)	Draw (15:00)	—N/a	Yuu (6:31)
Sasamura	Sasamura (12:59)	Takase (10:17)	Yuu (6:31)	—N/a

Due to certain point ties from the qualifier blocks, there have been a couple of decision matches which took place on June 22 to determine the wrestlers who have further qualified in the final blocks.

No.	Results	Stipulations	Times
1	Nagisa Nozaki defeated Hanako Nakamori	Singles match for the first place of the Kick Block	12:02
2	Kaori Yoneyama defeated Hibiscus Mii, Miyako Matsumoto and Sakura Hirota	Four-way match for the first place of the Comic Block	2:41
3	Haruka Umesaki, Hikari Shimizu and Saki won by last eliminating Ayame Sasamura	14-woman second chance battle royal (Note: Only three of the participants would be resurrected in the tournament. The other participants were Chie Ozora, Hanako Nakamori, Hibiscus Mii, Kohaku, Miyako Matsumoto, Miyuki Takase, Riko Kawahata, Sae, Sakura Hirota, Yuu.)	—

=== Winner Blocks ===
Due to Nagisa Nozaki being one of the finalists of the tournament, the final match was also disputed for her Wave Single Championship and will take place on July 17.

Final standings
Winner Block A		Winner Block B	
Nagisa Nozaki	4	Suzu Suzuki	4
Risa Sera	2	Haruka Umesaki	2
Saki	2	Hikari Shimizu	2
Kaori Yoneyama	2	Itsuki Aoki	2

Winner Block A	Saki	Yoneyama	Nozaki	Sera
Saki	—N/a	Saki (5:19)	Nozaki (13:00)	Draw (15:00)
Yoneyama	Saki (5:19)	—N/a	Nozaki (8:20)	Yoneyama (2:09)
Nozaki	Nozaki (13:00)	Nozaki (8:20)	—N/a	Sera (12:49)
Sera	Draw (15:00)	Yoneyama (2:09)	Sera (12:49)	—N/a
Winner Block B	Umesaki	Suzuki	Aoki	Shimizu
Umesaki	—N/a	Umesaki (10:48)	Draw (15:00)	Shimizu (9:57)
Suzuki	Umesaki (10:48)	—N/a	Suzuki (13:20)	Suzuki (13:10)
Aoki	Draw (15:00)	Suzuki (13:20)	—N/a	Aoki (12:00)
Shimizu	Shimizu (9:57)	Suzuki (13:10)	Aoki (12:00)	—N/a

Finals (July 17)
A1	Miyuki Takase (Note: Nagisa Nozaki was initially scheduled to face Suzuki but pulled out due to injury. She vacated the Wave Singles Championship in the process.)	18:15
B1	Suzu Suzuki	Pin

== 2023 ==
The 2023 edition of the tournament took place between May 4 and July 17, 2023.

Final standings
Young Block		Elizabeth Block		Block A		Block B		Block C	
Chie Ozora	7	Yuki Miyazaki	8	Asuka	8	Saki	6	Haruka Umesaki	5
Yura Suzuki	5	Mizuki Endo	4	Hiragi Kurumi	5	Risa Sera	6	Hikari Shimizu	5
Himiko	4	Kaori Yoneyama	4	Kohaku	3	Miyuki Takase	4	Itsuki Aoki	5
Honoka	3	Cherry	4	Manami	3	Kakeru Sekiguchi	2	Ayame Sasamura	4
Kizuna Tanaka	1	Sakura Hirota	2	Rina Amikura	1	Riko Kawahata	2	Yuko Sakurai	1

Young Block	Tanaka	Ozora	Suzuki	Himiko	Honoka
Tanaka	—N/a	Draw (10:00)	Suzuki (6:27)	Himiko (8:02)	Honoka (7:39)
Ozora	Draw (10:00)	—N/a	Ozora (8:17)	Ozora (8:04)	Ozora (N/A)
Suzuki	Suzuki (6:27)	Ozora (8:17)	—N/a	Suzuki (8:21)	Draw (10:00)
Himiko	Himiko (8:02)	Ozora (8:04)	Suzuki (8:21)	—N/a	Himiko (6:46)
Honoka	Honoka (7:39)	Ozora (N/A)	Draw (10:00)	Himiko (6:46)	—N/a
Elizabeth Block	Cherry	Miyazaki	Hirota	Endo	Yoneyama
Cherry	—N/a	Miyazaki (12:46)	Cherry (12:43)	Endo (5:55)	Yoneyama (10:07)
Miyazaki	Miyazaki (12:46)	—N/a	Miyazaki (12:06)	Miyazaki (10:31)	Miyazaki (3:22)
Hirota	Cherry (12:43)	Miyazaki (12:06)	—N/a	Endo (12:47)	Hirota (7:53)
Endo	Endo (5:55)	Miyazaki (10:31)	Endo (12:47)	—N/a	Yoneyama (4:04)
Yoneyama	Yoneyama (10:07)	Miyazaki (3:22)	Hirota (7:53)	Yoneyama (4:04)	—N/a
Block A	Asuka	Amikura	Kohaku	Manami	Kurumi
Asuka	—N/a	Asuka (8:58)	Asuka (14:12)	Asuka (6:04)	Asuka (6:26)
Amikura	Asuka (8:58)	—N/a	Draw (15:00)	Manami (6:24)	Kurumi (8:46)
Kohaku	Asuka (14:12)	Draw (15:00)	—N/a	Draw (15:00)	Draw (15:00)
Manami	Asuka (6:04)	Manami (6:24)	Draw (15:00)	—N/a	Kurumi (8:16)
Kurumi	Asuka (6:26)	Kurumi (8:46)	Draw (15:00)	Kurumi (8:16)	—N/a
Block B	Saki	Sekiguchi	Takase	Kawahata	Sera
Saki	—N/a	Saki (9:24)	Saki (12:48)	Saki (13:07)	Sera (10:39)
Sekiguchi	Saki (9:24)	—N/a	Sekiguchi (10:31)	Kawahata (11:32)	Sera (7:31)
Takase	Saki (12:48)	Sekiguchi (10:31)	—N/a	Takase (9:57)	Takase (7:16)
Kawahata	Saki (13:07)	Kawahata (11:32)	Takase (9:57)	—N/a	Sera (5:48)
Sera	Sera (10:39)	Sera (7:31)	Takase (7:16)	Sera (5:48)	—N/a
Block C	Umesaki	Shimizu	Sasamura	Aoki	Sakurai
Umesaki	—N/a	Umesaki (9:53)	Sasamura (10:09)	Draw (15:00)	Umesaki (9:09)
Shimizu	Umesaki (9:53)	—N/a	Draw (15:00)	Shimizu (2:57)	Shimizu (8:20)
Sasamura	Sasamura (10:09)	Draw (15:00)	—N/a	Aoki (9:51)	Draw (9:32)
Aoki	Draw (15:00)	Shimizu (2:57)	Aoki (9:51)	—N/a	Aoki (12:59)
Sakurai	Umesaki (9:09)	Shimizu (8:20)	Draw (9:32)	Aoki (12:59)	—N/a

=== Winner tournament ===
First round (July 3)
Itsuki Aoki (Note: Itsuki Aoki, Kizuna Tanaka and Kohaku won a "second chance" battle royal to get ressurected in the tournament despite occupying non-finalist positions in their respective blocks.)	Pin
Chie Ozora	7:31
Saki	Pin
Kizuna Tanaka	11:46
Yuki Miyazaki	Pin
Kohaku	6:49
Asuka	Pin
Haruka Umesaki	8:55

Semifinals
Itsuki Aoki	Pin
Saki	16:46
Yuki Miyazaki	Pin
Asuka	8:57

Finals (July 17)
Saki	Pin
Asuka	11:36

== 2024 ==
The 2024 edition of the tournament took place between May 5 and July 14, 2024.

=== Blocks ===
Final standings
Block A		Block B		Block C		Lucha Block		Elizabeth Block (Note: All the matches of the Elizabeth Block were contested under three-way rules, which involved the presence of the World Woman Pro-Wrestling Diana Queen Elizabeth Championship in the competition, with the reigning champion complementarily defending the title in their block matches. The point system saw 1 point awarded for a victory and -1 points for a defeat (subtracted from the total of accumulated points until loss). When one of the wrestlers reached -3 points, they would automatically be disqualified from the tournament. Chikayo Nagashima, Tsubasa Kuragaki, Kazuki, Kaoru Ito, and La Amapola were guest competitors in the block but didn't compete in the tournament. The winner of the block did not advance further in the competition.)	
Saya Kamitani	4	Haruka Umesaki	4	Itsuki Aoki	4	Kohaku	4	Sakura Hirota	0
Risa Sera	4	Maika Ozaki	3	Kakeru Sekiguchi	3	Tae Honma	4	Yuki Miyazaki	1
Yuko Sakurai	2	Saki	3	Ayame Sasamura	3	Dark Silueta	2	Himiko	0
Nanami	2	Momoka Hanazono	2	Sae	3	Ancham	2	Cherry	-2
								Kaori Yoneyama	-2

Block A	Sera	Kamitani	Sakurai	Nanami
Sera	—N/a	Sera (13:20)	Sakurai (6:39)	Sera (14:26)
Kamitani	Sera (13:20)	—N/a	Kamitani (10:40)	Kamitani (8:33)
Sakurai	Sakurai (6:39)	Kamitani (10:40)	—N/a	Nanami (11:12)
Nanami	Sera (14:26)	Kamitani (8:33)	Nanami (11:12)	—N/a
Block B	Saki	Ozaki	Hanazono	Umesaki
Saki	—N/a	DCO (4:45)	Saki (5:12)	Umesaki (11:34)
Ozaki	DCO (4:45)	—N/a	Ozaki (8:22)	Umesaki (7:15)
Hanazono	Saki (5:12)	Ozaki (8:22)	—N/a	Hanazono (10:06)
Umesaki	Umesaki (11:34)	Umesaki (7:15)	Hanazono (10:06)	—N/a
Block C	Aoki	Sasamura	Sekiguchi	Sae
Aoki	—N/a	Sasamura (13:56)	Aoki (11:49)	Draw (15:00)
Sasamura	Sasamura (13:56)	—N/a	Sekiguchi (12:19)	DCO (10:14)
Sekiguchi	Aoki (11:49)	Sekiguchi (12:19)	—N/a	DCO (11:30)
Sae	Draw (15:00)	DCO (10:14)	DCO (11:30)	—N/a
Lucha Block	Kohaku	Silueta	Honma	Ancham
Kohaku	—N/a	Kohaku (12:15)	Kohaku (4:40)	Ancham (10:00)
Silueta	Kohaku (12:15)	—N/a	Honma (13:01)	Silueta (9:08)
Honma	Kohaku (4:40)	Honma (13:01)	—N/a	Honma (9:07)
Ancham	Ancham (10:00)	Silueta (9:08)	Honma (9:07)	—N/a

Elizabeth Block
No.	Results	Stipulations	Times
1	Chikayo Nagashima defeated Cherry and Sakura Hirota (c)	Three-way match for the World Woman Pro-Wrestling Diana Queen Elizabeth Championship, Elizabeth Block match Night 1 (May 5)	11:02
2	Yuka Miyazaki defeated Kaori Yoneyama and Sakura Hirota	Three-way match, Elizabeth Block match Night 2 (May 6)	12:10
3	Cherry defeated Yuka Miyazaki and Himiko	Three-way match, Elizabeth Block match Night 3 (May 12)	8:57
4	Sakura Hirota defeated Cherry and Yuka Miyazaki	Three-way match, Elizabeth Block match Night 4 (May 18)	10:55
5	Yuka Miyazaki defeated Sakura Hirota and Himiko	Three-way match, Elizabeth Block match Night 5 (May 19)	13:19
6	Himiko defeated Cherry and Yuka Miyazaki by countout	Three-way match, Elizabeth Block match Night 6 (May 25)	12:49
7	Tsubasa Kuragaki defeated Kaori Yoneyama and Himiko	Three-way match, Elizabeth Block match Night 7 (May 26)	6:58
8	Cherry vs. Sakura Hirota vs. Kazuki ended in a time limit draw	Three-way match, Elizabeth Block match Night 8 (June 2)	15:00
9	Himiko defeated Kaori Yoneyama and Cherry by countout	Three-way match, Elizabeth Block match Night 9 (June 7)	7:01
10	Yuki Miyazaki defeated Chikayo Nagashima (c) and Sakura Hirota	Three-way match for the World Woman Pro-Wrestling Diana Queen Elizabeth Championship, Elizabeth Block match Night 9 (June 7)	13:01
11	Sakura Hirota defeated Kaori Yoneyama and La Amapola	Three-way match, Elizabeth Block match Night 10 (June 15)	11:30
12	Cherry vs. Sakura Hirota vs. Kaoru Ito ended in a draw	Three-way match, Elizabeth Block match Night 12 (June 23)	12:52
13	Sakura Hirota defeated Cherry and Kaori Yoneyama	Three-way match, Elizabeth Block match Night 13 (July 3)	7:24
14	Yuka Miyazaki (c) defeated Sakura Hirota and Himiko	Three-way match for the World Woman Pro-Wrestling Diana Queen Elizabeth Championship, Elizabeth Block match Night 14 (July 14)	14:02
(c) / – the champion(s) heading into the match

=== Winner tournament ===
Tie breakers (July 3)
L1	Kohaku	Pin
L2	Tae Honma	8:14
C1	Itsuki Aoki	Pin
C2	Kakeru Sekiguchi; Ayame Sasamura; Sae	12:18
A1	Saya Kamitani	Pin
A2	Risa Sera	17:25

Semifinals (July 14)
L1	Kohaku	Pin
B1	Haruka Umesaki	6:18
C1	Itsuki Aoki	13:56
A1	Saya Kamitani	Pin

Finals (July 14)
L1	Kohaku	13:42
A1	Saya Kamitani	Pin

=== Young Block 2024 ===
Final standings
Block A		Block B	
Honoka	4	Ranna Yagami	5
Yuna	3	ChiChi	5
Sya	3	Riara	1
Yuzuki	2	Mizuki Kato	1

Block A	Honoka	Sya	Yuna	Yuzuki
Honoka	—N/a	Sya (6:45)	Honoka (5:11)	Honoka (8:05)
Sya	Sya (6:45)	—N/a	Yuna (7:09)	Draw (10:00)
Yuna	Honoka (5:11)	Yuna (7:09)	—N/a	Draw (10:00)
Yuzuki	Honoka (8:05)	Draw (10:00)	Draw (10:00)	—N/a
Block B	ChiChi	Kato	Yagami	Riara
ChiChi	—N/a	ChiChi (9:41)	Draw (10:00)	ChiChi (6:40)
Kato	ChiChi (9:41)	—N/a	Yagami (8:30)	Draw (10:00)
Yagami	Draw (10:00)	Yagami (8:30)	—N/a	Yagami (6:37)
Riara	ChiChi (6:40)	Draw (10:00)		—N/a

Block B Decision (July 3)			Final (July 14)
			A1	Honoka	Pin
B1	Ranna Yagami	Pin	B1	Ranna Yagami	13:33
B2	ChiChi	10:46

== 2025 ==
The 2025 edition of the tournament took place between May 4 and July 21, 2025, and also featured wrestlers from World Wonder Ring Stardom. The tournament was the biggest to date, featuring 36 participants divided into nine different blocks.

=== Blocks ===
Final standings
Mercury		Venus		Earth		Mars		Jupiter		Saturn		Uranus		Neptune		Pluto	
Hazuki	8	Haruka Umesaki (Note: Defeated Kaho Kobayashi and Natsu Sumire in a tie breaker match at WAVE Osaka Rhapsody Vol. 65 ~ ZEN ~ on July 13, 2025.)	5	Kohaku	6	Momoka Hanazono (Note: Defeated Unagi Sayaka and Yumi Ohka in a tie breaker match at WAVE Osaka Rhapsody Vol. 65 ~ ZEN ~ on July 13, 2025.)	6	Saki	9	Ranna Yagami	6	Itsuki Aoki	6	Yuuri	6	Ayame Sasamura	7
Yuki Miyazaki	7	Kaho Kobayashi	5	Mizuki Kato	5	Unagi Sayaka	6	Maika Ozaki	6	Yura Suzuki	4	Kakeru Sekiguchi	5	Saran	5	Marika Kobashi	6
Nanami Hatano	2	Shin Sakura Hirota	3	Risa Sera	4	Yumi Ohka	6	Honoka	2	Tae Honma	4	Mari Manji	5	Cherry	4	Kaori Yoneyama	5
Rina Amikura	1	Sumire Natsu	3	Mio Shirai	3	Yuma Makoto	0	Yuki Mashiro	1	Miyuki Takase	4	Akira Kurogane	2	Yuko Sakurai	4	Asuka Goda	0

Mercury	Hazuki	Miyazaki	Nanami	Amikura
Hazuki	—N/a	Draw (15:00)	Hazuki (9:26)	Hazuki (8:42)
Miyazaki	Draw (15:00)	—N/a	Miyazaki (13:57)	Miyazaki (2:46)
Hatano	Hazuki (9:26)	Miyazaki (13:57)	—N/a	Draw (15:00)
Amikura	Hazuki (8:42)	Miyazaki (2:46)	Draw (15:00)	—N/a
Venus	Hirota	Umesaki	Natsu	Kobayashi
Hirota	—N/a	Umesaki (8:12)	Hirota (0:02)	Kobayashi (8:49)
Umesaki	Umesaki (8:12)	—N/a	Natsu (7:20)	Draw (15:00)
Natsu	Hirota (0:02)	Natsu (7:20)	—N/a	Draw (15:00)
Kobayashi	Kobayashi (8:49)	Draw (15:00)	Draw (15:00)	—N/a
Earth	Sera	Shirai	Kato	Kohaku
Sera	—N/a	Shirai (7:29)	DCO (10:43)	Sera (1:52)
Shirai	Shirai (7:29)	—N/a	Kato (5:19)	Kohaku (10:08)
Kato	DCO (10:43)	Kato (5:19)	—N/a	Kohaku (14:25)
Kohaku	Sera (1:52)	Kohaku (10:08)	Kohaku (14:25)	—N/a
Mars	Hanazono	Sayaka	Ohka	Makoto
Hanazono	—N/a	Sayaka (8:42)	Hanazono (13:58)	Hanazono (8:58)
Sayaka	Sayaka (8:42)	—N/a	Ohka (10:23)	Sayaka (Forfeit)
Ohka	Hanazono (13:58)	Ohka (10:23)	—N/a	Ohka (Forfeit)
Makoto	Hanazono (8:58)	Sayaka (Forfeit)	Ohka (Forfeit)	—N/a
Jupiter	Saki	Honoka	Mashiro	Ozaki
Saki	—N/a	Saki (12:19)	Saki (2:45)	Saki (14:23)
Honoka	Saki (12:19)	—N/a	Draw (15:00)	Ozaki (8:45)
Mashiro	Saki (2:45)	Draw (15:00)	—N/a	Ozaki (6:36)
Ozaki	Saki (14:23)	Ozaki (8:45)	Ozaki (6:36)	—N/a
Saturn	Yagami	Honma	Takase	Suzuki
Yagami	—N/a	Honma (2:42)	Yagami (9:13)	Yagami (11:32)
Honma	Honma (2:42)	—N/a	Takase (12:15)	Draw (6:40)
Takase	Yagami (9:13)	Takase (12:15)	—N/a	DCO (10:52)
Suzuki	Yagami (11:32)	Draw (6:40)	DCO (10:52)	—N/a
Uranus	Aoki	Kurogane	Sekiguchi	Manji
Aoki	—N/a	Aoki (11:32)	Sekiguchi (1:49)	Aoki (8:13)
Kurogane	Aoki (11:32)	—N/a	DCO (8:36)	Manji (9:46)
Sekiguchi	Sekiguchi (1:49)	DCO (8:36)	—N/a	Draw (8:33)
Manji	Aoki (8:13)	Manji (9:46)	Draw (8:33)	—N/a
Neptune	Sakurai	Cherry	Yuuri	Saran
Sakurai	—N/a	Sakurai (10:09)	Draw (15:00)	Saran (12:01)
Cherry	Sakurai (10:09)	—N/a	Yuuri (4:48)	Cherry (2:14)
Yuuri	Draw (15:00)	Yuuri (4:48)	—N/a	Draw (15:00)
Saran	Saran (12:01)	Cherry (2:14)	Draw (15:00)	—N/a
Pluto	Goda	Yoneyama	Sasamura	Kobashi
Goda	—N/a	Yoneyama (2:05)	Sasamura (11:09)	Kobashi (8:37)
Yoneyama	Yoneyama (2:05)	—N/a	Draw (15:00)	DCO (5:48)
Sasamura	Sasamura (11:09)	Draw (15:00)	—N/a	Draw (15:00)
Kobashi	Kobashi (8:37)	DCO (5:48)	Draw (15:00)	—N/a

=== Decision matches ===
July 13
No.	Results	Stipulations	Times
1	Haruka Umesaki defeated Kaho Kobayashi and Sumire Natsu	Three-way match, Venus Block Decision match	11:19
2	Momoka Hanazono defeated Unagi Sayaka and Yumi Ohka	Three-way match, Mars Block Decision match	15:27

=== Winner tournament ===
Semifinals (July 13)
Mars	Momoka Hanazono	15:47
Saturn	Ranna Yagami	Pin
Neptune	Yuuri	–
Venus	Haruka Umesaki	Pin
Jupiter	Saki	21:56
Uranus	Itsuki Aoki	–
Mercury	Hazuki	27:34
Earth	Kohaku	Pin
Pluto	Ayame Sasamura	–

Finals (July 21)
Saturn	Ranna Yagami	–
Venus	Haruka Umesaki	26:19
Earth	Kohaku	Pin

== 2026 ==
The 2026 edition of the tournament will take place between May 3 and July 12, 2026. The main tournament will feature 18 wrestlers divided into three blocks, where a wrestler earns three points for a win and, in the case of a draw, two points if the wrestler has a notably shorter career and one point for more seasoned veterans. Additionally, a "Young Block" for rookies will be held under the same rules, as well as an "Elizabeth Block," where the winner would earn an opportunity at the World Woman Pro-Wrestling Diana Queen Elizabeth Championship.

=== Blocks ===
Current standings
Namijo Swell Block		Namijo Breaker Block		Namijo Surge Block		Young Block (Note: The winner of the Young Block did not advance further in the competition)		Elizabeth Block (Note: All the matches of the Elizabeth Block were contested under three-way rules, as the winner earned an opportunity at the World Woman Pro-Wrestling Diana Queen Elizabeth Championship. The point system awarded only three points for a victory. The winner of the block did not advance further in the competition.)	
Itsuki Aoki	13	Mirai	10	Yuuri	11	Miku Kanae	15	Miyako Matsumoto	6
Kakeru Sekiguchi	9	Kohaku	10	Honoka	11	Miria Koga	15	Yumi Ohka	6
Maika Ozaki	8	Haruka Umesaki	9	Rian	7	Anna	12	Kaori Yoneyama	6
Saki	7	Rina Amikura	9	Arisa Shinose	6	Saito	9	Cherry	6
Kaho Kobayashi	5	Momoka Hanazono	4	Zones	6	Konomi Hori	3	Mochi Natsumi	6
Sumire Natsu	3	Yuko Sakurai	2	Saran	4	Shiono	0		

Namijo Swell Block	Aoki	Kobayashi	Sekiguchi	Ozaki	Natsu	Saki
Aoki	—N/a	Draw (10:00)	Draw (10:00)	Aoki (8:51)	Aoki (8:17)	Aoki (9:09)
Kobayashi	Draw (10:00)	—N/a	Draw (10:00)	Ozaki (7:09)	Kobayashi (6:37)	Saki (9:51)
Sekiguchi	Draw (10:00)	Draw (10:00)	—N/a	Sekiguchi (8:15)	Natsu (1:11)	Sekiguchi (7:32)
Ozaki	Aoki (8:51)	Ozaki (7:09)	Sekiguchi (8:15)	—N/a	Ozaki (8:37)	Draw (10:00)
Natsu	Aoki (8:17)	Kobayashi (6:37)	Natsu (1:11)	Ozaki (8:37)	—N/a	Saki (9:57)
Saki	Aoki (9:09)	Saki (9:51)	Sekiguchi (7:32)	Draw (10:00)	Saki (9:57)	—N/a
Namijo Breaker Block	Umesaki	Kohaku	Mirai	Hanazono	Amikura	Sakurai
Umesaki	—N/a	Draw (10:00)	Draw (10:00)	Hanazono (7:33)	Umesaki (6:52)	Umesaki (6:42)
Kohaku	Draw (10:00)	—N/a	Kohaku (8:45)	Kohaku (8:57)	Amikura (8:46)	Kohaku (9:29)
Mirai	Draw (10:00)	Kohaku (8:45)	—N/a	Mirai (8:23)	Mirai (9:07)	Draw (10:00)
Hanazono	Hanazono (7:33)	Kohaku (8:57)	Mirai (8:23)	—N/a	Amikura (6:46)	Draw (10:00)
Amikura	Umesaki (6:52)	Amikura (8:46)	Mirai (9:07)	Amikura (6:46)	—N/a	Amikura (8:17)
Sakurai	Umesaki (6:42)	Kohaku (9:29)	Draw (10:00)	Draw (10:00)	Amikura (8:17)	—N/a
Namijo Surge Block	Shinose	Honoka	Rian	Saran	Yuuri	Zones
Shinose	—N/a	Shinose (8:25)	Rian (8:11)	Shinose (9:26)	Yuuri (8:52)	Zones (8:32)
Honoka	Shinose (8:25)	—N/a	Honoka (9:13)	Honoka (9:56)	Draw (10:00)	Honoka (8:23)
Rian	Rian (8:11)	Honoka (9:13)	—N/a	Draw (10:00)	Yuuri (9:51)	Draw (10:00)
Saran	Shinose (9:26)	Honoka (9:56)	Draw (10:00)	—N/a	Yuuri (9:57)	Saran (9:58)
Yuuri	Yuuri (8:52)	Draw (10:00)	Yuuri (9:51)	Yuuri (9:57)	—N/a	Draw (10:00)
Zones	Zones (8:32)	Honoka (8:23)	Draw (10:00)	Saran (9:58)	Draw (10:00)	—N/a

Decision matches (July 2)
No.	Results	Stipulations	Times
1	Yuuri defeated Honoka by pinfall	Singles match, Namijo Surge Block First-Place Decision match	11:39
2	Mirai defeated Kohaku by pinfall	Singles match, Namijo Breaker Block First-Place Decision match	10:06

=== Winner tournament ===
First round (July 3)
Itsuki Aoki	Pin
Rina Amikura	11:25
Honoka	Pin
Kohaku	11:06
Kakeru Sekiguchi	9:14
Haruka Umesaki	Pin
Yuuri	12:23
Mirai	Pin

Semifinals (July 12)
Itsuki Aoki	7:35
Honoka	Pin
Haruka Umesaki	Pin
Mirai	10:01

Finals (July 12)
Honoka	12:52
Haruka Umesaki	Pin

=== Other tournaments ===
Young Block	Anna	Hori	Kanae	Koga	Saito	Shiono
Anna	—N/a	Anna (3:03)	Kanae (7:25)	Koga (7:17)	Anna (5:34)	Anna (Forfeit)
Hori	Anna (3:03)	—N/a	Kanae (7:02)	Koga (7:28)	Saito (5:02)	Hori (Forfeit)
Kanae	Kanae (7:25)	Kanae (7:02)	—N/a	DCO (7:55)	Kanae (6:18)	Kanae (Forfeit)
Koga	Koga (7:17)	Koga (7:28)	DCO (7:55)	—N/a	Koga (5:32)	Koga (3:51)
Saito	Anna (5:34)	Saito (5:02)	Kanae (6:18)	Koga (5:32)	—N/a	Saito (Forfeit)
Shiono	Anna (Forfeit)	Hori (Forfeit)	Kanae (Forfeit)	Koga (3:51)	Saito (Forfeit)	—N/a

Championship tiebreaker (July 3)
Miria Koga	Pin
Miku Kanae	11:19

Elizabeth Block
No.	Results	Stipulations	Times
1	Miyako Matsumoto defeated Kaori Yoneyama and Yumi Ohka by pinfall	Three-way match, Elizabeth Block match Night 1 (May 3)	11:17
2	Miyako Matsumoto defeated Yumi Ohka and Mochi Natsume by pinfall	Three-way match, Elizabeth Block match Night 2 (May 4)	12:39
3	Cherry defeated Miyako Matsumoto and Yumi Ohka by pinfall	Three-way match, Elizabeth Block match Night 4 (May 10)	11:59
4	Yumi Ohka defeated Cherry and Kaori Yoneyama by pinfall	Three-way match, Elizabeth Block match Night 5 (May 19)	9:36
5	Kaori Yoneyama defeated Yumi Ohka and Mochi Natsumi by pinfall	Three-way match, Elizabeth Block match Night 6 (May 24)	9:22
6	Cherry defeated Kaori Yoneyama and Miyako Matsumoto by pinfall	Three-way match, Elizabeth Block match Night 7 (June 1)	5:45
7	Mochi Natsumi defeated Cherry and Miyako Matsumoto by pinfall	Three-way match, Elizabeth Block match Night 9 (June 10)	8:31
8	Yumi Ohka defeated Cherry and Mochi Natsumi by pinfall	Three-way match, Elizabeth Block match Night 12 (June 28)	11:17
9	Kaori Yoneyama defeated Cherry and Mochi Natsumi by pinfall	Three-way match, Elizabeth Block match Night 13 (July 1)	6:55
10	Mochi Natsumi defeated Kaori Yoneyama and Miyako Matsumoto by pinfall	Three-way match, Elizabeth Block match Night 14 (July 2)	3:58
11	Kaori Yoneyama, Miyako Matsumoto, and Yumi Ohka defeated Cherry and Mochi Natsumi	Five-way elimination match, Elizabeth Block decision match Night 15 (July 3)	12:23
12	Yumi Ohka defeated Kaori Yoneyama and Miyako Matsumoto by pinfall	Three-way match, Elizabeth Block final Night 16 (July 12)	7:47

== Catch the Wave Awards ==
Since 2011, in addition of winning the tournament, the participants receives awards in different categories based on their performance during the tournament.

=== Best Bout Award (ベストバウト賞, Besutobauto-shō) ===
Year	Date	Match	Location
2011	May 29	Ayumi Kurihara vs. Yumi Ohka	Tokyo, Japan
2012	June 24	Ayumi Kurihara vs. Syuri	Osaka, Japan
2013	May 26	Ayako Hamada vs. Ryo Mizunami	Osaka, Japan
2014	May 13	Kyoko Kimura vs. Sakura Hirota	Tokyo, Japan
2015	June 10	Ryo Mizunami vs. Yumi Ohka	Tokyo, Japan
2016	May 3	Mika Iida vs. Tsukushi	Tokyo, Japan
2017	May 23	Hiroe Nagahama vs. Misaki Ohata	Saitama, Japan
2018	March 23	Hikaru Shida vs. Misaki Ohata	Tokyo, Japan
2019	July 1	Himeka Arita vs. Nagisa Nozaki	Tokyo, Japan
2021	June 8	Tomoko Watanabe vs. Yako	Saitama, Japan
2022	May 29	Hanako Nakamori vs. Hikari Shimizu	Kawasaki, Kanagawa, Japan
2023	June 1	Ayame Sasamura vs. Itsuki Aoki	Tokyo, Japan
2023	May 5	Itsuki Aoki vs. Kakeru Sekiguchi	Tokyo, Japan
2025	May 14	Mio Shirai vs. Risa Sera	Tokyo, Japan
2025	July 5	Haruka Umesaki vs. Kaho Kobayashi	Kawasaki, Kanagawa, Japan

=== Best Performance Award (ベストパフォーマンス賞, Besutopafōmansu-shō) ===
Year	Wrestler(s)
2012	Hamuko Hoshi
2013	Shuu Shibutani
2014	Tsukasa Fujimoto
2015	Wonderful World Fairy Family (Ayako Hamada, Chikayo Nagashima, Fairy Nihonbashi, Tsukasa Fujimoto (2), Yuu Yamagata and Yumi Ohka)
2016	Atsushi Ishiguro and Mayumi Ozaki
2018	Sakura Hirota and Yuki Miyazaki
2022	Haruka Umesaki
2023	Risa Sera
2024	Kohaku and Shin Sakura Hirota vs. Honoka and Yuki Miyazaki; June 16

=== Fighting Spirit Award (敢闘賞, Kantō-shō) ===
Year	Wrestler
2011	Mika Iida
2012	Hamuko Hoshi
2013	Kagetsu
2014	Sakura Hirota
2015	Ryo Mizunami
2016	Rabbit Miu
2017	Rin Kadokura
2018	Miyuki Takase
2019	Hamuko Hoshi, Haruka Umesaki and Maria
2021	Mio Momono
2022	Itsuki Aoki
2023	Yuko Sakurai
2024	Momoka Hanazono
2025	Mio Shirai

=== Outstanding Performance Award (殊勲賞, Shukunshō) ===
Year	Wrestler
2011	Mio Shirai
2012	Sawako Shimono
2013	Mio Shirai (2)
2014	Mika Iida
2015	Mika Iida
2016	Hiroe Nagahama
2017	Hiroe Nagahama
2018	Hiroe Nagahama
2019	Yuu
2021	Mio Momono
2022	Haruka Umesaki
2023	Itsuki Aoki
2024	Ranna Yagami
2025	Mizuki Kato

=== Special Award (特別賞, Tokubetsu-shō) ===
Year	Wrestler
2018	Misaki Ohata
2019	Hikaru Shida
2025	Cherry
2025	Risa Sera
2025	Sumire Natsu

=== Technique Award (技能賞, Ginō-shō) ===
Year	Wrestler
2011	Tomoka Nakagawa
2012	Tsukasa Fujimoto
2013	Yuu Yamagata
2014	Sakura Hirota
2015	Mika Iida
2016	Mika Iida
2017	Mochi Miyagi
2018	Asuka
2019	Yuki Miyazaki
2021	Hibiscus Mii
2022	Kaori Yoneyama
2023	Yuki Miyazaki
2024	Kakeru Sekiguchi
2025	Hazuki

== See also ==
- Dual Shock Wave
- Pro Wrestling Wave
- 5Star Grand Prix Tournament
