= Hiroe Nagahama =

Japanese professional wrestler

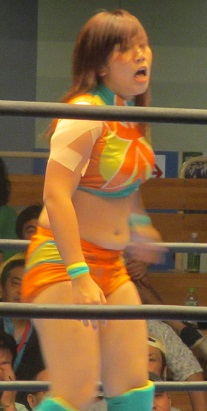

Personal information
- Born: November 4, 1995 (age 30) Niigata, Japan

Professional wrestling career
- Ring name(s): Hiroe Nagahama; HIRO'e
- Billed height: 157 cm (5 ft 2 in)
- Billed weight: 60 kg (132 lb)
- Trained by: Ayako Hamada; Yumi Ohka
- Debut: 2014
- Retired: 2020

Hiroe Nagahama (長浜浩江, Nagahama Hiroe) is a Japanese retired professional wrestler best known for her tenures with Pro Wrestling Wave and Ice Ribbon.

== Professional wrestling career ==
=== Independent circuit (2014–2020) ===
During her career, Nagahama often made freelance work by competing in various promotions from the Japanese independent scene. At Oz Academy Saturday Night Fever on March 17, 2018, she teamed up with Mika Iida and Misaki Ohata in a losing effort against Aoi Kizuki, Sakura Hirota and Tsubasa Kuragaki as a result of a six-woman tag team match. On the third night of the Wrestle-1 Tour 2018 Cherry Blossom from April 18, she teamed up with Asuka to defeat Hana Kimura and Natsumi Maki. At Seadlinnng Yokohama Flash! 2019 on February 9, she teamed up with Mima Shimoda in a losing effort against Arisa Nakajima and Ayame Sasamura. Due to one of Pro Wrestling Wave's business partnerships, Nagahama competed at a house show promoted by Marvelous That's Women Pro Wrestling on February 24, 2020, where she teamed up with Nagisa Nozaki, Sakura Hirota, Yuki Miyazaki and Yumi Ohka as "Team Wave" and went into a time-limit draw against Tem Marvelous (Hibiki, Kaoru, Mikoto Shindo, Takumi Iroha and Tomoko Watanabe).

=== Ice Ribbon (2014–2020) ===
Due to Pro Wrestling Wave and Ice Ribbon holding business partnerships, Nagahama competed many times in the latter promotion's events. She made her first appearance at New Ice Ribbon #603 on November 8, 2014, where she fell short to Maki Narumiya in singles competition. At RibbonMania 2019 on December 31, she competed in Tequila Saya's retirement match, a gauntlet match in which the latter put herself against 44 opponents. Some of the most notable were Nagahama herself alongside Miku Aono, Banny Oikawa, Rina Shingaki, Ken Ohka, Manami Toyota, Risa Sera, Hiragi Kurumi, Syuri, Tae Honma, and many others. She took part into the 2nd Kizuna Tournament of August 29, 2020, event in which she teamed up with Tsukasa Fujimoto and defeated Rina Yamashita and Satsuki Totoro in the first rounds but fell short to Maya Yukihi and Suzu Suzuki in the semifinals.

=== Pro Wrestling Wave (2014–2020) ===
Nagahama is probably best known for her time in Pro Wrestling Wave. She made her professional wrestling debut at WAVE Virgin Code on October 29, 2014, where she fell short to Mio Shirai in singles competition. The only championship she has held in the promotion was the Wave Tag Team Championship which she succeeded in winning at Pro Wrestling Wave's 10th Anniversary event from August 12, 2017, where she teamed up with her "Big Rice Field" tag team partner Kaho Kobayashi to defeat Gokigen BBA (Cherry and Kaori Yoneyama) for the titles.

Iida competed in various of the promotion's signature events such as the Catch the Wave, in which she made her first appearance at the 2015 edition of the tournament in which she competed in the "Young Block Oh! Oh!" division, falling short to Maya Yukihi in the first rounds. One year later she appeared for the first time in the big tournament, placing herself in the "Italian Red" block in which she scored a total of three points after going against Sareee, Yumi Ohka and Mayumi Ozaki. She also competed in the Young Block Oh! Oh!, topping the first block with a total of six points after outmatching Akane Fujita, Sumire Natsu and Mari An, but eventually falling short to Yuka in the finals. At the 2017 edition, she placed herself in the A block where she scored a total of seven points after competing against Misaki Ohata, Rina Yamashita and Moeka Haruhi. At the 2018 edition she fought in the "Violence" block where she scored a total of five points after going against Ayako Hamada, Arisa Nakajima, Misaki Ohata, Mio Momono and Hikaru Shida. At the 2019 edition she competed under the shortened name of Hiro'e in the Young block which she topped with a total of six points after outmatching Haruka Umesaki, Ibuki Hoshi and Maria.

As for the Dual Shock Wave, Nagahama made her first appearance at the 2016 edition of the tournament where she teamed up with Moeka Haruhi as "Happy!" and fell short to Chihiro Hashimoto and Ryo Mizunami in the first rounds. At the 2017 edition, Nagahama teamed up with Kaho Kobayashi as "Big Rice Field" and fell short to New-Tra (Rin Kadokura and Takumi Iroha) in the first rounds.

Nagahama announced her retirement from in-ring competition in December 2019 due to health issues. She wrestled her last match at an event promoted specially for her farewell, the WAVE HIRO'e Retirement Last Longbeach on September 18, 2020, where she teamed up with Nagisa Nozaki to defeat Kaori Yoneyama and Miyuki Takase.

== Championships and accomplishments ==
- Pro Wrestling Wave
  - Wave Tag Team Championship (1 time) – with Kaho Kobayashi
  - Catch the Wave (Young Block 2019)
  - Catch the Wave Award (4 times)
    - Best Bout Award (2017) vs. Misaki Ohata on May 23
    - Outstanding Performance Award (2016, 2017, 2018)
