= Wave Single Championship =

Professional wrestling women's championship

- Official design of the championship (2012–present)

Details
- Promotion: Pro Wrestling Wave
- Date established: December 5, 2012
- Current champion: Haruka Umesaki
- Date won: August 15, 2026
Statistics
- First champion: Yumi Ohka
- Most reigns: Misaki Ohata (3 reigns)
- Longest reign: Yumi Ohka (1st reign, 525 days)
- Shortest reign: Misaki Ohata (3rd reign, <1 day)
- Oldest champion: Yuki Miyazaki (44 years, 325 days)
- Youngest champion: Asuka (19 years, 296 days)
- Heaviest champion: Ryo Mizunami (80 kg (180 lb))
- Lightest champion: Misaki Ohata (54 kg (119 lb))

The Wave Single Championship (WAVE認定シングル王座, Wēbu-nintei Shinguru Ōza) is a women's professional wrestling championship owned by the Pro Wrestling Wave promotion. The title is nicknamed and more commonly referred to as the Regina di Wave Championship (Regina di WAVE王座, Rejīna di Wēbu Ōza; Italian for "Queen of Wave"). The championship, which is situated at the top of Pro Wrestling Wave's championship hierarchy, was first announced on December 5, 2012. The inaugural champion was crowned on March 17, 2013, when Yumi Ohka defeated Kana in the finals of a five-woman tournament.

There have been a total of 25 reigns shared between 17 different wrestlers. Haruka Umesaki is the current champion in her first reign.

== History ==
On December 5, 2012, Pro Wrestling Wave's founder and booker Gami announced the creation of the Wave Single Championship. Prior to the announcement, Wave, which was founded in August 2007, had no singles championships; instead the annual Catch the Wave tournament served as the promotion's top singles achievement.

=== Regina di Wave tournament ===
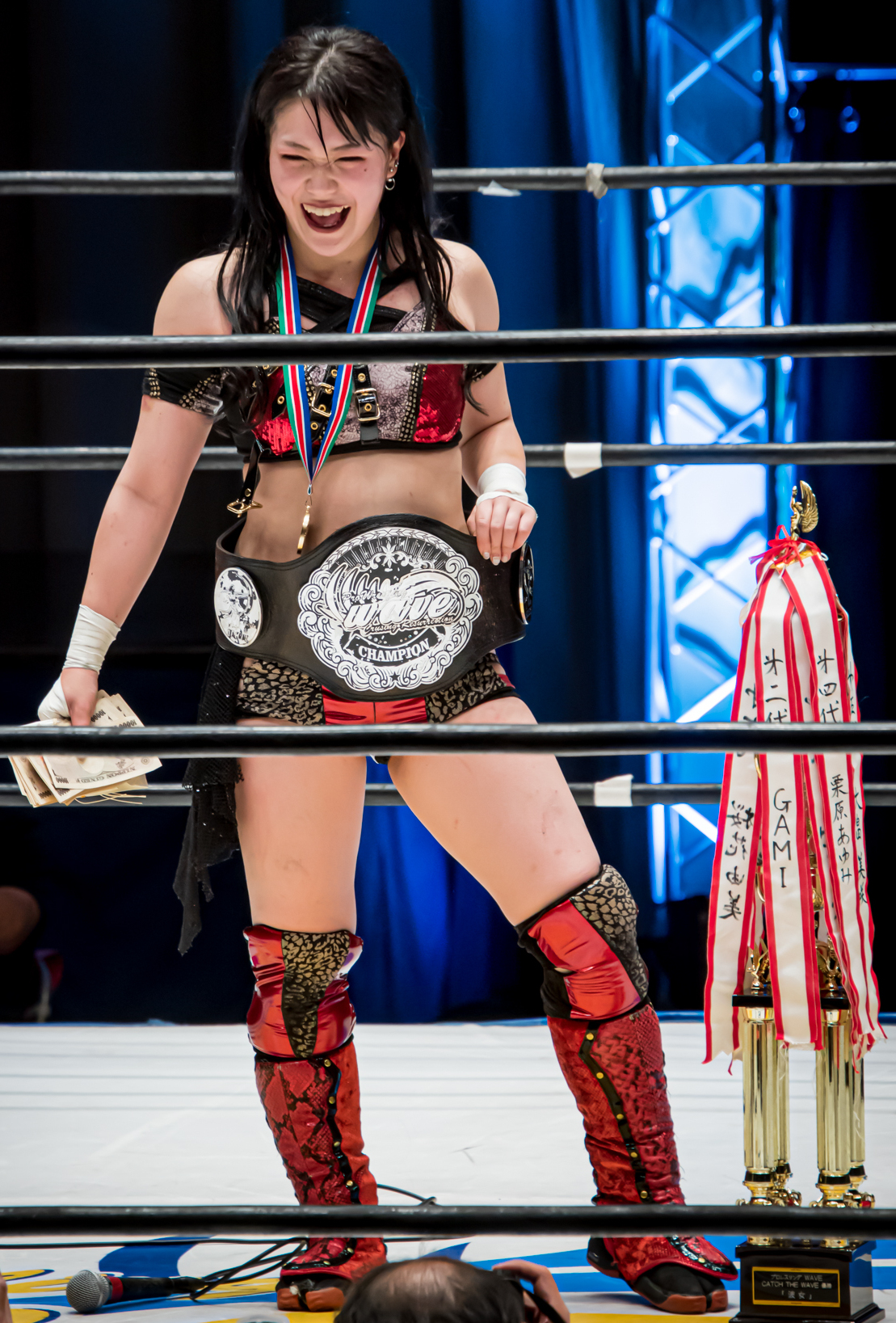
Suzu Suzuki with the title in July 2022.

Gami then announced that the inaugural champion would be determined in a four-woman single-elimination "Regina di Wave" tournament, which would include three former winners of Catch the Wave; Ayumi Kurihara (winner of the 2012 tournament), Kana (2011) and Yumi Ohka (2009), and the winner of a one-night Zan-1 tournament, a three-round tournament, which included a battle royal, a rock-paper-scissors round and a fan vote. Gami herself was also a former Catch the Wave winner from 2010, but decided not to put herself in the title tournament. On December 16, Misaki Ohata won the Zan-1 tournament to earn the fourth and final spot in the title tournament. On January 23, 2013, a random draw decided that in the first round of the tournament on February 17, Ayumi Kurihara would face Kana, while Misaki Ohata would face Yumi Ohka. The finals of the tournament were set to take place on March 17. On February 16, Wave announced that Kurihara had suffered a nasal and orbital floor fracture and would be forced to pull out of the tournament. She would be replaced by Mio Shirai, who had finished second in the Zan-1 tournament. In the following day's semifinal matches, Kana defeated Shirai, while Ohka defeated Ohata. However, it was announced that if Kurihara was able to return to the ring by March 17, she would get to wrestle Kana for a spot in the finals. On March 7, Kurihara announced that she was going to make her return for the match against Kana. In order to prevent Ohka from having the advantage of having to wrestle only one match on March 17, she was put in a non-tournament match against Gami. On March 17, Kana defeated Kurihara to hold on to her spot in the finals of the tournament. Later that same day, Ohka defeated Kana in the finals to win the tournament and become the inaugural Wave Single Champion.

Semifinal (February 17, 2013)
Kana	Sub
Mio Shirai	11:26

Semifinals (February 17, 2013; March 17, 2013)
Yumi Ohka	Pin
Misaki Ohata	20:17
Ayumi Kurihara	Sub
Kana	14:16

Finals (March 17, 2013)
Yumi Ohka	Pin
Kana	15:04

== Reigns ==
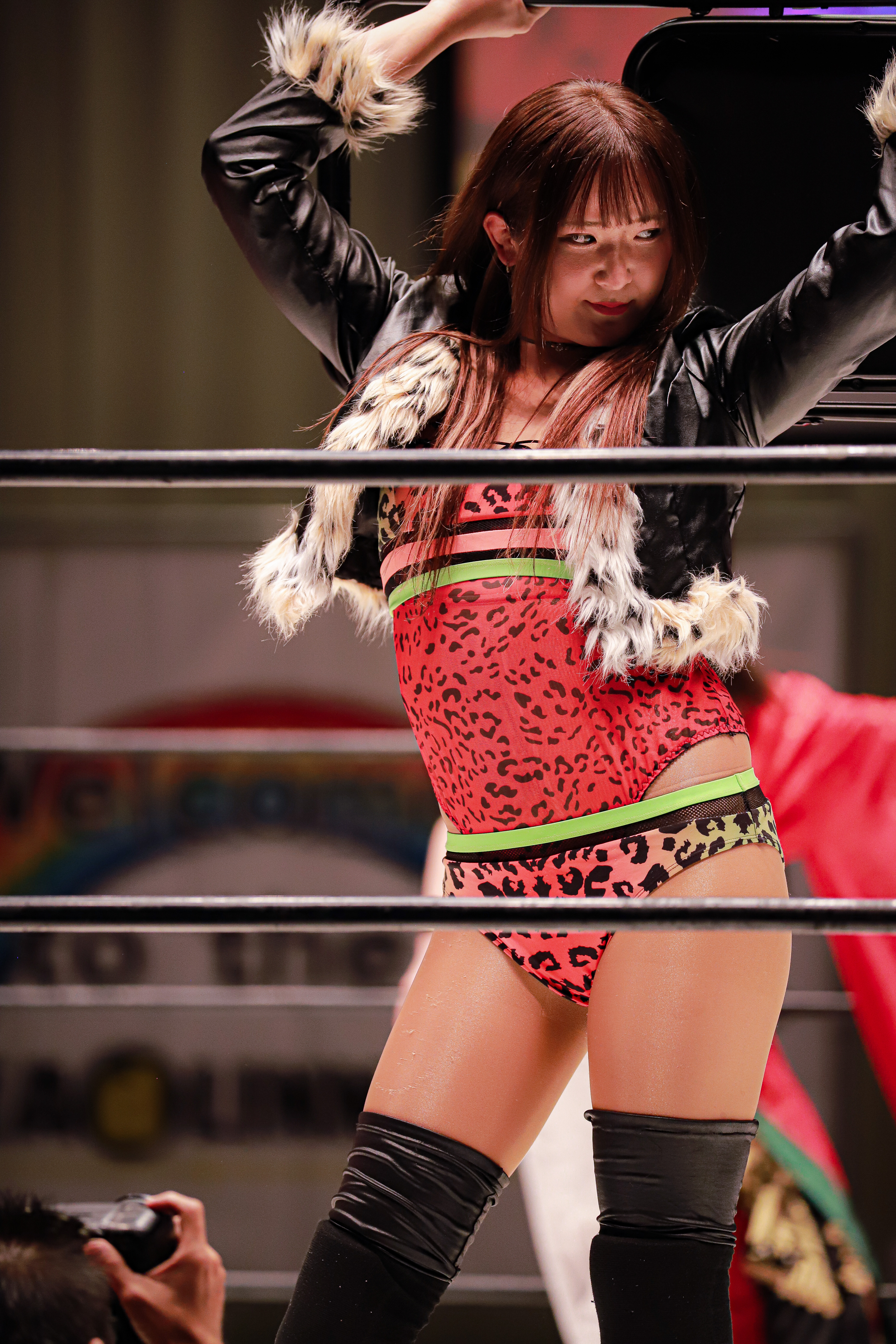
Two-time champion Veny

As of November 7, 2026, there have been 25 reigns between 17 champions and two vacancies. Yumi Ohka was the inaugural. Ohaka's first reign was also the longest at 525 days, while Misaki Ohata's third reign aws the shortest, which lasted less than a day. Ohata also has the most reigns at three. Yuu Yamagata is the oldest champion at 39 years old, while Asuka is the youngest at 19 years old.

Haruka Umesaki is the current champion at her first reign. She defeated Itsuki Aoki on August 15, 2026 at WAVE Yumi Ohka 25th Anniversary in Tokyo, Japan.

Key
No.	Overall reign number
Reign	Reign number for the specific champion
Days	Number of days held
Defenses	Number of successful defenses
<1	Reign lasted less than a day
+	Current reign is changing daily

No.	Champion	Championship change			Reign statistics			Notes	Ref.
No.	Champion	Date	Event	Location	Reign	Days	Defenses	Notes	Ref.
1	Yumi Ohka	March 17, 2013	Sunday Wave Vol. 14	Tokyo, Japan	1	525	7	Ohka defeated Kana in the finals of a five-woman tournament to become the inaugural champion.	
2	Hikaru Shida	August 24, 2014	Happy Anniversary Wave: Seven	Tokyo, Japan	1	171	4		
3	Ayako Hamada	February 11, 2015	Second Virgin	Tokyo, Japan	1	319	4		
4	Yuu Yamagata	December 27, 2015	Thanksgiving Wave	Tokyo, Japan	1	368	4		
5	Ryo Mizunami	December 29, 2016	Thanksgiving Wave 16	Tokyo, Japan	1	185	4		
6	Rina Yamashita	July 2, 2017	Be Exciting!	Tokyo, Japan	1	99	2		
7	Misaki Ohata	October 9, 2017	Saint October	Tokyo, Japan	1	81	5		
8	Yumi Ohka	December 29, 2017	Thanksgiving WAVE '17	Tokyo, Japan	2	22	2		
9	Misaki Ohata	January 20, 2018	Saturday Night Fever January	Tokyo, Japan	2	159	2		
10	Takumi Iroha	June 28, 2018	Weekday Wave Vol. 116: Height Max!	Tokyo, Japan	1	52	0		
11	Asuka	August 19, 2018	Anivarsario WAVE 2018	Tokyo, Japan	1	118	2		
12	Ryo Mizunami	December 15, 2018	Dai Shiwazu Nishi 18 Vol. 2	Tokyo, Japan	2	14	0		
13	Misaki Ohata	December 29, 2018	Phase 1 Final: Kick Out – Misaki Ohata Retirement – Beautifully Bloom	Tokyo, Japan	3	<1	0		
—	Vacated	December 29, 2018	Phase 1 Final: Kick Out – Misaki Ohata Retirement – Beautifully Bloom	Tokyo, Japan	—	—	—	The championship was vacated due to Ohata retiring from professional wrestling.	
14	Takumi Iroha	July 15, 2019	Catch The Wave 2019 Final	Tokyo, Japan	2	167	5	Iroha defeated Nagisa Nozaki and Ryo Mizunami in the finals of Catch the WAVE tournament to win the vacant championship.	
15	Nagisa Nozaki	December 29, 2019	Thanksgiving Wave	Tokyo, Japan	1	364	5		
16	Sakura Hirota	December 27, 2020	Thanksgiving Wave: Byebye 2020	Tokyo, Japan	1	238	3		
17	Nagisa Nozaki	August 22, 2021	Summer Wars 14th Summer	Tokyo, Japan	2	329	4		
—	Vacated	July 17, 2022	Catch The Wave 2022 Final	Tokyo, Japan	—	—	—	Nozaki vacated the title due to suffering a legitimate injury.	
18	Suzu Suzuki	July 17, 2022	Catch the Wave 2022 Final	Tokyo, Japan	1	28	0	Suzuki was initially scheduled to face Nagisa Nozaki for the championship in the 2022 Catch the Wave Tournament finals, but due to the latter relinquishing the title after suffering a legitimate injury, Suzuki faced Miyuki Takase whom she defeated to win the vacant title and subsequently the tournament finals.	
19	Hikaru Shida	August 14, 2022	Wave 15th Anniversary ~ Carnival Wave	Tokyo, Japan	2	413	5		
20	Veny	October 1, 2023	WAVE PHASE2 Reboot 4th ~ NAMI 1	Tokyo, Japan	2	84	0	Veny was previously known as Asuka.	
21	Yuki Miyazaki	December 24, 2023	WAVE Carnival Wave ~ Christmas Deluxe	Kawasaki, Japan	1	316	6		
22	Saya Kamitani	November 4, 2024	WAVE 2024 Prime WAVE	Tokyo, Japan	1	279	4		
23	Kohaku	August 10, 2025	WAVE 18th Anniversary ~ Carnival WAVE	Tokyo, Japan	1	84	2		
24	Itsuki Aoki	November 2, 2025	WAVE Prime Wave 2025	Tokyo, Japan	1	286	2		
25	Haruka Umesaki	August 15, 2026	WAVE Yumi Ohka 25th Anniversary	Tokyo, Japan	1	84+	1		

== Combined reigns ==
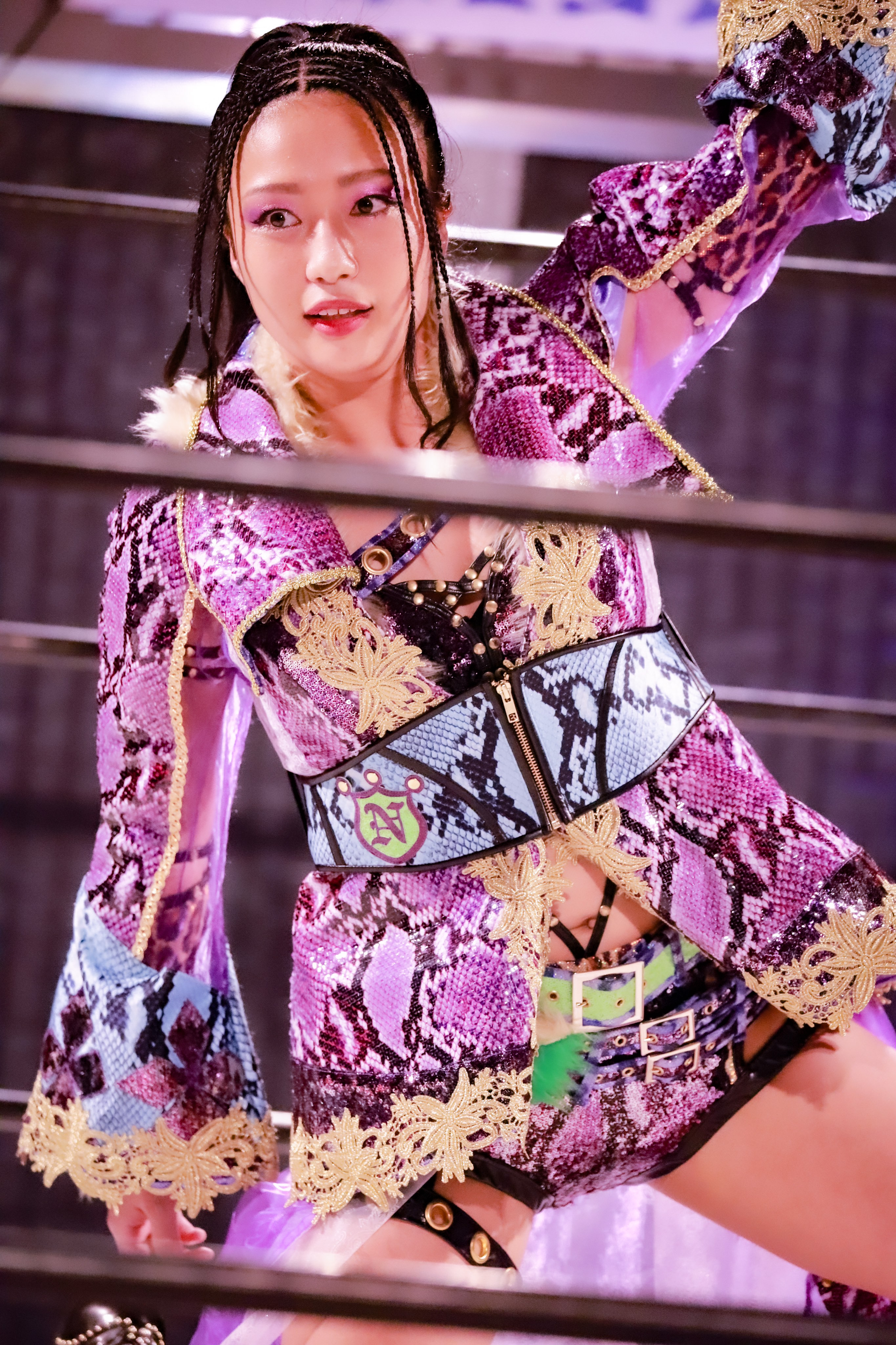
Record tying two-time and longest combined reigning champion, Nagisa Nozaki

As of November 7, 2026

†	Indicates the current champions

Rank	Wrestler	No. of reigns	Combined defenses	Combined days
1	Nagisa Nozaki	2	9	693
2	Hikaru Shida	2	9	584
3	Yumi Ohka	2	8	547
4	Yuu Yamagata	1	4	368
5	Ayako Hamada	1	4	319
6	Yuki Miyazaki	1	6	316
7	Itsuki Aoki	1	2	286
8	Saya Kamitani	1	4	279
9	Misaki Ohata	3	7	240
10	Sakura Hirota	1	3	238
11	Takumi Iroha	2	5	219
12	Asuka/Veny	2	2	202
13	Ryo Mizunami	2	4	199
14	Rina Yamashita	1	2	99
15	Haruka Umesaki †	1	1	84+
16	Kohaku	1	2	84
17	Suzu Suzuki	1	0	28
