= Asami Kawasaki =

Japanese professional wrestler and actress

Asami Kawasaki (川崎亜沙美, Kawasaki Asami; born 18 October 1984 in Kishiwada, Osaka) is a Japanese professional wrestler and actress. She debuted as a pro wrestler in 2003 while also attending an acting school run by Yoshimoto Kōgyō. Wrestling for a time for JDStar, she retired from the ring in 2006, but returned again in 2009. She currently wrestles freelance. In 2012, she was cast as the second daughter of the heroine in the popular Asadora Carnation on NHK. The character is based on the fashion designer Junko Koshino.
