= Debbie Keitel =

Irish professional wrestler (born 1989)

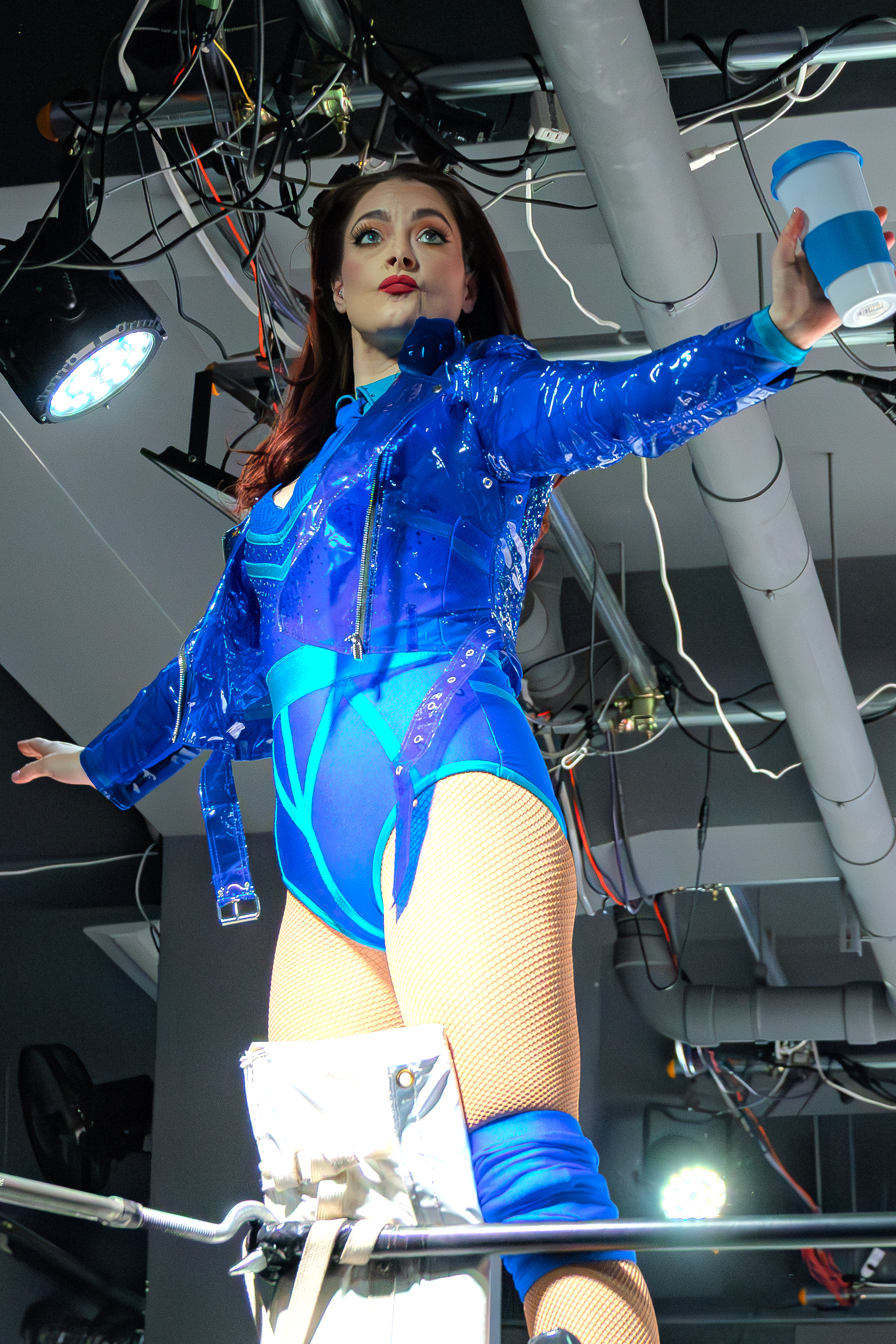
- Keitel in March 2025

Personal information
- Born: 31 March 1989 (age 37) Galway, Ireland

Professional wrestling career
- Ring name: Debbie Keitel
- Billed height: 157 cm (5 ft 2 in)
- Billed weight: 55 kg (121 lb)
- Trained by: Fight Factory Pro Wrestling (Phil Boyd)
- Debut: 2017

Kaydell Joyce better known by her ring name Debbie Keitel is an Irish professional wrestler currently working as a freelancer. She is best known for her tenures with various promotions from the European independent circuit such as Pro-Wrestling: EVE, Revolution Pro Wrestling (RevPro) and from the Japanese scene such as World Woman Pro-Wrestling Diana.

== Professional wrestling career ==
Joyce made her professional wrestling debut at Uprising 2: Hit Hard Or Die Trying, an event promoted by Uprising Wrestling on May 7, 2017, where she defeated local talent in singles competition. Joyce is known for her tenures with various promotions from the British independent scene such as Fight Factory Pro Wrestling (FFPW), Insane Championship Wrestling (ICW), Over The Top Wrestling (OTT) and many others.

=== European independent circuit (2017–present) ===
Joyce competed at NXT UK #62 episode from September 18, 2019, where she fell short to Rhea Ripley in singles competition.

Joyce competed in several of Progress Wrestling's Chapter series of events. She made her first appearance at Chapter 164: For The Love Of Progress 2 on March 1, 2024, where she unsuccessfully challenged Rhio for the Progress World Women's Championship. At Chapter 170: Wrestling Never Sleeps on August 26, 2024, where she teamed up with Lena Kross and Nina Samuels in a losing effort against Kanji and The Experience (LA Taylor and Skye Smitson).

At RevPro 12th Anniversary Show on August 24, 2024, Joyce teamed up with Nightshade, Rhio, Kanji and Gisele Shaw in a losing effort against The Cut Throat Collective (Alex Windsor, Lizzy Evo, Mercedez Blaze, Safire Reed and Nina Samuels) in ten-woman tag team competition. At RevPro Uprising 2021 on November 21, she unsuccessfully challenged Alex Windsor for the Undisputed British Women's Championship.

Joyce competed in the 2024 edition of Westside Xtreme Wrestling's wXw Femmes Fatales tournament in which she defeated Jane Nero, then fell short to Anita Vaughan in the finals.

==== Pro-Wrestling: EVE (2019–present) ====
Joyce is best known for her tenure with Pro-Wrestling: EVE. During her time in the promotion, she chased for various accomplishments. At EVE Wrestle Queendom 4 on August 27, 2021, she unsuccessfully competed in a six-way gauntlet match for the Pro-Wrestling: EVE International Championship in which reigning champion kasey retained over Joyce, Emersyn Jayne, Hyan, Maddison Miles and Nightshade. She also competed in a rumble match for the Pro-Wrestling: EVE Championship the same night, bout won by Jetta who dethroned previous champion Rhia O'Reilly.

She is a former two-time Pro-Wrestling: EVE Tag Team Championship, having won the titles for the first time alongside Valkyrie as "The Woke Queens" on October 12, 2019, at Check Yourself by defeating Laura Di Matteo and Mercedes Martinez in the tournament finals to win the vacant titles. Secondly, she won the titles alongside Anita Vaughan as "The Gals" at EVE 126: Beers, Brawls & Burlesque on September 6, 2024, by defeating Operation SAS (Skye Smitson and Nightshade).

=== Japanese independent circuit (2025–present) ===
==== World Woman Pro-Wrestling Diana (2025–present) ====
Joyce made her debut in the Japanese independent scene in World Woman Pro-Wrestling Diana, at a house show promoted on January 26, 2025, where she teamed up with Dash Chisako in a losing effort against Ayako Sato and Himiko. At a house show from July 27, 2025, she teamed up with Sato as "Caffeine Crush" and defeated Nijumaru (Nanami Hatano and Rina Amikura) to win the WWWD Tag Team Championship. At Diana 15th Anniversary NO. 1 on January 24, 2026, Joyce defeated Hatano to win the vacant WWWD World Championship.

Joyce began competing in World Wonder Ring Stardom's New Blood series of events in 2025, making her debut at Stardom New Blood 22 on June 4, 2025, where she defeated Akira Kurogane in singles competition. At Stardom New Blood 26 on October 30, 2025, she teamed up with Ram Kaicho and Azusa Inaba to defeat God's Eye (Tomoka Inaba, Ranna Yagami and Kiyoka Kotatsu).

== Championships and accomplishments ==
- Community Pro Wrestling
  - CPW Women's Championship (1 time)
- Fierce Females
  - Fierce Females Internet Championship (1 time)
- Flemish Wrestling Force
  - FWF Women's Championship (1 time)
- No Limit Wrestling
  - NLW Women's Championship (1 time)
- Over The Top Wrestling
  - OTT Women's Championship (1 time)
- Phoenix Wrestling
  - Phoenix Empress Championship (1 time)
- Pro-Wrestling: EVE
  - Pro-Wrestling: EVE Tag Team Championship (2 times) – with Valkyrie (1) and Anita Vaughan (1)
- Pro Wrestling Illustrated
  - Ranked No. 110 of the top 250 female singles wrestlers in the PWI Women's 250 in 2024
- Rebel County Wrestling
  - RCW Trios Championship (1 time) – with Gene Munny and J-Money
- World Woman Pro-Wrestling Diana
  - WWWD Tag Team Championship (1 time) – with Ayako Sato
  - WWWD World Championship (1 time)
