= Haruka Umesaki =

Japanese professional wrestler

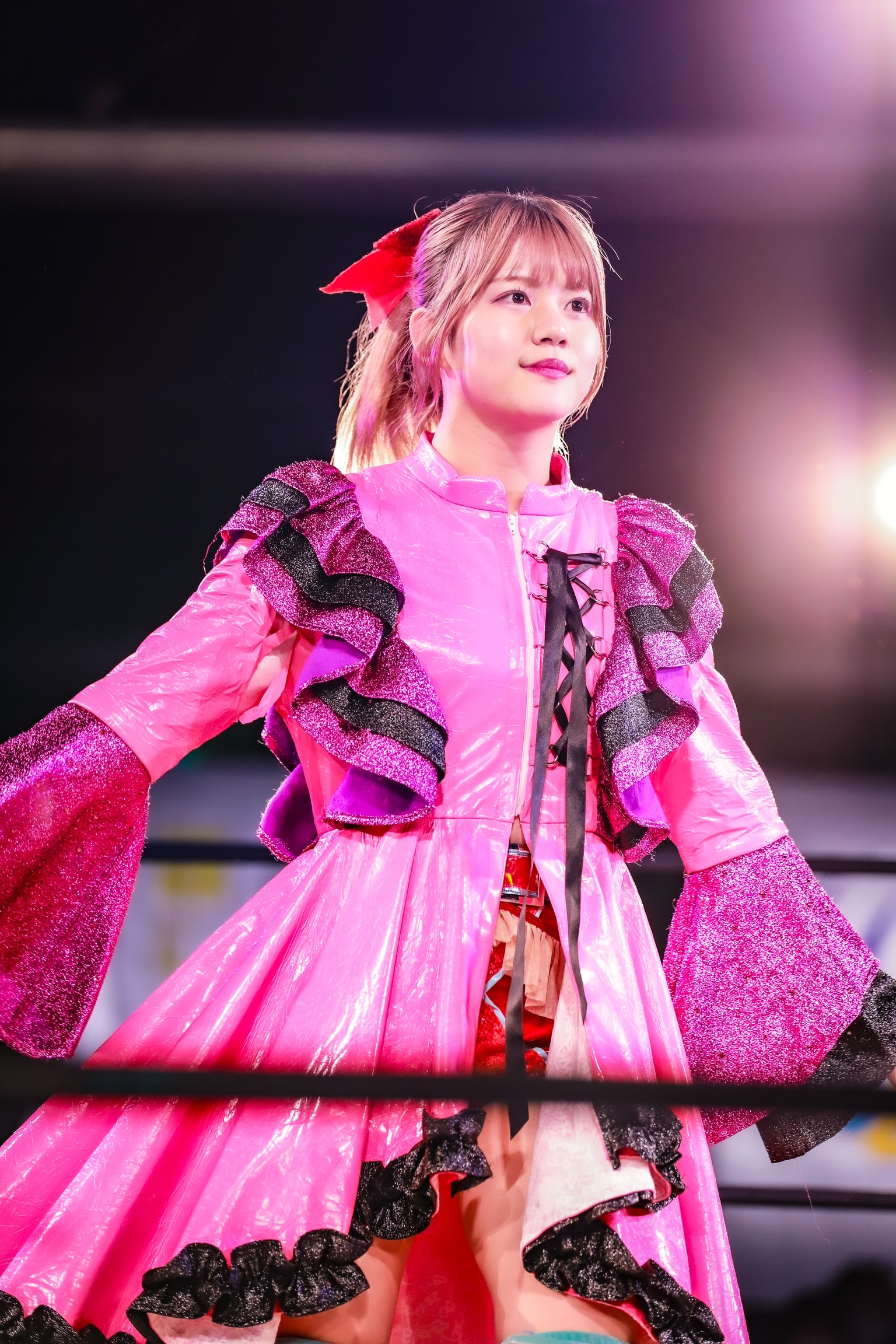
- Umesaki in April 2023

Personal information
- Born: February 7, 2001 (age 25) Ushiku, Ibaraki, Japan

Professional wrestling career
- Ring name(s): Karma; Haruka Umesaki
- Billed height: 157 cm (5 ft 2 in)
- Billed weight: 54 kg (119 lb)
- Trained by: Emi Sakura; Kaoru Ito; Sareee
- Debut: 2019

Haruka Umesaki (梅咲遥, Umesaki Haruka; born February 7, 2001) is a Japanese professional wrestler signed to World Woman Pro-Wrestling Diana, where she is the current WWWD World Champion in her third reign. She is also a four-time WWWD Tag Team Champion. She also appears in such promotions as Pro Wrestling Wave, Pure-J, YMZ and under the name Karma in World Wonder Ring Stardom.

== Professional wrestling career ==
=== World Women's Wrestling Diana (2019–present) ===
Umesaki debuted for World Woman Pro-Wrestling Diana in 2019. She is also known for competing in multiple promotions of the Japanese independent scene. At Seadlinnng Shin-Kiba 23rd Night on March 23, 2020, she picked up a victory over Honori Hana. At New Ice Ribbon #1078, an event produced by Ice Ribbon on October 31, 2020, Umesaki unsuccessfully faced Suzu Suzuki for the ICE Cross Infinity Championship. At a house show promoted by Pure-J on June 13, 2021, she unsuccessfully challenged Akari for the Princess of Pro Wrestling Championship. At Oz Academy Complete Control on February 13, 2022, Umesaki teamed up with Kakeru Sekiguchi to defeat Mei Suruga and Momoka Hanazono. On the fourth night of the Sendai Girls Acceleration, an event promoted by Sendai Girls' Pro Wrestling on February 27, 2022, Umesaki teamed up with Saori Anou in a losing effort against Manami and Ryo Mizunami as a result of a tag team match.

On April 29, 2023, Umesaki defeated Ayako Sato to win the WWWD World Championship. On August 15, Umesaki had her first successful title defense against Kakeru Sekiguchi.

=== Pro Wrestling Wave (2019–present) ===
Another promotion in which Umesaki activates in Pro Wrestling Wave. She is known for competing in the promotion's signature events such as Catch the Wave, making her first appearance at the 2019 edition, placing herself in the "Young Block" and scoring a total of two points after going against Hiro'e, Ibuki Hoshi and Maria. At the 2021 edition, she competed in the "Compliance Block" and scored a total of two points after going against Rin Kadokura, Yuki Miyazaki and Hibiscus Mii. Umesaki also competed in the Dual Shock Wave, at the 2020 edition where she teamed up with her "Luminous" tag team partner Miyuki Takase, falling short to Itsuki Aoki and Rin Kadokura, and Rina Shingaki and Ayame Sasamura in the first-rounds of the tournament.

=== Other Japanese promotions (2019–present) ===
Umesaki often competes in men's promotions as joshi talent. At 2AW Ayame Sasamura & Rina Shingaki Produce ~ Butterfly Dance, an event promoted by Active Advance Pro Wrestling on March 14, 2021, she fell short to Kakeru Sekiguchi. At ZERO1 Kumamoto Ekimae Pro-Wrestling 2021 Fuyu No Jin ~ Serious Pro-Wrestling In The Midst Of Infection Control, an event promoted by Pro Wrestling Zero1 on December 4, 2021, she teamed up with Rina Amikura in a losing effort against Hanako Nakamori and Takako Inoue.

=== World Wonder Ring Stardom (2022–present) ===
Umesaki competed in several of World Wonder Ring Stardom's major events. She made her first appearance at Stardom New Blood 1 on March 11, 2022, where she teamed up with Nanami in a losing effort against Oedo Tai's Starlight Kid and Ruaka. She competed in a Cinderella Rumble match on the second night of the Stardom World Climax 2022 from March 27, match won by Mei Suruga and also involving notable opponents such as Unagi Sayaka, Mina Shirakawa, Lady C, Saki Kashima and many others.

From 2023, Umesaki wrestled under a new ring name Karma (stylized in all caps). On March 25, 2023, at New Blood Premium, Karma alongside Starlight Kid, now known as Bloody Fate, defeated God's Eye (Mirai and Tomoka Inaba) in the finals of an eight-team tournament to become the inaugural New Blood Tag Team Champions. At New Blood 11 on September 29, Bloody Fate lost the New Blood Tag Team Championship to wing★gori.

== Championships and accomplishments ==
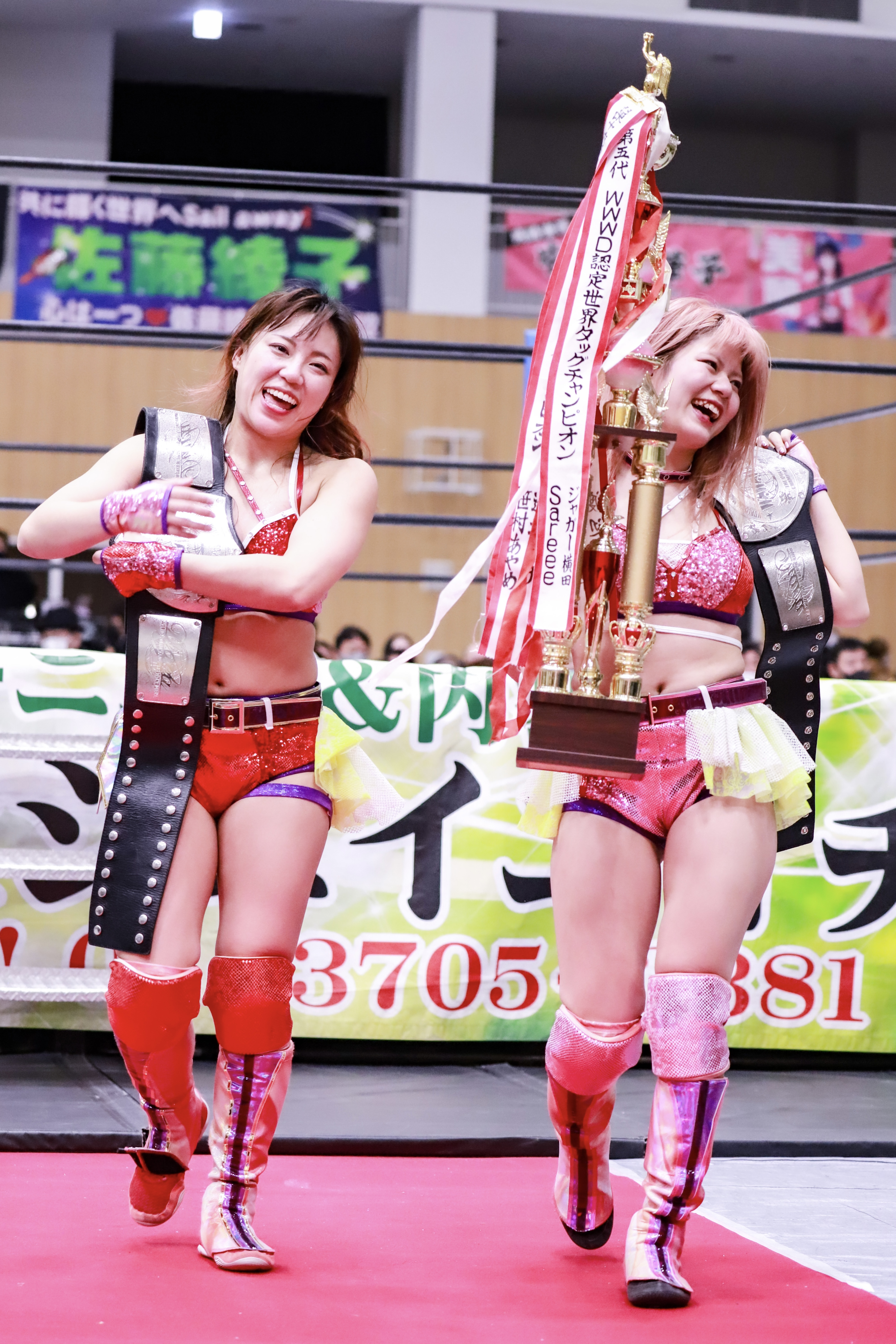
Umesaki is a three-time Diana Tag Team Champion...

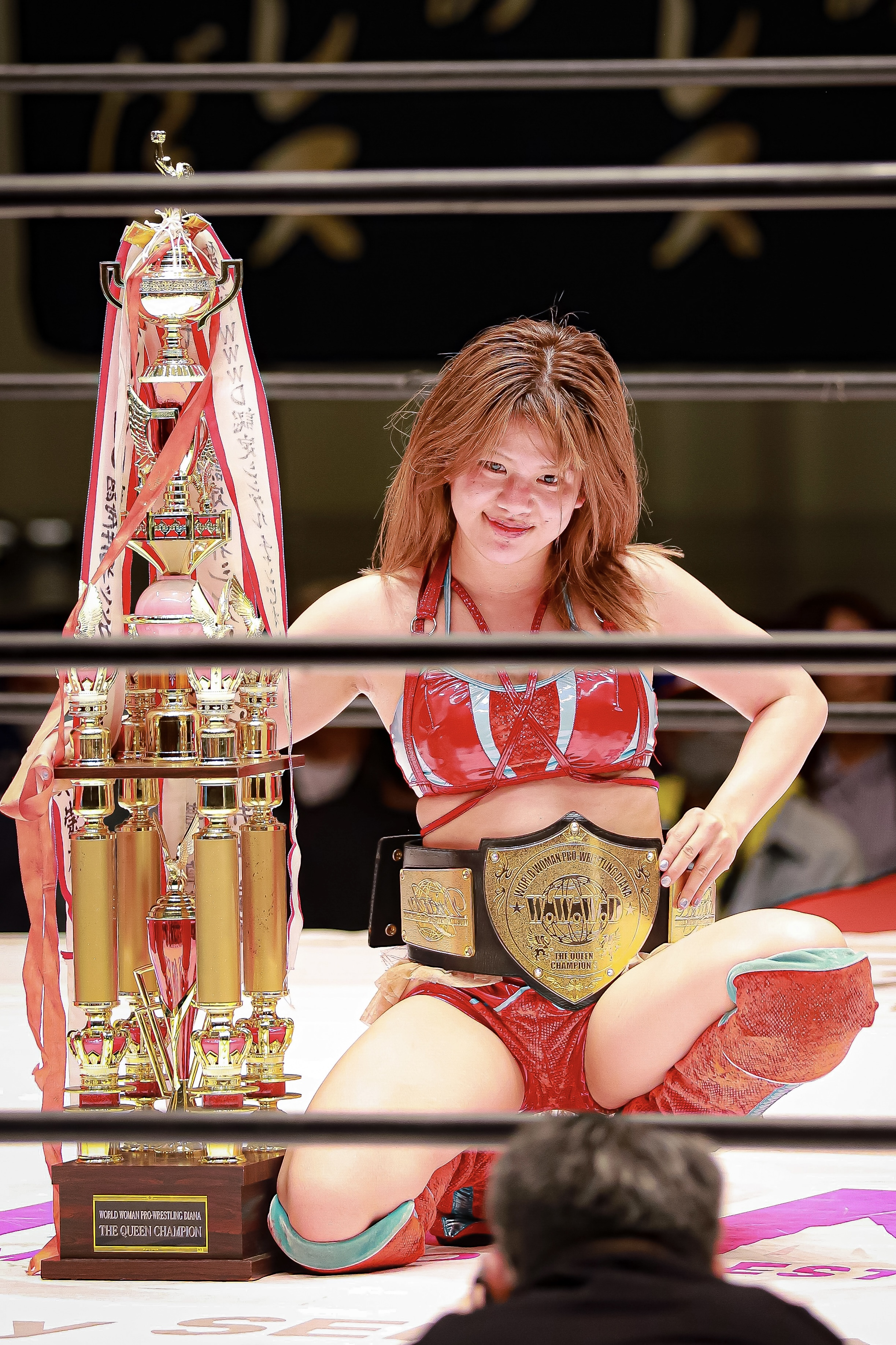
...and a Diana World Champion.

- DDT Pro-Wrestling
  - Ironman Heavymetalweight Championship (1 time)
- Pro Wrestling Illustrated
  - Ranked No. 116 of the top 250 female wrestlers in the PWI Women's 250 in 2024
- Pro Wrestling Wave
  - Wave Single Championship (1 time, current)
  - Wave Tag Team Championship (2 times) – with Miyuki Takase (1) and Honoka (1)
  - Catch the Wave (2026)
  - Catch the Wave Award (4 times)
    - Best Bout Award (2025) vs. Kaho Kobayashi on July 5, shared with Mio Shirai vs. Risa Sera on May 14
    - Best Performance Award (2022)
    - Fighting Spirit Award (2019) shared with Hamuko Hoshi and Maria
    - Outstanding Performance Award (2022)
- Pure-J
  - Princess of Pro-Wrestling Championship (1 time)
- Sendai Girls' Pro Wrestling
  - Jaja Uma Tournament (2021–2022)
- World Wonder Ring Stardom
  - New Blood Tag Team Championship (1 time, inaugural) – with Starlight Kid
  - Inaugural New Blood Tag Team Championship Tournament (2023) – with Starlight Kid
- World Woman Pro-Wrestling Diana
  - WWWD World Championship (3 times, current)
  - WWWD Tag Team Championship (4 times) – with Miyuki Takase (3); with Unagi Sayaka (1)
