= Ayako Sato =

Japanese professional wrestler

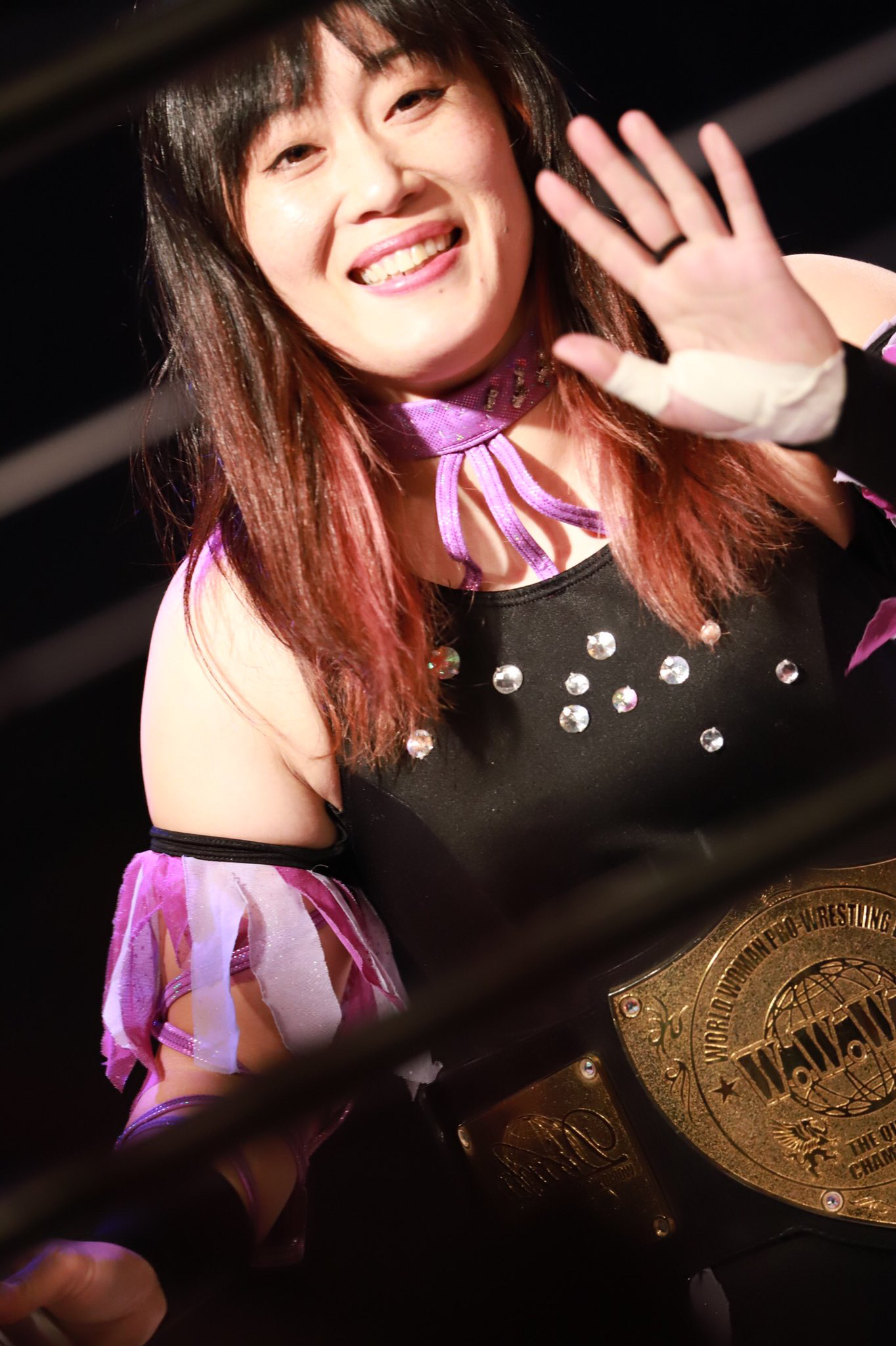
- Sato in October 2020

Personal information
- Born: January 4, 1986 (age 40) Shōnai, Yamagata, Japan

Professional wrestling career
- Ring names: Ayako Sato; Ryoko Sato
- Billed height: 154 cm (5 ft 1 in)
- Billed weight: 60 kg (132 lb)
- Trained by: Kaoru Ito
- Debut: October 28, 2001

Ayako Sato (佐藤綾子, Sato Ayako) (born January 4, 1986) is a Japanese professional wrestler currently signed to World Woman Pro-Wrestling Diana, where she is a member of the CRYSIS stable. She is also known for her time in the Japanese promotions JWP Joshi Puroresu and Pure-J.

== Professional wrestling career ==
=== All Japan Women's Pro-Wrestling (2001–2002) ===
Sato made her professional wrestling debut in All Japan Women's Pro-Wrestling on November 11, 2001, at AJW Garage Show, a house show where she teamed up with Tomoko Mori in a losing effort against Chiemi Kitagami and Saki Maemura as a result of a tag team match. During her two-year tenure with the promotion, she chased for only one title, that being the AJW Junior Championship, participating in a tournament for it where she unsuccessfully competed against Rena Takase, Emi Tojo and Mari Kuwada during the 2022 edition of the Japan Grand Prix between July 6 and July 19.

=== Independent circuit (2005–present) ===
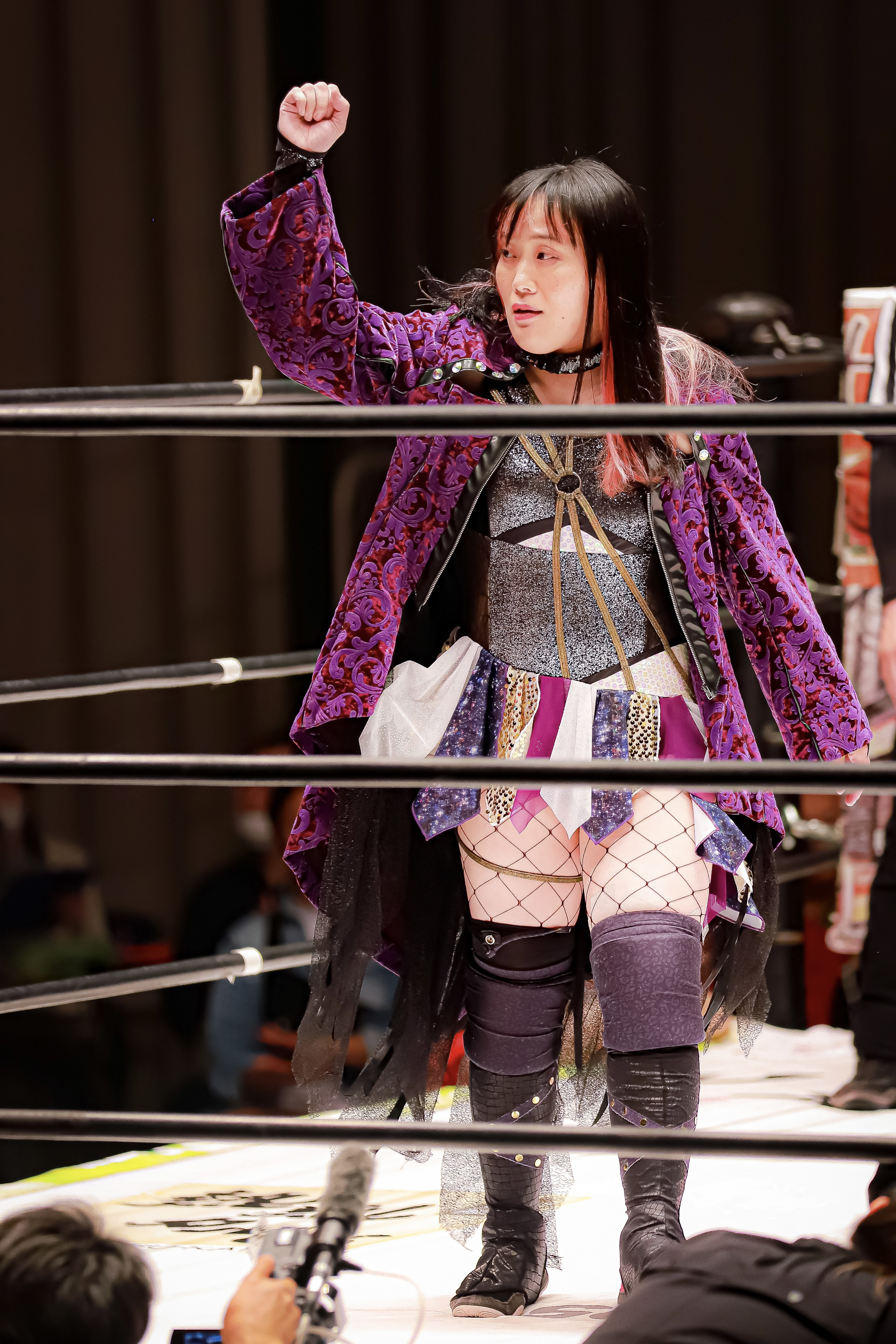
Sato in April 2023

During her freelancing work, Sato made appearances for various promotions from the Japanese independent scene. She has had a five-year tenure with NEO Japan Ladies Pro-Wrestling between 2005 and 2010. Her most notable competition took place at NEO Flare Up 2006 on September 17, where she teamed up with Kyoko Inoue and unsuccessfully challenged Amazing Kong and Kyoko Kimura for the NEO Tag Team Championship. She competed in one of Ice Ribbon's earliest events, the Ice Ribbon The Fifth Ice Ribbon Part 3 on September 9, 2006, where she teamed up with Misae Genki to defeat Aoi Kizuki and Ray. Sato competed at Devil Masami's Retirement Show, an independent event which took place on December 30, 2008, where she teamed up with Hanako Kobayashi to defeat Ray and Misaki Ohata.

Sato took a six-year hiatus from professional wrestling between 2011 and 2017. Sato competed in the 2020 edition of Pro Wrestling Wave's Dual Shock Wave tournament which took place under a format of tag team matches. She first teamed up with Sareee to defeat Sakura Hirota and Yuki Miyazaki on the first night from November 1, then on the final night from November 21, she competed in a scramble match won by Ayame Sasamura and also involving Haruka Umesaki, Miyuki Takase and Saki. At GLEAT G PROWRESTLING Ver. 9, an event promoted by Gleat on November 6, 2021, she unsuccessfully competed in a three-way match won by Madeline and also involving Michiko Miyagi. At Pure-J Climax 2021 on December 26, Sato teamed up with Megumi Yabushita and unsuccessfully challenged Hanako Nakamori and Arisa Nakajima for the Daily Sports Women's Tag Team Championship. At Zero1 Fukuoka Pro Wrestling Festival, an event promoted by Pro Wrestling Zero1 on October 9, 2022, she teamed up with Chihiro Hashimoto and Deborah K in a losing effort against Chie Ozora, Haruka Umesaki and Miyuki Takase.

=== JWP Joshi Puroresu (2006–2010) ===
Another promotion which Sato has had a brief tenure with was JWP Joshi Puroresu. She competed in the 2009 edition of the Natsu Onna Kettei Tournament where she fell short to Azumi Hyuga in the first rounds from August 2. At the 2010 edition, she teamed up with Hanako Kobayashi and fell short to Dynamite Kansai and Tsubasa Kuragaki in the first rounds from July 24. Sato competed for the Neo High Speed Championship against reigning champion Kaori Yoneyama on the first night of the JWP Climax of 2009 from December 6, coming up unsuccessfully in the process.

== Championships and accomplishments ==
- Pure-J
  - Daily Sports Women's Tag Team Championship (1 time) – with Hanako Nakamori
- World Woman Pro-Wrestling Diana
  - WWWD Tag Team Championship (5 times, current) – with Hanako Nakamori (3), Jaguar Yokota (1) and Debbie Keitel (1)
  - WWWD World Championship (3 times)
  - WWWD Queen Elizabeth Championship (1 time)
  - Second Triple Crown Champion
