= Progress Chapter 170: Wrestling Never Sleeps =

2024 Progress Wrestling event

- Promotional poster of the event
- Promotion: Progress Wrestling
- Date: August 26, 2024
- City: London, England
- Venue: Electric Ballroom
- Attendance: ~700

Event chronology
← Previous; Chapter 169: The Devil On My Shoulder	Next → Chapter 171: History Is Written By The Victors

The Progress Chapter 170: Wrestling Never Sleeps was a professional wrestling event produced by Progress Wrestling. It took place on August 26, 2024, in London, England at Electric Ballroom.

Eight matches were contested at the event. The main event saw Luke Jacobs defeat Kid Lykos to retain the PROGRESS World Championship.

== Production ==
=== Storylines ===
The event included matches that each resulted from scripted storylines, where wrestlers portrayed heroes, villains, or less distinguishable characters in scripted events that built tension and culminated in a wrestling match or series of matches. Results were predetermined by Progress' creative writers, while storylines were produced on Progress' events airing on the Demand PROGRESS streaming service.

The event also featured Tom Campbell as the guest ring announcer.

=== Event ===
The event started with the singles confrontation between Marcus Mathers and Leon Slater solded with the victory of the latter. Next up, Kanji, LA Taylor and Skye Smitson picked up a victory over Nina Samuels, Debbie Keitel and Lena Kross in six-woman tag team competition. In the third bout, Man Like DeReiss defeated Gene Munny and Zozaya in a three-way match. The fourth bout saw Kenta defeating Ricky Knight Jr. to secure the seventh consecutive defense of the DEFY World Championship in that respective reign. Next up, Rhio defeated Session Moth Martina to secure the twelfth consecutive defense of the Progress Wrestling World Women's Championship in that respective reign. The sixth match saw Eddie Dennis defeating Tate Mayfairs score (2–1) as a result of a two-out-of-three falls match. In the semi main event, Big Damo and Axel Tischer defeated Chuck Mambo and TK Cooper to secure the fourth consecutive defense of the PROGRESS Tag Team Championship in that respective reign.

The event presented the return of Cara Noir who was announced to compete at Chapter 171: History Is Written By The Victors.

In the main event, Luke Jacobs defeated Kid Lykos to secure the second consecutive defense of the PROGRESS World Championship in that respective reign.

== Results ==
No.	Results	Stipulations	Times
1	Leon Slater defeated Marcus Mathers by pinfall	Singles match	—
2	Kanji and The Experience (LA Taylor and Skye Smitson) defeated Nina Samuels, Debbie Keitel and Lena Kross by pinfall	Six-woman tag team match	—
3	Man Like DeReiss defeated Gene Munny and Zozaya by pinfall	Three-way match	11:02
4	Kenta (c) defeated Ricky Knight Jr. by pinfall	Singles match for the DEFY World Championship	9:58
5	Rhio (c) defeated Session Moth Martina by pinfall	Singles match for the Progress Wrestling World Women's Championship	10:09
6	Eddie Dennis defeated Tate Mayfairs score (2–1)	Two-out-of-three falls match	17:44
7	Sanity (Big Damo and Axel Tischer) (c) defeated Smokin' Aces (Charlie Sterling and Nick Riley) and Sunshine Machine (Chuck Mambo and TK Cooper) by pinfall	Three-way tag team match for the PROGRESS Tag Team Championship	10:26
8	Luke Jacobs (c) defeated Kid Lykos by pinfall	Singles match for the PROGRESS World Championship	22:21
(c) / – the champion(s) heading into the match
