= World Woman Pro-Wrestling Diana World Championship =

Women's professional wrestling championship

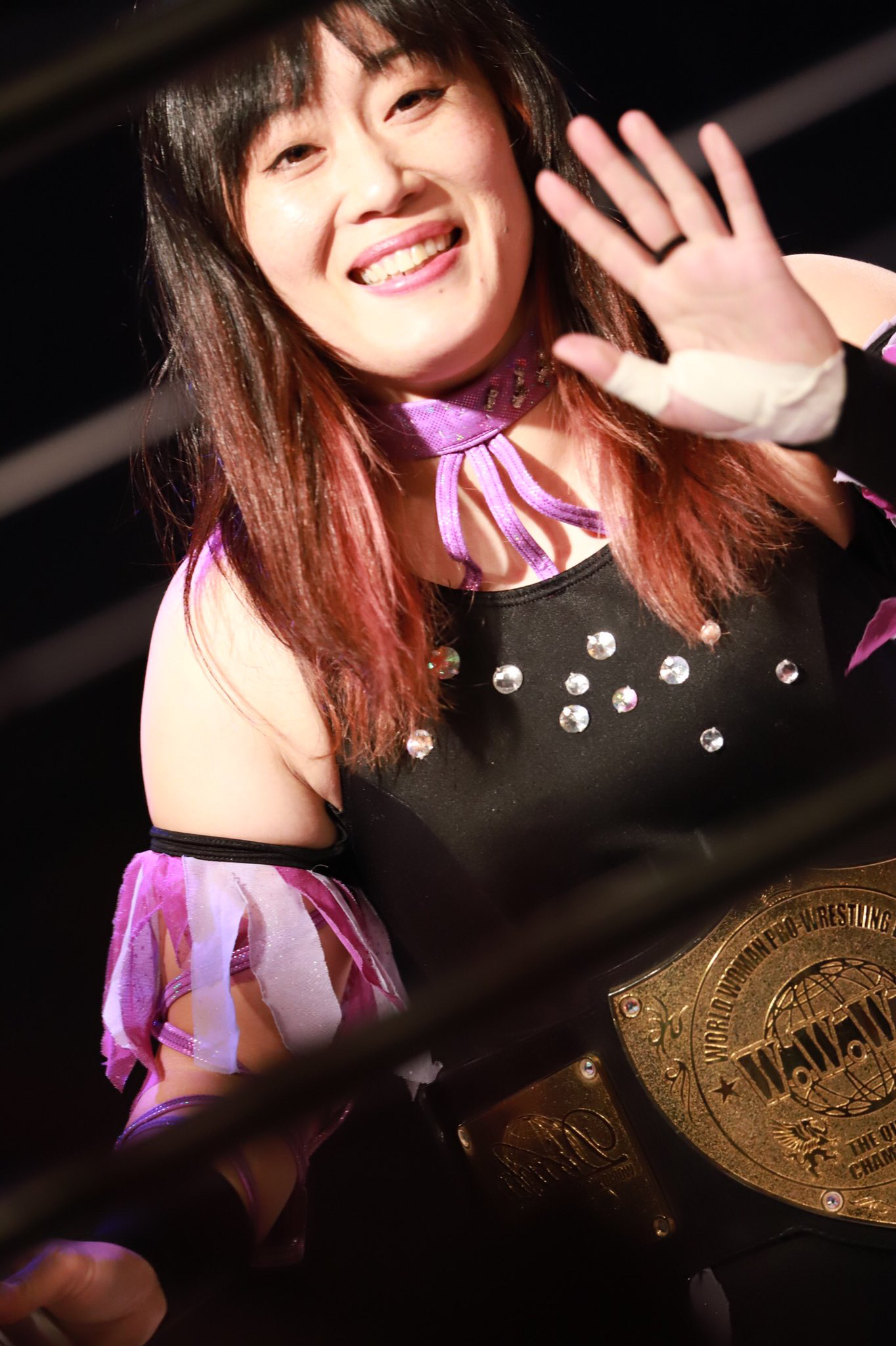
- Ayako Sato with the title belt in August 2019

Details
- Promotion: World Woman Pro-Wrestling Diana
- Date established: April 29, 2013
- Current champion: Haruka Umesaki
- Date won: April 19, 2026
Statistics
- First champion: Kyoko Inoue
- Most reigns: Kyoko Inoue (4 reigns)
- Longest reign: Kyoko Inoue (3rd reign, 511 days)
- Shortest reign: Asuka (42 days)
- Oldest champion: Kyoko Inoue (51 years, 361 days)
- Youngest champion: Haruka Umesaki (22 years, 81 days)
- Heaviest champion: Kaoru Ito and Kyoko Inoue (238 lbs)
- Lightest champion: Haruka Umesaki (119 lbs)

The World Woman Pro-Wrestling Diana World Championship (often known as the WWWD Certified World Singles Championship) is a women's professional wrestling championship promoted by the Japanese professional wrestling promotions World Woman Pro-Wrestling Diana. During its existence, the title has been promoted by various other promotions such as Pro Wrestling Wave or World Wonder Ring Stardom while held by certain wrestlers who were part of other promotions.

Like most professional wrestling championships, the title is won as a result of a scripted match. There have been a total of 21 reigns and two vacancy shared between 12 different champions. The current champion is Haruka Umesaki who is in her third reign.

== Title history ==
On April 29, 2013, Kyoko Inoue, the founder of Diana, became the inaugural champion by defeating Jaime D during the main event of Diana's second anniversary show. On November 20, 2021, Inoue who was in her fourth reign vacated the championship after sustaining an injury. On January 23, 2022, Nagisa Nozaki defeated a former titleholder Ayako Sato to win the vacant championship.

== Reigns ==
As of November 3, 2026, there have been a total of 22 reigns shared between 14 different champions and one vacancy. Kyoko Inoue was the inaugural champion. She also holds the record for most reigns at four. Inoue the oldest champion at 51 years old, while Haruka Umesaki is the youngest at 22. Inoue's third reign is the longest at 511 days, while Asuka's reign is the shortest at 42 days. The current champion is Haruka Umesaki who defeated Debbie Keitel on April 19, 2026, in Tokyo, Japan.

Key
No.	Overall reign number
Reign	Reign number for the specific champion
Days	Number of days held
Defenses	Number of successful defenses
+	Current reign is changing daily

No.	Champion	Championship change			Reign statistics			Notes	Ref.
No.	Champion	Date	Event	Location	Reign	Days	Defenses	Notes	Ref.
1	Kyoko Inoue	April 29, 2013	Diana 2nd Anniversary ~ Danger Zone	Kawasaki, Kanagawa, Japan	1	244	3	Defeated Jaime D to become the inaugural champion.	
2	Mask de Sun	December 29, 2013	Diana	Kawasaki, Kanagawa, Japan	1	98	0		
3	Manami Toyota	April 6, 2014	Diana	Kawasaki, Kanagawa, Japan	1	261	1		
4	Kaoru Ito	December 23, 2014	Kawasaki Legend	Kawasaki, Kanagawa, Japan	1	267	2		
5	Kyoko Inoue	September 16, 2015	Diana	Tokyo, Japan	2	424	0		
6	Kaoru Ito	November 13, 2016	Diana	Tokyo, Japan	2	105	1		
7	Kyoko Inoue	February 26, 2017	Diana	Tokyo, Japan	3	511	1		
8	Sareee	July 22, 2018	River's Edge	Kawasaki, Kanagawa, Japan	1	151	0		
9	Aja Kong	December 20, 2018	Diana	Tokyo, Japan	1	143	1		
10	Sareee	May 12, 2019	Diana 8th Anniversary	Tokyo, Japan	2	237	1		
11	Ayako Sato	January 4, 2020	Diana	Yokohama, Japan	1	239	0		
12	Asuka	August 30, 2020	Diana	Tokyo, Japan	1	42	0		
13	Ayako Sato	October 11, 2020	Diana	Tokyo, Japan	2	189	1		
14	Kyoko Inoue	April 18, 2021	Diana 10th Anniversary	Kawasaki, Kanagawa, Japan	4	216	1		
—	Vacated	November 20, 2021	—	—	—	—	—	Kyoko Inoue vacated the championship after sustained an injury.	
15	Nagisa Nozaki	January 23, 2022	Diana	Kawasaki, Kanagawa, Japan	1	96	1	Defeated Ayako Sato to win the vacant championship.	
16	Ayako Sato	April 29, 2022	Korakuen Hall Vol. 1	Tokyo, Japan	3	365	3		
17	Haruka Umesaki	April 29, 2023	Diana	Tokyo, Japan	1	474	5		
18	Maika Ozaki	August 15, 2024	Diana	Kawasaki, Japan	1	87	2		
19	Ayame Sasamura	November 10, 2024	Diana	Kawasaki, Japan	1	70	2		
20	Hiragi Kurumi	January 19, 2025	Diana	Tokyo, Japan	1	49	1		
21	Risa Sera	March 9, 2025	Diana	Kawasaki, Japan	1	153	2		
22	Haruka Umesaki	August 9, 2025	Diana	Kawasaki, Japan	2	127	3		
—	Vacated	December 14, 2025	—	—	—	—	—	Haruka Umesaki vacated the championship after defeating Debbie Keitel.	
23	Debbie Keitel	January 24, 2026	Diana	Kawasaki, Japan	1	85	2	Defeated Nanami Hatano to win the vacant title.	
24	Haruka Umesaki	April 19, 2026	Diana Season 2 - 2nd Leg 15th Anniversary No. 2	Tokyo, Japan	3	198+	2		

== Combined reigns ==
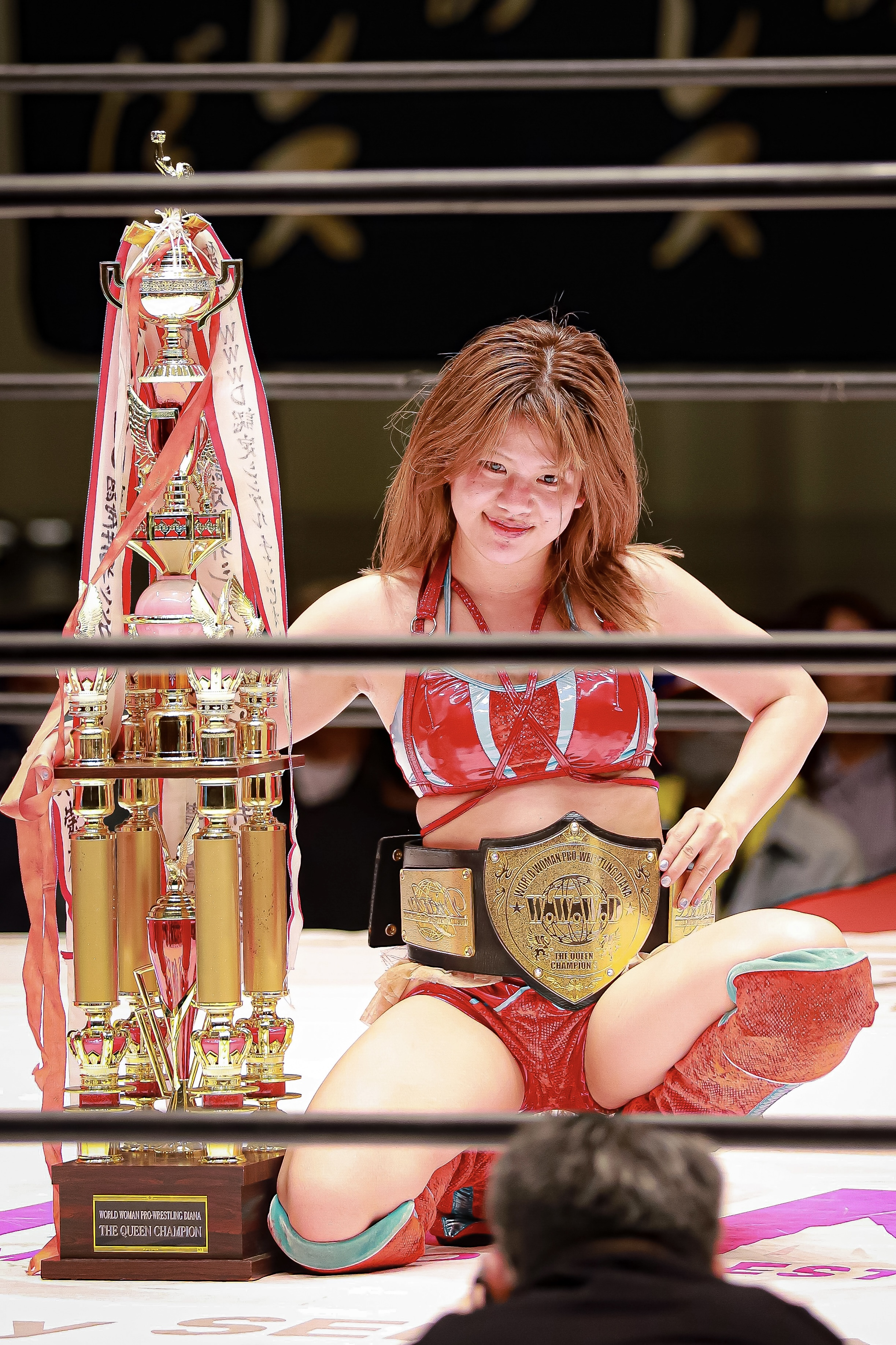
Three-time and current champion, Haruka Umesaki.

As of November 3, 2026.

†	Indicates the current champion

Rank	Wrestler	No. of reigns	Combined defenses	Combined days
1	Kyoko Inoue	4	5	1,395
2	Haruka Umesaki †	3	9	799+
3	Ayako Sato	3	4	794
4	Sareee	2	1	388
5	Kaoru Ito	2	3	372
6	Manami Toyota	1	1	261
7	Risa Sera	1	2	153
8	Aja Kong	1	1	143
9	Mask de Sun	1	0	98
10	Nagisa Nozaki	1	1	96
11	Maika Ozaki	1	2	87
12	Debbie Keitel	1	2	85
13	Ayame Sasamura	1	2	70
14	Hiragi Kurumi	1	1	49
15	Asuka	1	0	42
