= World Woman Pro-Wrestling Diana =

Japanese professional wrestling promotion

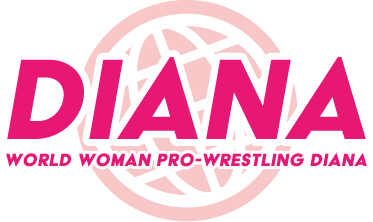
- Official logo of the promotion (2022–present)
- Acronym: Diana
- Founded: July 29, 2010
- Style: Joshi puroresu
- Headquarters: Kawasaki, Kanagawa, Japan
- Founder: Kyoko Inoue
- Owner: Kyoko Inoue
- Predecessor: NEO Japan Ladies Pro-Wrestling
- Website: Official website

World Woman Pro-Wrestling Diana (ワールド女子プロレス・ディアナ, Wārudo Joshi Puroresu Diana) often abbreviated simply as Diana is a Japanese joshi puroresu or women's professional wrestling promotion based in Kawasaki, Kanagawa, Japan. It was founded by Kyoko Inoue in 2010.

== History ==
On July 29, 2010, Kyoko Inoue, who had left NEO Japan Ladies Pro-Wrestling, established World Women's Pro-Wrestling Diana Co., Ltd. with the aim of launching a professional wrestling organization. Kaoru Ito, who at the time was a junior at All Japan Women's Pro-Wrestling, organized the first event of the promotion, the "Diana Debut Show" on April 14, 2011. Furthermore, Ayako Sato joined the company for the first event. In the process Diana accepted two new trainees and they also recruited athletes from abroad, even contracting American wrestlers. In the beginning, their business was going well but athletes and trainees who belonged to other promotions left one after another. Their training base, "Komazawa World" arena was closed down and they had to reconsider their tour style and relocating. In April 2018, they moved their dojo (a martial arts gym and a training base) to Kawasaki city, Kanagawa Prefecture.

In 2012, it was announced that the dojo would be relocated. In the background, the Komazawa World Arena was jointly owned by Inoue and Kagoo, the director who resigned in June (the top page of the Komazawa World Arena official website specified "Kagoo and Inoue" as contact information). The opening of the new dojo was announced at the end of September, but the scheduled date has passed without any new information. After that, instead of the canceled "Arena Match", the Kitazawa Town Hall was used as the main venue, and the performance was held once a month from December. Even after Diana withdrew, Komazawa World Arena remained and there was talk of holding a performance, but it was closed without being realized. Affiliated players who lost their dojo were practicing at Pro Wrestling Zero1's dojo, the "Takeshiba Colosseum" and shoot boxing gyms.

Over the years, the promotion has established partnerships with various promotions from the Japanese independent scene. They started a professional relationship with World Wonder Ring Stardom at the beginning of 2022, sending various wrestlers from the roster to compete in rookie-based pay-per-views promoted by the latter promotion under the brand of "New Blood". Diana was first represented by Nanami and Haruka Umesaki at Stardom New Blood 1 on March 11, 2022.

== Roster ==
This is a list of professional wrestlers who currently wrestle for the company. Alumni and notable guest superstars are also included.

=== Active ===
Ring name	Real name	Notes
Ayako Sato	Ayako Sato	World Woman Pro-Wrestling Diana Queen Elizabeth Champion
Ayame Sasamura	Ayame Sasamura	Signed to Active Advance Pro Wrestling
Cherry	Unknown	Freelancer
Chikayo Nagashima	Chikayo Nagashima	Freelancer
Debbie Keitel	Kaydell Joyce	Freelancer
Hanako Nakamori	Hanako Kobayashi	Signed to Pure-J
Haruka Umesaki	Haruka Umesaki	World Woman Pro-Wrestling Diana World Champion; World Woman Pro-Wrestling Diana Tag Team Champion
Himiko	Unknown	
Hiragi Kurumi	Hiragi Kurumi	Freelancer
Jaguar Yokota	Rimi Yokota	
Kaori Yoneyama	Kaori Yoneyama	Freelancer
Kawasaki Rainbow Girl	Unknown	
Kyoko Inoue	Kyoko Inoue	Founder
Maika Ozaki	Maika Ozaki	Freelancer
Madeline	Madoka Ishibashi	
Miran	Unknown	World Woman Pro-Wrestling Diana Crystal Champion
Mizuki Kato	Unknown	
Nanami	Unknown	
Rina Amikura	Unknown	Freelancer
Risa Sera	Risa Okuda	Freelancer
Sakura Hirota	Sakura Hirota	Freelancer
Takako Inoue	Takako Inoue	Signed to Ladies Legend Pro Wrestling-X
Unagi Sayaka	Unagi Sayaka	Freelancer; World Woman Pro-Wrestling Diana Tag Team Champion
Yuki Miyazaki	Yuki Miyazaki	Signed to Pro Wrestling Wave

=== Alumni/guests ===
- Aja Kong
- Akari
- Asuka
- Ayame Sasamura
- Banny Oikawa
- Chie Ozora
- Chikayo Nagashima
- Dash Chisako
- Hanako Nakamori
- Kakeru Sekiguchi
- Kaoru
- Kaoru Ito
- Keiko Aono
- Kohaku
- Kyoko Kimura
- Manami
- Manami Toyota
- Megumi Yabushita
- Mima Shimoda
- Nagisa Nozaki
- Rin Kadokura
- Rina Amikura
- Rina Shingaki
- Sae
- Sakura Hirota
- Sareee
- Sendai Sachiko
- Takako Inoue
- Tomoko Watanabe
- Yappy
- Yuki Miyazaki
- Yumi Ohka
- Yumiko Hotta

== Championships ==
As of October 4, 2026.

Championship	Current champion(s)	Reign	Date won	Days held	Location	Notes
Diana World Championship	Haruka Umesaki	3	April 19, 2026	168+	Tokyo, Japan	Defeated Debbie Keitel at Diana Season 2 - 2nd Leg 15th Anniversary No. 2.
Diana Queen Elizabeth Championship	Yumi Ohka	2	August 1, 2026	64+	Tokyo, Japan	Defeated Ayako Sato and Mochi Natsumi in a three-way match at WAVE Nami 1.
Diana Tag Team Championship	Ayaka (Ayako Sato and Hanako Nakamori)	3 (5, 3)	July 5, 2026	91+	Kawasaki, Japan	Defeated Chobuki (Haruka Umesaki and Unagi Sayaka) at Diana Season 3 - 1st Leg 15th Anniversary NO. 3.
Diana Crystal Championship	Vacant	-	-	-	Kawasaki, Japan	Miran was forced to reliquish the title after completing her third defense at Diana Season 3 - 1st Leg 15th Anniversary NO. 3.

=== World Woman Pro-Wrestling Diana Crystal Championship ===
World Woman Pro-Wrestling Diana Crystal Championship

Details
- Promotion: Diana
- Date established: December 2023
- Current champion: Vacant
Statistics
- First champion: Nanami
- Most reigns: All titleholders (1 reign)
- Longest reign: Nanami (456 days)
- Shortest reign: Mizuki Kato (50 days)
- Oldest champion: Mizuki Kato (27 years and 1 month)
- Youngest champion: Miran (16 years, 3 months and 3 days)
- Heaviest champion: Mizuki Kato (211 lbs)
- Lightest champion: Miran (82 lbs)

The World Woman Pro-Wrestling Diana Crystal Championship is the tertiary singles women's professional wrestling championship promoted by World Woman Pro-Wrestling Diana. The inaugural champion was crowned on January 6, 2024, when Nanami defeated Miran in the finals of an eight-woman single-elimination tournament. In order for a wrestler to challenge for the title, they must be under twenty-five years old or have less than three years of experience in professional wrestling. The title holder can only defend it three-times before relinquishing it. There have been a total of four reigns shared between four different champions and one vacancy. Nanami has the longest reign at 456 days, while Mizuki Kato has the shortest at 50 days. Mizuki Kato is the oldest at 27, while Miran is the youngest at 16. The title is currently vacant as of July 5, 2026.

Key
No.	Overall reign number
Reign	Reign number for the specific champion
Days	Number of days held
Defenses	Number of successful defenses
<1	Reign lasted less than a day
+	Current reign is changing daily

No.	Champion	Championship change			Reign statistics			Notes	Ref.
No.	Champion	Date	Event	Location	Reign	Days	Defenses	Notes	Ref.
1	Nanami	January 6, 2024	Diana Future Sight Vol. 17	Kawasaki, Japan	1	456	3	Defeated Miran in a tournament final to become the inaugural champion.	
—	Vacated	April 6, 2025	Diana	Kawasaki, Japan	—	—	—	Vacated after Nanami won the World Woman Pro-Wrestling Diana Tag Team Championship.	
2	Honoka	April 27, 2025	Diana	Tokyo, Japan	1	90	0	Defeated Soy in the finals of the 2025 Crystal Tournament to win the vacant title.	
3	Mizuki Kato	July 26, 2025	Diana Future Sight Vol. 36	Kawasaki, Japan	1	50	1		
4	Miran	September 14, 2025	Diana Future Sight ~ Miran Homecoming Show	Itabashi, Japan	1	295	3		
—	Vacated	July 5, 2026	Diana Season 3 - 1st Leg 15th Anniversary NO. 3	Kawasaki, Japan	—	—	—	Vacated after Miran defeated CoCo and successfully defended the title for the third time.	

== Accomplishments ==
In World Women Pro-Wrestling Diana (WWWD), the Triple Crown consists of three titles promoted by the company. They are the WWWD World Championship, the WWWD Queen Elizabeth Championship, and the WWWD Tag Team Championship. On August 24, 2019, during the Summer Attack event, Kyoko Inoue became the first Triple Crown Champion in WWWD’s history

Text
Dates in **bold**	The date the wrestler completed the Triple Crown

Champion	Primary championship	Tag team championship	Divisional championship
Champion	WWWD World Championship	WWWD Tag Team Championship	WWWD Queen Elizabeth Championship
Kyoko Inoue	April 29, 2013	December 15, 2013 (with Tomoko Watanabe)	**August 24, 2019**
Ayako Sato	January 4, 2020	July 22, 2018 (with Jaguar Yokota)	**January 24, 2026**

== See also ==
- Professional wrestling in Japan
- List of professional wrestling promotions in Japan
