= World Woman Pro-Wrestling Diana Queen Elizabeth Championship =

Women's professional wrestling championship

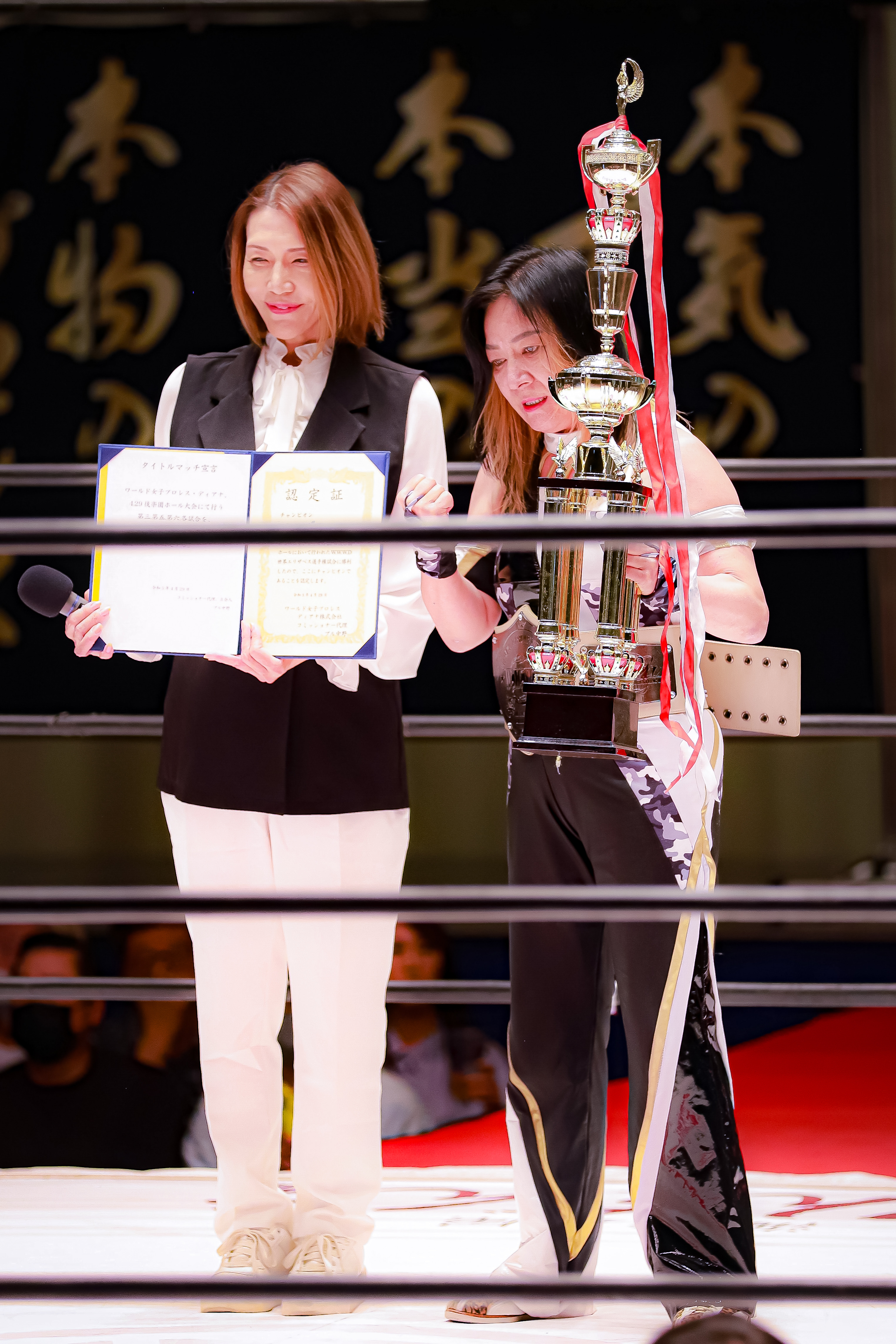
- Jaguar Yokota (right) with the current design of the title in 2023

Details
- Promotion: World Woman Pro-Wrestling Diana
- Date established: October 10, 2016
- Current champion: Yumi Ohka
- Date won: August 1, 2026
Statistics
- First champion: Jaguar Yokota
- Most reigns: Sakura Hirota (5 reigns)
- Longest reign: Jaguar Yokota (1,048 days)
- Shortest reign: Leon (5 days)
- Oldest champion: Jaguar Yokota (60 years, 278 days)
- Youngest champion: Kaori Yoneyama (40 years, 217 days)
- Heaviest champion: Kyoko Inoue (238 lbs)
- Lightest champion: Kaori Yoneyama (125 lbs)

The World Woman Pro-Wrestling Diana Queen Elizabeth Championship is the secondary singles women's professional wrestling championship promoted by the Japanese professional wrestling promotion World Woman Pro-Wrestling Diana. The main characteristic of the title is that it can only be contested in three-way matches and the contestants must be over age 40.

Like most professional wrestling championships, the title is won as a result of a scripted match. There have been a total of twenty reigns and one vacancy shared between nine different champions. The current champion is Yumi Ohka.

== Title history ==
On October 10, 2016, Jaguar Yokota became the inaugural champion by defeating Kaoru and Mima Shimoda in a three-way match. Yokota's first reign lasted for nearly three years, 1,048 days, before losing the title on August 24, 2019, to Kyoko Inoue in a three-way match that also involved Sakura Hirota, setting the record for the longest reign over the championship's history. The title was also featured outside Diana, most noticeably on Pro Wrestling Wave.

== Reigns ==
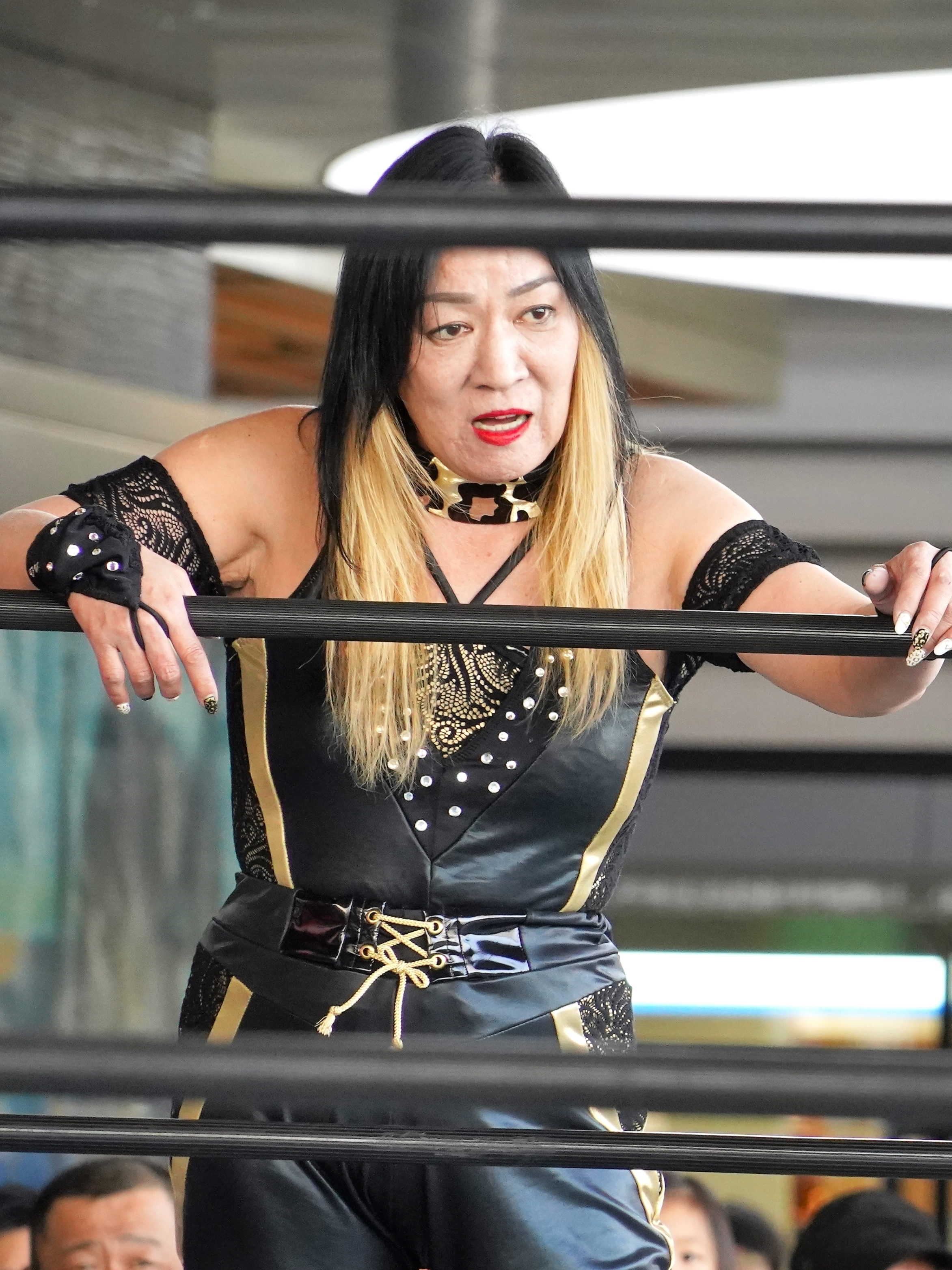
Inaugural and longest champion, Jaguar Yokota.

As of September 28, 2026, there have been 12 reigns between six champions. Jaguar Yokota was the inaugural champion. Sakura Hirota has the most reigns at four. Yokota's first reign is the longest at 1,048 days, while Hirota's second reign is the shortest at 11 days. Yokota is the oldest champion at 60 years old, while Kaori Yoneyama is the youngest at 40 years old.

The current champion is Yumi Ohka who is in her second reign. She defeated Ayako Sato and Mochi Natsumi on August 1, 2026, in Tokyo, Japan.

Key
No.	Overall reign number
Reign	Reign number for the specific champion
Days	Number of days held
Defenses	Number of successful defenses
+	Current reign is changing daily

No.	Champion	Championship change			Reign statistics			Notes	Ref.
No.	Champion	Date	Event	Location	Reign	Days	Defenses	Notes	Ref.
1	Jaguar Yokota	October 10, 2016	Diana	Tokyo, Japan	1	1,048	4	Defeated Kaoru and Mima Shimoda in a three-way match to become the inaugural champion.	
2	Kyoko Inoue	August 24, 2019	Summer Attack	Kawasaki, Japan	1	161	1	This was a three-way match, also involving Sakura Hirota.	
3	Sakura Hirota	February 1, 2020	Nami☆1	Tokyo, Japan	1	211	3	This was a three-way match, also involving Yuki Miyazaki. This was also a Pro Wrestling Wave event.	
4	Jaguar Yokota	August 30, 2020	Diana	Tokyo, Japan	2	386	2	This was a three-way match, also involving Kyoko Inoue.	
5	Sakura Hirota	September 20, 2021	Diana	Yokohama, Japan	2	11	0	This was a three-way match, also involving Yumi Ohka.	
6	Yumi Ohka	October 1, 2021	Marvelous/Wave Fusion ~ Tommy 40th Anniversary	Tokyo, Japan	1	61	1	This was a three-way match, also involving Tomoko Watanabe. This was also a collaboration event between Marvelous That's Women Pro Wrestling and Pro Wrestling Wave.	
7	Kaori Yoneyama	December 1, 2021	Nami☆1	Tokyo, Japan	1	31	1	This was a three-way match, also involving Yappy. This was also a Pro Wrestling Wave event.	
8	Yuki Miyazaki	January 1, 2022	Nami☆1 ~ Have a Nice Wave	Tokyo, Japan	1	106	1	This was a three-way match, also involving Miss Mongol. This was also a Pro Wrestling Wave event.	
9	Sakura Hirota	April 17, 2022	Happy Birthday Wave ~ Sakurasaku	Tokyo, Japan	3	12	0	This was a three-way match, also involving Kaori Yoneyama. This was also a Pro Wrestling Wave event.	
10	Jaguar Yokota	April 29, 2022	Korakuen Hall Vol. 1	Tokyo, Japan	3	639	4	This was a three-way match, also involving Drake Morimatsu.	
11	Kyoko Inoue	January 28, 2024	Diana	Kawasaki, Japan	2	33	1	This was a three-way match, also involving Sakura Hirota.	
12	Sakura Hirota	March 1, 2024	Nami☆1	Kawasaki, Japan	4	16	0	This was a three-way match, also involving Yuki Miyazaki. This was also a Pro Wrestling Wave event.	
13	Kaori Yoneyama	March 18, 2024	WAVE Osaka Rhapsody Vol. 60	Osaka, Japan	2	12	0	This was a three-way match, also involving Cherry. This was a Pro Wrestling Wave event.	
14	Leon	March 18, 2024	YMZ Gokigen Kawasaki #69	Kawasaki, Japan	1	5	0	This was a three-way match, also involving Cherry. This was a YMZ Pro Wrestling event.	
15	Cherry	April 3, 2024	WAVE NAMI 1	Kawasaki, Japan	1	11	0	This was a three-way match, also involving Kaori Yoneyama. This was a Pro Wrestling Wave event.	
16	Sakura Hirota	April 14, 2024	WAVE Detras De Lazona Vol. 18	Kawasaki, Japan	5	21	2	This was a three-way match, also involving Yuki Miyazaki. This was a Pro Wrestling Wave event.	
17	Chikayo Nagashima	May 5, 2024	WAVE Catch The WAVE 2024 Opening Round	Tokyo, Japan	1	33	0	This was a three-way match, also involving Cherry from the 2024 Catch the Wave blocks.	
18	Yuki Miyazaki	June 7, 2024	WAVE Kabukicho Weekender '24	Tokyo, Japan	2	65	1	This was a three-way match, also involving Sakura Hirota from the 2024 Catch the Wave blocks.	
19	Kyoko Inoue	August 11, 2024	Diana	Kawasaki, Japan	3	490	7	This was a three-way match also involving Himiko.	
—	Vacated	December 14, 2025	Diana	Kawasaki, Japan	—	—	—	Kyoko Inoue vacated the championship after defeating Himiko and Jaguar Yokota.	
20	Ayako Sato	January 24, 2026	Diana	Kawasaki, Japan	1	189	2	Defeated Kaori Yoneyama and Yumi Ohka in a three-way match to win the vacant title.	
21	Yumi Ohka	August 1, 2026	WAVE Nami 1	Tokyo, Japan	2	58+	2	This was a three-way match also involving Mochi Natsumi.	

== Combined reigns ==
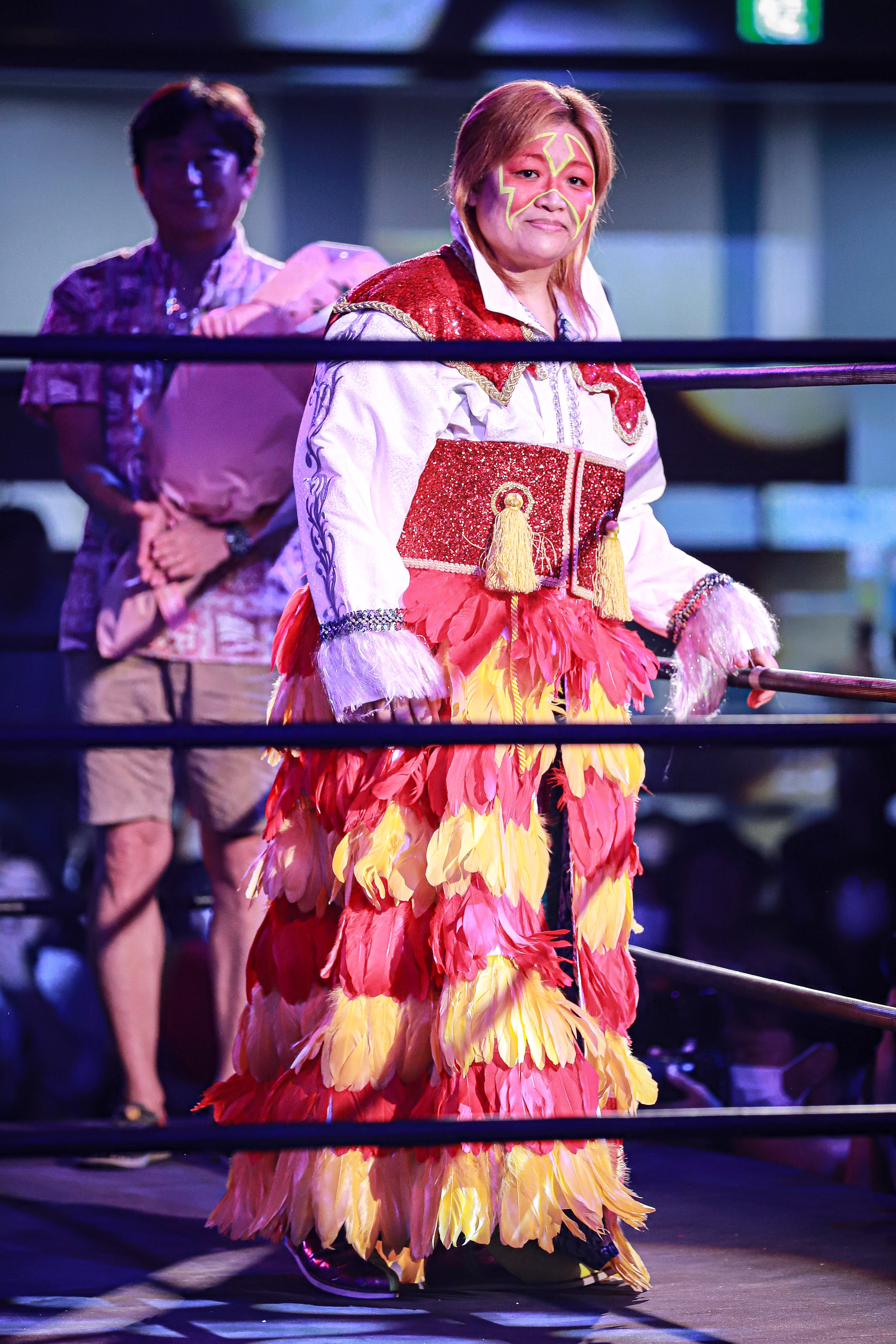
Three-time and former champion, Kyoko Inoue.

As of September 28, 2026.

†	Indicates the current champion

Rank	Wrestler	No. of reigns	Combined defenses	Combined days
1	Jaguar Yokota	3	10	2,073
2	Kyoko Inoue	3	10	684
3	Sakura Hirota	5	5	272
4	Ayako Sato	1	2	189
5	Yuki Miyazaki	2	2	171
6	Yumi Ohka †	2	3	119+
7	Kaori Yoneyama	2	1	42
8	Chikayo Nagashima	1	0	33
9	Cherry	1	0	11
10	Leon	1	0	5
