= World Woman Pro-Wrestling Diana Tag Team Championship =

Professional wrestling women's tag team championship

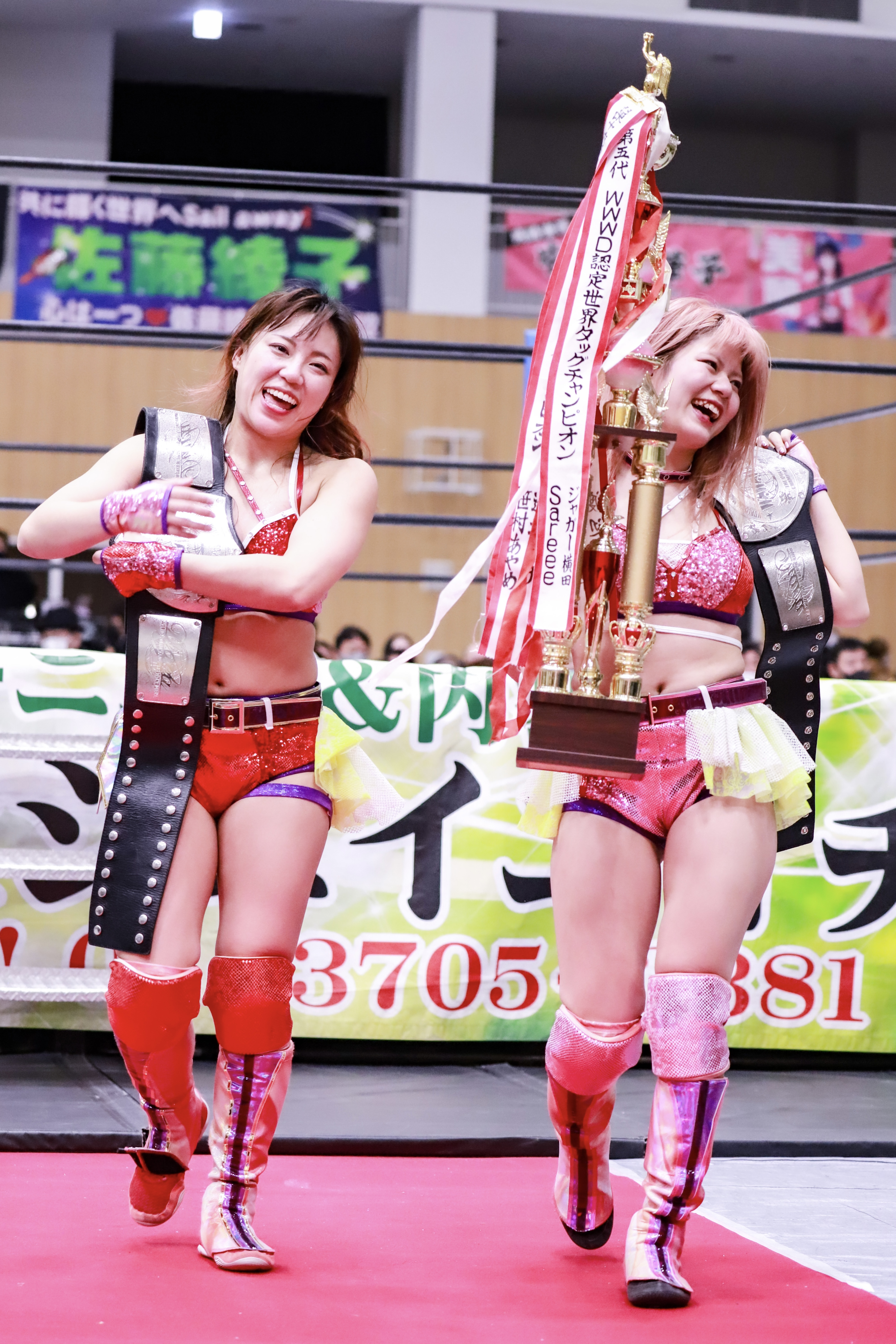
- Miyuki Takase and Haruka Umesaki with the title belts in January 2023

Details
- Promotion: World Woman Pro-Wrestling Diana
- Date established: December 15, 2012
- Current champions: Ayaka (Ayako Sato and Hanako Nakamori)
- Date won: July 5, 2026
Statistics
- First champions: Kaoru Ito and Tomoko Watanabe
- Most reigns: As a team (3 reigns): Luminous (Haruka Umesaki and Miyuki Takase); Ayaka (Ayako Sato and Hanako Nakamori); As individual (5 reigns): Ayako Sato
- Longest reign: Kaoru Ito and Tomoko Watanabe (512 days)
- Shortest reign: Sakura Hirota and Yumi Ohka (<1 day)
- Oldest champion: Jaguar Yokota (56 years, 362 days)
- Youngest champion: Nanami (18 years, 246 days)
- Heaviest champion: Kaoru Ito (238 lb (108 kg))

The World Woman Pro-Wrestling Diana Tag Team Championship is the primary tag team title in the Japanese professional wrestling promotion World Woman Pro-Wrestling Diana. The title was introduced in 2013. There have been a total of twenty-two reigns shared between nineteen different teams consisting of twenty-seven distinctive champions and four vacancies.

Like most professional wrestling championships, the title is won as a result of a scripted match. The current title holders are Ayaka (Ayako Sato and Hanako Nakamori) who are in their third reign as a team.

== Title history ==
On December 15, 2012, Diana announced the establishment of the Tag Team Championship, with a tournament to be held in the following month to crown the first champions. On January 28, 2013, Kaoru Ito and Tomoko Watanabe became the inaugural champions after defeating Kyoko Inoue and Sareee in a tournament final.

== Reigns ==
As of November 3, 2026, there have been 26 reigns between 21 teams composed of 30 individual champions and four vacancies. Kaoru Ito and Tomoko Watanabe were the inaugural champions. Luminous (Haruka Umesaki and Miyuki Takase) and Ayaka (Ayako Sato and Hanako Nakamori) holds the record for most reigns as a team at three, while individually, Ayako Sato has the most reigns at five. Ito and Watanabe's second reign is the longest at 512 days, while Harassment (Sakura Hirota and Yumi Ohka)'s reign is the shortest which lasted less than a day.

Ayaka (Ayako Sato and Hanako Nakamori) are the current champions by defeating Chobuki (Haruka Umesaki and Unagi Sayaka at the Diana Season 3 - 1st Leg 15th Anniversary NO. 3 event which took part on July 5, 2026, in Kawasaki, Japan.

Key
No.	Overall reign number
Reign	Reign number for the specific team—reign numbers for the individuals are in parentheses, if different
Days	Number of days held
Defenses	Number of successful defenses
+	Current reign is changing daily

No.	Champion	Championship change			Reign statistics			Notes	Ref.
No.	Champion	Date	Event	Location	Reign	Days	Defenses	Notes	Ref.
1	Kaoru Ito and Tomoko Watanabe	January 28, 2013	Diana Battle of Shimokitazawa XVI	Tokyo, Japan	1	91	0	Defeated Kyoko Inoue and Sareee in a tournament final to become the inaugural champions.	
2	Keiko Aono and Yumiko Hotta	April 29, 2013	Diana 2nd Anniversary	Kawasaki, Japan	1	230	2		
3	Kyoko Inoue and Tomoko Watanabe	December 15, 2013	Diana	Tokyo, Japan	1 (1, 2)	315	4		
4	Kaoru and Mima Shimoda	October 26, 2014	Diana	Kawasaki, Japan	1	58	0		
5	Jaguar Yokota and Sareee	December 23, 2014	Diana	Kawasaki, Japan	1	201	2		
—	Vacated	July 12, 2015	Diana	Kawasaki, Japan	—	—	—	After teaming with the Voodoo Murders (Taru and Yasshi) to defeat the team of Jenny Rose, Kyoko Inoue, and Yumiko Hotta, Jaguar Yokota relinquished the championship, to which Sareee agreed.	
6	Kyoko Inoue and Yumiko Hotta	August 16, 2015	Diana	Tokyo, Japan	1 (2, 2)	30	0	Defeated Manami Toyota and Mima Shimoda to win the vacant championship.	
—	Vacated	September 15, 2015	—	—	—	—	—	The championship was vacated under unknown circumstances.	
7	Jumonji Sisters (Dash Chisako and Sendai Sachiko)	September 16, 2015	Diana	Tokyo, Japan	1	340	0	Defeated Meiko Tanaka and Sareee to win the vacant championship.	
—	Vacated	August 21, 2016	—	—	—	—	—	The championship was vacated under unknown circumstances.	
8	Crysis (Chikayo Nagashima and Megumi Yabushita)	September 19, 2016	Diana	Tokyo, Japan	1	279	1	Defeated Keiko Aono and Kyoko Inoue to win the vacant championship.	
9	Kaoru Ito and Kyoko Inoue}	June 25, 2017	Diana	Nan'yō, Japan	1 (2, 3)	166	0		
10	Takako Inoue and Yumiko Hotta	December 8, 2017	Diana	Tokyo, Japan	1 (1, 3)	226	0		
11	Crysis (Ayako Sato and Jaguar Yokota)	July 22, 2018	Diana River's Edge	Kawasaki, Japan	1 (1, 2)	258	1		
12	Kaoru Ito and Tomoko Watanabe	April 6, 2019	Diana River's Edge	Kawasaki, Japan	1 (3, 2)	512	3		
13	Luminous (Haruka Umesaki and Miyuki Takase)	August 30, 2020	Diana	Tokyo, Japan	1	154	1		
14	3A (Ayame Sasamura and Rina Shingaki)	January 31, 2021	Diana	Osaka, Japan	1	77	2		
15	Luminous (Haruka Umesaki and Miyuki Takase)	April 18, 2021	Diana 10th Anniversary	Kawasaki, Japan	2	329	1		
16	Harassment (Sakura Hirota and Yumi Ohka)	March 13, 2022	Diana	Osaka, Japan	1	<1	1	This was the final match of the 2022 Dual Shock Wave tournament.	
17	Luminous (Haruka Umesaki and Miyuki Takase)	March 13, 2022	WAVE Osaka Rhapsody Vol. 53	Osaka, Japan	3	371	3	This was a winner-takes-all match, in which Umesaki and Takase also defended their Wave Tag Team Championship.	
18	Kaho Kobayashi and Kaori Yoneyama	March 19, 2023	Diana	Osaka, Japan	1	10	0		
19	SPiCEAP (Maika Ozaki and Tae Honma)	March 29, 2023	YMZ Gokigen Spring Camp 2023	Tokyo, Japan	1	81	1		
20	Ayaka (Ayako Sato and Hanako Nakamori)	June 18, 2023	Diana Kyoko Inoue Triuphal Return	Nan'yō, Japan	1 (2, 1)	112	1		
21	Double Inoue (Kyoko Inoue and Takako Inoue)	October 8, 2023	Diana	Tokyo, Japan	1 (4, 2)	154	0		
22	Ayaka (Ayako Sato and Hanako Nakamori)	March 10, 2024	Diana	Kawasaki, Japan	2 (3, 2)	392	3		
23	Nijumaru (Nanami Hatano and Rina Amikura)	April 6, 2025	Diana	Kawasaki, Japan	1	112	1	This was a three-way tag team match also involving Captain Armstrong (Yuki Miyazaki and Yuko Sakurai).	
24	Caffeine and Crush (Ayako Sato and Debbie Keitel)	July 27, 2025	Diana	Kawasaki, Japan	1 (4, 1)	70	2		
—	Vacated	October 5, 2025	—	—	—	—	—	The championship was vacated after Caffeine and Crush defeated Unagi Sayaka and Haruka Umesaki.	
25	Chobuki (Haruka Umesaki and Unagi Sayaka)	January 24, 2026	Diana	Kawasaki, Japan	1 (4, 1)	162	1	Defeated Miran and Olympia to win the vacant titles	
26	Ayaka (Ayako Sato and Hanako Nakamori)	July 5, 2026	Diana Season 3 - 1st Leg 15th Anniversary NO. 3	Kawasaki, Japan	3 (5, 3)	121+	0		

== Combined reigns ==
As of November 3, 2026.

=== By team ===
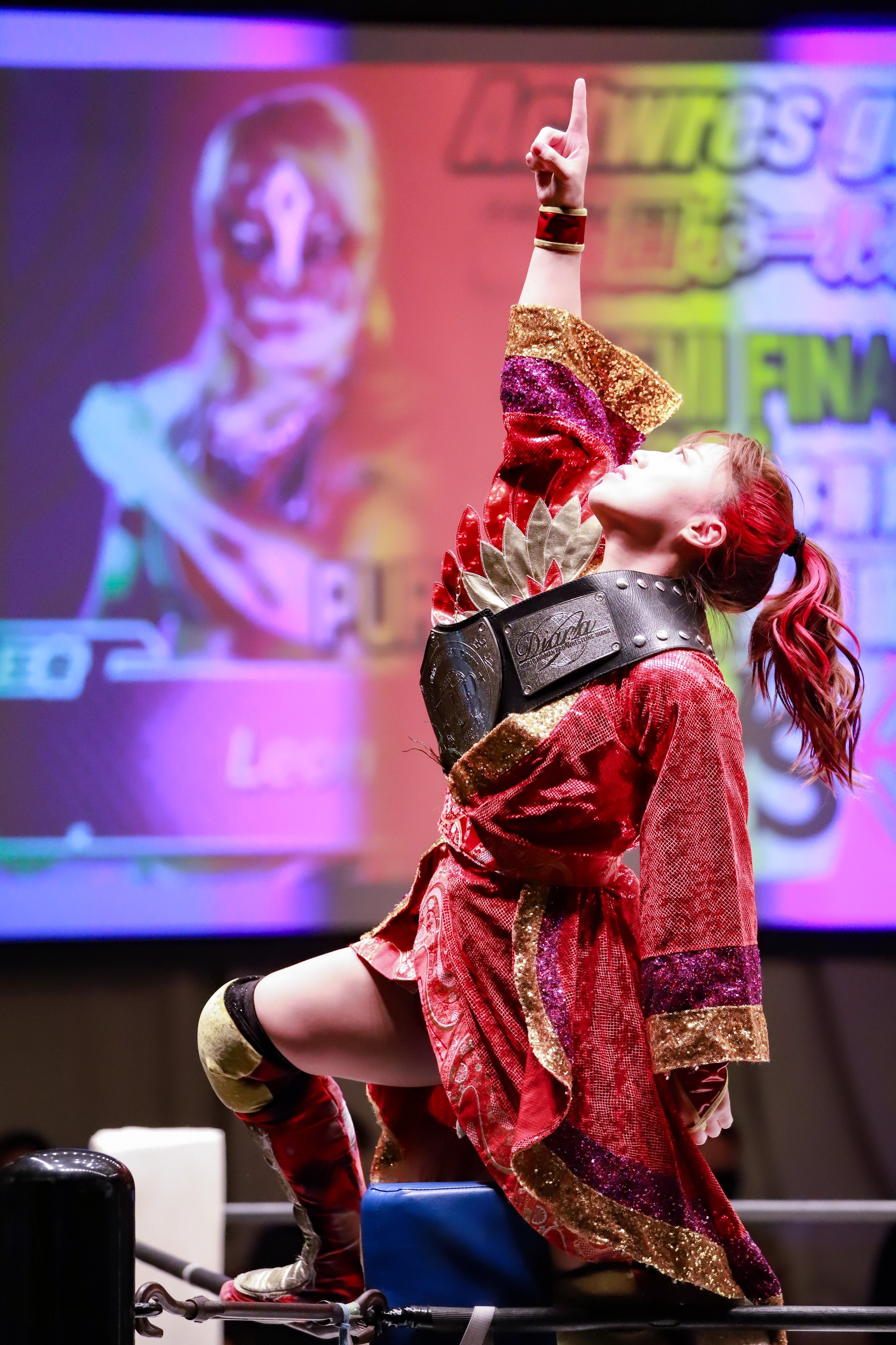
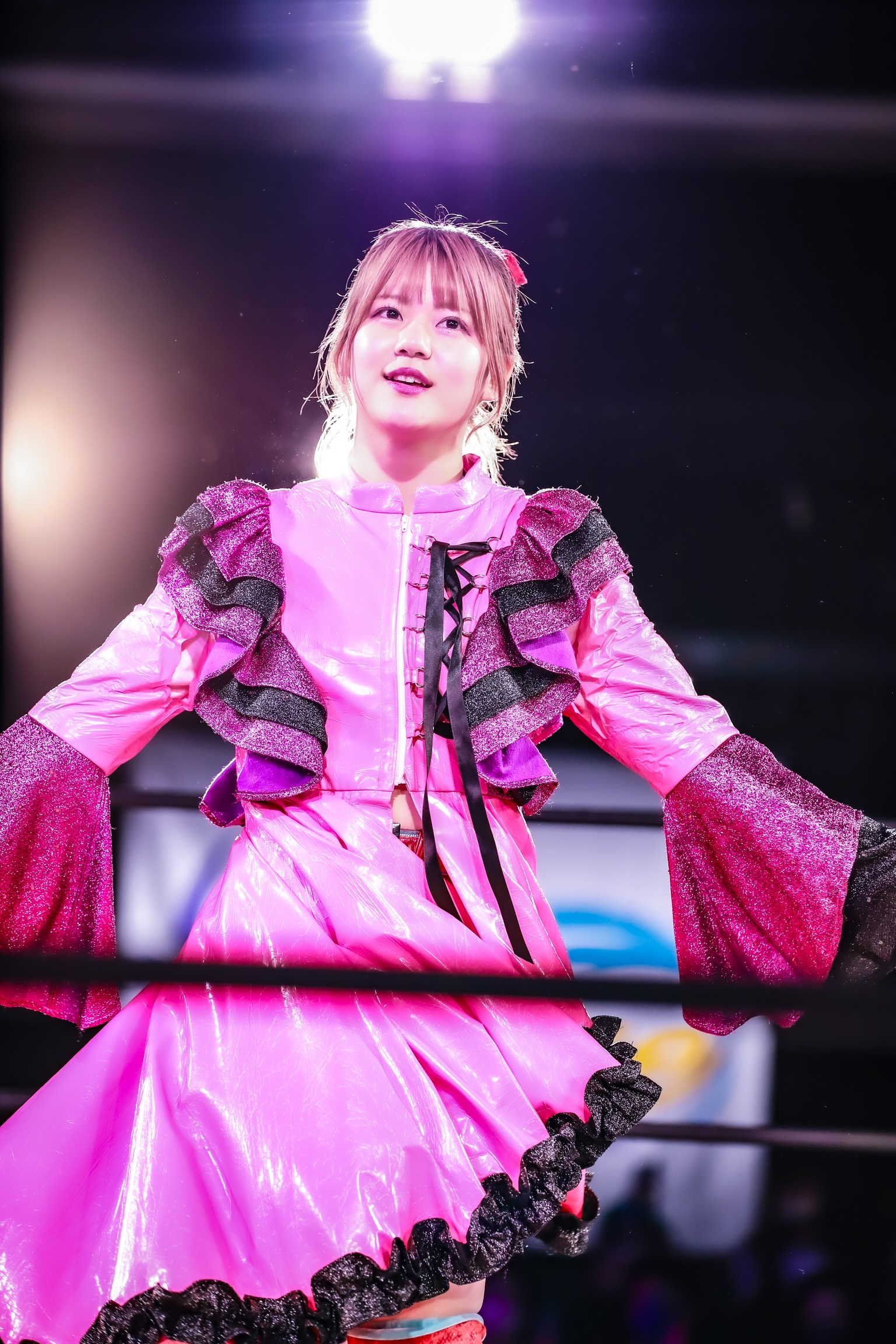
Record three-time champions as a team, Luminous (Haruka Umesaki and Miyuki Takase).

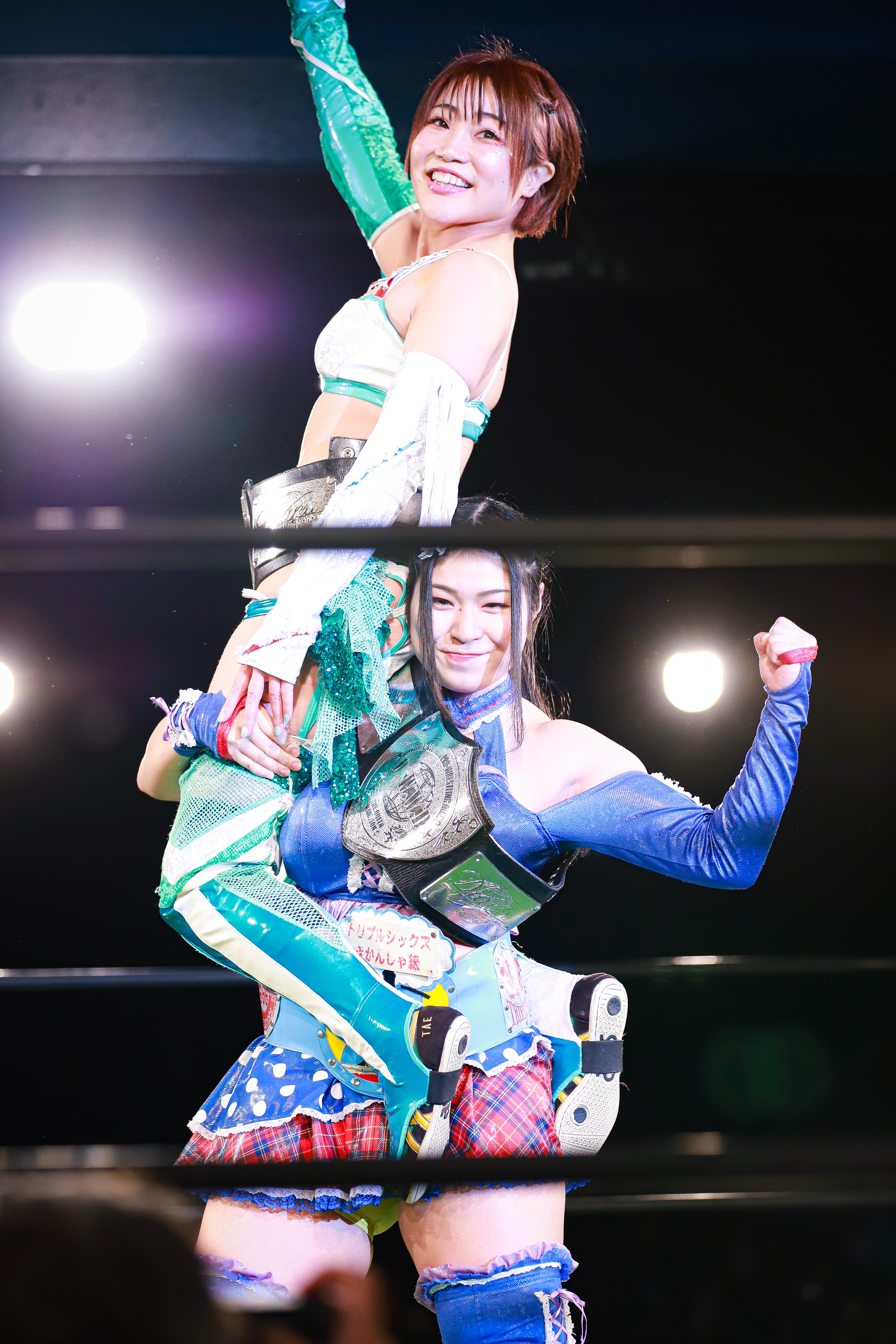
Former champions, SPiCEAP (Tae Honma and Maika Ozaki

†	Indicates the current champion

Rank	Team	No. of reigns	Combined defenses	Combined days
1	Luminous (Haruka Umesaki and Miyuki Takase)	3	5	854
2	Ayaka (Ayako Sato and Hanako Nakamori) †	3	4	625+
3	Kaoru Ito and Tomoko Watanabe	2	3	603
4	Jumonji Sisters (Dash Chisako and Sendai Sachiko)	1	0	340
5	Kyoko Inoue and Tomoko Watanabe	1	4	315
6	Crysis (Chikayo Nagashima and Megumi Yabushita)	1	1	279
7	Crysis (Ayako Sato and Jaguar Yokota)	1	1	258
8	Keiko Aono and Yumiko Hotta	1	2	230
9	Takako Inoue and Yumiko Hotta	1	0	226
10	Jaguar Yokota and Sareee	1	2	201
11	Kaoru Ito and Kyoko Inoue	1	0	166
12	Chobuki (Haruka Umesaki and Unagi Sayaka)	1	1	162
13	Double Inoue (Kyoko Inoue and Takako Inoue)	1	0	154
14	Nijumaru (Nanami Hatano and Rina Amikura)	1	1	112
15	SPiCEAP (Maika Ozaki and Tae Honma)	1	1	81
16	3A (Ayame Sasamura and Rina Shingaki)	1	2	77
17	Caffeine and Crush (Ayako Sato and Debbie Keitel)	1	2	70
18	Kaoru and Mima Shimoda	1	0	58
19	Kyoko Inoue and Yumiko Hotta	1	0	30
20	Kaho Kobayashi and Kaori Yoneyama	1	0	10
21	Harassment (Sakura Hirota and Yumi Ohka)	1	0	<1

=== By wrestler ===
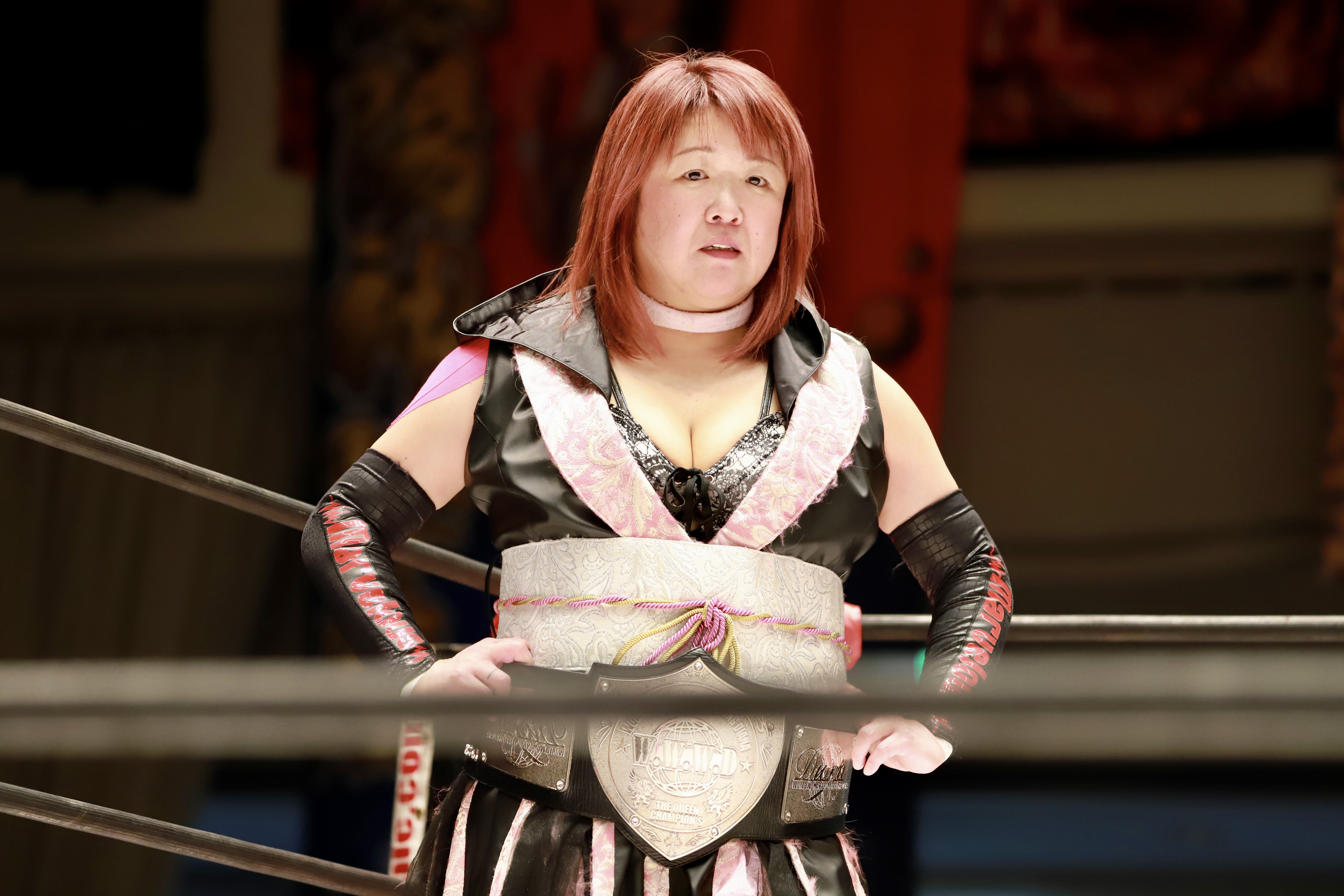
Former three-time champion as individual, Tomoko Watanabe, shown here with one of the belts.

Rank	Wrestler	No. of reigns	Combined defenses	Combined days
1	Ayako Sato †	5	7	1,064+
2	Haruka Umesaki	4	6	1,016
3	Tomoko Watanabe	3	7	918
4	Miyuki Takase	3	5	854
5	Kaoru Ito	3	3	769
6	Kyoko Inoue	4	4	665
7	Hanako Nakamori †	3	4	625+
8	Yumiko Hotta	3	2	486
9	Jaguar Yokota	2	3	459
10	Takako Inoue	2	0	380
11	Dash Chisako	1	0	340
11	Sendai Sachiko	1	0	340
13	Chikayo Nagashima	1	1	279
13	Megumi Yabushita	1	1	279
15	Keiko Aono	1	2	230
16	Sareee	1	2	201
17	Unagi Sayaka	1	1	162
18	Nanami Hatano	1	1	112
18	Rina Amikura	1	1	112
20	Maika Ozaki	1	1	81
20	Tae Honma	1	1	81
22	Ayame Sasamura	1	2	77
22	Rina Shingaki	1	2	77
24	Debbie Keitel	1	2	70
25	Kaoru	1	0	58
25	Mima Shimoda	1	0	58
27	Kaho Kobayashi	1	0	10
27	Kaori Yoneyama	1	0	10
29	Sakura Hirota	1	0	<1
29	Yumi Ohka	1	0	<1

== See also ==
- Professional wrestling in Japan
