= Kyoko Inoue =

Japanese female professional wrestler (born 1969)

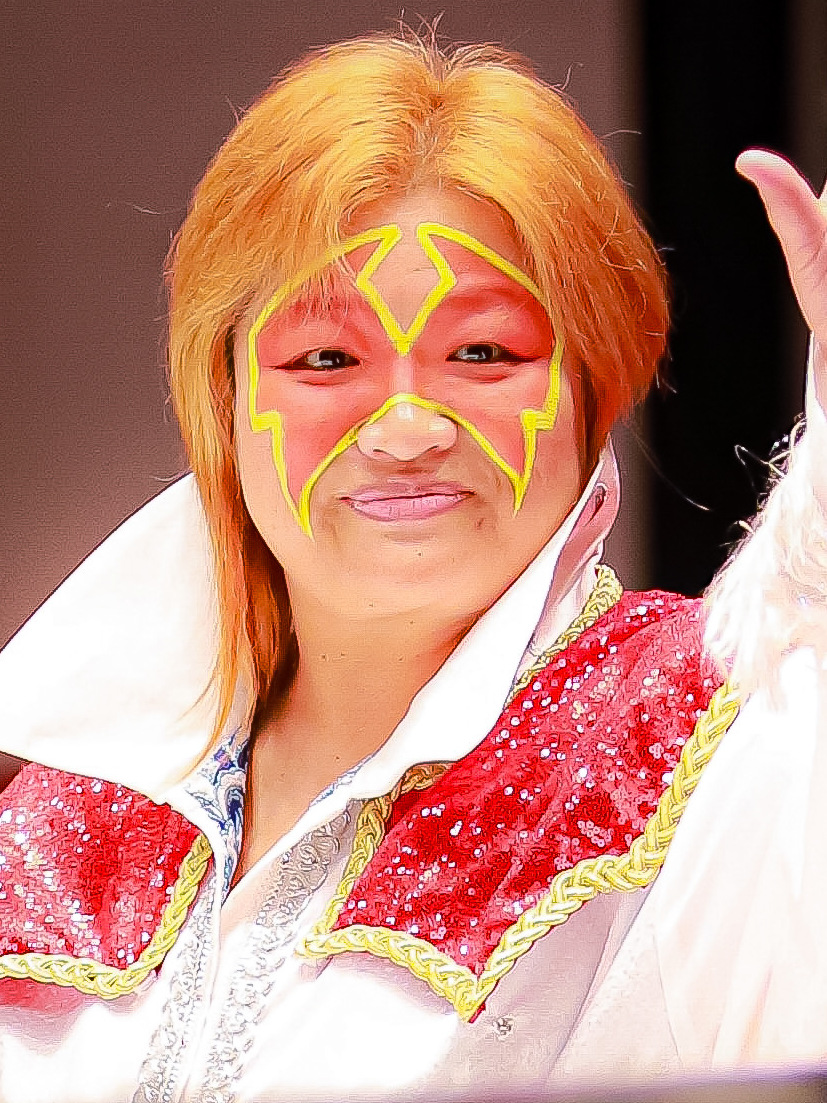
- Inoue in July 2023

Personal information
- Born: Kyoko Inoue; April 22, 1969 (age 57) Nan'yō, Yamagata, Japan

Professional wrestling career
- Ring names: Adamo Inoue; Kyoko Inoue; Madori Inoue
- Billed height: 167 cm (5 ft 6 in)
- Billed weight: 108 kg (238 lb)
- Trained by: Jaguar Yokota
- Debut: October 10, 1988

Kyoko Inoue (井上 京子, Inoue Kyōko; born April 22, 1969) is a Japanese professional wrestler currently signed to World Woman Pro-Wrestling Diana. She has held the WWWA World Single Championship three times, and is the first woman to win a men's title in Japan.

Inoue is the founder of NEO Japan Ladies Pro-Wrestling. After leaving NEO in May 2010, Inoue founded World Woman Pro-Wrestling Diana in January 2011.

== Professional wrestling career ==
=== Early career (1988–1994) ===
Inoue was trained by famous Japanese wrestler, Jaguar Yokota. Inoue made her debut on October 11, 1988. From 1991 to 1992 she worked for CMLL in Mexico.

=== World Wrestling Federation (1994; 1995) ===
On May 11, 1994, Inoue made her first appearance on World Wrestling Federation (WWF) during a live event in Japan, where she unsuccessfully challenged Alundra Blayze for the WWF Women's Championship.

On November 19, 1995, at Survivor Series, Inoue joined the team of Blayze in the traditional Survivor Series elimination match. Blayze's team lost, as Aja Kong remained the sole survivor of the opposing team. On the November 27th episode of Monday Night Raw, Inoue alongside Blayze lost to Kong and Tomoko Watanabe.

=== Late career (1995–present) ===
On March 26, 1995, as part of AJW's Wrestling Queendom Victory event, Inoue challenged Bull Nakano for her WWF Women's Championship - who had held it since Big Egg Wrestling Universe in November 1994. Nakano retained at the 17:05 mark ahead of her anticipated title match with Alundra Blayze at Wrestlemania XI (it would instead happen on the April 3rd edition of Raw).

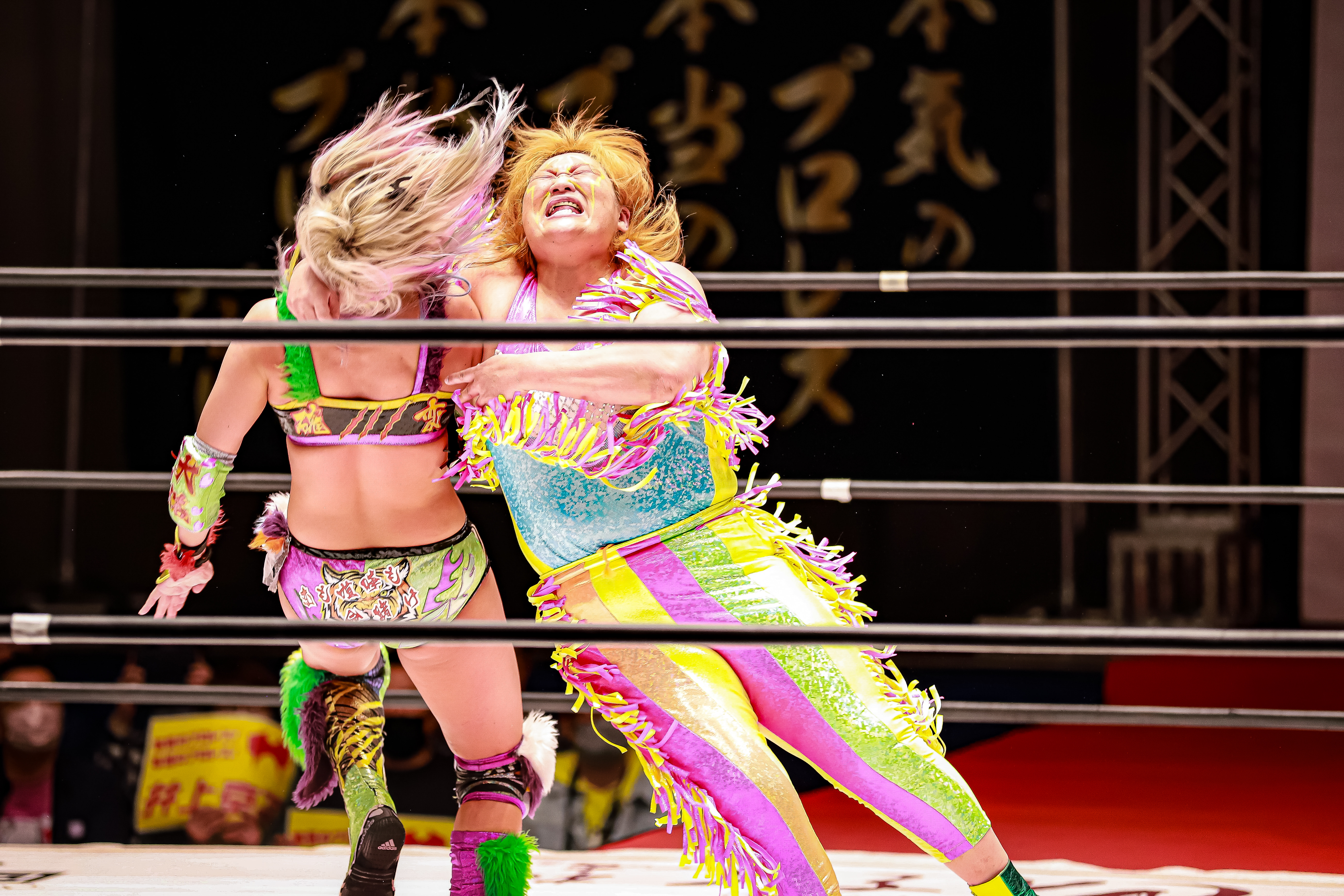
Inoue facing Unagi Sayaka at a Diana event in April 2023

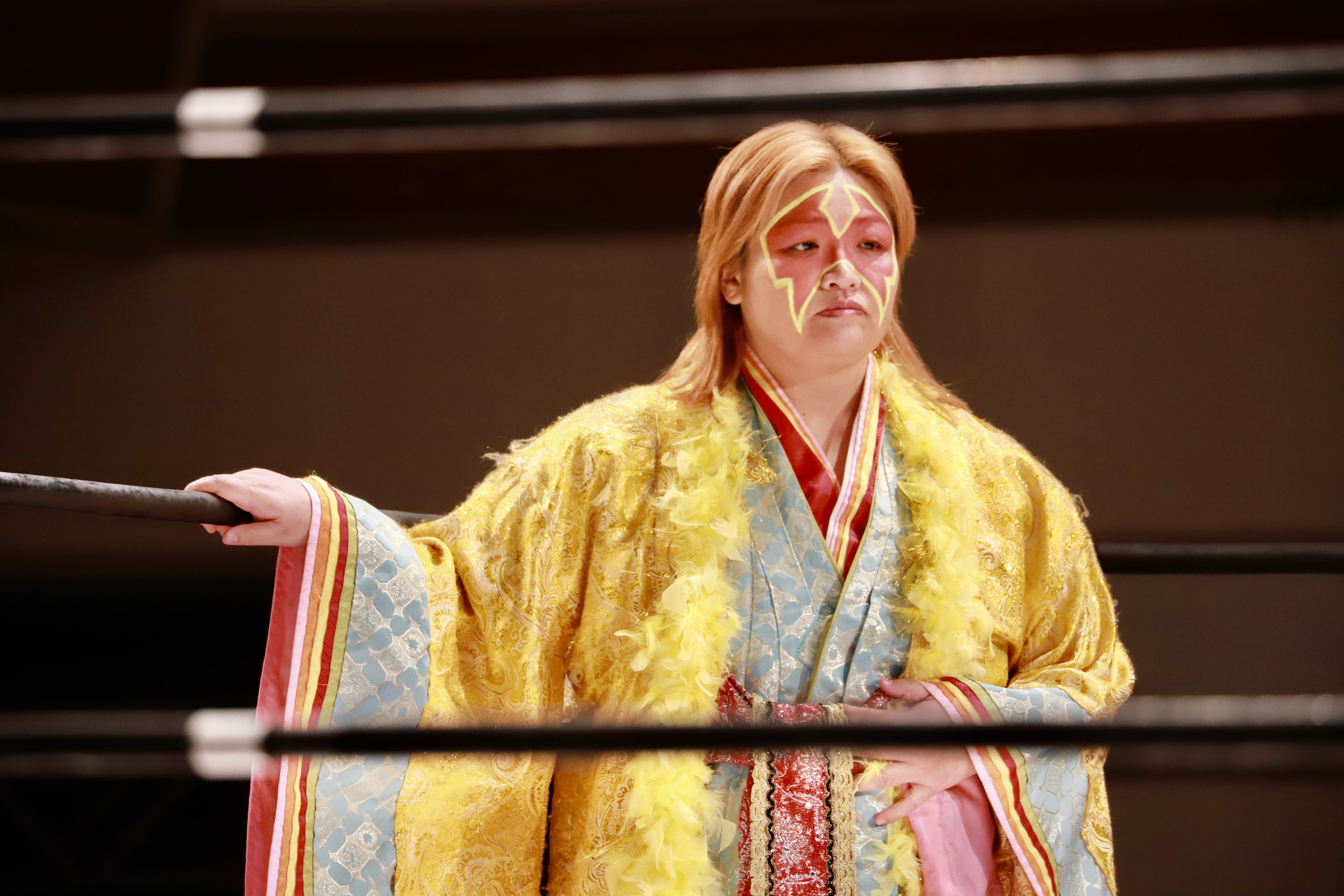
Inoue in January 2020

Following her WWF appearances, Inoue continued to compete at the highest level in Japanese women's wrestling. In 1995, she engaged in a notable rivalry with Bull Nakano, challenging for the WWF Women's Championship and later defeating Nakano in a singles match at Nippon Budokan. Her 60-minute draw with Manami Toyota for the WWWA World Single Championship on May 7, 1995, was named "Match of the Year" by the Wrestling Observer Newsletter.

In 1996, Inoue captured the WWWA World Singles Championship from Toyota at Ryogoku Kokugikan. The following year, she achieved the historic feat of becoming the first women's triple crown champion by simultaneously holding the WWWA World Singles Championship, All Pacific Championship, and IWA World Women's Championship. After leaving All Japan Women's Pro-Wrestling in 1997, she joined Neo Ladies in 1998.

Inoue became a central figure in NEO Japan Ladies Pro-Wrestling, serving as the organization's symbol and competing in main events. She took a hiatus in 2007 due to health issues and gave birth to a son in November of that year. Following her 2008 comeback, she continued competing until NEO's dissolution was announced in 2010.

In January 2011, Inoue founded World Woman Pro-Wrestling Diana, initially serving as president before transitioning to the role of organization representative. She has remained active with Diana, winning multiple championships including becoming the inaugural WWWD World Champion in 2013. Despite ongoing health challenges, including cervical issues that have periodically sidelined her, Inoue continues to compete and remains a prominent figure in Japanese women's professional wrestling.

== Affiliation ==
- All Japan Women's Pro-Wrestling (1988–1997)
- Freelance (1997)
- Neo Ladies (1997–2000)
- ECW JAPAN (2000)
- NEO Japan Ladies Pro-Wrestling (2000-2010)
- Freelance (2010)
- World Woman Pro Wrestling Diana (2011–present)

== Championships and accomplishments ==
- All Japan Women's Pro-Wrestling

- AJW Championship (1 time)
- All Pacific Championship (3 times)
- IWA World Women's Championship (2 times)
- WWWA World Single Championship (3 times)
- WWWA World Tag Team Championship (4 times) – with Takako Inoue
- Japan Grand Prix (1991)
- Tag League the Best (1991) – with Toshiyo Yamada
- Tag League the Best (1992) – with Aja Kong
- Tag League the Best (1995) – with Tomoko Watanabe

- Dramatic Dream Team

- Ironman Heavymetalweight Championship (2 times)

- JDStar

- TWF World Women's Championship (2 times)

- NEO Japan Ladies Pro-Wrestling

- NEO Tag Team Championship (1 time) - with Hiroyo Matsumoto
- NWA Women's Pacific/NEO Single Championship (3 times)
- NEO Mid-Summer Tag Tournament 7 (2008) - with Hiroyo Matsumoto

- Tokyo Sports

- Joshi Puroresu Grand Prize (1996)

- World Entertainment Wrestling

- WEW 6-Man Tag Team Championship (2 times) – with Kodo Fuyuki and Chocoball Mukai
- WEW Tag Team Championship (1 time) – with Hiromichi Fuyuki

- World Woman Pro-Wrestling Diana

- WWWD Queen Elizabeth Championship (3 times)
- WWWD Tag Team Championship (4 times) – with Tomoko Watanabe (1), Yumiko Hotta (1), Kaoru Ito (1) and Takako Inoue (1)
- WWWD World Championship (4 times, inaugural)
- First Triple Crown Champion
- Queen Championship Tournament (2013)

- Wrestling Observer Newsletter

- Match of the Year (1995) vs. Manami Toyota on May 7

== Luchas de Apuestas record ==
Winner (wager)	Loser (wager)	Location	Event	Date	Notes
Bull Nakano & Kyoko Inoue (hair)	Aja Kong & Bison Kimura (hair)	Kawasaki, Kanagawa, Japan	AJW event	November 1, 1991	
