= Aoi Kizuki =

Japanese professional wrestler

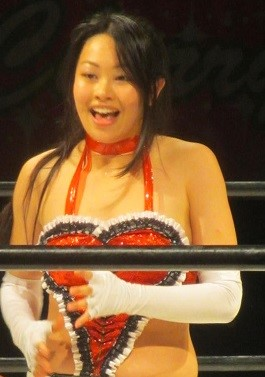
- Kizuki in April 2016

Personal information
- Born: March 26, 1989 (age 37) Tokyo, Japan

Professional wrestling career
- Ring name: Aoi Kizuki
- Billed height: 1.62 m (5 ft 4 in)
- Billed weight: 53 kg (117 lb)
- Trained by: Emi Sakura
- Debut: May 1, 2005
- Retired: October 7, 2018

Aoi Kizuki (希月あおい, Kizuki Aoi) is a Japanese retired professional wrestler best known for her tenure with various Japanese promotions such as Ice Ribbon, JWP Joshi Puroresu and Oz Academy. Appointed by Emi Sakura in May 2025, she is the current on-screen general manager of ChocoPro.

== Professional wrestling career ==
=== Independent circuit (2005–2018) ===
Kizuki made her professional wrestling debut at The Love, Courage And Guts I Want To Convey 3, an event promoted by the Gatokunyan promotion on May 1, 2005, where she participated in a gauntlet match also involving Emi Sakura, Mai Ichii, Miki Ishii, Moeka Haruhi, Ray and Rika Takahashi to battle Chika Natsumi in a time-limit draw.

As a freelancer, Kizuki is known for competing in multiple promotions of the Japanese independent scene. At NEO Be Happy Again ~ 10th Anniversary, an event promoted by NEO Japan Ladies Pro-Wrestling on January 6, 2008, she participated in a 30-person battle royal won by Mima Shimoda and also involving Etsuko Mita, Munenori Sawa, Nagisa Nozaki, Ran Yu-Yu, Tomoka Nakagawa, Toshie Uematsu, Tsubasa Kuragaki and others. At ZERO1/Super Fireworks Current Blast Festival 2018 In Kawasaki, an event promoted by Pro Wrestling Zero1 on August 5, 2018, she picked up a victory against Sae. At SEAdLINNNG d-Higher 2018, an event promoted by Seadlinnng on October 3, 2018, she teamed up with Makoto and Tsukasa Fujimoto to defeat Ayame Sasamura, Mio Momono and Miyuki Takase.

==== American independent scene (2017) ====
Kizuki wrestled in a few matches for Shimmer Women Athletes. The first two matches took place at Vol. 97 on November 11, 2017, where she firstly fell short to Mia Yim and then defeated Veda Scott. At Vol. 98 on November 12, she also worked in two matches, one of them in which she defeated Chelsea Green and another one in which she teamed up with Hiroyo Matsumoto in a losing effort to Fire And Nice (Britt Baker and Chelsea Green).

=== Ice Ribbon (2006–2018) ===
The promotion in which Kizuki made her most significant work was Ice Ribbon where she is a former ICE Cross Infinity Champion and three-time International Ribbon Tag Team Champion. She made her first appearance at Ice Ribbon Raising An Army Part 2 on June 20, 2006, where she teamed up with Ray in a losing effort to Nanae Takahashi and Yuna. At Ice Ribbon The NEO 3x3, a cross-over event held by Ice Ribbon in partnership with Big Japan Pro Wrestling and NEO on February 10, 2008, Kizuki teamed up with Riho to defeat Emi Sakura and Seina. At New Ice Ribbon #619 on January 4, 2015, she unsuccessfully challenged Neko Nitta and Mio Shirai in a three-way match for the Triangle Ribbon Championship. She is known for competing in battle royal matches, such as the one from New Ice Ribbon #376 from March 25, 2012, where she faced the likes of Shigehiro Irie, Hikaru Shida, Jun Kasai and many others. Another notable battle royal in which she took place was the one from Ice Ribbon New Year Ribbon on January 4, 2012, also involving Tsukasa Fujimoto, Hamuko Hoshi, Hikari Minami, Maki Narumiya, Makoto Oishi, Miyako Matsumoto, Masahiro Takanashi, Yasu Urano and others. She made her last appearance at New Ice Ribbon #911 on September 29, 2018, where she competed in a 13-person gauntlet match in which she faced the likes of Giulia, Mochi Miyagi, Tequila Saya, Totoro Satsuki and others in a time-limit draw.

=== JWP Joshi Puroresu (2006–2017) ===
Another promotion with which Kizuki had a long time tenure was JWP Joshi Puroresu. She won the 2015 edition of the Tag League The Best by teaming up with Kayoko Haruyama, leading the Block A with a total of six points after they went against Voladoras L×R (Leon and Ray), Violence Princess (Arisa Nakajima and Hanako Nakamori) and Yako Fujigasaki and Yua Hayashi, and against Command Bolshoi and Kyoko Kimura in the finals. At a house show from February 5, 2017, she teamed up with Kagetsu to unsuccessfully challenge Command Bolshoi and Leon for both JWP Tag Team Championship and Daily Sports Women's Tag Team Championship. She made her last appearance at JWP Fly High In The 25th Anniversary Party ~ The Thanksgiving on April 2, 2017, where she competed in a 17-woman battle royal also involving Dash Chisako, Hana Kimura, Jaguar Yokota, Kaoru, Natsumi Maki, Sachie Abe and others.

=== Oz Academy (2015–2018) ===
Kizuki was also part of Oz Academy's roster. She wrestled her first match on August 23, 2015, at Plum Hanasaku ~ Country Of OZ 2015: Yokohama Dreams Park #3 where she fell short to Dynamite Kansai. At OZ Academy Top Artist on March 19, 2017, Kizuki teamed up with Manami Toyota and unsuccessfully challenged Aja Kong and Yoshiko for the #1 condentership for the Oz Academy Tag Team Championship. At OZ Academy Summer Soft Breeze on July 16, 2017, she teamed up with Hiroe Nagahama and Rina Yamashita in a losing effort to Ozaki-gun (Alex Lee, Mayumi Ozaki and Yumi Ohka). At OZ Academy No End Taboo on December 3, 2017, Kizuki teamed up with Kaori Yoneyama, Koharu Hinata and Yumiko Hotta in a losing effort against MISSION K4 (Mika Akino, Kaho Kobayashi, Kakeru Sekiguchi and Sonoko Kato).

=== Pro Wrestling Wave (2016–2018) ===
Kizuki is also known for competing in Pro Wrestling Wave. At WAVE Hakata WAVE ~Bari-Chiro 4~ on April 17, 2016, she teamed up with Moeka Haruhi to unsuccessfully challenge Ayako Hamada and Yuu Yamagata for the Wave Tag Team Championship. She competed in the 2016 edition of the Catch the Wave tournament, placing herself in the "Chrome Yellow Block", scoring a total of two points after going against Ryo Mizunami, Chikayo Nagashima and Meiko Tanaka. At WAVE Weekday WAVE Vol. 110, an event promoted on August 30, 2017, she teamed up with Moeka Haruhi to defeat Avid Rival (Misaki Ohata and Ryo Mizunami).

=== Pure-J (2017–2018) ===
A promotion in which Kizuki briefly activated was Pure-J. At PURE-J Pure-Dream on April 15, 2018, she unsuccessfully faced Hanako Nakamori for the Pure-J Openweight Championship after defeating Manami Katsu two months before to become the number one contender. At PURE-J Chase The Chance Vol. 4, an event promoted on September 30, 2018, she teamed up with Nakamori in a losing effort to Command Bolshoi and Yako Fujigasaki. This marked her last match in the promotion.

Kizuki had her last match of career at Aoi Kizuki Retirement Produce Final Happy, an independent show from October 7, 2018, where she teamed up with Mei Suruga and Riho in a losing effort against Emi Sakura, Hikaru Shida and Makoto as a result of a six-woman tag team match.

== Personal life ==
On October 7, 2019, Hikaru Shida posted a tweet in which she showed that Kizuki got married.

== Championships and accomplishments ==
- DDT Pro-Wrestling
  - Fly To Everywhere World Championship (1 time)
- Ice Ribbon
  - ICE Cross Infinity Championship (1 time)
  - International Ribbon Tag Team Championship (3 times) – with Kayoko Haruyama (1), Sayaka Obihiro (1) and Tsukushi Haruka (1)
- JWP Joshi Puroresu
  - Tag League the Best (2015) – with Kayoko Haruyama
- Gatoh Move Pro Wrestling
  - Asia Dream Tag Team Championship (1 time) – with Sayaka Obihiro
- Reina
  - Reina World Tag Team Championship (1 time) – with Tsukushi Haruka
