= Sachie Abe =

Japanese professional wrestler (born 1974)

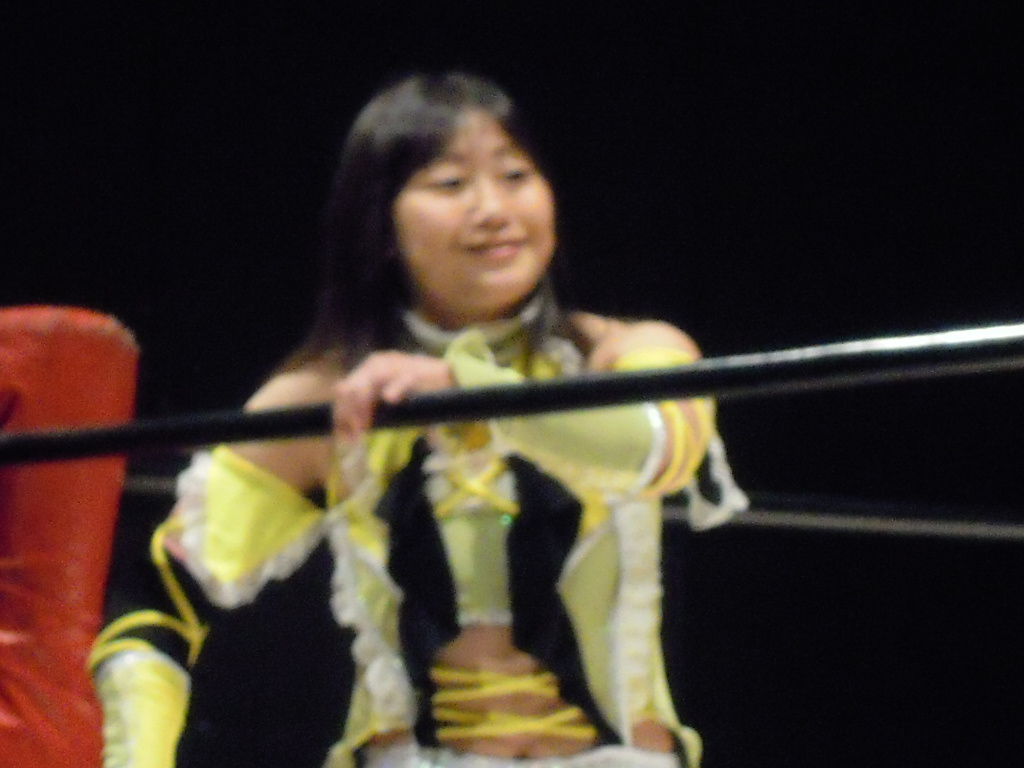
- Abe in May 2011

Personal information
- Born: September 18, 1974 (age 51) Setagaya, Japan

Professional wrestling career
- Ring name(s): High School Girl; Nise Kazuki; Nise Yokota; Sachie Abe; Santa Abe; Yukie Abe
- Billed height: 153 cm (5 ft 0 in)
- Billed weight: 53 kg (117 lb)
- Trained by: Jaguar Yokota
- Debut: 1996
- Retired: 2014

Yukie Abe (阿部ゆきえ, Abe Yukie), better known by her ring name Sachie Abe, is a Japanese retired professional wrestler best known for her tenure with the Japanese promotions JWP Joshi Puroresu and JDStar.

== Professional wrestling career ==
=== Independent circuit (1996-2014) ===
As a freelancer, Abe is known for competing in multiple promotions of the Japanese independent scene. On the seventh night of Major Girl's Fighting AtoZ's Flag Raising Series tournament from August 24, 2003, Abe unsuccessfully competed in an 8-woman tag team elimination match for the Queen of Arsion Championship where she teamed up with the champion Mima Shimoda, Mirai and Yumiko Hotta in a losing effort against Mariko Yoshida, Akino, Rie Tamada and Ai Fujita. At New Ice Ribbon #129 , an event promoted by Ice Ribbon on November 3, 2009, she unsuccessfully challenged Emi Sakura for the ICE Cross Infinity Championship. Abe also competed in independently produced shows such as Jaguar Yokota's 30th Anniversary on March 11, 2007, where she fought in a 32-woman battle royal won by Devil Masami and also involving notable opponents such as Carlos Amano, Chikayo Nagashima, Kaoru Ito, Ran Yu-Yu, Mayumi Ozaki and many others.

Abe often competed in men's promotions as a joshi talent. On the eighth night of New Japan Pro Wrestling's Best of the Super Juniors from May 28, 2002, Abe unsuccessfully challenged The Bloody. While still competing in JWP, she participated in a joint show produced in partnership with Big Japan Pro Wrestling on September 27, 2012, where she teamed up with Takashi Sasaki and Jaki Numazawa to defeat Hideyoshi Kamitani, Kayoko Haruyama and Yuji Okabayashi in a six-man tag team match. At W-1 WRESTLE-1 Tour 2013, an event promoted by Wrestle-1 on November 16, 2013, Abe fell short to Hanako Nakamori.

=== JD Star (1996-2007) ===
Abe is best known for her decade-long tenure with JDStar. She made her professional wrestling debut at a house show from May 2, 1996, where she fell short to Nana Fujimura. At JD Star Joan Of Arc Grapple Beauty Final, the final show before the promotion's closure from July 16, 2007, Abe competed in a 24-woman rumble match won by Shuu Shibutani and also involving Cherry, Kyoko Kimura, Misaki Ohata, Yumi Ohka and others.

=== JWP Joshi Puroresu (2000-2014) ===
Another promotion where Abe is known to have competed in is JWP Joshi Puroresu. She participated in several of the promotion's signature events such as Tag League the Best, making her first appearance at the 2011 edition of the tournament where she teamed up with Kazuki as "The☆Wanted!?", placing themselves in the "Blue Zone" and scoring a total of four points after going against the teams of Shishi no Ana (Leon and Misaki Ohata), Rainbow Dragon (Aoi Yagami and Command Bolshoi) and Cutie Pair (masu-me and Tsukasa Fujimoto). She made her last appearance at the 2014 edition where she teamed up with Yako Fujigasaki, placing themselves in the Block B and scoring no points after going against the teams of Hanako Nakamori and Takako Inoue, Mascara Voladoras (Leon and Ray), and Spring☆Victory (Kayoko Haruyama and Manami Katsu).

Another signature event in which Abe competed is the Natsu Onna Kettei Tournament, making her first appearance at the 2009 edition where she fell short to Yumi Ohka in the first rounds. She scored her best result at the 2010 edition where she teamed up with Aja Kong to defeat Kazuki and Toshie Uematsu in the first rounds and then fell short to Kagetsu and Leon in the semi-finals.

At JWP Pure Violence Road .1 on February 10, 2013, Abe unsuccessfully challenged Leon for the CMLL-Reina International Championship. At a house show promoted on February 14, 2013, Abe fell short to Kayoko Haruyama in the semi-finals of a tournament to determine the number one contender for the JWP Openweight Championship. Abe wrestled her retirement match on August 17, 2014, at JWP Pure Plum 2014 where she teamed up with her long time tag team partner Kazuki in a losing effort to her coach Jaguar Yokoya and Megumi Yabushita.

=== Pro Wrestling Wave (2009-2014) ===
Another promotion in which Abe made sporadic appearances was Pro Wrestling Wave. On December 30, 2013, at Gami's retirement show, she participated in a 77-person royal rumble match won by the latter and also involving notable opponents such as Yuji Okabayashi, Yuko Miyamoto, Sanshiro Takagi, Minoru Suzuki, Isami Kodaka, Taka Michinoku and many others.

=== Brief return to professional wrestling (2016-2017) ===
Abe came out of retirement for several more matches. The first of them was the JD Star 20th Anniversary Reunion Show from April 3, 2016, where she won a 13-person battle royal also involving Fuka and various wrestlers retired long ago such as Emi Tomimatsu, Fang Suzuki, Obacchi Iizuka and others. She also competed at the JWP Fly High In The 25th Anniversary Party, the last ever event produced by JWP Joshi Puroresu before its closure on April 2, 2017, where she first appeared into a 17-person battle royal won by Kaori Yoneyama and also involving Aoi Kizuki, Azumi Hyuga, Kaoru, Hana Kimura, Natsumi Maki, Yako Fujigasaki, Yuki Miyazaki and others, and then wrestled for the second time in a row as part of a six-man tag team match where she teamed up with Kayoko Haruyama and Kaori Yoneyama, going into a time-limit draw against Azumi Hyuga, Hikari Fukuoka and Yuki Miyazaki. Abe has been inactive ever since.

== Championships and accomplishments ==
- JDStar
  - TWF World Women's Tag Team Championship (4 times) – with Fang Suzuki (1) and Kazuki (3)
  - TWF World Women's Tag Team Championship Tournament (2002) – with Kazuki
  - Two Day Tournament (2002)
- JWP Joshi Puroresu
  - JWP Tag Team Championship (3 times) – with Aja Kong (1) and Kazuki (2)
- Pure-J
  - Daily Sports Women's Tag Team Championship (1 time) – with Aja Kong
