= Kazuki (wrestler) =

Japanese professional wrestler

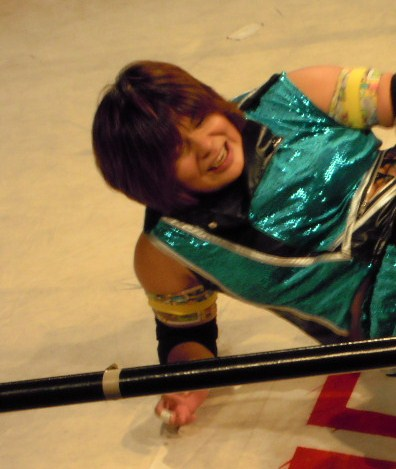
- Kazuki in August 2010

Personal information
- Born: December 25, 1975 (age 50) Wake, Japan

Professional wrestling career
- Ring name(s): Mini Skirt Police; Kazuko Fujiwara; Kazuki Haruyama; Judoka; Kazuki
- Billed height: 155 cm (5 ft 1 in)
- Billed weight: 67 kg (148 lb)
- Debut: 1997

Kazuko Fujiwara (藤原和子, Fujiwara Kazuko) mononymously known by her ring name Kazuki (sometimes stylized in capital letters as KAZUKI) is a Japanese professional wrestler currently working as a freelancer and is best known for her tenure with various Japanese promotions such as Pure-J, JWP Joshi Puroresu and JDStar.

== Professional wrestling career ==
=== Independent circuit (1997–present) ===
As a freelancer, Fujiwara is known for competing in multiple promotions of the Japanese independent scene. She often competed in men's promotion as joshi talent. At BJW Presents Jaguar Yokota Road To 40th Anniversary In Hamamatsu, an event promoted by Big Japan Pro Wrestling on October 1, 2016, she teamed up with Dynamite Kansai and Manami Toyota in a losing effort against Jaguar Yokota, Mayumi Ozaki and Megumi Yabushita. At World Woman Pro-Wrestling Diana 6th Anniversary Show on April 9, 2017, Fujiwara teamed up with her "Crysis" tag team partner Chikayo Nagashima in a losing effort against Mariko Yoshida and Mima Shimoda.

=== JDStar (1997–2018) ===
Fujiwara made her professional wrestling debut at a house show promoted by JDStar on July 9, 1997, where she teamed up with Alda Moreno to defeat Neftaly and Obacchi Iizuka.

=== JWP Joshi Puroresu (1998–2017) ===
A promotion in which Fujiwara worked for almost two decades in JWP Joshi Puroresu. She is known for competing in the promotion's signature events such as Tag League the Best, making her first appearance at the 2011 edition of the event where she teamed up with her "The☆Wanted!?" tag team partner Sachie Abe, placing themselves in the Blue Zone and scoring a total of four points after going against Shishi no Ana (Leon and Misaki Ohata), Rainbow Dragon (Aoi Yagami and Command Bolshoi) and Cutie Pair (masu-me and Tsukasa Fujimoto). Kazuki and Abe moved forward to the finals of the tournament where they fell short to Harukura (Kayoko Haruyama and Tsubasa Kuragaki). Fujiwara made her last appearance at the 2016 edition where she teamed up with Rydeen Hagane as Wanted '14 and defeated Meiko Tanaka and Sareee in the first round, Syuri and Konami in the semi-finals but fell short to Hanako Nakamori and Makoto in the finals.

Another signature event in which Fujiwara competed was the Natsu Onna Kettei Tournament, making her first appearance at the 2009 edition where she fell short to Kaori Yoneyama in the first rounds. She scored her last appearance at the 2012 edition which would be the very last of the event where she fell short to Miyako Matsumoto in the first rounds.

JWP once hosted an event in partnership with Ice Ribbon, the Ice Ribbon New Ice Ribbon #406 ~ JRIBBON from July 28, 2012, where Fujiwara competed in a battle royal won by Leon and also involving Hamuko Hoshi, Kayoko Haruyama, Neko Nitta and others. At JWP/Sendai Girls JWP Vs. Sendai Girls, a show held in partnership with Sendai Girls' Pro Wrestling on March 26, 2017, Fujiwara defeated Rydeen Hagane.

=== Pro Wrestling Wave (2008–2020) ===
A promotion in which Fujiwara made sporadic appearances is Pro Wrestling Wave. At Wave's 5th Anniversary on August 26, 2012, she competed in a 29-person battle royal won by Misaki Ohata and also involving Aja Kong, Gami, Tomoka Nakagawa, Hikaru Shida, Kana, Kyoko Kimura, Cherry, Mio Shirai and many others. At WAVE Nagoya WAVE ~ Kin Shachi Special Edition, an event promoted on March 20, 2020, she unsuccessfully competed in a three-way match for the World Woman Pro-Wrestling Diana Queen Elizabeth title against the champion Sakura Hirota and Yumi Ohka.

== Championships and accomplishments ==
- JDStar
  - TWF World Women's Tag Team Championship (3 times) – with Sachie Abe
- JWP Joshi Puroresu
  - JWP Tag Team Championship (3 times) – with Sachie Abe (2) and Toshie Uematsu (1)
  - Natsume Determination Tournament (2008)
- Pure-J
  - Daily Sports Women's Tag Team Championship (4 times) – with Rydeen Hagane (1), Toshie Uematsu (1), Cherry (1) and Kaori Yoneyama (1)
