= Natsu Onna Kettei Tournament =

Japanese professional wrestling tournament

The Natsu Onna Kettei Tournament (夏女決定トーナメント, Natsu Onna Kettei Tōnamento) was an annual professional wrestling tournament promoted by the JWP Joshi Puroresu promotion between 2009 and 2012. The name of the tournament was Japanese for "Summer Woman Determination Tournament" and as the name suggests, it was held during the summer. The tournament was contested in a single-elimination format, however, uniquely, every other tournament was for singles wrestlers and every other for tag teams of two wrestlers. Throughout the years, the tournament featured several outside participants, most notably from the Ice Ribbon promotion, with which JWP co-produced the 2012 "JRibbon" tournament. Kaori Yoneyama is the only wrestler to have won the tournament twice; once as a singles wrestler and once teaming with Command Bolshoi.

== List of winners ==
Year	Winner	Ref.
2009	Kaori Yoneyama	
2010	Command Bolshoi and Kaori Yoneyama	
2011	Tsubasa Kuragaki	
2012	Hanako Nakamori and Maki Narumiya	

== 2009 ==
The first ever Natsu Onna Kettei Tournament took place during two shows on August 2, 2009. The tournament featured fourteen singles wrestlers, including six outside participants; Ayako Sato from Ito Dojo, freelancers Chihiro Oikawa, Megumi Yabushita and Toshie Uematsu, Makoto from Ice Ribbon and Yumi Ohka from Pro Wrestling Wave. Oikawa and Makoto were granted automatic spots in the second round of the tournament. The eventual tournament winner, Kaori Yoneyama, went on to unsuccessfully challenge Kayoko Haruyama for the JWP Openweight Championship on October 4.

First Round
Kaori Yoneyama	Pin
Kazuki	06:09
Command Bolshoi	Pin
Tsubasa Kuragaki	14:50
Megumi Yabushita	Pin
Toujyuki Leon	10:37
Ayako Sato	Pin
Azumi Hyuga	08:52
Keito	Pin
Toshie Uematsu	06:03
Sachie Abe	Sub
Yumi Ohka	06:31

Second round
Makoto	Pin
Kaori Yoneyama	06:48
Tsubasa Kuragaki	Pin
Toujyuki Leon	01:12 (Note: The match originally ended in a fifteen-minute time limit draw, but was restarted immediately afterwards in order to determine a winner.)
Azumi Hyuga	Pin
Toshie Uematsu	06:11
Yumi Ohka	Pin
Chihiro Oikawa	08:11

Semifinals
Kaori Yoneyama	Pin
Tsubasa Kuragaki	00:40
Yumi Ohka	Pin
Toshie Uematsu	04:22

Final
Kaori Yoneyama	Pin
Yumi Ohka	09:55

== 2010 ==
The second and first tag team Natsu Onna Kettei Tournament took place over three shows between July 24 and August 15, 2010. The tournament featured sixteen wrestlers comprising eight teams, including eight outside participants; Aja Kong and Dynamite Kansai from Oz Academy, freelancers Asami Kawasaki and Toshie Uematsu, Ayako Sato and Hanako Kobayashi from Ito Dojo, Kagetsu from Sendai Girls' Pro Wrestling and Tanny Mouse from NEO Japan Ladies Pro Wrestling.

First round
Aja Kong; Sachie Abe	Pin
Kazuki; Toshie Uematsu	09:53
Asami Kawasaki; Keito	Pin
Kagetsu; Leon	14:59
Ayako Sato; Hanako Kobayashi	Pin
Dynamite Kansai; Tsubasa Kuragaki	13:17
Command Bolshoi; Kaori Yoneyama	Pin
Kayoko Haruyama; Tanny Mouse	12:50

Semifinals
Aja Kong; Sachie Abe	Pin
Kagetsu; Leon	13:10
Dynamite Kansai; Tsubasa Kuragaki	Pin
Command Bolshoi; Kaori Yoneyama	12:13

Finals
Kagetsu; Leon	Pin
Command Bolshoi; Kaori Yoneyama	13:26

== 2011 ==
The third Natsu Onna Kettei Tournament, the second to feature singles wrestlers, took place on August 14, 2011. The tournament featured eight wrestlers, including one outside participant; Hikari Minami from Ice Ribbon. The eventual tournament winner, Tsubasa Kuragaki, went on to unsuccessfully challenge Hailey Hatred for the IMW Hybrid Fighting, JWP Openweight and TLW World Women's Championships on September 23.

First round
Hanako Nakamori	Pin
Tomoko Morii	05:28
Hikari Minami	Pin
Manami Katsu	08:20
Kazuki	Pin
Leon	00:05
Misaki Ohata	Pin
Tsubasa Kuragaki	07:54

Semifinals
Hanako Nakamori	Pin
Hikari Minami	05:25
Leon	Pin
Tsubasa Kuragaki	02:18 (Note: The match originally ended in a ten-minute time limit draw, but was restarted immediately afterwards in order to determine a winner.)

Finals
Hanako Nakamori	Pin
Tsubasa Kuragaki	08:29

== 2012 ==
The fourth and to date final Natsu Onna Kettei Tournament, dubbed the "JRibbon Natsu Onna Kettei Tournament", was the second to feature tag teams and took place during two shows on July 28, 2012; an afternoon show promoted by Ice Ribbon and an evening show promoted by JWP. Eight teams entered the tournament, with each team including one wrestler from Ice Ribbon and one from JWP. The tournament led to a match for the JWP Junior and Princess of Pro-Wrestling Championships between one half of the eventual winners, Ice Ribbon's Maki Narumiya, and JWP's Rabbit Miu, whom she had pinned in her team's semifinal match. Miu eventually defeated Narumiya to retain her title.

First round
Arisa Nakajima; Hikaru Shida	Pin
Hamuko Hoshi; Kayoko Haruyama	10:33
Command Bolshoi; Hikari Minami	Pin
Kazuki; Miyako Matsumoto	07:55
Hanako Nakamori; Maki Narumiya	Pin
Leon; Neko Nitta	13:35
Meari Naito; Sachie Abe	Pin
Rabbit Miu; Tsukasa Fujimoto	13:58

Semifinals
Arisa Nakajima; Hikaru Shida	Pin
Command Bolshoi; Hikari Minami	01:55 (Note: The match originally ended in a fifteen-minute time limit draw, but was restarted immediately afterwards in order to determine a winner.)
Hanako Nakamori; Maki Narumiya	Pin
Rabbit Miu; Tsukasa Fujimoto	07:48

Finals
Arisa Nakajima; Hikaru Shida	Pin
Hanako Nakamori; Maki Narumiya	12:04

== See also ==
- JWP Joshi Puroresu
- Ice Ribbon
