= Maki Narumiya =

Japanese professional wrestler

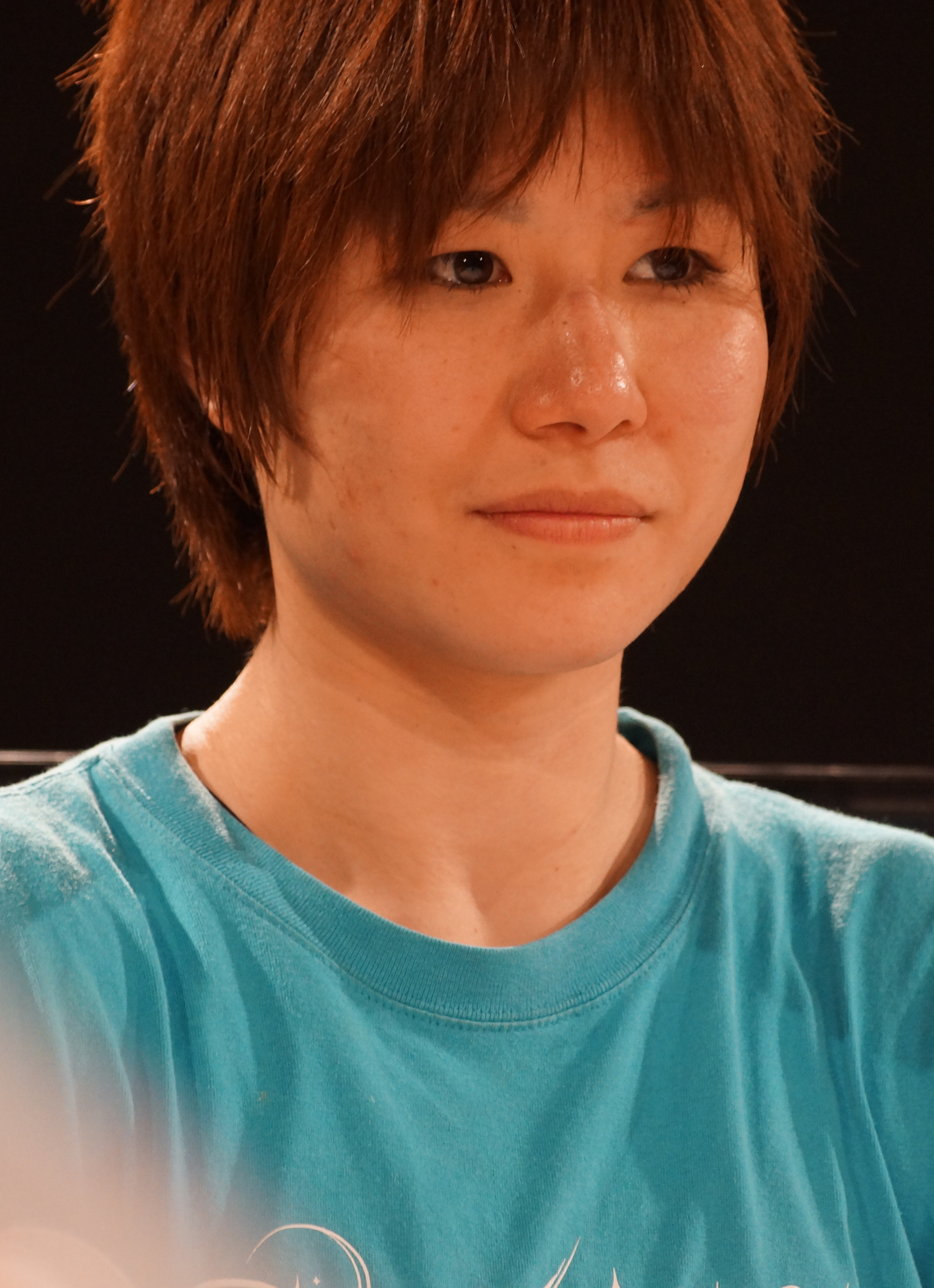
- Narumiya in April 2012

Personal information
- Born: April 7, 1985 (age 41) Kumamoto, Kumamoto

Professional wrestling career
- Ring name(s): Maki Narumiya; Ma♡Ki; Narumiya
- Billed height: 1.63 m (5 ft 4 in)
- Billed weight: 58 kg (128 lb)
- Trained by: Emi Sakura
- Debut: March 19, 2011
- Retired: March 25, 2016

Maki Narumiya (成宮 真希, Narumiya Maki; born April 7, 1985) is a retired Japanese professional wrestler. A former dancer, Narumiya was trained in professional wrestling by Emi Sakura and made her debut for the Ice Ribbon promotion in March 2011. During her four years in the promotion, she became a one-time ICE×60 Champion and two-time International Ribbon Tag Team Champion. In April 2015, Narumiya transferred over to the Reina Joshi Puroresu promotion, where she already was a one-time holder of both the CMLL-Reina International and CMLL-Reina International Junior Championships. She retired from professional wrestling in March 2016.

== Professional wrestling career ==
=== Ice Ribbon (2011–2015) ===
Former dancer and alum of Ochanomizu University, Narumiya began training for a career in professional wrestling under Emi Sakura, who gave her the ring name "Narumiya" after the Chronicles of Narnia films. She made her debut on March 19, 2011, working for Sakura's Ice Ribbon promotion, losing to Mochi Miyagi. Just two days later Narumiya wrestled at her first major Ice Ribbon event, Ice Ribbon March 2011, where she, Riho and Tamako faced Hikari Minami, Kurumi and Tsukushi in a six-woman elimination tag team match. Narumiya was eliminated from the match by Minami, after which her team was defeated, when Tsukushi pinned Riho. On April 20, Narumiya picked up her first win on April 20, defeating Miyako Matsumoto. Narumiya then teamed with Matsumoto at her second major event, Golden Ribbon 2011 on May 5, where the two defeated Hamuko Hoshi and Mochi Miyagi, with Narumiya pinning Hoshi for the win. Narumiya's following months consisted mainly of losses, with her picking up her only wins against fellow newcomer Dorami Nagano. During June, Narumiya formed the N^{3} stable with Meari Naito and Neko Nitta, who debuted around the same time as her. N^{3} wrestled several matches together during the summer, but lost all of them, including three-on-one handicap matches against Hikaru Shida on June 8 and Tsukasa Fujimoto on June 15.

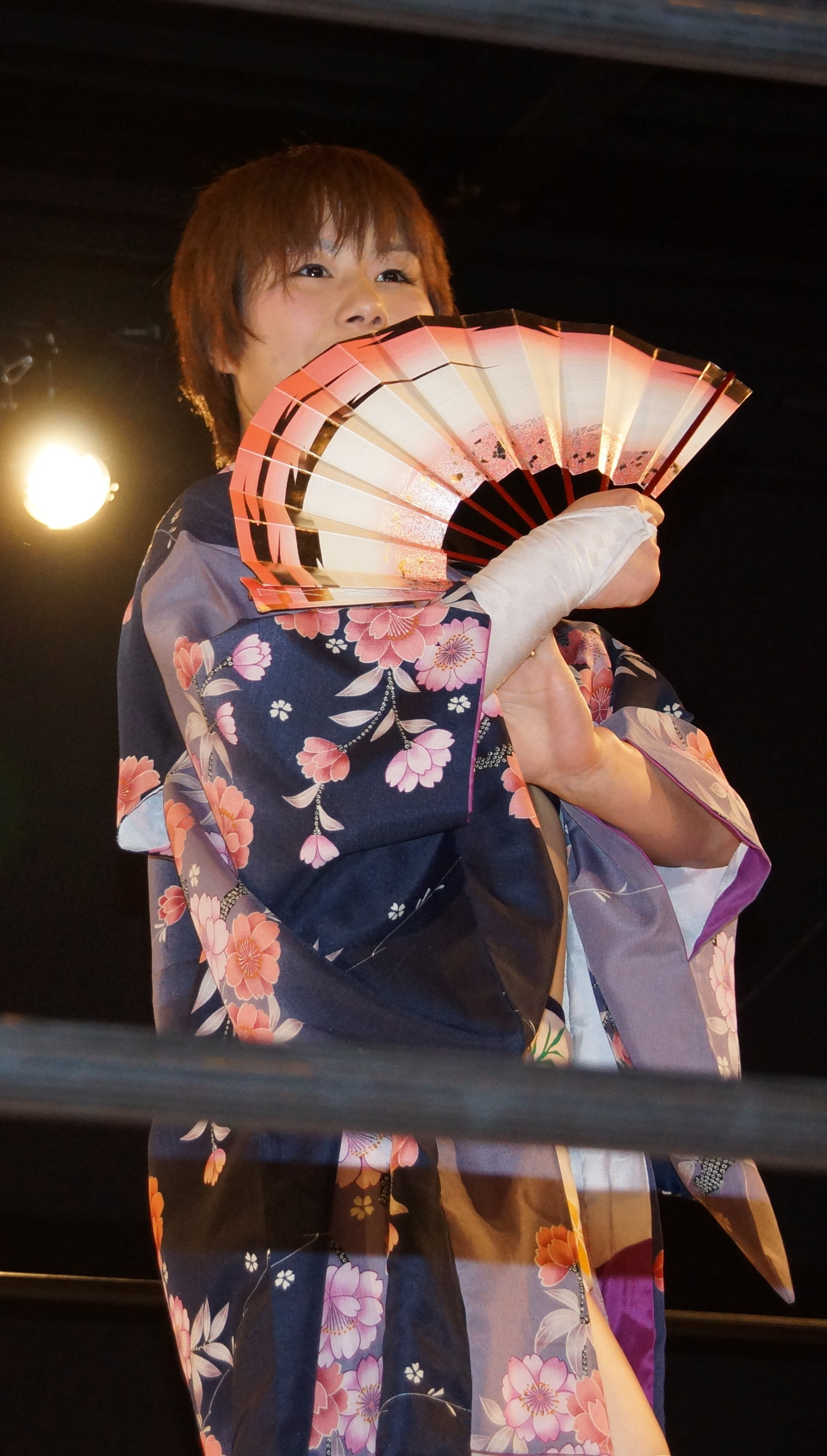
Narumiya before a match in April 2012

On December 3, Narumiya was defeated by Hikaru Shida in a singles match. Afterwards, the two began regularly teaming together, which led to Narumiya winning her first professional wrestling title, when, on December 28, she and Shida defeated Emi Sakura and Tsukushi for the International Ribbon Tag Team Championship. Narumiya and Shida made their first successful title defense on January 7, 2012, defeating the Lovely Butchers (Hamuko Hoshi and Mochi Miyagi). The following day, Narumiya took part in Bull Nakano's retirement event, where she and Oz Academy's Akino faced JWP Joshi Puroresu's Kayoko Haruyama and Sendai Girls' Pro Wrestling's Ryo Mizunami in a "Guillotine Drop match", based around all four using a variation of the leg drop as their finisher. Mizunami won the match for her team by pinning Narumiya. Back in Ice Ribbon, Narumiya and Shida made their second successful defense of the International Ribbon Tag Team Championship on January 25, by defeating Dorami Nagano and Hailey Hatred. Narumiya's and Shida's reign ended on February 5 at Yokohama Ribbon, when they were defeated by Dropkickers (Tsukasa Fujimoto and Tsukushi). On February 12, Narumiya made her debut for Union Pro Wrestling, losing to Cherry. On March 20 at Ice Ribbon March 2012, Narumiya teamed with joshi veteran Toshie Uematsu, in Uematsu's final Ice Ribbon appearance before her retirement, to defeat Hikari Minami and Riho in a tag team match. At the following major event, Golden Ribbon 2012 on May 5, Narumiya entered the second annual Go! Go! Golden Mixed Tag Tournament, teaming with Osaka Pro Wrestling's Masamune. In their first round match, Narumiya and Masamune defeated the previous year's winning team, Makoto Oishi and Neko Nitta. After defeating Hikaru Sato and Riho in the semifinals, Narumiya and Masamune advanced to the finals, where they were defeated by Kurumi and Ribbon Takanashi.

On May 19, Narumiya scored an upset pinfall win over her former partner, the reigning ICE×60 Champion Hikaru Shida, in a tag team match, where she teamed with Aki Shizuku and Shida with Tsukasa Fujimoto. After a non-title match between the two on May 26 ended in a ten-minute time limit draw, Narumiya was named the number one contender to the ICE×60 Championship, provided she could make the 60 kg (130 lb) weight limit. Narumiya received her first shot at Ice Ribbon's top title on June 17 at the promotion's sixth anniversary event, but was unable dethrone Shida. On July 7, the N^{3} stable produced their first own Ice Ribbon event, which saw Narumiya defeat Meari Naito in the main event. As part of a working relationship between Ice Ribbon and JWP, Narumiya made her debut for JWP on July 8, losing to Hanako Nakamori. Afterwards, the two agreed to team up in the upcoming JRibbon Natsu Onna Kettei Tournament. This time the tournament, a JWP staple, was co-produced by JWP and Ice Ribbon, being split up into two "JRibbon" events on July 28; an Ice Ribbon event in the afternoon and a JWP event in the evening. During the Ice Ribbon event, Narumiya and Nakamori defeated Leon and Neko Nitta to advance to the JWP event, where they defeated Tsukasa Fujimoto and Rabbit Miu in their semifinal match. Later that same event, Narumiya and Nakamori defeated Arisa Nakajima and Hikaru Shida in the finals to win the 2012 Natsu Onna Kettei Tournament. After the match, Rabbit Miu, upset about being pinned by Narumiya in the semifinal match, entered the ring and offered her a shot at the JWP Junior and Princess of Pro-Wrestling Championships. Narumiya accepted the offer and the title match between the two was made official for August 19. On July 31, Narumiya made her debut for DDT Pro-Wrestling, taking part in an "Ice Ribbon offer match", where she and Tsukushi were defeated by Hikaru Shida and Neko Nitta. On August 7, Narumiya made her debut for Pro Wrestling Wave, once again pinning Rabbit Miu in a tag team match, where she teamed with Yuu Yamagata and Miu with Tsukasa Fujimoto. A week before their title match, Narumiya earned another pinfall victory over Miu in the main event of a JWP event, where she teamed with Kagetsu and Miu with JWP Openweight Champion Kayoko Haruyama. Later that same day, Narumiya joined Leon's Shishi no Ana stable, becoming a regular member of JWP's roster. On August 19, Narumiya was defeated by Miu in the match for the JWP Junior and Princess of Pro-Wrestling Championships. Back in Ice Ribbon later that same day, Narumiya teamed with Meari Naito to unsuccessfully challenge Hikaru Shida and Tsukasa Fujimoto for the Reina World Tag Team Championship.

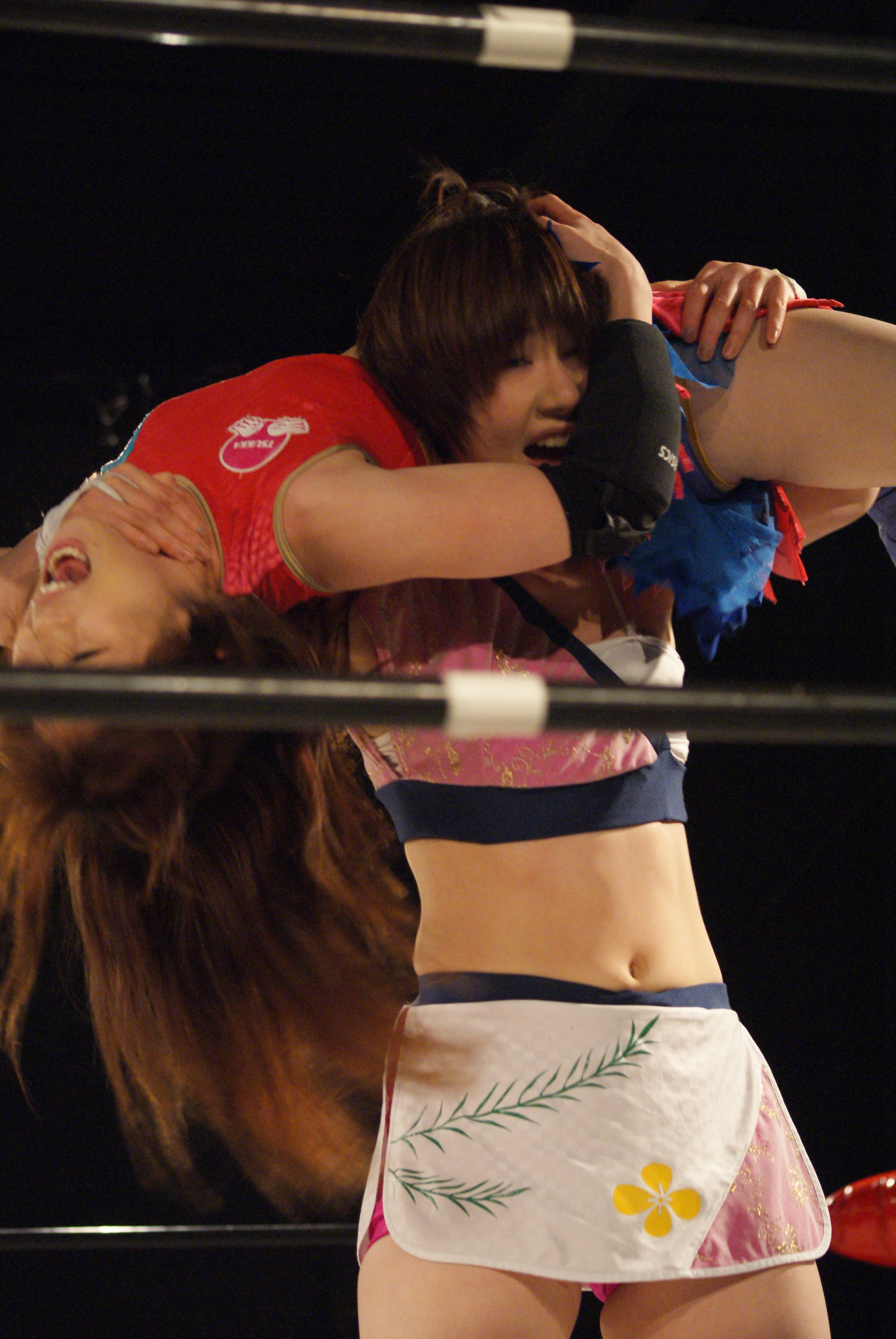
Narumiya performs an Argentine backbreaker rack on Tsukasa Fujimoto, 2012

Afterwards, Narumiya went on a seventeen match losing streak, before finally defeating Miyako Matsumoto on November 28, debuting her new finishing maneuver, the Yuruneba, in the process. On December 8, Narumiya defeated Hikaru Shida and Tsukushi in a three-way match to become the number one contender to ICE×60 Champion Mio Shirai at Ice Ribbon's biggest event of the year, RibbonMania 2012. At the event on December 31, Narumiya defeated Shirai to win the ICE×60 Championship for the first time. Narumiya wrestled her first match since her title win on January 5, 2013, pinning Hikaru Shida in a tag team main event, where she and Hamuko Hoshi faced Shida and Oz Academy representative Aja Kong. Following the match, Narumiya began complaining about severe neck pain and two days later Ice Ribbon announced that she had suffered a spinal cord injury and would be sidelined indefinitely. As a result of her injury, Narumiya vacated the ICE×60 Championship on January 12, ending her reign at just twelve days, the shortest reign in the title's history. Narumiya returned to Ice Ribbon on June 15, announcing that she had moved back to Tokyo from Kumamoto to start training for her upcoming return match. Narumiya wrestled her return match on August 25, losing to N^{3} stablemate Neko Nitta. She picked up her first win since her return on September 22 over Risa Sera. On October 6, Narumiya made her debut for Wrestle-1, losing to Akino in a singles match. Back in Ice Ribbon, Narumiya started a storyline rivalry with Mio Shirai, which built to a singles match on December 7, where Narumiya was victorious. Following the win, Narumiya was named the number one contender to the renamed and now weight limitless ICE×∞ Championship at RibbonMania 2013. Prior to the match, Narumiya entered a storyline, where she was coaxed into giving up the guillotine leg drop finisher by the defending champion, Tsukasa Fujimoto, who claimed she could not defeat her without the move. Narumiya had earlier claimed that the move had caused her spinal cord injury a year earlier. On December 31, Narumiya failed in her title challenge against Fujimoto. During the match, Narumiya hit the guillotine leg drop, but in storyline hurt herself with it more than her opponent, leading to her losing the match.

On January 25, 2014, Narumiya and Risa Sera defeated Hamuko Hoshi and Tsukushi in the finals of a four-team tournament to become the number one contenders to the International Ribbon Tag Team Championship. The team, now known as ".STAP", received its title shot on February 15, but was defeated by Muscle Venus (Hikaru Shida and Tsukasa Fujimoto). On March 30, after the International Ribbon Tag Team Championship had been vacated due to Hikaru Shida's resignation from Ice Ribbon, .STAP defeated Kurumi and Tsukushi in a decision match to become the new champions. On April 6, Narumiya made her debut for Wrestling New Classic (WNC), teaming with Makoto to defeat Kaho Kobayashi and Syuri in a tag team match. .STAP made their first successful title defense on May 6 against Narumiya's N^{3} stablemates Meari Naito and Neko Nitta. Four days later, N^{3} produced their second Ice Ribbon event, which also marked the stable's final appearance together before disbanding. On June 7 at Ice Ribbon's eighth anniversary event, .STAP made their second successful title defense against the Lovely Butchers. They continued making successful defenses for the rest of the year, defeating Kaho Kobayashi and Makoto on June 29, Mio Shirai and Yuka on July 21, Hamuko Hoshi and Kurumi on August 10, Haruusagi (Rabbit Miu and Tsukushi) on September 15, Cherry and Meari Naito on November 24, and finally Angel Nuts (Kurumi and Yuka) on December 28 at Ribbon Mania 2014. On December 31, Narumiya defeated former training partner and longtime stablemate Meari Naito in her retirement match. On January 12, 2015, .STAP tied the record for most successful defenses in the history of the International Ribbon Tag Team Championship by making their ninth defense against Cherry and Ryuji Ito in a hardcore match. On February 3, the 310th day of their reign, Narumiya and Sera became the longest-reigning champions in the history of the International Ribbon Tag Team Championship. Their reign of 356 days ended on March 21, when they were defeated by Shishunki (Mio Shirai and Tsukushi) in their tenth title defense. Following the loss of the title, Narumiya disbanded .STAP, leading to a storyline rivalry between her and Sera. On April 1, Narumiya and representatives of both Ice Ribbon and Reina Joshi Puroresu held a press conference to announce that she was leaving Ice Ribbon and transferring over to Reina. Narumiya announced that she was moving to Reina largely in order to be able to return to CMLL.

=== Reina Joshi Puroresu (2014–2016) ===
On May 25, 2014, Narumiya made an appearance for the Reina Joshi Puroresu promotion, unsuccessfully challenging La Amapola for the CMLL-Reina International Championship. She returned to the promotion on August 8 and defeated Silueta to become the new CMLL-Reina International Junior Champion. She held the title for three weeks, before losing it back to Silueta in her first title defense. Through Reina's working relationship with the Consejo Mundial de Lucha Libre (CMLL) promotion, Narumiya, along with Makoto, traveled to Mexico for a two-week tour with the promotion. They made their debuts on October 14, teaming with La Comandante in a six-woman tag team match, where they defeated Estrellita, Goya Kong and Princesa Sugehit. Narumiya remained in CMLL until October 24.

On March 25, 2015, Narumiya defeated La Amapola to win the CMLL-Reina International Championship for the first time. After signing with Reina, Narumiya returned to CMLL in April 2015. Her two-week tour culminated on April 28 with her losing the CMLL-Reina International Championship to Princesa Sugehit. A rematch between the two took place back in Reina on May 5 and saw Sugehit retain her title. Another rematch took place on May 17 and saw Narumiya defeat Sugehit to regain the CMLL-Reina International Championship. On June 24, Narumiya took part in a Risa Sera produced Ice Ribbon event, where she teamed with Isami Kodaka and Yuko Miyamoto to defeat Sera, Kankuro Hoshino and Masato Inaba in a six-person intergender human hair deathmatch, after which the two former .STAP partners made peace with each other and ended their rivalry. On July 10, Narumiya made her first successful defense of the CMLL-Reina International Championship against La Comandante. On December 26, Narumiya received a shot at the Reina World Women's Championship, but was defeated by the defending champion, Ice Ribbon's Tsukasa Fujimoto. On January 17, 2016, Narumiya announced she was getting married and retiring from professional wrestling on March 25. On March 12, Narumiya returned to Ice Ribbon for a farewell appearance, reuniting with Risa Sera to unsuccessfully challenge Arisa Nakajima and Tsukasa Fujimoto for the International Ribbon Tag Team Championship. Due to her impending retirement, Narumia relinquished the CMLL-Reina International Championship on March 16. On March 25, Narumiya wrestled her final two matches. First she teamed with fellow Narcissist-gun members Syuri, Buffalo and Mineo Fujita in an eight-person tag team match, where they defeated the Shiri Gamikyō stable of Hikaru Shida, Gabaiji-chan, Toru Owashi and Yako Fujigasaki, and then she teamed with Syuri to defeat Maya Yukihi and Risa Sera in her retirement match.

== Championships and accomplishments ==
- Ice Ribbon
  - ICE×60 Championship (1 time)
  - International Ribbon Tag Team Championship (2 times) – with Hikaru Shida (1) and Risa Sera (1)
  - Next Ribbon Tag Team Championship Challenger Determination Tournament (2014) – with Risa Sera
- JWP Joshi Puroresu
  - JRibbon Natsu Onna Kettei Tournament (2012) – with Hanako Nakamori
- Reina Joshi Puroresu
  - CMLL-Reina International Championship (2 times)
  - CMLL-Reina International Junior Championship (1 time)
