= Azumi Hyuga =

Japanese professional wrestler

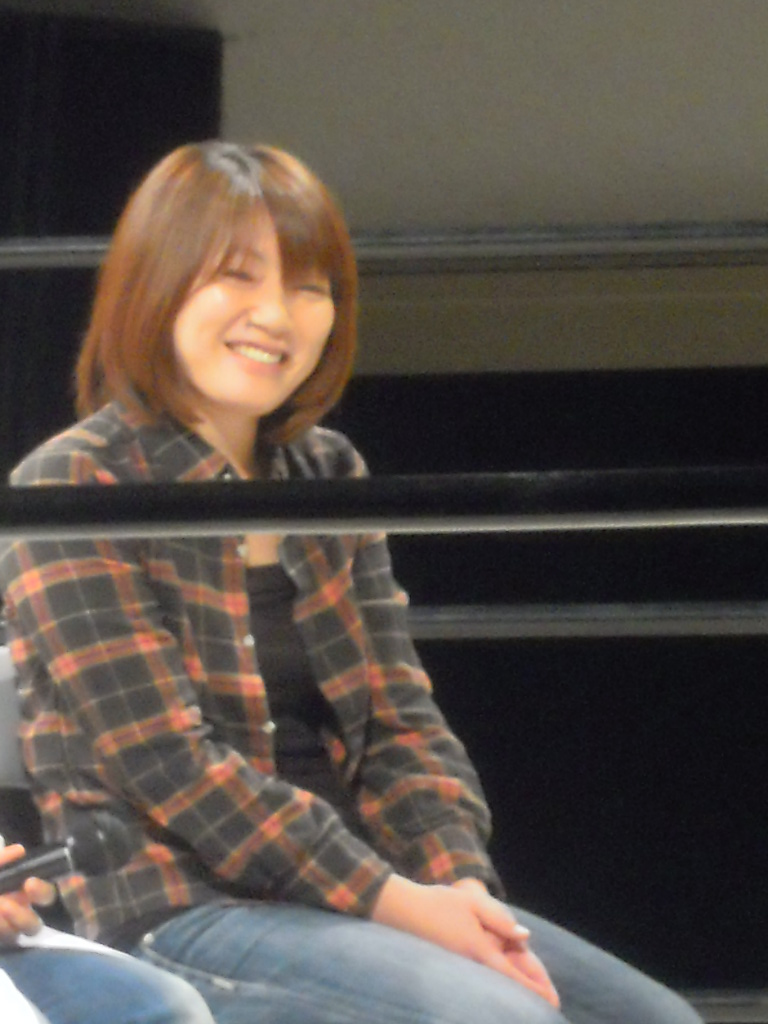
- Hyuga in October 2011

Personal information
- Born: January 6, 1975 (age 51) Chiba, Japan

Professional wrestling career
- Ring name(s): Azumi Haruyama; Tomoko Kuzumi; Tiger Honey; Nise Leon; Azumi Hyuga
- Billed height: 168 cm (5 ft 6 in)
- Billed weight: 56 kg (123 lb)
- Trained by: Devil Masami; Cutie Suzuki
- Debut: 1995
- Retired: 2009

Tomoko Kuzumi (泉朋子, Izumi Tomoko) better known by her ring name Azumi Hyuga is a Japanese retired professional wrestler best known for her tenure with various Japanese promotions such as All Japan Women's Pro-Wrestling, JWP Joshi Puroresu and NEO Japan Ladies Pro-Wrestling.

== Professional wrestling career ==
=== Independent circuit (1995–2009) ===
As a freelancer, Kuzumi is known for competing in multiple promotions of the Japanese independent scene. On the fourth night of the Starlet tournament of Arsion which took place on April 6, 2003, Kuzumi teamed up with Baby-A and Mariko Yoshida in a losing effort against Bionic J, Gami and Police Woman as a result of a best two out of three falls six-woman tag team match. At JDStar Fighting Beauty ~ Dreamer ~ on December 17, 2005, Kuzumi defeated Kana. At NEO Be Happy Again ~ 10th Anniversary, an event promoted by NEO Japan Ladies Pro-Wrestling on January 6, 2008, she participated in a 30-person battle royal won by Mima Shimoda and also involving Etsuko Mita, Munenori Sawa, Nagisa Nozaki, Arisa Nakajima, Tomoka Nakagawa, Tanny Mouse and others. She made sporadic appearances for Oz Academy with the last one taking place on October 11, 2009, at OZ Academy OZ-Supernatural where she teamed up with Mayumi Ozaki to defeat Carlos Amano and Dynamite Kansai. At WAVE Launch WAVE, an event promoted by Pro Wrestling Wave on December 13, 2009, she competed in a 20-person royal rumble match won by Ryo Mizunami and also involving Io Shirai, Aja Kong, Cherry, Moeka Haruhi, Ayumi Kurihara, Misaki Ohata and two invisible wrestlers lbert Neklenburg and Arnold Skeskejanaker.

She also made sporadic appearances in men's promotions, working as a female talent in both exhibition and legit matches. At Osaka Pro Story #12 In Tokyo, an event promoted by Osaka Pro Wrestling on June 11, 2002, she teamed up with Kuishinbo Kamen and Akagi to defeat Daikokusan, Ebessan and Policewoman. On the sixth night of New Japan Pro Wrestling's G1 Climax on August 10, 2002, she teamed up with Command Bolshoi and Ran Yu-Yu to defeat Kaori Yoneyama, Kayoko Haruyama and Tsubasa Kuragaki in a six-man tag team match. At BJW Cabaret Wrestling Part 1, an event promoted by Big Japan Pro Wrestling on June 27, 2003, she teamed up with Aliya in a losing effort against Bolshoi Kid and Jaguar Yokota.

==== Consejo Mundial de Lucha Libre (2003) ====
Kuzumi briefly competed in the Mexican independent scene, working in a couple of matches promoted by Consejo Mundial de Lucha Libre. The last of them took place at CMLL Super Viernes on August 1, 2003, where she teamed up with Marcela to defeat Command Bolshoi and La Amapola.

=== JWP Joshi Puroresu (1995–2009) ===
Kuzumi worked for most of her career in JWP Joshi Puroresu. She made her professional wrestling debut on January 14, 1995, at a house show where she teamed up with Chikayo Nagashima to defeat Yuki Miyazaki and an undocumented opponent. She is known for competing in signature events of the promotion such as the Natsu Onna Kettei Tournament, making her only appearance in the 2009 edition where she defeated Ayako Sato in the first-rounds but fell short to Toshie Uematsu in the second round.

Kuzumi retired on December 27, 2009, having wrestled her last match at JWP Climax 2009 ~ Azumi Hyuga FINAL ~ event where she competed in two matches. First of them, a battle royal won by her long time tag team partner Ran Yu-Yu and also involving notable opponents such as The Great Kabuki, Meiko Satomura, Kyoko Kimura and others. In the other match, she teamed up with Command Bolshoi in a losing effort against Kaori Yoneyama and Kayoko Haruyama.

=== Ice Ribbon (2007–2009) ===
Another promotion in which Kuzumi evolved was Ice Ribbon. She made her first appearance at Ice Ribbon Future Star Vol. 1 on April 28, 2007, where she defeated Aoi Kizuki. On the second night of the 2009 JWP Climax, an event shared with Ice Ribbon on December 13, Kuzumi teamed up with Ran Yu-Yu to defeat Emi Sakura and Kaori Yoneyama for the International Ribbon Tag Team Championship. She made her last appearance for the promotion on December 12, 2009, at New Ice Ribbon #140 where she teamed up with Makoto to defeat Kazumi Shimouma and Nanae Takahashi.

=== Brief return to professional wrestling (2017) ===
Kuzumi came out of retirement after eight years at JWP Fly High In The 25th Anniversary Party on April 2, 2017, where she competed as a surprise entrant into a 17-person battle royal also involving Dash Chisako, Hana Kimura, Natsumi Maki, Yako Fujigasaki, Sachie Abe, Aoi Kizuki and others.

== Championships and accomplishments ==
- All Japan Women's Pro-Wrestling
  - WWWA All Pacific Championship (1 time)
- Ice Ribbon
  - International Ribbon Tag Team Championship (1 time) – with Ran Yu-Yu
- JWP Joshi Puroresu
  - JWP Openweight Championship (4 times)
  - JWP Junior Championship (1 time)
  - JWP Tag Team Championship (5 times) – with Hikari Fukuoka (2), Kayoko Haruyama (1) and Ran Yu-Yu (2)
  - JWP Korakuen Tag Team Championship (2 times) – with Yuki Miyazaki and Kanoko Motoya
  - Heart Beat Eternal Rival League (2002)
  - JWP Year End-Award (11 times)
    - Most Valuable Player Award (2001, 2006, 2007, 2009)
    - Best Bout Award (2001) vs. Command Bolshoi on November 21
    - Best Bout Award (2002) vs. Ran Yu-Yu on May 19
    - Best Bout Award (2003) with Kyoko Kimura and Yuki Miyazaki vs. Command Bolshoi, Erika Watanabe and Kayoko Haruyama on August 16
    - Best Bout Award (2004) vs. Kayoko Haruyama on November 28
    - Best Bout Award (2005) vs. Kaoru Ito on May 15
    - Best Bout Award (2006) vs. Yoshiko Tamura on December 24
    - Best Bout Award (2009) vs. Kayoko Haruyama on April 12
- NEO Japan Ladies Pro-Wrestling
  - NWA Women's Pacific/NEO Single Championship (1 time)
  - NEO Hall Of Fame (2010)
- Pure-J
  - Daily Sports Women's Tag Team Championship (1 time) – with Ran Yu-Yu
