= Pure-J Openweight Championship =

Professional wrestling women's championship

- Current design of the title

Details
- Promotion: Pure-J
- Date established: October 9, 2017
- Current champion: Hanako Nakamori
- Date won: January 4, 2026
Statistics
- First champion: Hanako Nakamori
- Most reigns: Hanako Nakamori (6 reigns)
- Longest reign: Hanako Nakamori (5th reign, 602 days)
- Shortest reign: Leon (1st reign, 21 days)
- Oldest champion: Leon (40 years, 24 days) (Note: The date of birth of Command Bolshoi is unknown, therefore, this stat might be inaccurate.)
- Youngest champion: Hanako Nakamori (28 years, 312 days)
- Heaviest champion: Yuu; 95 kg (209 lb)
- Lightest champion: Command Bolshoi; 45 kg (99 lb)

The Pure-J Openweight Championship (Japanese: PURE-J認定無差別級王座, Hepburn: PURE-J Nintei Musabetsu Kyūōza) is a women's professional wrestling championship owned by the Pure-J promotion. The championship, which is situated at the top of Pure-J's championship hierarchy, was introduced on October 9, 2017, when Hanako Nakamori defeated Manami Katsu in the finals of a 12-woman tournament to become the inaugural champion. Like most professional wrestling championships, the title is won as a result of a scripted match.

There have been a total of seventeen reigns shared between nine different wrestlers. Hanako Nakamori is the current champion in her sixth reign.

== Reigns ==
As of October 13, 2026, there have been 17 reigns between nine champions. Hanako Nakamori was the inaugural champion, and holds the record for most reigns at five. Nakamori's third reign is the longest at 462 days, while Leon's first reign is the shortest at 21 days. Leon is the oldest champion at 40 years old, while Nakamori is the youngest at 28 years old.

Hanako Nakamori is the current champion in her first reign. She won the title by defeating Saki at PURE-J 2026 First Battle on January 4, 2026, in Tokyo, Japan.

Key
No.	Overall reign number
Reign	Reign number for the specific champion
Days	Number of days held
Defenses	Number of successful defenses
+	Current reign is changing daily

No.	Champion	Championship change			Reign statistics			Notes	Ref.
No.	Champion	Date	Event	Location	Reign	Days	Defenses	Notes	Ref.
1	Hanako Nakamori	October 9, 2017	Televised show	Tokyo, Japan	1	69	0	Nakamori defeated Manami Katsu in the finals of a 12-woman tournament to become the inaugural champion.	
2	Dash Chisako	December 17, 2017	Climax	Tokyo, Japan	1	63	1	This was a Hair vs. Hair match.	
3	Hanako Nakamori	February 18, 2018	Rainbow Series - Day 4	Osaka, Japan	2	364	6		
4	Command Bolshoi	February 17, 2019	Bolshoi Final Series Vol. 3	Tokyo, Japan	1	42	1		
5	Leon	March 31, 2019	Bolshoi Final in Nagoya	Nagoya, Aichi, Japan	1	21	0		
6	Hanako Nakamori	April 21, 2019	Bolshoi Retirement ~ Thank You!!	Tokyo, Japan	3	462	5		
7	Leon	July 26, 2020	Fight Together!	Tokyo, Japan	2	237	3		
8	Kaori Yoneyama	March 20, 2021	Fight Together!	Tokyo, Japan	1	22	4		
9	Rydeen Hagane	April 11, 2021	Fight Together!	Tokyo, Japan	1	102	0		
10	Leon	July 22, 2021	Discover New Heroine Tag Tournament 2021	Tokyo, Japan	3	361	6		
11	Hanako Nakamori	July 18, 2022	Road to Pure-J 5th Anniversary	Tokyo, Japan	4	24	0		
12	Yuu	August 11, 2022	Pure-J Rainbow Mountain 2022	Tokyo, Japan	1	129	2		
13	Hanako Nakamori	December 18, 2022	Pure-J Climax 2022	Tokyo, Japan	5	602	7		
14	Risa Sera	August 11, 2024	PURE-J 7th Anniversary	Tokyo, Japan	1	126	2		
15	Rydeen Hagane	December 15, 2024	PURE-J J-Climax 2024	Tokyo, Japan	2	142	3		
16	Saki	May 6, 2025	PURE-J Maniax 2025	Tokyo, Japan	1	243	6		
17	Hanako Nakamori	January 4, 2026	PURE-J 2026 First Battle	Tokyo, Japan	6	282+	5		

== Combined reigns ==
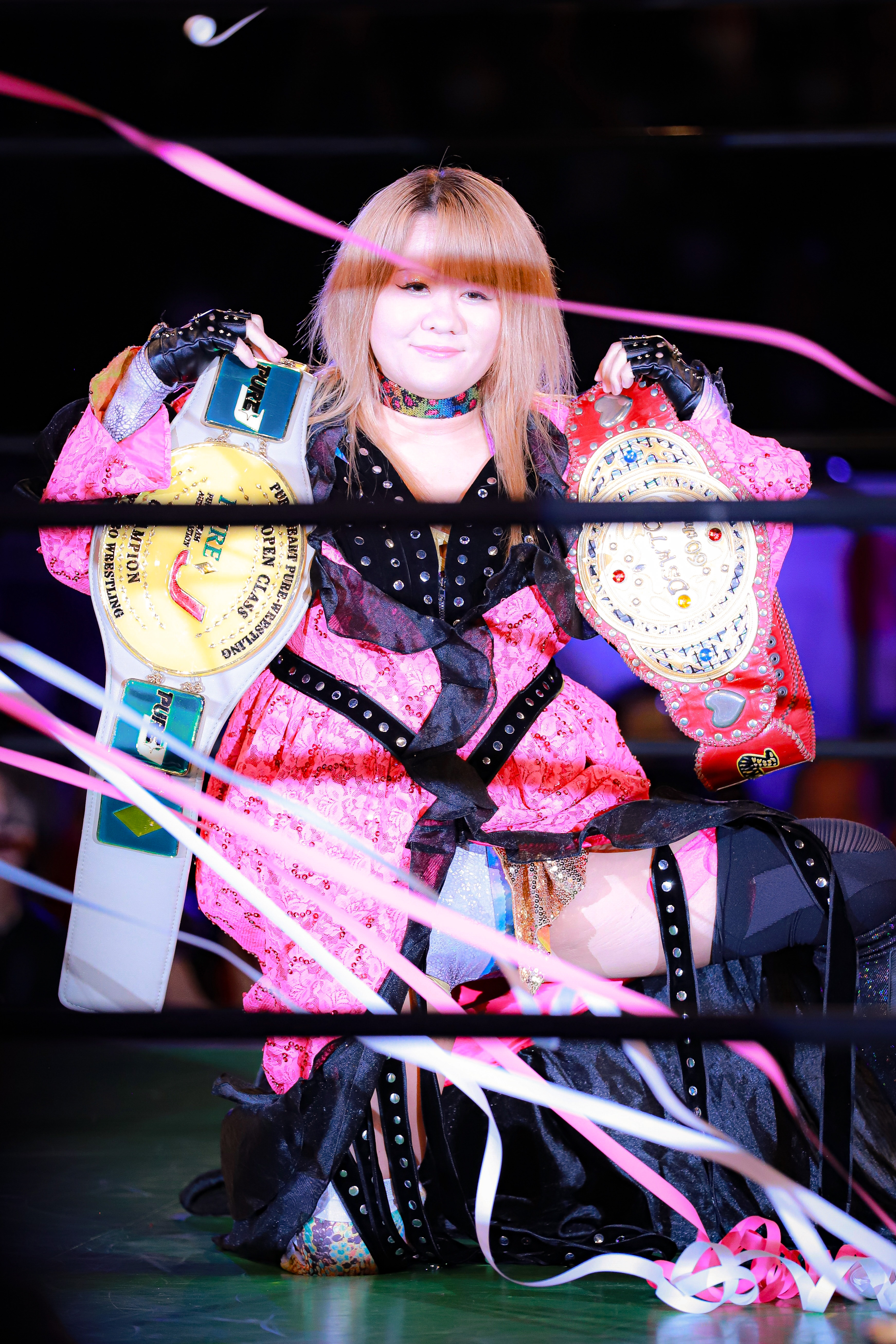
Current champion Hanako Nakamori is a record six-time champion and holds the records for combined days as champion and combined defenses.

As of October 13, 2026.

†	Indicates the current champion

Rank	Wrestler	No. of reigns	Combined defenses	Combined days
1	Hanako Nakamori †	6	23	1,803+
2	Leon	3	9	619
3	Rydeen Hagane	2	3	244
4	Saki	1	6	243
5	Yuu	1	2	129
6	Risa Sera	1	2	126
7	Dash Chisako	1	1	63
8	Command Bolshoi	1	1	42
9	Kaori Yoneyama	1	4	22
