= JWP Joshi Puroresu =

Japanese professional wrestling promotion

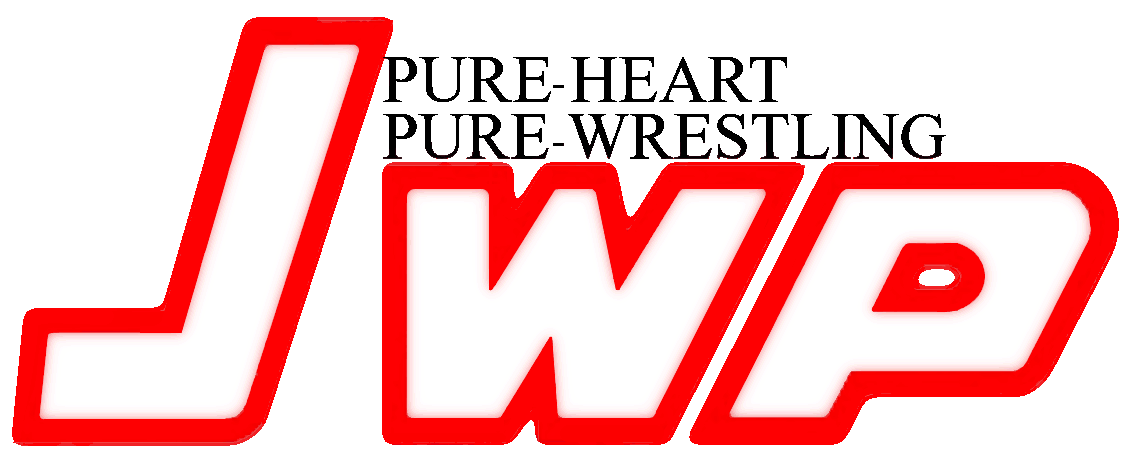
- Acronym: JWP
- Founded: April 3, 1992
- Defunct: April 2, 2017
- Style: Joshi puroresu
- Headquarters: Adachi, Tokyo
- Founder: Masatoshi Yamamoto
- Owner: Kiyoshi Shinozaki
- Split from: Japan Women's Pro-Wrestling
- Successor: Pure-J
- Website: JWP-Produce.com

JWP Joshi Puroresu (JWP女子プロレス, JWP Joshi Puroresu), also known as JWP Project (JWPプロジェクト, JWP Purojekuto) or simply JWP, was a Japanese joshi puroresu (women's professional wrestling) promotion, founded in 1992 as a splinter promotion of Japan Women's Pro-Wrestling. Celebrating its 25th anniversary at the time of its folding in 2017, JWP was the oldest joshi puroresu promotion in Japan and its Openweight Championship was the oldest championship in all of joshi. Command Bolshoi, who had worked for the promotion since the beginning, served as the final president of JWP. The promotion's slogan was "Pure Heart, Pure Wrestling".

== History ==
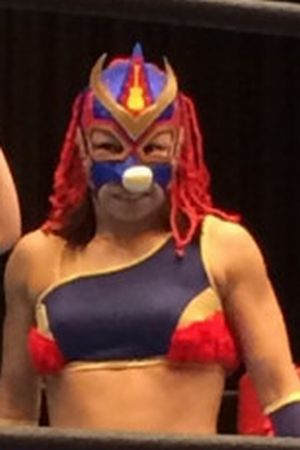
Command Bolshoi

JWP Joshi Puroresu was founded in early 1992, when Japan Women's Pro-Wrestling (JWP), ravaged by internal politics, split up into two camps, dubbed the "shooters" and the "entertainers", and eventually folded on January 18. The "shooter" side went on to form Ladies Legend Pro-Wrestling (LLPW), while the "entertainer" side, led by Jackie Sato and financed by Masatoshi Yamamoto, founded JWP Project, later renamed JWP Joshi Puroresu, which held its first event on April 3, 1992. Already the following year, JWP managed to sign a television deal with the WOWOW channel. In 1994, Jaleco published the JWP Joshi Pro Wrestling: Pure Wrestle Queens (JWP女子プロレス ピュア・レッスル・クイーンズ, JWP Joshi Puroresu Pyua Ressuru Kuīnzu) video game for the Super Famicom game console.

JWP's goal from the start was to rival All Japan Women's Pro-Wrestling (AJW), the top joshi puroresu promotion in the country, but always remained in its shadow. After closing the gap between the two promotions in 1996, JWP was hit hard in 1997, when two of its top workers, Candy Okutsu and Hiromi Yagi retired, Dynamite Kansai was sidelined with health problems and finally, when, on August 16, another top worker, Plum Mariko, died in the ring during one of its events. These were followed by Jackie Sato's death from stomach cancer on August 9, 1999. After a co-promoted event with AJW in February 2000 turned out to be a failure, JWP closed its doors at the end of the year. However, the promotion returned just a few months later, now under new management, headed by wrestler Command Bolshoi. JWP continued working with former rival promotion AJW until the promotion folded in April 2005. JWP then adopted AJW's premier wrestling tournament, Tag League the Best, and also inherited the promotion's old sponsor, the Daily Sports newspaper, which led to JWP most notably introducing the Daily Sports Women's Tag Team Championship in August 2008.

JWP not only trained a large number of wrestlers, but was also able to recruit wrestlers from other folding joshi puroresu promotions, including Arisa Nakajima, Leon and Sachie Abe from AtoZ, Kazuki from JDStar and Hanako Nakamori and Tomoko Morii from Ito Dojo, while also employing freelancers such as Emi Sakura, Kana and Misaki Ohata. JWP had a close working relationship with the Ice Ribbon promotion. JWP also had a relationship with American promotion Chikara, with Hanako Nakamori, Tsubasa Kuragaki and Kaori Yoneyama, a replacement for an injured Command Bolshoi, representing the promotion at Chikara's JoshiMania weekend in December 2011. JWP has also participated in Chikara's premier tournament, the King of Trios, on two occasions, with Bolshoi, Kuragaki and Yoneyama participating in 2012, and Bolshoi, Hanako Nakamori and Manami Katsu in 2016.

On February 8, 2017, JWP held a press conference to announce that the promotion would fold following its 25th anniversary event on April 2, 2017, after which all of its wrestlers would become freelancers. The group's contract with the JWP production company was set to expire in April and the two sides had not been able to come to terms on a new one. Bolshoi would remain in charge of Pure Dream kabushiki gaisha, which she had established the previous November and through which she would launch a new promotion on August 11, 2017. The new company would retain control of the Daily Sports Women's Tag Team and Princess of Pro-Wrestling Championships, while the JWP name and the JWP Openweight, Tag Team and Junior Championships all remained with the JWP production company. JWP's folding marked the end of the oldest women's professional wrestling promotion still in operation at that point in time. The following month, it was announced that Bolshoi's new promotion would be called "Pure-J". JWP's final show in Korakuen Hall on April 2, 2017, was attended by 1,180 people, and featured appearances by several wrestlers from the promotion's past, including Azumi Hyuga, Cutie Suzuki, Dynamite Kansai, Hikari Fukuoka, Kayoko Haruyama and Mayumi Ozaki.

== Final roster ==
=== Wrestlers ===
Ring name	Real name
Command Bolshoi	Unknown
Hanako Nakamori	Hanako Kobayashi
Ibis Sara	Itsuka Fukuda
Kazuki	Kazuko Fujiwara
Leon	Rena Takase
Manami Katsu	Manami Katsu
Morii	Tomoko Morii
Rino	Rino Orikono
Rydeen Hagane	Noriko Matsumoto
Yako Fujigasaki	Yako Fujigasaki
Yua Hayashi	Yua Hayashi

=== Notable alumni/guests ===
- Akane Fujita
- Aoi Kizuki
- Arisa Nakajima
- Ayako Sato
- Azumi Hyuga
- Candy Okutsu
- Carlos Amano
- Cutie Suzuki
- Devil Masami
- Dynamite Kansai
- Emi Sakura
- Erika Watanabe
- Gami
- Hailey Hatred
- Kazumi Shimouma
- Kiyoko Ichiki
- Hiragi Kurumi
- Hiromi Yagi
- Jackie Sato
- Kana
- Kaori Yoneyama
- Kaoru Ito/Zap I
- Kayoko Haruyama
- Kazuki
- Keiko Aono
- Mayumi Ozaki
- Mika Iida
- Mika Iwata
- Misae Genki
- Misaki Ohata
- Miyuki Takase
- Moon Mizuki
- Nana Kawasa
- Neko Nitta
- Plum Mariko
- Rabbit Miu
- Ran Yu-Yu
- Sachie Abe
- Sawako Shimono
- Sakura Hirota
- Saki
- Sayaka Obihiro
- Saya
- Tanny Mouse
- Tomoko Watanabe/Zap T
- Toshie Uematsu
- Tsubasa Kuragaki
- Yuu Yamagata

=== Staff ===
- Tessy Sugo (referee)

== Championships ==
=== Singles ===
Championship	Date of entry	First champion	Date retired	Final champion	Years active	Notes
JWP Openweight Championship	December 2, 1992	Dynamite Kansai	April 2, 2017	Hanako Nakamori	24	The title was retired when JWP Joshi Puroresu goes out of business.
JWP Junior Championship	June 16, 1995	Candy Okutsu	April 2, 2017	Yako Fujigasaki	21	The title was retired when JWP Joshi Puroresu goes out of business.
Princess of Pro-Wrestling Championship	June 17, 2007	Tyrannosaurus Okuda	April 2, 2017	Yako Fujigasaki	9	Originally created in JDStar, the title was defended at JWP Joshi Puroresu with the closing of JDStar. On April 2, 2017, after the closing of JWP, Pure-J owned the rights of the title.

=== Tag Team ===
Championship	Date of entry	First champion	Date retired	Final champion	Years active	Notes
Daily Sports Women's Tag Team Championship	August 3, 2008	Harukura (Kayoko Haruyama and Tsubasa Kuragaki)	April 2, 2017	P-Ray-L (Command Bolshoi and Leon)	8	On April 2, 2017, after the closing of JWP, Pure-J owned the rights of the title.
JWP Korakuen Tag Team Championship	April 21, 1996	Tomoko Kuzumi and Yuki Miyazaki	1997	Kanoko Motoya and Tomoko Kuzumi	1	The championship was deactivated for undocumented reasons. The exact date the title was deactivated is uncertain, somewhere in 2017 at or after September 20, where Kuzumi and Motoya won the title.
JWP Tag Team Championship	August 9, 1992	Cutie Suzuki and Mayumi Ozaki	April 2, 2017	Command Bolshoi and Leon	24	The title was retired when JWP Joshi Puroresu goes out of business.

== Tournaments ==
Tournament	Last winner(s)	Last held	Notes
JWP Tag League the Best / JWP Tag Tournament	Makafushigi (Hanako Nakamori and Makoto)	February 21, 2016	Round-robin tournament, with a head-to-head final match between the top two teams. Held in a single-elimination format in 2016.
Natsu Onna Kettei Tournament	Hanako Nakamori and Maki Narumiya	July 28, 2012	Single-elimination tournament; every other year for tag teams and every other for singles wrestlers.
