= Manami Katsu =

Japanese professional wrestler

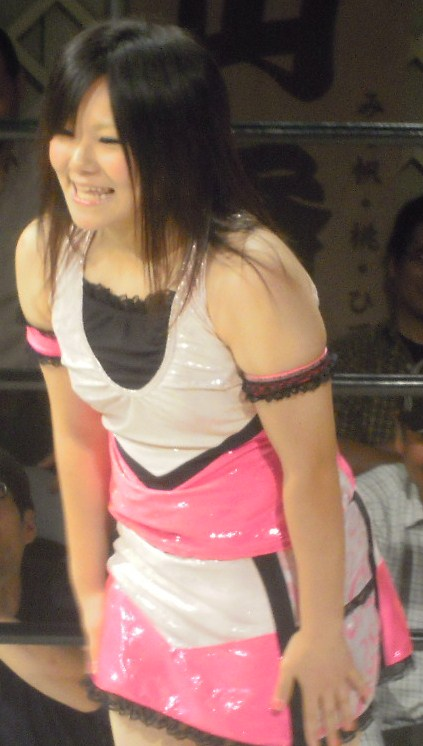
- Katsu in October 2011

Personal information
- Born: Manami Katsu; October 23, 1994 (age 32) Taitō, Tokyo

Professional wrestling career
- Ring name(s): Katsu Santa; Manami Haruyama; Manami Katsu
- Billed height: 1.60 m (5 ft 3 in)
- Billed weight: 67 kg (148 lb)
- Trained by: Azumi Hyuga; Command Bolshoi; Leon
- Debut: March 21, 2011

Manami Katsu (勝 愛実, Katsu Manami; born October 23, 1994) is a Japanese professional wrestler. She was trained by the JWP Joshi Puroresu promotion and made her debut in April 2011. In December 2011, Katsu won the Souseiseki Cup and a year later the JWP Junior and Princess of Pro-Wrestling Championships, which she held for 482 days. She has also worked for Ice Ribbon, Oz Academy, Reina X World and World Woman Pro-Wrestling Diana. Katsu retired from professional wrestling in July 2014, but made her return in April 2016.

== Professional wrestling career ==
=== JWP Joshi Puroresu (2011–2014, 2016–2017) ===
While still attending high school in Tokyo, Katsu began training professional wrestling at the dojo of the JWP Joshi Puroresu promotion. On January 20, 2011, she passed a traditional audition held in front of her trainers and JWP management and officially graduated to the main roster of the promotion, becoming its first ever member still in high school. Katsu made her debut on March 21, 2011, wrestling JWP Openweight Champion Leon to a draw in a five-minute "exhibition match". She made her "official" debut in Korakuen Hall on April 3, 2011, losing to Sendai Girls' Pro Wrestling representative Dash Chisako. On April 17, Katsu entered the J-1 Grand Prix 2011 and was defeated in her first round-robin match by masu-me. On May 22, she was defeated in her second match in the tournament by Sachie Abe. On June 12, Katsu was again defeated by masu-me, this time in a match to determine the number one contender to the JWP Junior and Princess of Pro-Wrestling Championships. Katsu won her first match on June 26, when she, Ebessan and Kaori Yoneyama defeated Gami, Kanjyuro Matsuyama and Kyusei Ninja Ranmaru, though she did not take part in the finish of the match. Katsu finally scored her first pinfall win on July 18, when she defeated freelancer Mika Iida in a singles match. On August 14, Katsu entered the annual Natsu Onna Kettei Tournament, but was eliminated in her first round match by Ice Ribbon representative Hikari Minami. On September 23, Katsu entered the Souseiseki Cup / Blue Star Cup round-robin tournament for rookies, defeating Ice Ribbon's Dorami Nagano in her first match. She followed that up by also defeating Aoi Yagami on October 10, Mexican wrestler Lady Afrodita on November 13, and masu-me on November 20. During the tournament, on October 16, Katsu also made her debut for Oz Academy, facing Nao Komatsu in a losing effort. On December 16, Katsu suffered her first loss in the tournament against Nana Kawasa, but still won her block to advance to the finals of the tournament. On December 23, Katsu defeated Rabbit Miu to win the 2011 Souseiseki Cup / Blue Star Cup tournament. The following day, Katsu was named JWP's rookie of the year. As a result of her tournament win, Katsu received a shot at the JWP Junior and Princess of Pro-Wrestling Championships on January 9, 2012, but was defeated by the defending champion, Osaka Joshi Pro Wrestling representative Sawako Shimono.

On February 3, Katsu entered the 2012 Tag League the Best tournament alongside Moon Mizuki, with the two being defeated by Command Bolshoi and Rabbit Miu in their first match. Nine days later, Katsu and Mizuki were also defeated in their second match by the Jumonji Sisters (Dash Chisako and Sendai Sachiko). Afterwards, Mizuki was sidelined with an injury, abruptly ending the team's run in the tournament. On March 3, Katsu made her debut for Ice Ribbon, taking part in the promotion's Teens project, spearheaded by Hikari Minami and Riho. In her debut match, Katsu and fellow JWP wrestlers Nana Kawasa and Rabbit Miu were defeated by Universal Woman's Pro Wrestling Reina representative Aoi Ishibashi, Sendai Girls' Pro Wrestling representative Kagetsu and Mika Iida. Seven days later, Katsu was defeated by Tsukasa Fujimoto in her Ice Ribbon main card debut. On March 27, Katsu also made her debut for World Woman Pro-Wrestling Diana, wrestling Sareee to a fifteen-minute time limit draw. In May, Katsu formed a new tag team with the returning Arisa Nakajima, adopting a new ring attire similar to Nakajima's. After defeating Leon and Rabbit Miu, and Nana Kawasa and Tsubasa Kuragaki in separate tag team matches, Katsu and Nakajima were granted a shot at the Daily Sports Women's Tag Team and JWP Tag Team Championships, but were defeated by the defending champions, Emi Sakura and Kaori Yoneyama, on June 17. Katsu and Nakajima also teamed together in the Reina X World promotion, losing to La Malcriada and Zeuxis in a main event on June 24 and defeating Micro and Puchi Tomato on July 7.

On November 4, Katsu pinned JWP Junior and Princess of Pro-Wrestling Champion Rabbit Miu in a tag team match, where she and Sareee faced Miu and Nana Kawasa. On December 2, Katsu again pinned Miu in a tag team match, where she and Kawasa faced Miu and Otera Pro representative Aki Shizuku, after which Miu agreed to defend her titles against her. Four days later, veteran Ran Yu-Yu made her final JWP appearance before her retirement and while doing so, handed Katsu two of her signature moves, a leg lariat and the Blockbuster, to use in the future. On December 24 at JWP's annual year-end Climax event, Katsu defeated Miu with the Blockbuster to become the new JWP Junior and Princess of Pro-Wrestling Champion, winning her first professional wrestling titles. Katsu opened her 2013 with a loss against Miu, when she was pinned in a tag team match on January 6, where she and Aki Shizuku faced Miu and Nana Kawasa. On January 13, Katsu entered a tournament in an attempt to earn the first shot at new JWP Openweight Champion, Arisa Nakajima. In her opening match, Katsu was victorious over Nana Kawasa. The following day, Katsu scored an upset victory over Morii in just seven seconds in her second round match, before being eliminated in the semifinals of the tournament by Leon. On January 27, Katsu was again pinned by Miu in a four-way, which also included Nana Kawasa and Rydeen Hagane, and, as a result, earned a spot in the 2013 Tag League the Best tournament. Immediately afterwards, Katsu defeated Kawasa and Hagane in a three-way match to become Miu's partner for the tournament. On February 10, Katsu wrestled her first match in her homeward of Taitō, when she reunited with Arisa Nakajima in a main event tag team match in Asakusa, where they were defeated by Command Bolshoi and Kayoko Haruyama. After losing to Dash Chisako and Sendai Sachiko in their opening match on February 17, Katsu and Miu finished their Tag League the Best tournament on March 31 with a win over Kazuki and Sachie Abe, failing to qualify for the finals. On April 14, Katsu made her first successful defense of the JWP Junior and Princess of Pro-Wrestling Championships against Ice Ribbon representative Risa Sera. On May 5, Katsu made her second successful title defense against another outsider, World Woman Pro-Wrestling Diana representative Sareee. Katsu continued her series of defenses against outsiders on August 18, when she defeated World Wonder Ring Stardom representative Eri Susa for her third successful title defense. Following the event, Katsu emerged as the first candidate to bring the Openweight Championship back to JWP from outsider and new champion, Kana. Katsu received her shot at JWP's top title on September 16, but was defeated by Kana. On October 17, Katsu took part in a big generational eight-on-eight elimination match promoted by Sendai Girls' Pro Wrestling, where she, Hikaru Shida, Kagetsu, Sareee, Syuri, Takumi Iroha, Yoshiko and Yuhi defeated Aja Kong, Command Bolshoi, Dump Matsumoto, Dynamite Kansai, Kyoko Inoue, Manami Toyota, Meiko Satomura and Takako Inoue. Katsu was eliminated from the match by Toyota.

In late 2013, Katsu began teaming regularly with veteran wrestler Kayoko Haruyama, effectively replacing her longtime tag team partner Tsubasa Kuragaki, who had left JWP to become a freelancer. On December 15 at Climax 2013, Katsu made her fourth successful defense of the JWP Junior and Princess of Pro-Wrestling Championships against Rydeen Hagane. From January 5 to March 16, 2014, Katsu and Haruyama, billed together as "Spring☆Victory" (a play on their family names; "haru" meaning spring and "katsu" victory), took part in the 2014 Tag League the Best. After two wins and one draw, the team won their round-robin block and advanced to the finals of the tournament. However, shortly afterwards Katsu injured her left ankle while training, forcing her and Haruyama to pull out of the final match. She returned from her injury on March 20. After a reign of 482 days, Katsu lost the JWP Junior and Princess of Pro-Wrestling Championships to Sareee in her fifth defense on April 20. Six days later, Katsu announced her retirement from professional wrestling with her final match taking place on July 13. On July 13, Katsu was defeated by Rabbit Miu in her retirement match.

On March 3, 2016, JWP announced that Katsu had rejoined the promotion on March 1 and would be wrestling her return match on April 3. On March 9, she wrestled Leon in a five-minute exhibition match, which ended in a draw. On April 3, Katsu was defeated by Rabbit Miu in her return match. Afterwards, Katsu and Miu came together to form a tag team named Ultimate☆Pureful. On July 17, Katsu unsuccessfully challenged Arisa Nakajima for the JWP Openweight Championship. On September 2, Katsu made her American debut when she took part in Chikara's 2016 King of Trios tournament, teaming with Command Bolshoi and Hanako Nakamori as Team JWP. They defeated the Snake Pit (Amasis, Argus and Ophidian) in their first-round match. The following day, Team JWP defeated United Nations (Juan Francisco de Coronado, Prakash Sabar and The Proletariat Boar of Moldova) to advance to the semifinals of the tournament. On September 4, Team JWP advanced to the finals of the tournament following a disqualification win over Hallowicked, Icarus and Jigsaw. Later that same day, Team JWP was defeated in the all-Japanese finals of the tournament by Team Sendai Girls (Cassandra Miyagi, Dash Chisako and Meiko Satomura).

On February 8, 2017, it was announced that JWP would be folding on April 2, after which all of its wrestlers, Katsu included, would become freelancers. At JWP's final show, Katsu was defeated by Mayumi Ozaki.

=== Pure-J (2017–present) ===
Before the official launch of Command Bolshoi's JWP follow-up promotion, Pure-J, on August 11, 2017, the former JWP roster, Katsu included, presented shows under the name "Pure-Dream Presents Dream Joshi Puroresu". At Pure-J's inaugural event on August 11, Katsu was defeated by freelancer Yumiko Hotta. At Pure-J year-ending Pure-J Climax 2017 event on December 17, Katsu unsuccessfully challenged Misaki Ohata for the Pro Wrestling Wave promotion's top title, the Wave Single Championship.

== Championships and accomplishments ==
- Ice Ribbon
  - ICE×∞ Championship (1 time)
  - International Ribbon Tag Team Championship (2 times, current) – with Misa Kagura (1) and Hikari Minami (1)
- JWP Joshi Puroresu
  - JWP Junior Championship (1 time)
  - Princess of Pro-Wrestling Championship (1 time)
  - Souseiseki Cup / Blue Star Cup (2011)
  - New Wave Award (2012, 2013)
  - Rookie of the Year Award (2011)
