= Hanako Nakamori =

Japanese professional wrestler

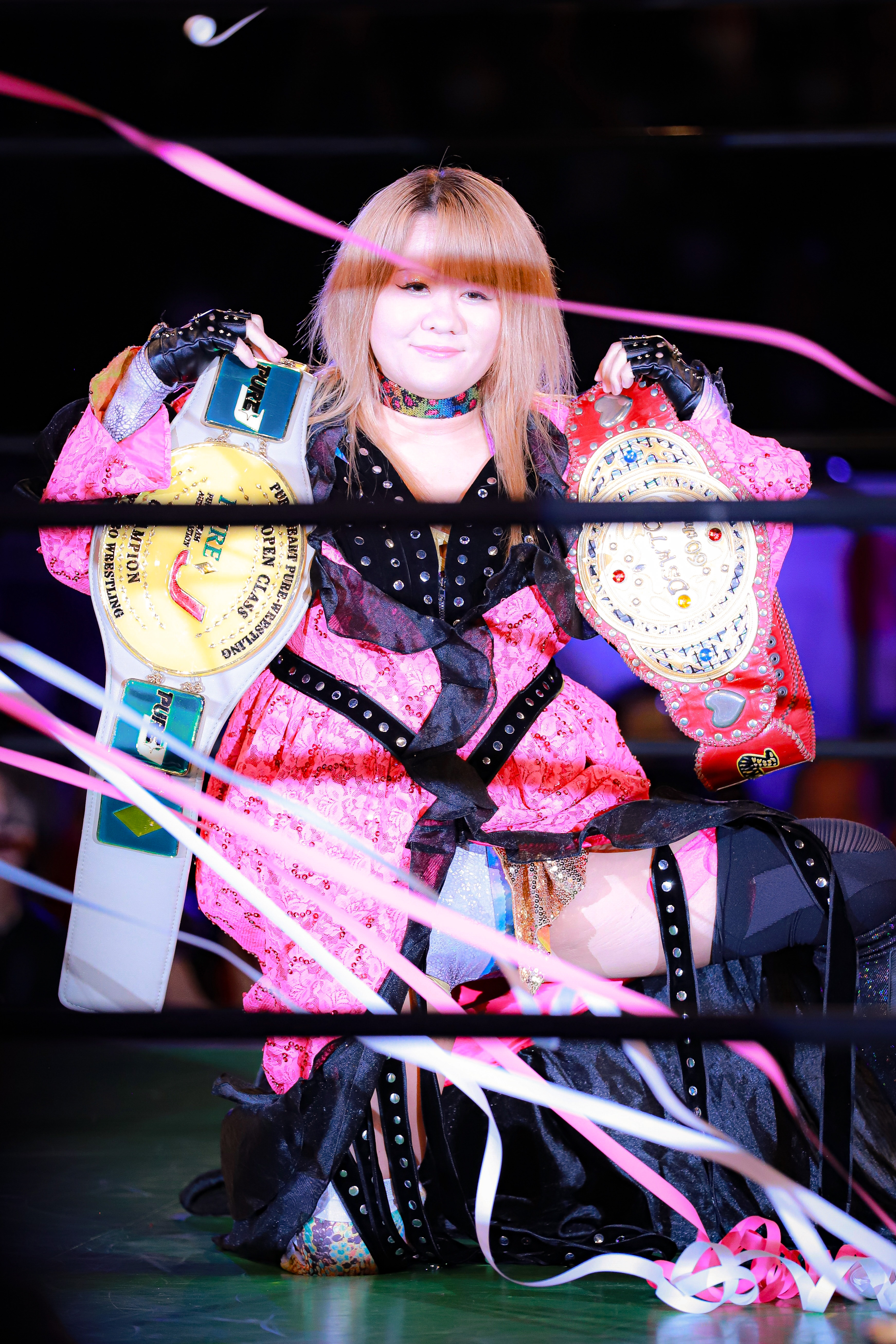
- Nakamori in June 2023

Personal information
- Born: December 1, 1988 (age 37) Kawasaki, Kanagawa, Japan

Professional wrestling career
- Ring name(s): Hanako Hanayashiki; Hanako Kobayashi; Hanako Nakamori
- Billed height: 158 cm (5 ft 2 in)
- Billed weight: 62 kg (137 lb)
- Trained by: Kaoru Ito; Leon
- Debut: 2006

Hanako Kobayashi (小林花子, Kobayashi Hanako), better known by her ring name Hanako Nakamori, is a Japanese professional wrestler currently working as a freelancer and is best known for her time in the Japanese promotions JWP Joshi Puroresu and Pure-J.

== Professional wrestling career ==
=== Independent circuit (2006–present) ===
Kobayashi made her professional wrestling debut at IBUKI 1st Anniversary, an event promoted by Ibuki Wrestling on July 16, 2006, where she fell short to Hiroyo Matsumoto.

As a freelancer, she is known for her tenures with various promotions. At New Ice Ribbon #706 ~ Live On Ring In SKIP City, an event promoted by Ice Ribbon on February 6, 2016, she teamed up with Yuuka in a losing effort to Lovely Butchers (Hamuko Hoshi and Mochi Miyagi). At Igarashi Shokai Halloween Festival 2017, an event promoted by Sendai Girls' Pro Wrestling on October 22, Kobayashi teamed up with Meiko Satomura and defeated Mika Shirahime and Yako Fujigasaki. At Hana Kimura Memorial Show from May 23, 2021, an event promoted by Kyoko Kimura to portrait one year from the passing of her daughter Hana, Kobayashi competed in a 28-person All-Star Battle Royal in which she faced notable opponents such as Cima, Masato Tanaka, Fuminori Abe, Menso-re Oyaji, Yuko Miyamoto and many others.

Suzuki also competed in men's promotions due to JWP and Pure-J having various partnerships around. At Tsurumi Ginza Shopping Street 60th Anniversary, an event promoted by Big Japan Pro Wrestling on August 9, 2014, she teamed up with Kazuki, picking up a victory over Command Bolshoi and Rabbit Miu. She participated in the 2016 edition of the King of Trios tournament promoted by Chikara where she teamed up with Command Bolshoi and Manami Katsu as Team JWP. They defeated The Snake Pit (Amasis, Argus and Ophidian) in the first-round, United Nations (Juan Francisco de Coronado, Prakash Sabar and The Proletariat Boar of Moldova) in the quarter-finals, The HeXed Men (Hallowicked, Icarus and Jigsaw) in the semi-finals but fell short to Sendai Girls (Cassandra Miyagi, Dash Chisako and Meiko Satomura) in the finals.

==== Gatoh Move Pro Wrestling (2012–2020) ====
A notable promotion in which Kobayashi fought is Gatoh Move Pro Wrestling. At Gatoh Move Japan Tour #83 ~ Happy New Year In Itabashi on January 4, 2014, she competed in a 20-man battle royal in which she faced the likes of Antonio Honda, DJ Nira, Emi Sakura, Guanchulo, Masa Takanashi and others. At Gatoh Move Japan Tour #105 ~ Golden Move 2014 Final Battle, an event promoted on May 3, 2014, she teamed up with Kazuhiro Tamura and went into a time-limit draw against Hikaru Sato and Riho.

==== JWP Joshi Puroresu (2006–2017) ====
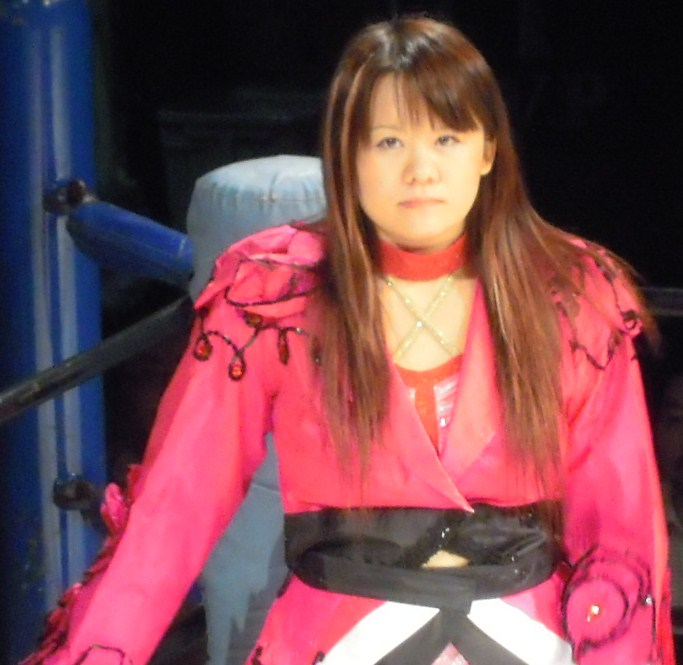
Nakamori in August 2010

Kobayashi is best known for being part of JWP Joshi Puroresu's roster form 2006 until the promotion's closure in 2017. She competed in the company's signature events such as Tag League the Best, making her first appearance at the 2011 edition of the event where she teamed up with Tomoko Morii as "Dog Lock Be", placing themselves in the "Red Zone" block, and scoring a total of two points after going against Harukura (Kayoko Haruyama and Tsubasa Kuragaki), Queens Revolution (Hailey Hatred and Kaori Yoneyama) and Hiroki (Sakura Hirota and Senri Kuroki). She scored her best result at the 2016 edition which was the last by teaming up with Makoto and winning the league by defeating Hikaru Shida and Yako Fujigasaki in the first-round, Kagetsu and Sawako Shimono in the semi-finals and Kazuki and Rydeen Hagane in the final.

As for the Natsu Onna Kettei Tournament, she made her first appearance at the 2010 edition under her real name where she fell short to Ayako Sato in a first-round match. She scored her best result at the 2010 and last ever edition of the event which she won by teaming up with Maki Narumiya and defeating Leon and Neko Nitta in the first-rounds, Rabbit Miu and Tsukasa Fujimoto in the semi-finals and Arisa Nakajima and Hikaru Shida in the final.

==== Pro Wrestling Wave (2007–2020) ====
Kobayashi had a tenure with Pro Wrestling Wave which lasted for more than a decade. She is known for competing in the promotion's signature events such as Catch the Wave, making her first appearance at the 2012 edition of the event where she placed herself in the "Black Dahlia" block, scoring a total of two points after competing against Yumi Ohka, Tsukasa Fujimoto, Cherry and Misaki Ohata. At the 2016 edition, she placed herself in the "Orion Blue" block which she won with a total of four points after defeating Misaki Ohata, Makoto and Yuka, but fell short to Yoshiko in the first round of play-offs.

==== Seadlinnng (2018–present) ====
Kobayashi made sporadic appearances for Seadlinnng. At SEAdLINNNG Go! Beyond! on November 1, 2018, she fell short to Arisa Nakajima in the semi-finals of a Beyond the Sea Single Championship tournament. At SEAdLINNNG Shin-Kiba NIGHT! on June 16, 2021, she teamed up with Las Fresa de Egoistas (Asuka, Ayame Sasamura, Makoto and Riko Kaiju) in a losing effort to Citrus Wind (Arisa Nakajima, Honori Hana, Nanae Takahashi, Riko Kawahata and Yumiko Hotta) as a result of an eight-woman tag team match.

== Championships and accomplishments ==
- JWP Joshi Puroresu
  - JWP Openweight Championship (1 time)
  - JWP Tag Team Championship (2 times) – with Kyoko Kimura (1) and Morii (1)
  - Tag League the Best (2016) – with Makoto
  - Natsu Onna Kettei Tournament (2012) – with Maki Narumiya
- Pro Wrestling Wave
  - Catch the Wave Award (1 time)
    - Best Bout Award (2022) vs. Hikari Shimizu on May 29
- Pure-J
  - Pure-J Openweight Championship (6 times, current)
  - Daily Sports Women's Tag Team Championship (6 times) – with Arisa Nakajima (1), Ayako Sato (1), Kyoko Kimura (1), Rina Yamashita (1), Tomoko Mori (1) and Kaho Kobayashi (1)
  - Pure-J Openweight Title League (2017)
  - Pure-J Year-End Award (6 times)
    - Best Bout Award (2017) vs. Dash Chisako on December 17
    - Best Bout Award (2018) vs. Arisa Nakajima on December 9
    - Best Bout Award (2019) vs. Leon on April 21
    - MVP Award (2017, 2018, 2019)
- World Woman Pro-Wrestling Diana
  - World Woman Pro-Wrestling Diana Tag Team Championship (3 times, current) – with Ayako Sato

== Luchas de Apuestas record ==
Winner (wager)	Loser (wager)	Location	Event	Date	Notes
Dash Chisako (championship and hair)	Hanako Nakamori (hair)	Tokyo, Japan	Pure-J Climax	December 17, 2017	
