= Tsubasa Kuragaki =

Japanese professional wrestler (born 1975)

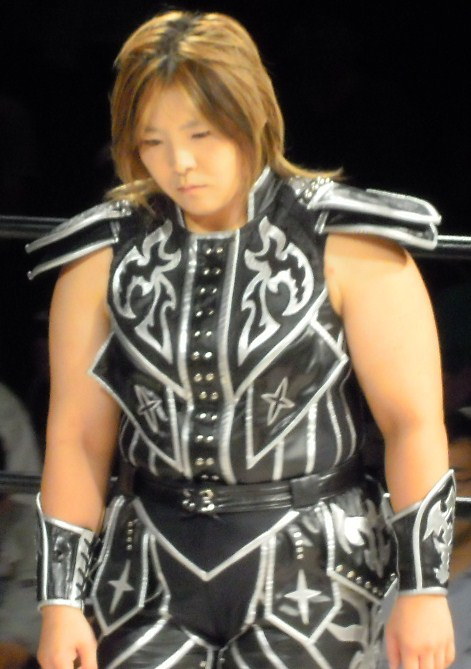
- Kuragaki in August 2010

Personal information
- Born: Yasuko Kuragaki; December 7, 1975 (age 50) Kamagaya, Chiba

Professional wrestling career
- Ring name(s): Kuragaki Santa; Tsubasa Haruyama; Tsubasa Kuragaki; Tsubasa Santa; Yasuko Kuragaki
- Billed height: 1.62 m (5 ft 4 in)
- Billed weight: 67 kg (148 lb)
- Debut: January 8, 1995

Yasuko Kuragaki (倉垣 靖子, Kuragaki Yasuko; born December 7, 1975) is a Japanese professional wrestler better known by the ring name Tsubasa Kuragaki (倉垣 翼, Kuragaki Tsubasa). For most of her career, Kuragaki has worked for JWP Joshi Puroresu, becoming a one-time JWP Junior and two-time JWP Openweight Champion as a singles wrestler. As a tag team wrestler, she is best known as one half of the "Harukura" tag team with Kayoko Haruyama, with whom she has held the Daily Sports Women's and JWP Tag Team Championships three times each. She quit JWP in October 2013 to become a freelancer. She is currently working most notably for Oz Academy, where she is a former one-time Oz Academy Openweight Champion and a one-time Oz Academy Tag Team Champion.

== Professional wrestling career ==
Kuragaki was trained in professional wrestling at the JWP Joshi Puroresu dojo, where she trained alongside the likes of Azumi Hyuga, Carlos Amano, Kana Misaki and Ran Yu-Yu. She made her debut under her real name on January 8, 1995, facing Tomomi Kobayashi at Korakuen Hall. However, Kuragaki ended up quitting JWP and retiring from professional wrestling later that same year. Kuragaki eventually returned to the ring and JWP on October 21, 1998, when she teamed with Kayoko Haruyama in a tag team match, where they faced Erika Watanabe and Tomiko Sai. Kuragaki quickly started a rivalry with Haruyama over the JWP Junior Championship and eventually won it from her in September 2000. Kuragaki remained with JWP for four years, before quitting the promotion and becoming a freelancer, adopting the ring name Tsubasa Kuragaki in the process. She, however, returned to the promotion in 2003 and in December 2004 won the JWP Tag Team Championship for the first time, teaming with Akino. The following September, Kuragaki defeated Azumi Hyuga to win JWP's top title, the JWP Openweight Championship for the first time. During 2005, Kuragaki also won NEO Japan Ladies Pro Wrestling's NEO Single and NWA Women's Pacific Championships.

Following her Openweight Championship reign, Kuragaki formed the Harukura tag team with Kayoko Haruyama, with the two becoming multi-time JWP Tag Team Champions and the first-ever Daily Sports Women's Tag Team Champions together during the next years. In early December 2011, Kuragaki made her American debut, when she took part in the three-day JoshiMania weekend, held by the Chikara promotion in Philadelphia, Pennsylvania. On December 23, 2011, Kuragaki defeated Hailey Hatred to regain the JWP Openweight Championship. After a four-month reign, she lost the title to Haruyama. In early 2012, Kuragaki began making regular appearances for the Oz Academy promotion, where she is one of the few wrestlers not representing any of the promotion's stables. Kuragaki returned to Chikara in September 2012 to take part in the 2012 King of Trios in Easton, Pennsylvania. Kuragaki, Command Bolshoi and Kaori Yoneyama, representing JWP, made it to the second round of the tournament, before being eliminated by F.I.S.T. (Chuck Taylor, Icarus and Johnny Gargano). In January 2013, Harukura started their third as both the Daily Sports Women's Tag Team and JWP Tag Team Champions with a win over the team of Arisa Nakajima and Command Bolshoi. After a seven-month reign, they lost the titles to Heart Move (Hanako Nakamori and Morii). On August 22, 2013, Kuragaki announced that she would be going freelance following October 14. Kuragaki was defeated by Haruyama in her final match as a JWP wrestler.

On August 10, 2014, Kuragaki made her debut for World Wonder Ring Stardom, teaming with Hatsuhinode Kamen and Kaori Yoneyama to defeat the Tawashis (Hiroyo Matsumoto, Mayu Iwatani and Miho Wakizawa) for the Artist of Stardom Championship. On October 13, Kuragaki defeated Akino to win the Oz Academy Openweight Championship for the first time. She lost the title back to Akino in her third defense on May 17, 2015. On September 13, Kuragaki returned to JWP, reforming her tag team with Haruyama, who had recently announced her retirement from professional wrestling. In October, Kuragaki and Haruyama made it to the finals of Pro Wrestling Wave's 2015 Dual Shock Wave tournament, contested for the Wave Tag Team Championship, but were defeated there by Ayako Hamada and Yuu Yamagata. On December 13, Kuragaki and Kaori Yoneyama defeated Kagetsu and Kaho Kobayashi to win the Oz Academy Tag Team Championship. On December 27, Kuragaki made another return to JWP to take part in her longtime tag team partner Kayoko Haruyama's retirement match, where Haruyama defeated Kuragaki. On September 11, 2016, Kuragaki and Yoneyama lost the Oz Academy Tag Team Championship to Hikaru Shida and Syuri. On April 2, 2017, Kuragaki returned to JWP to take part in the promotion's final event. In the main event, Kuragaki unsuccessfully challenged Hanako Nakamori for the JWP Openweight Championship in what marked the final match contested for the title.

== Championships and accomplishments ==
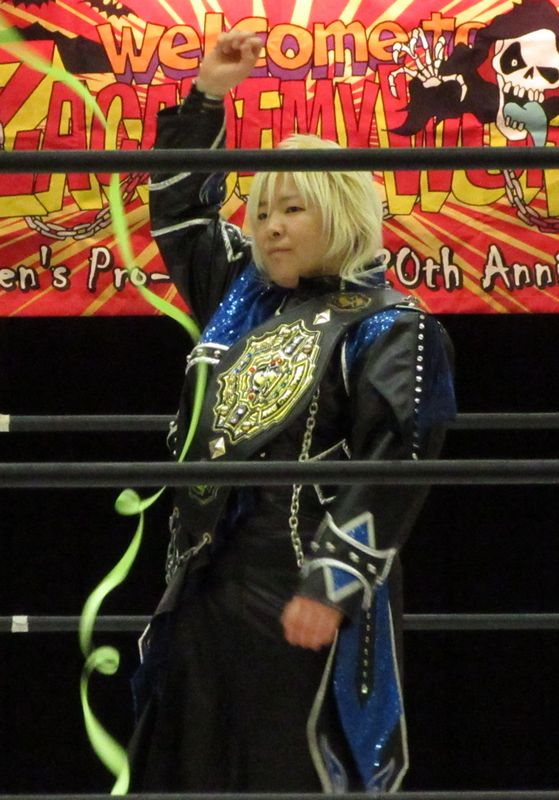
Kuragaki as one half of the Oz Academy Tag Team Champions in May 2016

- All Japan Women's Pro-Wrestling
  - AJW Tag Team Championship (1 time) – with Kana Misaki
- JWP Joshi Puroresu
  - Daily Sports Women's Tag Team Championship (3 times) – with Kayoko Haruyama
  - JWP Junior Championship (1 time)
  - JWP Openweight Championship (2 times)
  - JWP Tag Team Championship (4 times) – with Akino (1) and Kayoko Haruyama (3)
  - JWP Tag League the Best (2011) – with Kayoko Haruyama
  - Natsu Onna Kettei Tournament (2011)
  - JWP Year-End Award (4 times)
    - Best Bout Award (2007) with Kayoko Haruyama vs. Nanae Takahashi and Natsuki☆Taiyo on December 9
    - Fighting Spirit Award (2001)
    - MVP Award (2005)
    - Technique Award (2004)
- NEO Japan Ladies Pro-Wrestling
  - NEO Single Championship (1 time)
  - NWA Women's Pacific Championship (1 time)
- Osaka Pro Wrestling
  - Osaka Mixed Pancake Tournament (2002) – with Black Buffalo and Tsubasa
- Oz Academy
  - Oz Academy Openweight Championship (2 times)
  - Oz Academy Tag Team Championship (3 times) – with Itsuki Aoki (1), Kaori Yoneyama (1) and Kohaku (1)
  - Best Wizard Award (1 time)
    - Best Bout Award (2014) vs. Akino on October 13
- World Wonder Ring Stardom
  - Artist of Stardom Championship (1 time) – with Hatsuhinode Kamen and Kaori Yoneyama
