= Command Bolshoi =

Japanese professional wrestler

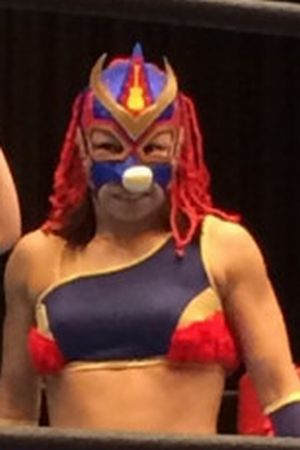
- Bolshoi in April 2014

Personal information
- Born: Osaka, Osaka

Professional wrestling career
- Ring name(s): Bolshoi 666; Bolshoi Kid; Bolshoi Santa; Bolshoi Yoneyama; Command Bolshoi; Command Yoneshoi; Douton Bolshoi; Hawaiian Bolshoi; Miko-san; Piko; Queen Bolshoi; T-1 Mask; Western Bolshoi
- Billed height: 1.47 m (4 ft 10 in)
- Billed weight: 48 kg (106 lb)
- Debut: November 26, 1991
- Retired: April 21, 2019

Command Bolshoi (コマンド・ボリショイ, Komando Borishoi) is a retired Japanese professional wrestler. She debuted for Japan Women's Pro-Wrestling (JWP) in November 1991 and worked for its follow-up promotion JWP Joshi Puroresu from 1992 until its folding in 2017, also serving as its final president. During her years in JWP, Bolshoi became a two-time JWP Openweight Champion, seven-time JWP Tag Team Champion and a four-time Daily Sports Women's Tag Team Champion. Bolshoi has worked under mask for a majority of her career and has managed to keep her real name and birthdate secret.

== Professional wrestling career ==
=== JWP Joshi Puroresu (1991–2017) ===
After spending two years training at the JWP Dojo, Bolshoi made her professional wrestling debut for the Japan Women's Pro-Wrestling (JWP) promotion on November 26, 1991, teaming with Mami Kitamura in a tag team match, where the two faced Hikari Fukuoka and Reiko Hoshino. Originally she worked under a clown mask and the ring name "Bolshoi Kid", named after the Russian Bolshoi Circus. The following year, after the original JWP folded, she began working for its follow-up promotion, JWP Joshi Puroresu, reinventing herself as "Command Bolshoi" in the process, though still disguising herself under a mask. To this day, she continues to occasionally work under her Bolshoi Kid persona. After Cutie Suzuki, Devil Masami, Dynamite Kansai and Mayumi Ozaki all quit JWP, Bolshoi became the promotion's new president, while also becoming a trainer at the promotion's dojo. Bolshoi won her first title in JWP in 1999, when she and Rieko Amano won the JWP Tag Team Championship. The following year on August 6, Bolshoi defeated Ran Yu-Yu to win JWP's top title, the JWP Openweight Championship. After a seven-month reign, she lost the title to Azumi Hyuga. During the next year, Bolshoi went on to win the JWP Tag Team Championship two more times with Azumi Hyuga and Gami. From July 2002 to April 2009, Bolshoi went completely without any titles, before she and Megumi Yabushita defeated Keito and Yumiko Hotta for not only the JWP Tag Team Championship, but also the Daily Sports Women's Tag Team Championship.

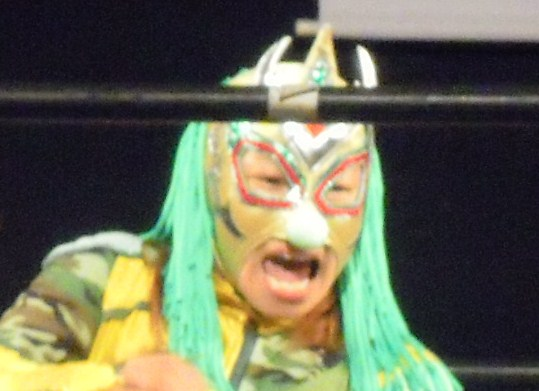
Bolshoi in June 2010

In 2010, Bolshoi made several appearances for the Ice Ribbon promotion, defeating Hikari Minami on August 27 to win the promotion's top title, the ICE×60 Championship. After a four-month reign, she lost the title to Tsukasa Fujimoto on December 26. In December 2011, Bolshoi was scheduled to make her American debut with the Chikara promotion, but was forced to pull out at the last minute due to an injury. She eventually made her debut for the promotion the following September, when she, Kaori Yoneyama and Tsubasa Kuragaki made it to the second round of the 2012 King of Trios. Bolshoi's 2012 was highlighted by her and JWP's storyline rivalry with the Heart Move Kei Reform (HMK) stable, which led to her and Arisa Nakajima winning the Daily Sports Women's Tag Team and JWP Tag Team Championships from HMK members Emi Sakura and Kaori Yoneyama in August 2012. Bolshoi's part in the rivalry culminated at the end of the year event on December 24, where Bolshoi defeated Yoneyama in a grudge match.

In June 2013, Bolshoi announced the "Bolshoi Decade" series, where she would face all other JWP wrestlers in singles matches in order to assess their abilities. As part of the series, Bolshoi defeated Leon on July 20 to win the CMLL-Reina International Championship. After a reign of only eight days, Bolshoi lost the title to Arisa Nakajima in the next match in the Bolshoi Decade series; a double title match, contested also for the JWP Openweight Championship. On May 4, 2014, Bolshoi and Kyoko Kimura defeated Rabbit Miu and Tsukushi in a decision match to become the new Daily Sports Women's Tag Team and JWP Tag Team Champions. They held the titles for the rest of the year, losing them to Leon and Ray on December 28, 2014. On July 11, 2015, Bolshoi defeated Kayoko Haruyama to win the JWP Openweight Championship for the second time, fifteen years after winning it the first time. She lost the title to Mayumi Ozaki in her first defense on August 16.

In September 2016, Bolshoi returned to the United States and Chikara to represent JWP in the 2016 King of Trios, alongside Hanako Nakamori and Manami Katsu. The team made it to the finals of the tournament before losing to their compatriots, Team Sendai Girls (Cassandra Miyagi, Dash Chisako and Meiko Satomura). On January 9, 2017, Bolshoi and Leon defeated Hanako Nakamori and Kyoko Kimura to win the Daily Sports Women's Tag Team and JWP Tag Team Championships. On February 8, it was announced that JWP would be folding on April 2, after which Bolshoi is scheduled to launch a new promotion on August 11. The following month, it was announced that the new promotion would be called "Pure-J". At JWP's final show on April 2, 2017, Bolshoi and Leon successfully defended the Daily Sports Women's Tag Team and JWP Tag Team Championships against Kazuki and Rydeen Hagane. Afterwards, the JWP title was retired, while the Daily Sports title moves on to Pure-J with the champions.

=== Pure-J (2017–2019) ===
Before the official launch of Pure-J on August 11, 2017, the former JWP roster presented shows under the name "Pure-Dream Presents Dream Joshi Puroresu". Bolshoi and Leon continued defending the Daily Sports Women's Tag Team Championship at these shows. During these shows, the two also named their team "P-Ray-L", in reference to Ray, who was battling cancer. The name, which includes the letters "P" and "L" for "Piko" and "Leon", was also a play on the word "prayer". At Pure-J's inaugural event on August 11, Bolshoi defeated Konami.

On August 21, 2018, Bolshoi announced that due to the progressive worsening of the yellow ligament ossification in her spine, that she would be retiring in 2019, with her retirement show set at Korakuen Hall on April 21.

== Bodybuilding ==
On May 31, 2015, Bolshoi took part in NPCJ's Blaze Open bodybuilding competition, where she finished third in the women's athlete category, beating fellow professional wrestler Meiko Satomura, who finished fourth. Bolshoi, however, won the Overall Best Performance Award, which was voted by 50 randomly picked members of the audience. On October 24, 2015, Bolshoi won the NPCJ Beef Sasaki Classic's figure category and was also chosen as the tournament's MVP across all categories.

== Championships and accomplishments ==
- Ice Ribbon
  - ICE×60 Championship (1 time)
- JWP Joshi Puroresu
  - Daily Sports Women's Tag Team Championship (4 times) – with Megumi Yabushita (1), Arisa Nakajima (1), Kyoko Kimura (1) and Leon (1)
  - JWP Openweight Championship (2 times)
  - JWP Tag Team Championship (7 times) – with Arisa Nakajima (1), Azumi Hyuga (1), Gami (1), Kyoko Kimura (1), Leon (1), Megumi Yabushita (1) and Rieko Amano/Carlos Amano (1)
  - Natsu Onna Kettei Tag Tournament (2010) – with Kaori Yoneyama
  - JWP Year End-Award (7 times)
    - Best Bout Award (2001) vs. Azumi Hyuga on November 21
    - Best Bout Award (2003) with Erika Watanabe and Kayoko Haruyama vs. Azumi Hyuga, Kyoko Kimura and Yuki Miyazaki on August 16
    - Best Bout Award (2012) with Arisa Nakajima vs. Emi Sakura and Kaori Yoneyama on August 19
    - JWP Award (2005)
    - Special Award (2002, 2007, 2012)
- Pure-J
  - Pure-J Openweight Championship (1 time)
  - Pure-J Year-End Award (2 times)
    - Special Award (2018)
    - Special Achievement Award (2019)
- Reina Joshi Puroresu
  - CMLL-Reina International Championship (1 time)
- Sendai Girls' Pro Wrestling
  - Sendai Girls Junior Championship (1 time)
- Other accomplishments
  - Organization Representative One Night Tournament (2010)
