= Kayoko Haruyama =

Japanese professional wrestler

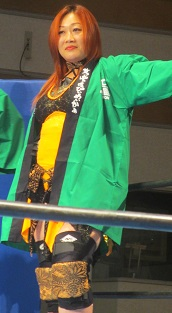
- Haruyama in September 2015

Personal information
- Born: March 5, 1979 (age 47) Fukuoka, Fukuoka, Japan

Professional wrestling career
- Ring name(s): Haruyama Santa; Kanton Ban Yuki Miyazaki; Kayoko Haruyama; Kayoko Santa; Taisou Gi Chakuyou Shi Ta Kayoko Haruyama; Tsubasa Kuragaki
- Billed height: 1.60 m (5 ft 3 in)
- Billed weight: 77 kg (170 lb)
- Debut: January 23, 1998
- Retired: December 27, 2015

Kayoko Haruyama (春山 香代子, Haruyama Kayoko; born March 5, 1979) is a retired Japanese professional wrestler. Having made her debut in January 1998, Haruyama worked for the JWP Joshi Puroresu promotion her entire career, becoming not only one of the promotion's most accomplished singles wrestlers, with one JWP Junior Championship reign and three JWP Openweight Championship reigns behind her, but also a three-time Daily Sports Women's Tag Team Champion and a five-time JWP Tag Team Champion, most notably teaming with Tsubasa Kuragaki as the tag team "Harukura". Haruyama's accomplishments outside of JWP include reigns as the AJW Champion and AJW Tag Team Champion and winning the 2006 Neo Japan Cup. She ended her 18-year career in December 2015.

== Professional wrestling career ==
=== JWP Joshi Puroresu (1998–2015) ===
Haruyama made her professional wrestling debut for the JWP Joshi Puroresu promotion on January 23, 1998, facing Erika Watanabe at Korakuen Hall. Later that year, Haruyama won the Souseiseki Cup, JWP's tournament for rookies. Haruyama followed that up by winning another tournament the following year to become the new JWP Junior Champion. After graduating from the junior division, Haruyama became one of JWP's top wrestlers, winning back-to-back MVP Awards in 2003 and 2004 and culminating in April 2008, when she defeated Azumi Hyuga to win JWP's top title, the JWP Openweight Championship for the first time. Haruyama held the title for two years, making successful defenses against the likes of Kaori Yoneyama, Kyoko Kimura, Leon, Ran Yu-Yu and Yumiko Hotta, resulting in her winning yet another MVP Award 2008. Her reign ended in April 2010, when she lost the title to Nanae Takahashi in her ninth defense.

Meanwhile, Haruyama also excelled in tag team wrestling. After JWP Tag Team Championship reigns with Azumi Hyuga and Kaori Yoneyama, she formed the tag team "Harukura" with former junior division rival Tsubasa Kuragaki. The two won their first JWP Tag Team Championship in August 2007 and during their fourteen-month reign, unified the title with the new Daily Sports Women's Tag Team Championship in August 2008. Harukura held the titles for another eleven-month reign from December 2010 to November 2011. In April 2012, Haruyama regained the JWP Openweight Championship from her tag team partner Tsubasa Kuragaki and held it for six months, before losing it to Emi Sakura. In January 2013, Harukura started their third reign as both the Daily Sports Women's Tag Team and JWP Tag Team Champions with a win over the team of Arisa Nakajima and Command Bolshoi. After a seven-month reign, they lost the titles to Heart Move (Hanako Nakamori and Morii). On October 14, 2013, Haruyama defeated Kuragaki, who was making her final appearance for JWP, before her resignation from the promotion. After a short-lived partnership with Manami Katsu, Haruyama found a new partner in Ice Ribbon wrestler Aoi Kizuki, with whom she won the 2015 Tag League the Best.

On April 5, 2015, Haruyama defeated Arisa Nakajima to capture the JWP Openweight Championship for the third time. She lost the title to Command Bolshoi on July 11. Following the loss, Haruyama announced she would retire from professional wrestling on December 27. As part of her road to retirement, Haruyama reunited with the now freelancer Tsubasa Kuragaki, but the two failed to capture the Daily Sports Women's Tag Team and JWP Tag Team Championships on September 22. In October, Haruyama and Kuragaki made it to the finals of Pro Wrestling Wave's 2015 Dual Shock Wave tournament, contested for the Wave Tag Team Championship, but were defeated there by Ayako Hamada and Yuu Yamagata. On December 27, Haruyama wrestled twice during her retirement event, first teaming with Tsubasa Kuragaki to defeat Command Bolshoi and Kaori Yoneyama in Harukura's final match together as a tag team and then defeating Kuragaki in the final match of her 18-year career.

== Championships and accomplishments ==
- All Japan Women's Pro-Wrestling
  - AJW Championship (1 time)
  - AJW Tag Team Championship (1 time) – with Kaori Yoneyama
- Chick Fights Sun
  - Chick Fever J (2007)
- Ice Ribbon
  - International Ribbon Tag Team Championship (1 time) – with Aoi Kizuki
- JWP Joshi Puroresu
  - Daily Sports Women's Tag Team Championship (3 times) – with Tsubasa Kuragaki
  - JWP Junior Championship (1 time)
  - JWP Openweight Championship (3 times)
  - JWP Tag Team Championship (5 times) – with Azumi Hyuga (1), Kaori Yoneyama (1) and Tsubasa Kuragaki (3)
  - JWP Junior Championship Tournament (1999)
  - JWP Openweight Championship Next Challenger Determination League (2008)
  - JWP Openweight Champion Next Challenger Determination 2Day Tournament (2013)
  - JWP Tag League the Best (2011) – with Tsubasa Kuragaki
  - JWP Tag League the Best (2015) – with Aoi Kizuki
  - Blue Star Cup (1998)
  - JWP Year End-Award (12 times)
    - Best Bout Award (2003) with Command Bolshoi and Erika Watanabe vs. Azumi Hyuga, Kyoko Kimura and Yuki Miyazaki on August 16
    - Best Bout Award (2004) vs. Azumi Hyuga on November 28
    - Best Bout Award (2007) with Tsubasa Kuragaki vs. Nanae Takahashi and Natsuki☆Taiyo on December 9
    - Best Bout Award (2008) vs. Yumiko Hotta on September 23
    - Best Bout Award (2009) vs. Azumi Hyuga on April 12
    - Best Bout Award (2015) vs. Arisa Nakajima on December 23
    - Fighting Spirit Award (2001–2002)
    - MVP Award (2003–2004, 2008, 2015)
- NEO Japan Ladies Pro Wrestling
  - Neo Japan Cup (2006)
