= JWP Openweight Championship =

Professional wrestling women's championship

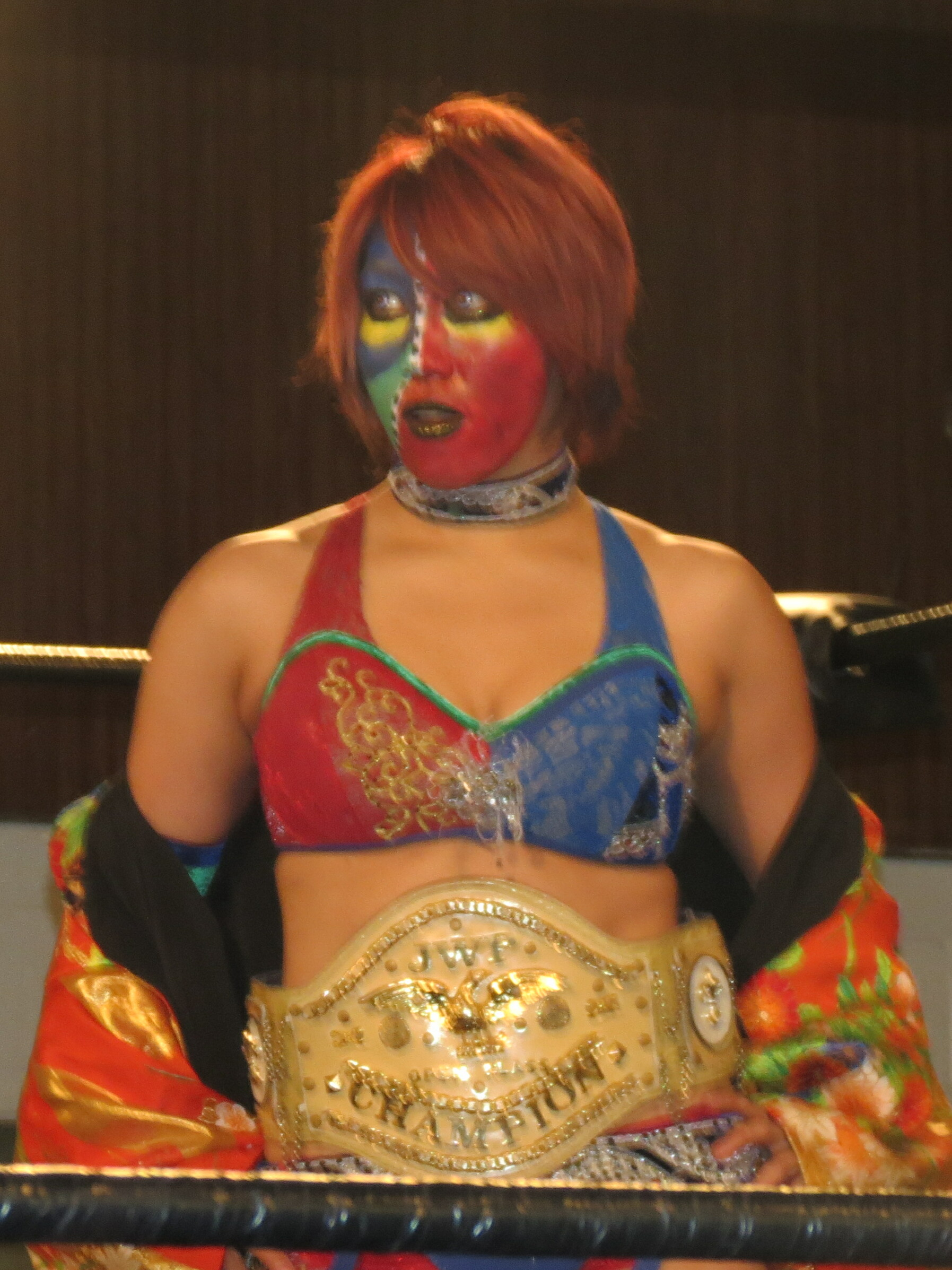
- KANA as the JWP Openweight Champion in 2013

Details
- Promotion: JWP Joshi Puroresu
- Date established: December 2, 1992
- Date retired: April 2, 2017
Statistics
- First champion: Dynamite Kansai
- Most reigns: Arisa Nakajima and Azumi Hyuga (4 reigns)
- Longest reign: Kayoko Haruyama (1st reign, 719 days)
- Shortest reign: Kyoko Kimura (25 days)
- Oldest champion: Mayumi Ozaki (46 years, 292 days) (Note: The date of birth of Command Bolshoi is unknown, therefore, this stat might be inaccurate.)
- Youngest champion: Dynamite Kansai (22 years, 363 days)

The JWP Openweight Championship was a women's professional wrestling championship owned by the JWP Joshi Puroresu promotion. The championship, which was situated at the top of JWP's championship hierarchy, was introduced on December 2, 1992, when Dynamite Kansai defeated Cutie Suzuki in a tournament final to become the inaugural champion. At the time of JWP Joshi Puroresu's folding in April 2017, the JWP Openweight Championship was the oldest active title in all of joshi puroresu.

Like most professional wrestling championships, the title was won as a result of a scripted match. There were thirty reigns shared among nineteen different wrestlers. The title was retired on April 2, 2017, when JWP Joshi Puroresu went out of business. That same day, Hanako Nakamori won the final match contested for the title, making her third successful defense against Tsubasa Kuragaki.

== Title history ==
On December 2, 1992, Dynamite Kansai became the inaugural JWP Openweight Champion by defeating Cutie Suzuki. On October 15, 1995, Kansai would defeated Suzuki once again to win the title, which was previously vacated. On November 28, 2004, after the championship was vacated once again, Azumi Hyuga won it by defeating Kayoko Haruyama in a tournament final. On September 19, 2010, at JWP Revolution, the 15th champion Kaori Yoneyama successfully defended her title against Emi Sakura in a Hair vs. Hair match, forcing Sakura being shaved bald. Sakura would later win the championship on October 28, 2012, after defeating Kayoko Haruyama.

On April 2, 2017, at JWP's 25th Anniversary show, which was JWP's last show as JWP closed doors, the championship was deactivated with Hanako Nakamori being the last champion, with a final successful title defense against Tsubasa Kuragaki.

== Reigns ==
Over the championship's 24-year history, there have been 30 reigns between 19 champions and two vacancies. Dynamite Kansai was the inaugural champion, while Hanako Nakamori being the last. Arisa Nakajima and Azumi Hyuga share the record for most reigns at four. Kayoko Haruyama's first reign is the longest at 719 days, while Kyoko Kimura's reign is the shortest at 25 days. Mayumi Ozaki is the oldest champion at 46 years old, while Kansai is the youngest at 22 years old.

Key
No.	Overall reign number
Reign	Reign number for the specific champion
Days	Number of days held
Defenses	Number of successful defenses

No.	Champion	Championship change			Reign statistics			Notes	Ref.
No.	Champion	Date	Event	Location	Reign	Days	Defenses	Notes	Ref.
1	Dynamite Kansai	December 2, 1992	House show	Tokyo, Japan	1	655	3	Defeated Cutie Suzuki in a tournament final to become the inaugural champion.	
2	Devil Masami	September 18, 1994	House show	Yokohama, Japan	1	32	1		
—	Vacated	October 20, 1994	—	—	—	—	—	The championship was vacated due to undocumented reasons.	
3	Dynamite Kansai	October 15, 1995	House show	Tokyo, Japan	2	541	2	Defeated Cutie Suzuki in a tournament final to win the vacant championship.	
4	Hikari Fukuoka	April 8, 1997	House show	Tokyo, Japan	1	691	6		
5	Azumi Hyuga	February 28, 1999	House show	Tokyo, Japan	1	298	3		
6	Ran Yu-Yu	December 23, 1999	House show	Tokyo, Japan	1	525	1		
7	Command Bolshoi	August 6, 2000	House show	Tokyo, Japan	1	196	0		
8	Azumi Hyuga	February 18, 2001	House show	Tokyo, Japan	2	623	5		
—	Vacated	November 3, 2002	—	—	—	—	—	The championship was vacated due to undocumented reasons.	
9	Azumi Hyuga	November 28, 2004	House show	Tokyo, Japan	3	294	2	Defeated Kayoko Haruyama in a tournament final to win the vacant championship.	
10	Tsubasa Kuragaki	September 18, 2005	House show	Tokyo, Japan	1	252	1		
11	Manami Toyota	May 28, 2006	Mania–X	Tokyo, Japan	1	113	3		
12	Azumi Hyuga	September 18, 2006	House show	Tokyo, Japan	4	589	5		
13	Kayoko Haruyama	April 29, 2008	Mania–X	Tokyo, Japan	1	719	8		
14	Nanae Takahashi	April 18, 2010	House show	Tokyo, Japan	1	91	2		
15	Kaori Yoneyama	July 18, 2010	JWP–Pure–Slam	Tokyo, Japan	1	259	10		
16	Leon	April 3, 2011	Mania–X	Tokyo, Japan	1	84	1	This match was also contested for the High Speed Championship.	
17	Hailey Hatred	June 25, 2011	Road to JWP 20th: Osaka Carnival	Osaka, Japan	1	180	3	This match was also contested for the TLW World Women's and IMW Hybrid Fighting Championships.	
18	Tsubasa Kuragaki	December 23, 2011	Climax 2011: Kaori Yoneyama Final	Tokyo, Japan	2	121	0		
19	Kayoko Haruyama	April 22, 2012	JWP 20th Anniversary: Mania–X	Tokyo, Japan	2	189	3		
20	Emi Sakura	October 28, 2012	Pure Wars Series	Tokyo, Japan	1	57	1		
21	Arisa Nakajima	December 24, 2012	Climax 2012: JWP 20th	Tokyo, Japan	1	237	3		
22	Kana	August 18, 2013	JWP–Pure Slam 2013	Tokyo, Japan	1	119	2		
23	Arisa Nakajima	December 15, 2013	Climax	Tokyo, Japan	2	476	6		
24	Kayoko Haruyama	April 5, 2015	Mania–X	Tokyo, Japan	3	97	1		
25	Command Bolshoi	July 11, 2015	Tropical☆Bari Bari Hurricane	Tokyo, Japan	2	36	0		
26	Mayumi Ozaki	August 16, 2015	JWP–Pure Plum 2015	Tokyo, Japan	1	231	2		
27	Arisa Nakajima	April 3, 2016	Mania–X	Tokyo, Japan	3	189	2		
28	Kyoko Kimura	October 9, 2016	Fly High in the 25th Anniversary	Tokyo, Japan	1	25	2		
29	Arisa Nakajima	November 3, 2016	Pure Dream 2016	Tokyo, Japan	4	55	0	This was a Street Fight.	
30	Hanako Nakamori	December 28, 2016	Climax	Tokyo, Japan	1	95	3		
—	Deactivated	April 2, 2017	JWP 25th Anniversary	Tokyo, Japan	—	—	—	The championship was retired when JWP Joshi Puroresu goes out of business.	

== Combined reigns ==
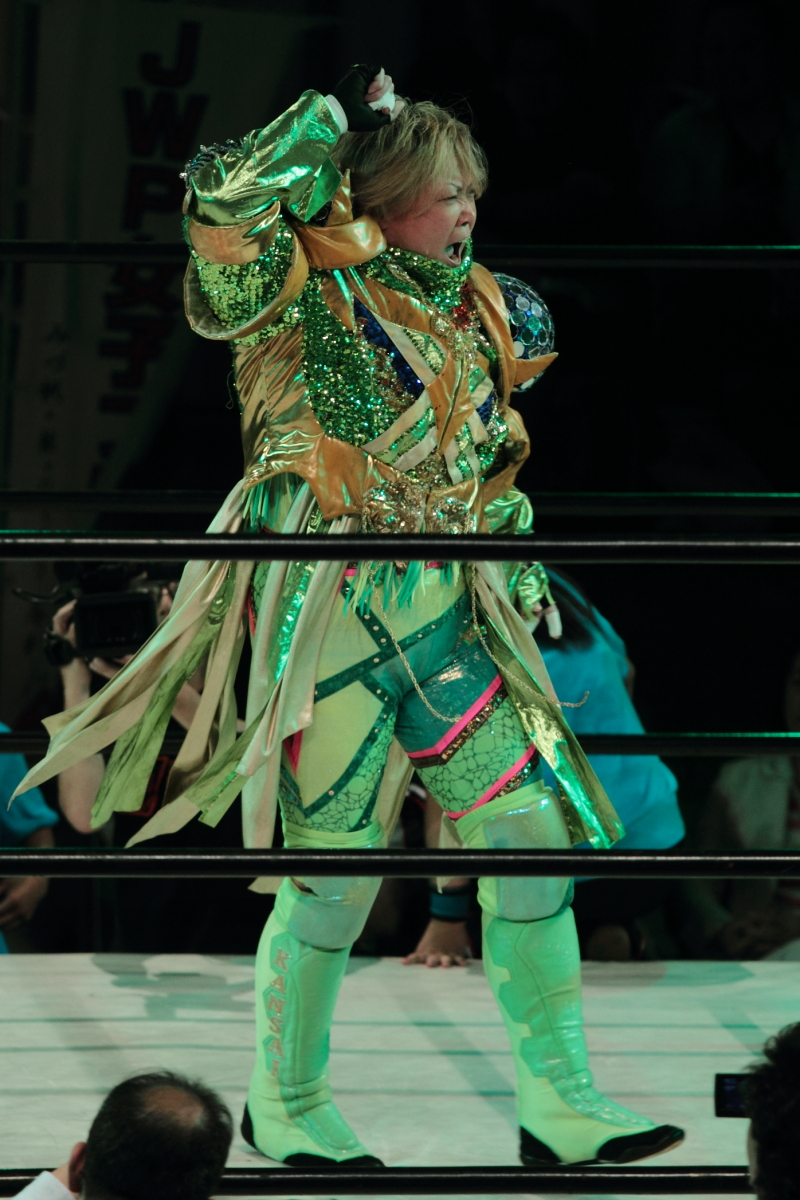
Two-time and inaugural champion Dynamite Kansai

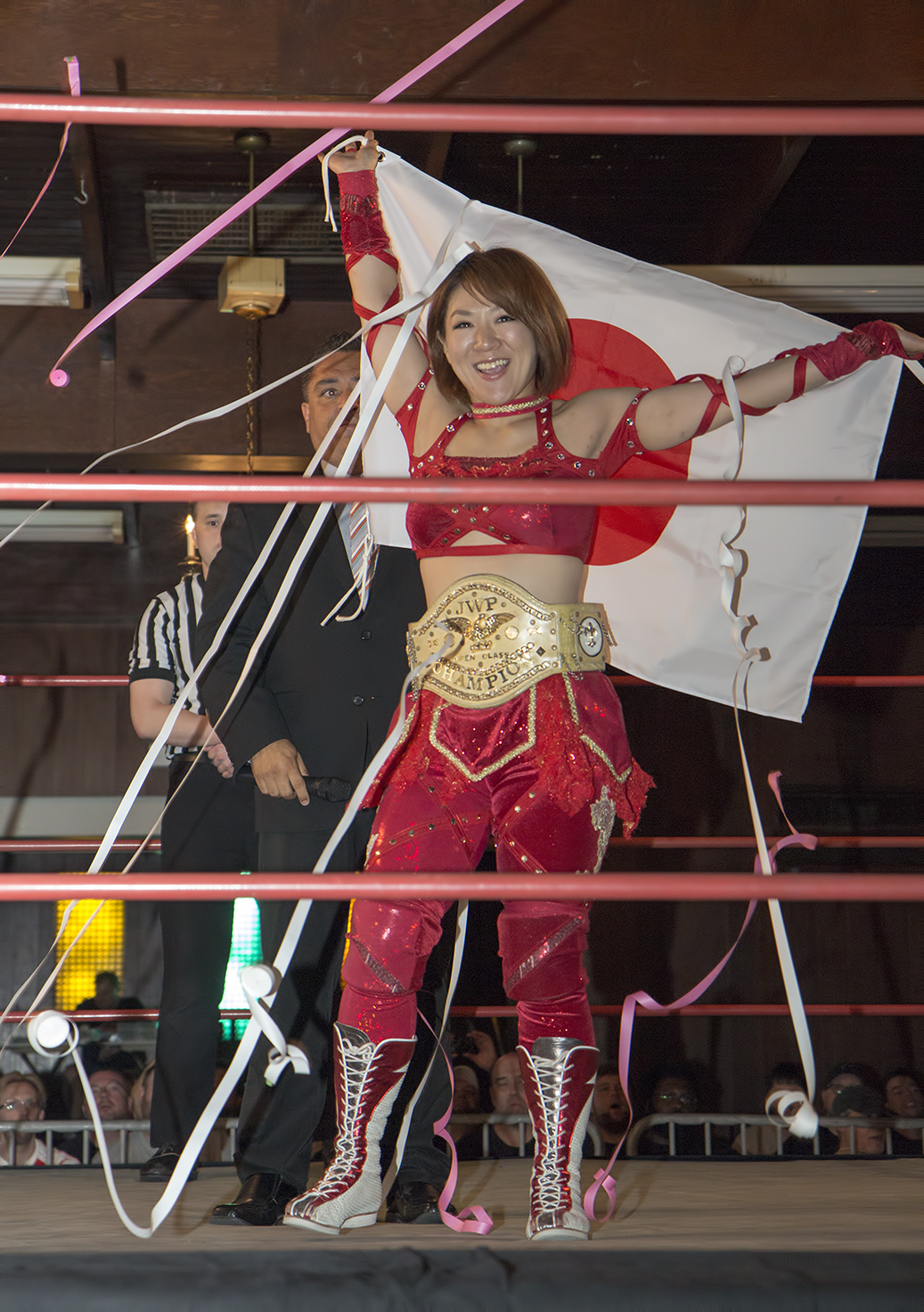
Arisa Nakajima has held the title a record-equalling four times.

Rank	Wrestler	No. of reigns	Combined defenses	Combined days
1	Azumi Hyuga	4	14	1,797
2	Dynamite Kansai	2	5	1,197
3	Kayoko Haruyama	3	12	1,005
4	Arisa Nakajima	4	11	957
5	Hikari Fukuoka	1	6	691
6	Ran Yu-Yu	1	1	525
7	Tsubasa Kuragaki	2	1	373
8	Kaori Yoneyama	1	10	259
9	Command Bolshoi	2	0	232
10	Mayumi Ozaki	1	2	231
11	Hailey Hatred	1	3	180
12	Kana	1	2	119
13	Manami Toyota	1	3	113
14	Hanako Nakamori	1	3	95
15	Nanae Takahashi	1	2	91
16	Leon	1	1	84
17	Emi Sakura	1	1	57
18	Devil Masami	1	1	32
19	Kyoko Kimura	1	2	25
