= Rabbit Miu =

Japanese professional wrestler

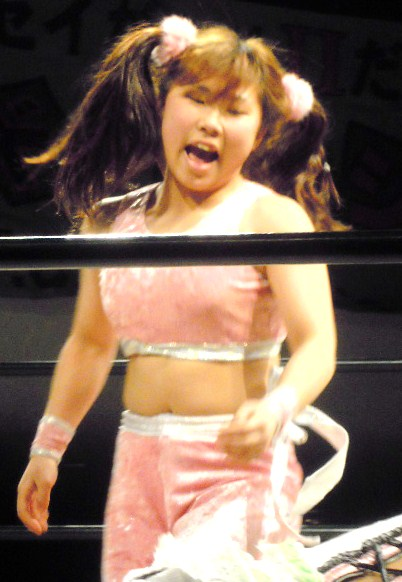
- Miu in February 2012

Personal information
- Born: February 22, 1996 (age 30) Yokohama, Japan

Professional wrestling career
- Ring name(s): Miyuki Shiota; Rabbit Haruyama; Rabbit Miyu; Rabbit Miu; Rabbit Yoneyama
- Billed height: 139 cm (4 ft 7 in)
- Billed weight: 43 kg (95 lb)
- Trained by: Kaori Yoneyama
- Debut: 2011
- Retired: 2016

Miyuki Shiota (塩田みゆき, Shiota Miyuki) better known by her ring name Rabbit Miu is a Japanese retired professional wrestler best known for her tenure with the Japanese promotion Pure-J, and Ice Ribbon.

== Professional wrestling career ==
=== Independent circuit (2011–2016) ===
Shiota is known for competing in various promotions from the Japanese independent scene. She competed in memorial events such as the Nagaharu Imai Memorial Show from October 1, 2013, where she competed in a 12-person battle royal won by Kyusei Ninja Ranmaru and also involving Ayako Hamada, Dash Chisako, Emi Sakura, Mariko Yoshida, Takako Inoue, Shinobu Kandori and others. At a house show promoted by Sendai Girls' Pro Wrestling on April 16, 2016, she fell short to Meiko Satomura in singles competition. At Pro Wrestling Wave's 2016 edition of the Catch the Wave tournament, Shiota placed herself in the "Pompadour Pink" block where she scored a total of three points after competing against Tsukasa Fujimoto, Moeka Haruhi and Cherry. At Dynamite Kansai's 30th Anniversary Show, an event promoted by Oz Academy on May 22, 2016, she teamed up with Aja Kong in a losing effort against Mission K4 (Kaho Kobayashi and Sonoko Kato).

=== Ice Ribbon (2011–2016) ===
Another promotion in which Shiota competed in was Ice Ribbon.At Ice Ribbon New Ice Ribbon #589 on September 15, 2014, she teamed up with tsukushi to unsuccessfully challenge STAP (Maki Narumiya and Risa Sera) for the International Ribbon Tag Team Championship. At Ice Ribbon New Ice Ribbon #699 on December 26, 2015, she competed in a captain's fall match in which she teamed up with Hayate, Miyako Matsumoto and Mochi Miyagi in a losing effort against Akane Fujita, Leon, Maruko Nagasaki and Neko Nitta.

=== JWP Joshi Puroresu (2011–2016) ===
Shiota made her professional wrestling debut in JWP Joshi Puroresu on the ninth night of the JWP Road To 20th Anniversary from August 7, 2011, where she fell short to Nana Kawasa in a singles match. She chased for various championships created by the promotion. The first one was the Princess of Pro-Wrestling Championship which she won at JWP 20th Anniversary: Mania-X on April 22, 2012, by defeating Sawako Shimono. She held the championship on two separate occasions along with the JWP Junior Championship by the time both of the titles were sanctioned together. At JWP Fly High In The 25th Anniversary on October 20, 2016, she unsuccessfully challenged Kyoko Kimura for the JWP Openweight Championship.

During her five-year tenure with the promotion, Shiota competed in various of the promotion's signature events. She made her only appearance in the Natsu Onna Kettei Tournament at the 2012 edition, where she teamed up with Tsukasa Fujimoto and defeated Meari Naito and Sachie Abe in the first rounds, but fell short to Hanako Nakamori and Maki Narumiya in the second ones.

As for the Tag League the Best, she made her first appearance at the 2012 edition where she teamed up with Command Bolshoi as "Pikorabi", placing themselves in the block B where hey scored a total of four points after competing against the teams of Uematsu☆Ran (Ran Yu-Yu and Toshie Uematsu), Harukura (Kayoko Haruyama and Tsubasa Kuragaki), Jumonji Sisters (Dash Chisako and Sendai Sachiko), and Tsuki no Ue no Poyo (Manami Katsu and Moon Mizuki). At the 2013 edition which was used to determine the number one contenders to the Daily Sports Women's and JWP Tag Team Championships, she teamed up with Manami Katsu as "Manarabi" and competed in the block B where they scored a total of two points after going against The☆Wanted!? (Kazuki and Sachie Abe), and Jumonji Sisters (Dash Chisako and Sendai Sachiko). She won the whole 2014 edition where she teamed up with Tsukushi as "Haruusagi", placing the first in the block A where they scored a total of four points after competing against the teams of Arisa Nakajima and Kana, Command Bolshoi and Kyoko Kimura, and The☆Wanted!? (Kazuki and Rydeen Hagane), and then outmatched Mascara Voladoras (Leon and Ray) in the finals. At the 2015 edition, she teamed up with Tsukushi again in the block B where they scored two points after going against Wild Snufkin (Command Bolshoi and Kyoko Kimura), Eri and Haruka Kato, and The☆Wanted!? (Kazuki and Rydeen Hagane). She marked her last appearance at the 2016 edition where she teamed up with Command Bolshoi and fell short to Kagetsu and Sawako Shimono in the first rounds.

Shiota's retirement match took place at JWP Climax 2016 on December 28, where she fell short to Sareee.

=== Pure-J (2018) ===
Shiota came out of retirement for one night only at PURE-J/Manami Katsu Produce 24th Dojo Show, and event promoted by Pure-J, the successor promotion of JWP Joshi Puroresu on October 6, 2018, where she fell short to Manami Katsu in special singles competition.

== Championships and accomplishments ==
- Independent League
  - TLW World Women's Tag Team Championship (1 time) – with Command Bolshoi
- JWP Joshi Puroresu
  - JWP Junior Championship (2 times)
  - Princess of Pro-Wrestling Championship (2 times)
  - Tag League the Best (2014) – with Tsukushi
- Pro Wrestling Wave
  - Catch the Wave Award (1 time)
    - Fighting Spirit Award (2016)
