= Akari (wrestler) =

Japanese professional wrestler

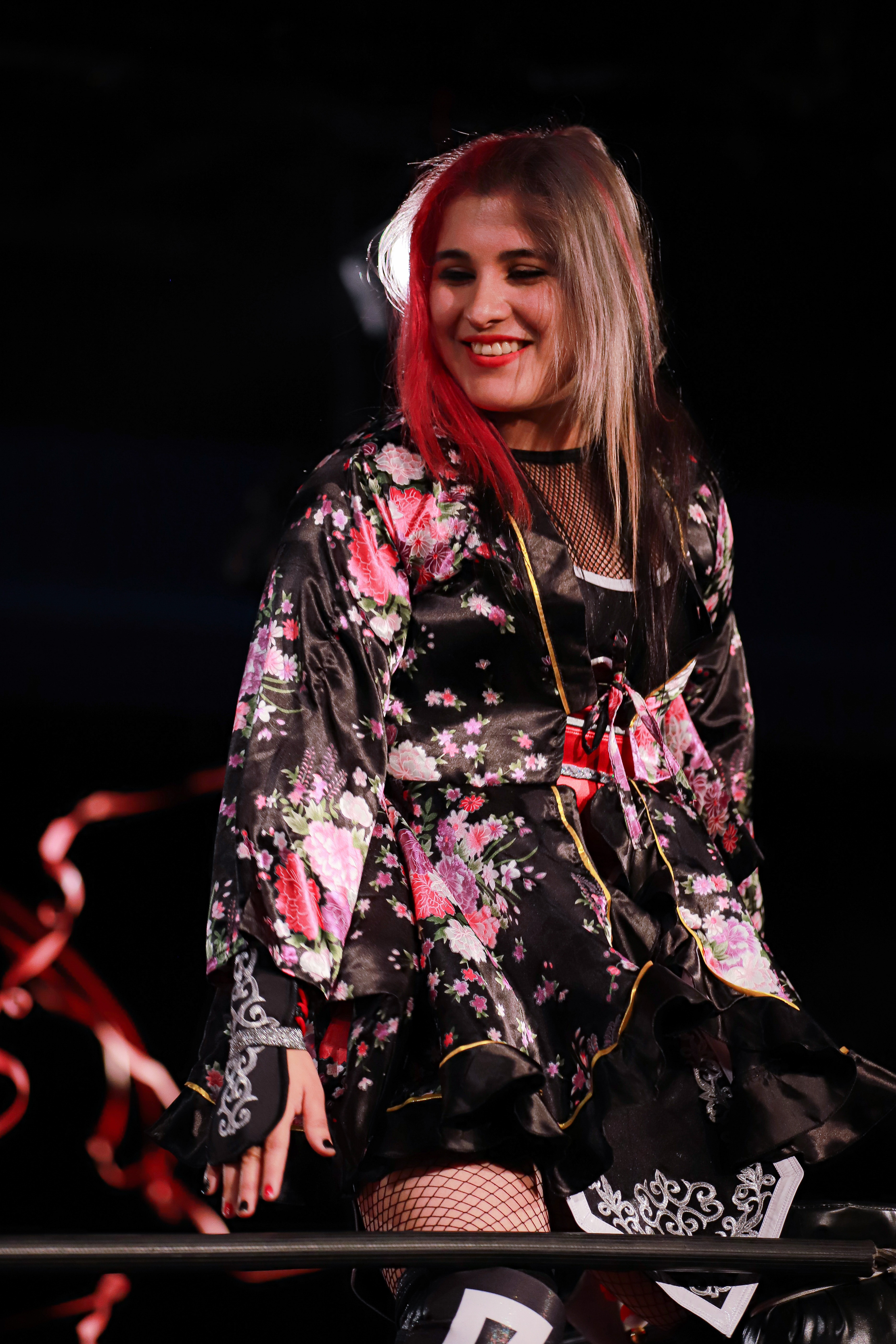
- Akari in May 2023

Personal information
- Born: Benita Elgueta Saldias; February 9, 1994 (age 32) San Antonio, Chile

Professional wrestling career
- Ring name(s): Akari; AKARI
- Billed height: 160 cm (5 ft 3 in)
- Billed weight: 65 kg (143 lb)
- Trained by: Command Bolshoi; Super Hanzo
- Debut: 2019

Bemita Elgueta Saldias, better known by her ring name Akari (sometimes stylized in capital letters as AKARI), is a Chilean professional wrestler currently performing in the Japanese promotion Pure-J where she is a former Princess of Pro-Wrestling Champion.

== Professional wrestling career ==
=== Independent scene (2019–present) ===
Due to partially working as a freelancer, Saldias competed in several companies of the Japanese independent scene. At a house show produced by World Woman Pro-Wrestling Diana on September 15, 2019, she teamed up with Leon and fell short to Crysis (Ayako Sato and Jaguar Yokota). At JTO Hatsu, an event promoted by Professional Wrestling Just Tap Out on January 14, 2020, she teamed up with Tomoka Inaba to defeat May Lee and Crea. At WAVE Survival Dance ~ Regina Challenge, an event promoted by Pro Wrestling Wave on October 24, 2022, she competed in a contendership battle royal for the Wave Single Championship won by Yuki Miyazaki and also involving many other notable opponents such as Ayame Sasamura, Hibiscus Mii, Itsuki Aoki, Miyako Matsumoto, Sakura Hirota, Rina Amikura, Yuko Sakurai and many others. At Ice Ribbon New Ice Ribbon #1270, an event promoted by Ice Ribbon on April 8, 2023, Saldias teamed up with Misa Kagura to defeat Kaho Matsushita and Yuko Sakurai.

=== Pure-J (2019–present) ===
Saldias made her professional wrestling debut in Pure-J at PURE-J Bolshoi Retirement ~ Thank You!!, an event produced on April 21, 2019, where she teamed up with Kazuki and Rydeen Hagane in a losing effort against Manami Katsu, Mari Manji and Yako Fujigasaki as a result of a six-woman tag team match. During her time in the company, she chased for various championships promoted by it. At PURE-J Pure Slam Vol. 1 on August 18, 2019, she teamed up with Kaori Yoneyama to unsuccessfully challenge Makoto and Moeka Haruhi for the Daily Sports Women's Tag Team Championship. She won her first title, the Princess of Pro-Wrestling Championship by taking part in a tournament hosted to crown a new champion over the vacant belt. Saldias defeated Madeline in the semifinals and Momo Tani in the finals to win the championship at PURE-J Fight Together 2021 on February 7. At PURE-J Fight Together Vol. 2 on September 23, 2022, she unsuccessfully challenged Yuu for the Pure-J Openweight Championship. She participated in various other match gimmicks. At PURE-J Pure Slam Vol. 10 on December 1, 2019, she competed in a costume battle royal won by Moeka Haruhi and also involving Hanako Nakamori, Manami Katsu, Leon, Crea and others.

==== Sendai Girls' Pro Wrestling (2019–present) ====
Due to Pure-J holding business partnerships with Sendai Girls' Pro Wrestling, Saldias regularly competes in various of the latter promotion's events. She made her debut in the promotion at a house show promoted on August 31, 2019, where she fell short to Kaoru in singles competition. At a house show from February 19, 2020, she unsuccessfully challenged Manami for the Sendai Girls Junior Championship. Saldias took part in the 2020 edition of the Jaja Uma Tournament in which she fell short to Mikoto Shindo in the first rounds from March 28.

==== Seadlinnng (2021–present) ====
Another promotion in which she often competes is Seadlinnng, where she is known for seldomly evolving in "high speed" bouts. At SEAdLINNNG 2021 Opening Match on November 1, she participated in this kind of bout, where she teamed up with Ibuki Hoshi and unsuccessfully competed against Chikayo Nagashima and Tsukushi Haruka, and Kaho Kobayashi and Leon. She also competed in other ordinary tag team matches, such as one from SEAdLINNNG Shin-Kiba Series 2023 Vol. 2 on March 20, where she teamed up with Amazon and fell short to Las Fresa de Egoistas (Asuka and Makoto), and Hiroyo Matsumoto and Ryo Mizunami.

== Championships and accomplishments ==
- Pure-J
  - Princess of Pro-Wrestling Championship (1 time)
  - Daily Sports Women's Tag Team Championship (1 time) – with Crea
  - Princess Of Pro Wrestling Title Tournament (2021)

== Filmography ==
Year	Title	Role	Notes
2024	The Queen of Villains	Galatica	
