= Yako Fujigasaki =

Japanese professional wrestler

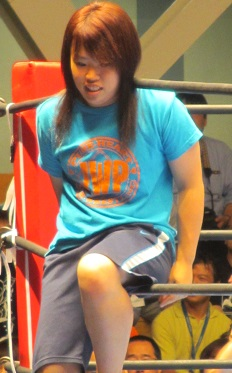
- Fujigasaki in August 2015

Personal information
- Born: May 8, 1997 (age 29) Chiba, Japan

Professional wrestling career
- Ring name(s): Yako; Yako Fujigasaki
- Billed height: 160 cm (5 ft 3 in)
- Billed weight: 63 kg (139 lb)
- Trained by: Sachie Abe; Leon
- Debut: 2013

Yako Fujigasaki (藤ヶ崎矢子, Fujigasaki Yako) is a Japanese professional wrestler, best known for her tenure with the Japanese promotions JWP Joshi Puroresu and Pure-J.

== Professional wrestling career ==
=== Independent circuit (2013–present) ===
As a freelancer, Fujigasaki is known for competing in multiple promotions of the Japanese independent scene. At New Ice Ribbon #513, an event promoted by Ice Ribbon on November 16, 2013, she lost in a singles match against Tsukushi Haruka. At Gatoh Move Japan Tour #281, an event promoted by Gatoh Move Pro Wrestling on March 28, 2017, Fujigasaki won against Emi Sakura W. At Sendai Girls Igarashi Shokai Halloween, an event produced by Sendai Girls' Pro Wrestling on October 22, 2017, she teamed up with Mika Shirahime and lost to Hanako Nakamori and Meiko Satomura. At an Oz Academy La Festa event from March 21, 2019, she teamed up with Mayumi Ozaki and Saori Anou and lost to Aja Kong, Hikaru Shida and Makoto.

=== JWP Joshi Puroresu (2013–2017) ===
Fujigasaki spent the majority of her career with JWP Joshi Puroresu. She made her professional wrestling debut on August 18, 2013, at JWP Pure Violence Road .15, where she went into a time-limit draw against Rydeen Hagane in an exhibition match. Her last appearance with the promotion was at JWP Fly High In The 25th Anniversary Party ~ The Thanksgiving, the last event before its closure, where she competed in a 17-woman battle royal with Dash Chisako, Hana Kimura, Jaguar Yokota, Command Bolshoi, Yumiko Hotta, Sachie Abe, and others.

Fujigasaki competed in the Tag League the Best tournament, making her first appearance in 2014. She competed on a team with Sachie Abe in the B Block division, and scored no points against Spring☆Victory (Kayoko Haruyama and Manami Katsu), Mascara Voladoras (Leon and Ray), and Hanako Nakamori and Takako Inoue. In 2015, she competed on a team with Yua Hayashi in the B Block against Orange Happies (Aoi Kizuki and Kayoko Haruyama), Voladoras L×R (Leon and Ray), and Arisa Nakajima and Hanako Nakamori. The team did not score any points.

=== Pure-J (2017–2019) ===
Fujigasaki remained at Pure-J, the successor to JWP. She competed at the PURE-J Debut Show ~ Dream Go! on August 11, 2017, losing to Takako Inoue. At a house show promoted on March 17, 2019, Fujigasaki teamed up with Moeka Haruhi to unsuccessfully challenge Wanted (Kazuki and Rydeen Hagane) for the Daily Sports Women's Tag Team Championship.

=== Pro Wrestling Wave (2013–present) ===
Fujigasaki is also part of Pro Wrestling Wave's roster, with whom she makes sporadic appearances. She competed in the Catch the Wave tournament where she scored a total of two points against Yuka, Konami and Maruko Nagasaki in "Young Block Oh! Oh!". She also competed in the 2016 Dual Shock Wave tournament, where she teamed up with Hikaru Shida and fell to Hibiscus Mii and Kaho Kobayashi in a first-round match. At the WAVE 10th Anniversary ~Never Ending Story~ on August 12, 2017, Fujigasaki competed in a battle royal won by Sumire Natsu and also involving Akane Fujita, Kaoru, Manami Toyota, Maya Yukihi, Mima Shimoda, Miyuki Takase, Natsumi Maki, Saki and others. At the WAVE Osaka Rhapsody Vol. 40 on May 19, 2018, Fujigasaki teamed up with Fairy Nihonbashi to unsuccessfully challenge Nagisa Nozaki and Yuki Miyazaki for the Wave Tag Team Championship.

== Championships and accomplishments ==
- JWP Joshi Puroresu
  - JWP Junior Championship (1 time)
  - New Wave Award (2015)
- Pure-J
  - Princess of Pro Wrestling Championship (1 time)
  - Pure-J Year-End Award (1 time)
    - Special Award (2017)
- Other titles
  - BRS Spunky Championship (1 time)
