= KSR Championship =

Details
- Promotion: Pure-J
- Date established: January 13, 2024
- Current champion: Flying Penguin
- Date won: January 19, 2025
Statistics
- First champion: Momo Tani
- Longest reign: Momo Tani (287 days)
- Oldest champion: Flying Penguin (36 years, 109 days)
- Youngest champion: Momo Tani (32 years, 220 days)

The KSR Championship (KSR王座, KSR Ōza) (abbreviated from "Kansai Survival Revolution" (カンサイ・サバイバル・レボリューション, Kansai Sabaibaru Reboryūshon) is a singles women's professional wrestling championship promoted by Pure-J. the inaugural champion is Momo Tani. The current champion is Flying Penguin in her first reign.

== History ==
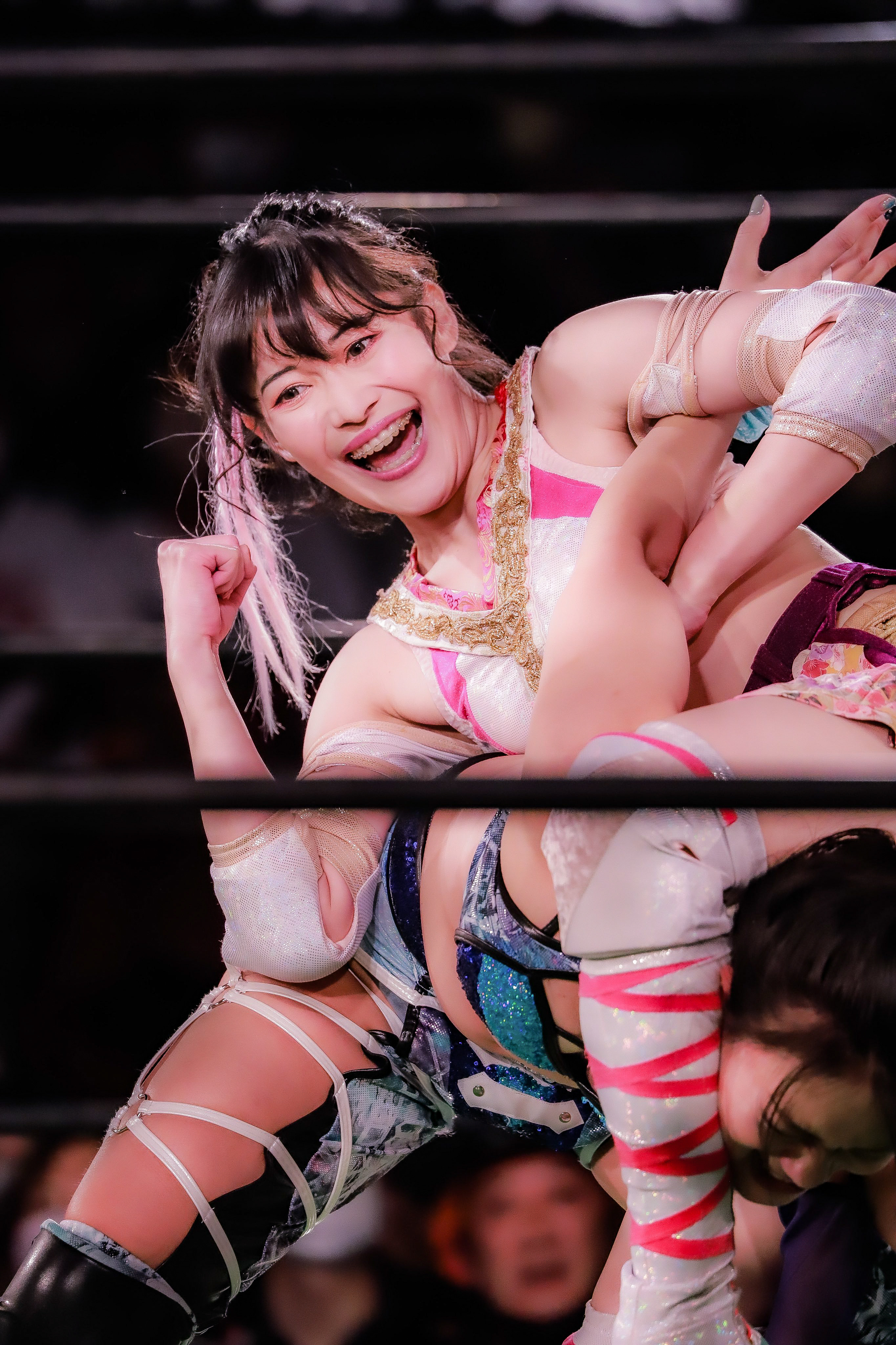
The inaugural KSR Champion Momo Tani

On January 13, 2024, Command Bolshoi introduced the KSR championship, a title limited to the Kansai region in order to promote that region. On April 7, Momo Tani defeated Super W in a tournament final to become the inaugural champion.

=== KSR Championship One Day Tournament (2024) ===
Quarterfinals
Blanca Maho	10:24
Crea	Sub
Chie Ozora	9:45
Super W	Pin
Akari	Sub
Flying Penguin	8:17
Miyuki Takase	8:43
Momo Tani	Pin

Semifinals
Crea	6:17
Super W	Pin
Akari	1:14
Momo Tani	Pin

Final
Super W	8:05
Momo Tani	Sub

== Reigns ==
As of September 30, 2025, there have been two reigns. The inaugural champion was Momo Tani, which her reign lasted for 287 days. The current champion is Flying Penguin. She won the title by defeating Tani at Pure-J Osaka Festival 2025 ~ Winter Battle in January 19, 2025.

Key
No.	Overall reign number
Reign	Reign number for the specific champion
Days	Number of days held
Defenses	Number of successful defenses
<1	Reign lasted less than a day
+	Current reign is changing daily

No.	Champion	Championship change			Reign statistics			Notes	Ref.
No.	Champion	Date	Event	Location	Reign	Days	Defenses	Notes	Ref.
1	Momo Tani	April 7, 2024	Pure-J Osaka Festival 2024	Kawasaki, Japan	1	287	2	Defeated Super W in the finals of an eight-woman single-elimination tournament to become the inaugural champion.	
2	Flying Penguin	January 19, 2025	Pure-J Osaka Festival 2025 ~ Winter Battle	Osaka, Japan	1	254+	2		
