= Crea (wrestler) =

Japanese professional wrestler

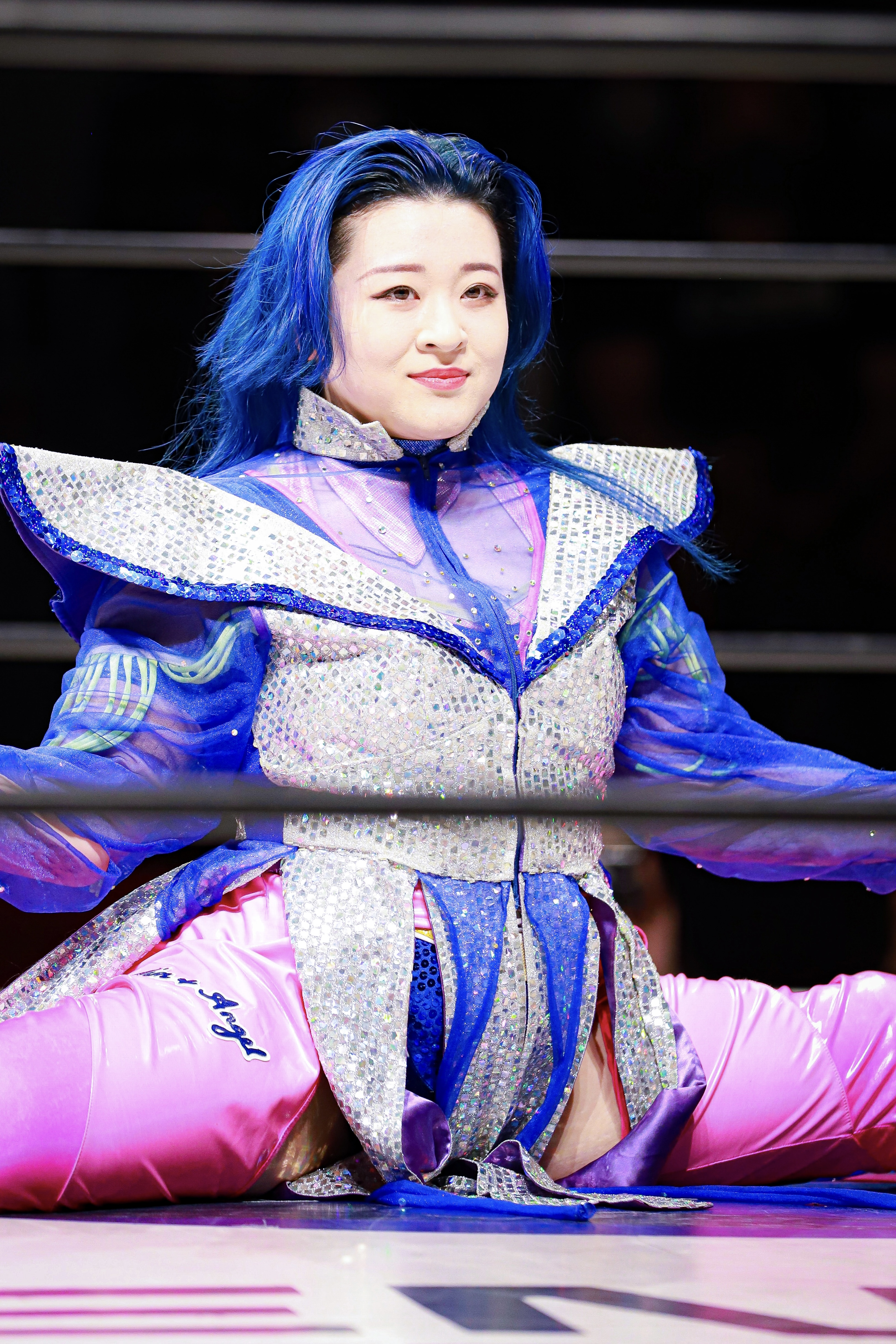
- Crea in April 2023

Personal information
- Born: May 18, 2000 (age 26) Nagoya, Japan

Professional wrestling career
- Ring name(s): Kurea Tsukada; Crea
- Billed height: 163 cm (5 ft 4 in)
- Billed weight: 71 kg (157 lb)
- Trained by: Command Bolshoi
- Debut: 2019

Kurea Tsukada (田 久怜愛, Tsukada Kurea) better known mononymously by her ring name Crea is a Japanese professional wrestler currently performing in the Japanese promotion Pure-J where she is a former Princess of Pro-Wrestling Champion.

== Professional wrestling career ==
=== Independent scene (2019–present) ===
Due to partially working as a freelancer, Tsukada competed in several companies of the Japanese independent scene. At JTO Hatsu, an event promoted by Professional Wrestling Just Tap Out on January 14, 2020, Tsukada teamed up with May Lee in a losing effort against Tomoka Inaba and Akari. At WAVE NAMI 1, an event promoted by Pro Wrestling Wave on September 1, 2021, Tsukada teamed up with Kaori Yoneyama in a losing effort against Itsuki Aoki and Rin Kadokura. At Seadlinnng Shin-Kiba Night! on March 18, 2022, she teamed up with Ryo Mizunami and fell short to Ayame Sasamura and Makoto. On the first night of the Korakuen Hall 60th Anniversary Festival from April 15, 2022, Tsukada teamed up with Asahi and Kaho Matsushita to defeat Kanon, Madeline and Nanami. At a house show promoted by Sendai Girls' Pro Wrestling on April 23, 2022, Tsukada teamed up with Asuka and Miyuki Takase in a losing effort against Saori Anou and Team 200 kg (Chihiro Hashimoto and Yuu) as a result of a six-woman tag team match. At a house show promoted by World Woman Pro-Wrestling Diana on August 13, 2022, she unsuccessfully challenged Ayako Sato for the World Woman Pro-Wrestling Diana World Championship.

=== Pure-J (2019–present) ===
Tsukada made her professional wrestling debut in Pure-J at PURE-J/Leon Produce Lion Heart #7 on July 7, 2019, where she went into a time-limit draw against Rydeen Hagane in an exhibition match. During her tenure with the company, she chased for various championships promoted by it. The first title she has ever challenged for was the Princess of Pro-Wrestling Championship, which she won at PURE-J Rainbow Mountain 2022 August 11 by defeating Haruka Umesaki. At PURE-J 5th Anniversary Osaka Festival on November 27, 2022, Tsukada teamed up with Akari and unsuccessfully challenged Rydeen Hagane and Saki for the Daily Sports Women's Tag Team Championship. She participated in various other match gimmicks. At PURE-J Pure Slam Vol. 10 on December 1, 2019, she competed in a costume battle royal won by Moeka Haruhi and also involving Hanako Nakamori, Kazuki, Manami Katsu, Leon, Mari Manji and others.

=== Ice Ribbon (2020–present) ===
Due to Pure-J holding business partnerships with Ice Ribbon, Tsukada regularly competes in various of the latter promotion's events. She made her first appearance at Ice Ribbon P's Party #47 on June 24, 2020, where she teamed up with Tsukushi and went into a time-limit draw against Haruka Umesaki and Suzu Suzuki. At Ice Ribbon Princess's Party #24 on April 5, 2023, she teamed up with Ibuki Hoshi to defeat Kaho Matsushita and Yuko Sakurai in tag team action.

== Championships and accomplishments ==
- Pure-J
  - Princess of Pro-Wrestling Championship (1 time)
  - Daily Sports Women's Tag Team Championship (1 time) – with Akari
  - Pure-J Year-End Award (1 time)
    - New Wave Award (2019)
