= Momo Tani =

Japanese professional wrestler

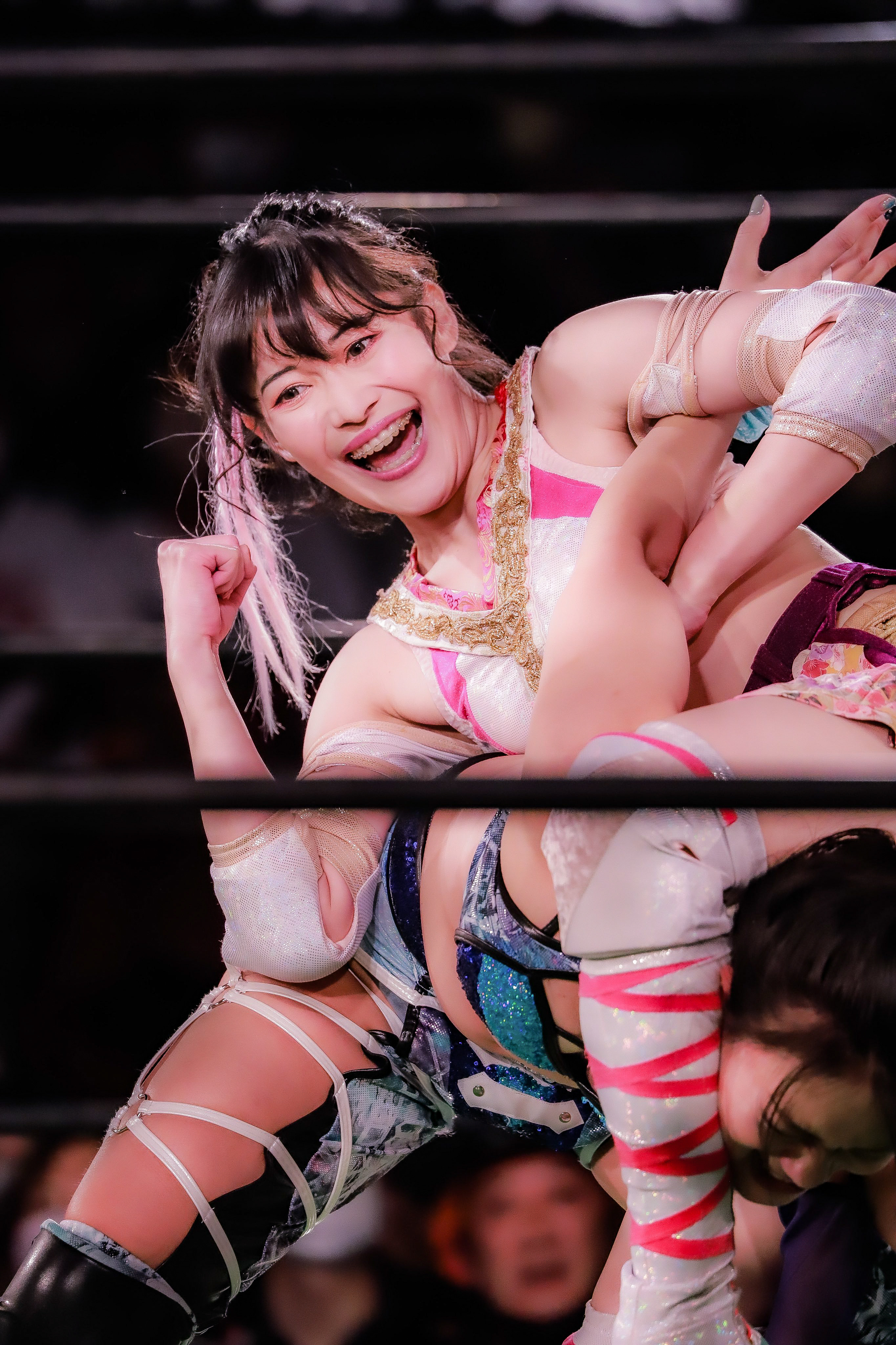
- Tani in November 2022

Personal information
- Born: August 13, 1991 (age 35) Kyoto, Japan

Professional wrestling career
- Ring name: Momo Tani
- Billed height: 162 cm (5 ft 4 in)
- Billed weight: 48 kg (106 lb)
- Debut: 2018

Momo Tani (谷もも, Tani Momo) is a Japanese professional wrestler currently competing in Pure-J where she is a former Daily Sports Women's Tag Team Champion. She is also the inaugural KSR Champion. Tani is best known for her tenure with Actwres girl'Z.

== Professional wrestling career ==
=== Actwres girl'Z (2018–2021) ===
Tani made her professional wrestling debut in Actwres girl'Z at AgZ Act 29 on April 8, 2018, where she fell short to Tae Honma in singles competition. She shared a three-year tenure with the promotion, but has also worked as a freelancer besides. She went after two of the promotion's championships but came unsuccessful in both occasions. She first participated in the inaugural tournament of the AWG Single Championship in which she fell short to Natsumi Maki in the first rounds. She also competed in the inaugural tournament of the AWG Tag Team Championship in which she teamed up with Momo Kohgo and defeated Kaori Yoneyama and Noa Igarashi in the first rounds but fell short to SPiCEAP (Maika Ozaki and Tae Honma) in the second ones.

=== Pure-J (2019–present) ===
Tani made her debut in Pure-J at PURE-J Big Top on April 3, 2019, where she teamed up with Ayumi Hayashi in a losing effort against Wanted (Kazuki and Rydeen Hagane). Although competing as a freelancer, Pure-J became Tani's main field and she started chasing for various accomplishments put at stake by the promotion. She joined the "Wanted" stable during her tenure.

She competed in a tournament to crown a new Princess of Pro-Wrestling Champion in which she defeated Chie Ozora in the semifinals but fell short to Akari in the finals at PURE-J Fight Together 2021 from February 7. At PURE-J 4th Anniversary ~ Rainbow Mountain 2021 on August 9, 2021, Tani teamed up with stablemates Kazuki and Rydeen Hagane in a losing effort against Mission K4 (Akino, Kakeru Sekiguchi and Sonoko Kato). At PURE-J Rainbow Dragon Vol. 2 on February 12, 2024, Tani teamed up stablemate Rydeen Hagane and defeated Cherry and Kazuki to win the Daily Sports Women's Tag Team Championship. At PURE-J Osaka Festival 2024 on April 7, Tani competed in a one-night tournament for the inaugural KSR Championship which she has won by defeating Miyuki Takase in the first rounds, Akari in the semifinals and Super W in the finals.

=== Pro Wrestling Wave (2022–present) ===
Tani often competes for Pro Wrestling Wave. She made her first appearance at WAVE Survival Dance ~ Regina Challenge on October 24, 2022, where she competed in a number one contendership battle royal for the Wave Single Championship won by Yuki Miyazaki and also involving various other notable opponents such as Akane Fujita, Veny, Miyako Matsumoto, Tsubasa Kuragaki, Haruka Umesaki and many others. At WAVE X Bushiroad Jumbo Forever, an event from the retirement road of Himeka Arita co-produced by World Wonder Ring Stardom and Wave on April 28, 2023, Tani competed in a battle royal won by Kakeru Sekiguchi and also involving Ami Sohrei, Hikari Shimizu, Mai Sakurai, Miyuki Takase, and Riko Kawahata, Rina Amikura, Saki, Saori Anou, Tae Honma, Waka Tsukiyama and Yuko Sakurai.

== Championships and accomplishments ==
- Actwres girl'Z
  - Color’s Championship (1 times)
- Pure-J
  - Daily Sports Women's Tag Team Championship (1 time) – with Rydeen Hagane
  - KSR Championship (1 time, inaugural)
  - KSR Championship One Day Tournament (2024)
