= Shuri Okuda =

Japanese professional wrestler (born 1989)

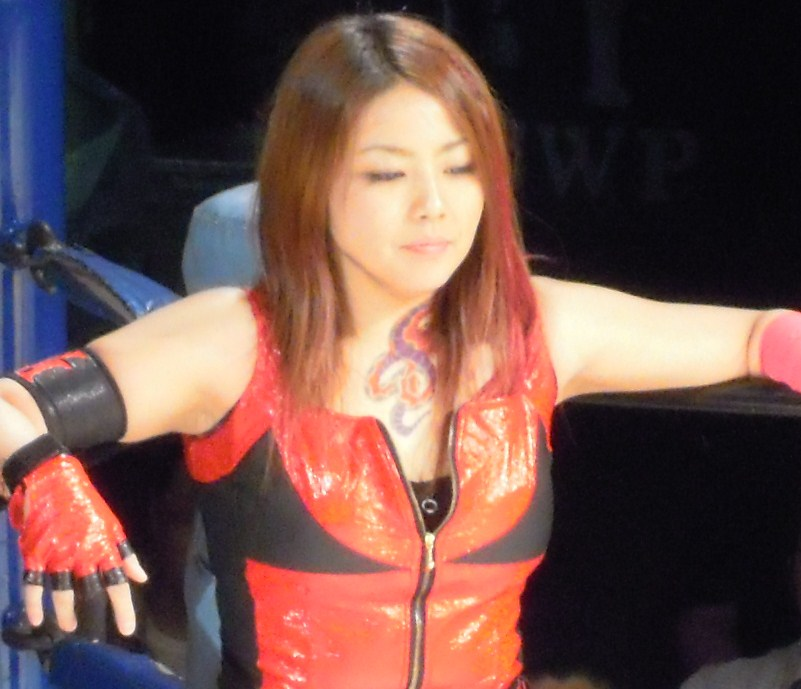
- Okuda in August 2010

Personal information
- Born: Shuri Okuda; November 23, 1989 (age 36) Tadotsu, Kagawa

Professional wrestling career
- Ring name(s): Basara; Shuri Okuda; Tyrannosaurus Okuda
- Billed height: 1.56 m (5 ft 1 1/2 in)
- Billed weight: 61 kg (134 lb)
- Trained by: Meiko Satomura
- Debut: July 9, 2006

Shuri Okuda (奥田 朱理, Okuda Shuri; born November 23, 1989) is a Japanese professional wrestler. Trained by Meiko Satomura, Okuda started her career in the Sendai Girls' Pro Wrestling promotion in 2006, where she originally worked under her real name and later under the ring name Tyrannosaurus Okuda (ティラノサウルス奥田, Tiranosaurusu Okuda). In 2009, Okuda quit Sendai Girls' and affiliated herself with Team Makehen under the new ring name Basara (羽沙羅, Basara). After returning from a year-long hiatus due to a knee injury in March 2012, Okuda became a freelancer and began working for promotions such as Apache Pro-Wrestling Army, Universal Woman's Pro Wrestling Reina and World Woman Pro-Wrestling Diana under her real name.

== Professional wrestling career ==
=== Sendai Girls' Pro Wrestling (2005–2009) ===
Okuda first became interested in professional wrestling, when her elementary school class made a field trip to an All Japan Pro Wrestling (AJPW) event, where she met Taka Michinoku. After deciding to become a professional wrestler herself, Okuda contemplated entering Michinoku's Kaientai Dojo wrestling school, before opting to instead train at a dojo, which concentrated entirely on training female, or joshi, wrestlers. On October 2, 2005, Okuda took part in an audition held by Meiko Satomura, and, after passing it, was admitted to the first training class of Satomura's new Sendai Girls' Pro Wrestling promotion, and began training under her in Sendai the following December. Sendai Girls' held its first event on July 9, 2006, during which the promotion's first four trainees all made their debuts against joshi veterans. While the other three trainees were all defeated in their matches in five to six minutes, Okuda's debut match with Mayumi Ozaki lasted fifteen minutes, but, in the end, also ended in the trainee suffering a defeat. During the rest of the year, Okuda also suffered defeats against Chikayo Nagashima, Devil Masami and Hiroyo Matsumoto, before gaining her first win on January 10, 2007, by defeating fellow trainee Sachiko Kanari. On April 8, Okuda entered the Battlefield War Tournament, again defeating Sachiko Kanari in her first round match. On May 6, she was eliminated from the tournament in the second round by Ayako Hamada, who would go on to win the entire tournament. On July 14, Okuda accompanied Meiko Satomura to an Oz Academy event, where she, after a match, confronted Satomura's opponent Aja Kong and eventually accepted her challenge for a match between the two. On August 16, Okuda made her in-ring debut for the promotion, unsuccessfully challenging Kong for the Oz Academy Openweight Championship. On August 26, Okuda made her debut for the JWP Joshi Puroresu promotion, teaming with Ayana Mizumura and Meiko Satomura in a six-woman tag team match, where they defeated Arisa Nakajima, Kaori Ohki and Tsubasa Kuragaki.

In September 2007, all five Sendai Girls' trainees were given new ring names as a sign of their progress. Sendai Girls' co-founder Jinsei Shinzaki, remembering past wrestlers like Jaguar Yokota and Lioness Asuka, decided that Okuda should be given the name of an animal and, as a result, she was renamed Tyrannosaurus Okuda. In her first match under the new name on September 8, Okuda teamed with Meiko Satomura in a losing effort against the team of Ayako Hamada and Ayako Sato. Under her new name, Okuda started an interpromotional storyline rivalry with JWP's top junior wrestler, Arisa Nakajima. One early notable match in the rivalry saw Okuda and Nakajima team up with their respective mentors, Meiko Satomura and Azumi Hyuga, in a tag team match at a Sendai Girls' event on October 5, which was won by the JWP duo. In the finish of the match, Hyuga legitimately broke Satomura's orbital bone with a running knee strike, which left her sidelined from in-ring action for over a year. As a result, Satomura positioned Okuda, her top student, as the new face of Sendai Girls' Pro Wrestling. On November 18, Okuda defeated Arisa Nakajima in the main event of a Sendai Girls' event to win the JWP Junior and Princess of Pro-Wrestling (POP) Championships. Okuda made her first defense of the titles on December 9, defeating Kaori Ohki at a JWP event. On December 29, Okuda defeated Hiroyo Matsumoto in the main event of a Sendai Girls' event to make her second successful title defense. Two days later, Okuda appeared at JWP's 5th Junior All Star event, teaming with Aoi Kizuki and Aya Yuki in a six-woman tag team main event, where they were defeated by Arisa Nakajima, Hanako Kobayashi and Hiroyo Matsumoto. On February 23, 2008, Okuda main evented another Sendai Girls' event, losing to Aja Kong in a rematch of their Oz Academy encounter. On March 15, Okuda made her third successful defense of the JWP Junior and POP Championships, defeating Aya Yuki. On April 20, Okuda entered Sendai Girls' first Jaja Uma tournament, defeating Ito Dojo representative Hanako Kobayashi in her first round match, and followed that up by defeating freelancer Kana in her second round match on May 23. On June 8, Okuda returned to JWP, losing the JWP Junior and POP Championships back to Arisa Nakajima in her fourth defense.

On June 27, Okuda was eliminated from the Jaja Uma tournament in the semifinals by Ibuki representative Hiroyo Matsumoto. In the finish of the match, Okuda was dropped on her head and neck with a backdrop driver and knocked unconscious. After being taken to a hospital, she was diagnosed with a concussion and a rotator cuff tear on her left shoulder, for which she underwent surgery in November. Before making her return to the ring, Okuda suddenly announced on January 25, 2009, that she was quitting Sendai Girls', relocating to Tokyo and turning freelancer.

=== Freelancing (2009–present) ===
On February 20, 2009, Okuda made an appearance at a Team Makehen event, announcing that she had joined the independent group, as a member of which her independent bookings were handled by its founder Tomohiko Hashimoto. Okuda's jump to the group led to the dissolution of a working relationship between Sendai Girls' and Team Makehen; Io Shirai, Mio Shirai and Mika Mizunuma made regular appearances for Sendai Girls' in 2008, but were no longer booked by the promotion after the jump in 2009. Okuda collaborated with the Ringstars professional wrestling magazine to start a contest for its readers to come up with a new ring name for her. On April 25, Okuda wrestled her first match in ten months at a Team Makehen event, where she, now working under the ring name Basara, teamed with Mikado to defeat Bambi and Mio Shirai in a tag team match. However, just two months later, Team Makehen went inactive as president Tomohiko Hashimoto resigned from his position after being arrested on charges of blackmail. On July 18, Okuda suffered another concussion and canceled all of her scheduled appearances for the rest of the year. In December, Team Makehen was dissolved, making Basara a true freelancer.

Basara finally returned to the ring on April 29, 2010, at a Vader Time independent event. On June 5, she returned to the ring with Hiroyo Matsumoto, losing to her at a NEO Japan Ladies Pro Wrestling event. On July 4, Basara made her debut for Pro Wrestling Wave, when she and Bambi defeated Misaki Ohata and Moeka Haruhi for the TLW World Young Women's Tag Team Championship. On August 5, Basara made a special appearance for All Japan Pro Wrestling, defeating Kyusei Ninja Ranmaru in a singles match. Two days later, Basara returned to JWP, wrestling in a match, where she was defeated by Leon. On September 26, Basara, Leon and Misaki Ohata formed the Shishi no Ana stable, with Basara now scheduled to become a regular member of the JWP roster. On October 31, Basara wrestled at a Yuzuki Aikawa produced Yuzupon Matsuri event, facing American Hailey Hatred. The match had to be ended abruptly, when Basara suffered a knee injury and was unable to continue. Okuda underwent surgery on April 8, 2011, and was sidelined from in-ring action for the entire year. She was originally scheduled to make her return at a Happy Hour!! event on December 18, but the return had to be postponed, when the event was canceled. On March 7, 2012, Okuda announced that she would wrestle her return match on March 25 at an event held by the Apache Pro-Wrestling Army promotion. On March 25, Basara was defeated by Taka Michinoku in her return match. On April 22, Basara made her debut for Universal Woman's Pro Wrestling Reina at Reina 31, wrestling Saya to a ten-minute time limit draw and then challenging the promotion's founder, Yumiko Hotta, to a match. Seven days later at Reina 32, Basara was defeated by Hotta. Following the match, Hotta suggested that Basara turn a new leaf in her career and return to competing under her real name. On May 13 at Reina.33, Okuda, now once again working under her real name, teamed with Saya in a tag team match, where they were defeated by Hikaru Shida and Tsukasa Fujimoto. Following the folding of Reina, most of the promotion's roster remained together to form the new Reina X World promotion, but Okuda chose to follow Yumiko Hotta out and on May 22, the two, along with Saya, made their debut as a unit for the World Woman Pro-Wrestling Diana promotion, interrupting a main event battle royal and starting an invasion storyline with the promotion. On June 25, Okuda was again sidelined, after suffering yet another knee injury while training. Okuda underwent two knee surgeries, first in August 2012 and the second in April 2013.

On May 24, 2015, Okuda returned to the ring, wrestling her first match in nearly three years at an event co-produced by Apache Pro-Wrestling Army and Doutonbori Pro Wrestling, where she, Hasegawa and Mede Tiger Mask defeated Mister Furyu, Mister UO and Super Delfin. Having passed what she called her "test match", Okuda wrestled her proper comeback match on July 17 at Sano Damashii's big Ryōgoku Kokugikan event, where she, Hi69 and Yosuke Enomoto defeated Hasegawa, Mika Iida and Tomohiko Hashimoto in a six-person intergender tag team match.

== Championships and accomplishments ==
- JWP Joshi Puroresu
  - JWP Junior Championship (1 time)
  - Princess of Pro-Wrestling Championship (1 time)
  - 5th Junior All Star Best Bout Award (2007) with Aoi Kizuki and Aya Yuki vs. Arisa Nakajima, Hanako Kobayashi and Hiroyo Matsumoto on December 31
- Pro Wrestling Wave
  - TLW World Young Women's Tag Team Championship (1 time) – with Bambi
