= Rydeen Hagane =

Japanese professional wrestler

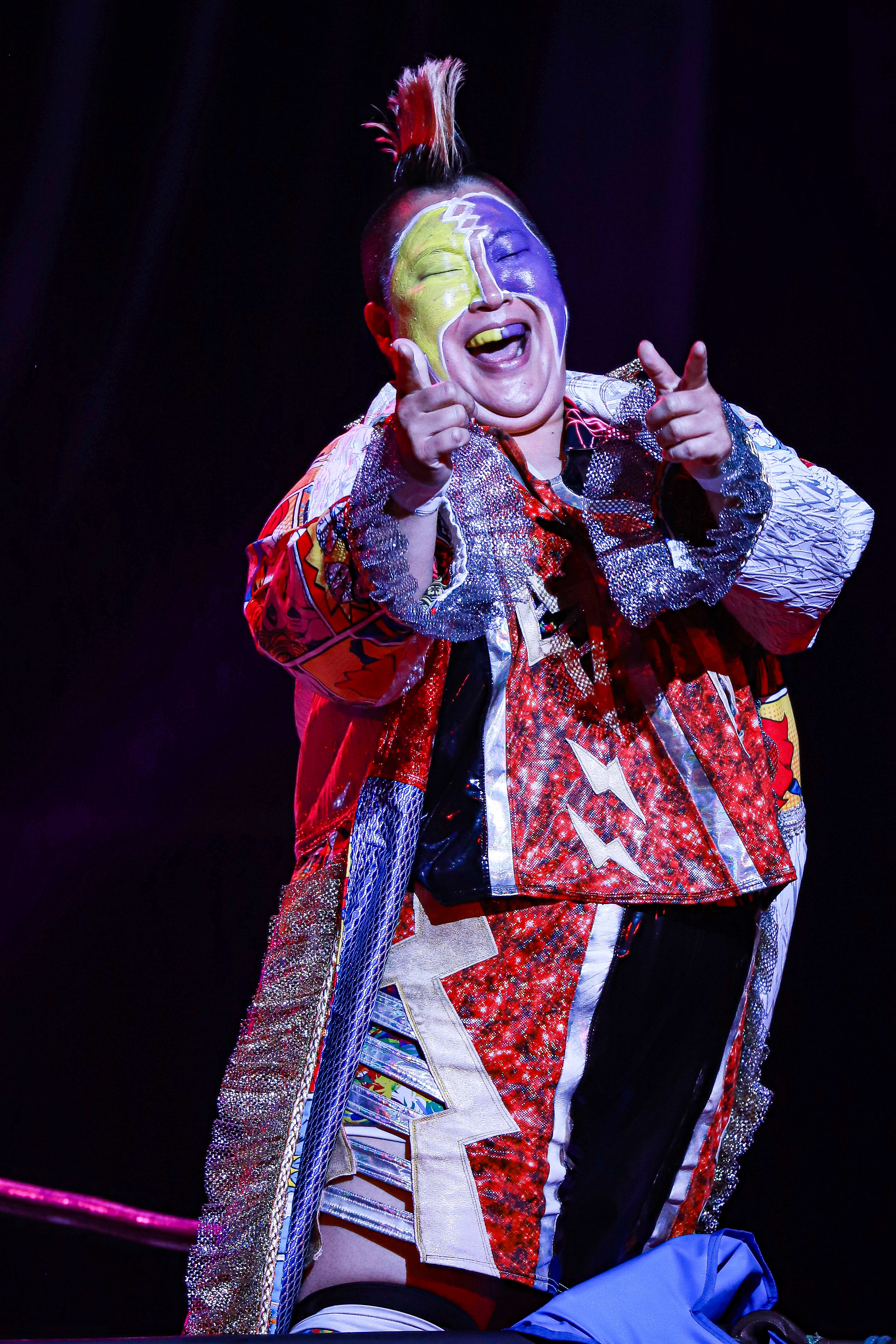
- Hagane in July 2023

Personal information
- Born: October 25, 1991 (age 35) Kama, Japan

Professional wrestling career
- Ring names: Hagane Goriki; Noriko Matsumoto; Rydeen Hagane; Raideen Steel; Lady Steel
- Billed height: 163 cm (5 ft 4 in)
- Billed weight: 86 kg (190 lb)
- Trained by: Leon; Kazuki
- Debut: 2012

Noriko Matsumoto (松本 法子, Matsumoto Noriko) better known by her ring name Rydeen Hagane (ライディーン鋼, Raidīn Hagane) is a Japanese professional wrestler currently working as a freelancer and is best known for her tenure with the Japanese promotion Pure-J, and JWP Joshi Puroresu.

== Professional wrestling career ==
=== Independent circuit (2013–present) ===
Matsumoto is known for competing in various promotions from the Japanese independent scene. At a house show promoted by Sendai Girls' Pro Wrestling on July 21, 2017, she teamed up with Chihiro Hashimoto and Reina Isis in a losing effort against Hana Kimura, Hiroyo Matsumoto and Meiko Satomura. At Seadlinnng Endless Summer! on September 5, 2018, she teamed up with Hanako Nakamori and Command Bolshoi to defeat High Voltage (Akane Fujita & Ryo Mizunami) and Miyuki Takase. At Pro-Wrestling ACE Vol. 8, an event produced by Wrestle-1 on November 18, 2017, she unsuccessfully faced Hikaru Shida in singles competition. She has also competed as joshi talent into male promotion shows such as at Pro Wrestling Zero1 Ekimae Festa 2019 from March 16, where she teamed up with Takako Inoue and Aja Kong in a losing effort against Kaoru Ito, Kyoko Inoue and Sareee. At Oz Academy First Hunt on August 11, 2020, she teamed up with Tsubasa Kuragaki and Yoshiko to defeat Beast Friend (Aja Kong, Hiroyo Matsumoto and Kaori Yoneyama). At Ice Ribbon BIG DEKAI Produce on October 10, 2022, she teamed up with Maika Ozaki to defeat Misa Kagura and Yuna Manase. Matsumoto also competed in independent events such as the first night of the Korakuen Hall 60th Anniversary Festival from April 15, 2022, where she teamed up with Akino and Ayako Sato in a losing effort against Sonoko Kato, Leon and Kyoko Inoue.

=== JWP Joshi Puroresu (2012–2017) ===
Matsumoto made her professional wrestling debut in JWP Joshi Puroresu at JWP 3rd Lion's Hole Produce ~ Hanako Nakamori & Misaki Ohata Graduation on August 12, 2012, where she wrestled her coach Leon into a time-limit draw. She chased for various championships created by the promotion. The first one was the Princess of Pro-Wrestling Championship which she won at X-Mania on April 5, 2015, by defeating Rabbit Miu. She held the championship on two separate occasions along with the JWP Junior Championship by the time both of the titles were sanctioned together. On the second night of the JWP FLY HIGH IN THE 25TH ANNIVERSARY from April 24, she unsuccessfully challenged Arisa Nakajima for the JWP Openweight Championship. Matsumoto competed in the final show before the promotion's closure, the JWP Fly High In The 25th Anniversary Party ~ The Thanksgiving from April 2, 2017, where she teamed up with Kazuki to unsuccessfully challenge Command Bolshoi and Leon for both the JWP Tag Team Championship and the Daily Sports Women's Tag Team Championship.

During her five-year tenure with the promotion, Matsumoto competed in one of its signature events, the Tag League the Best, in which she made her first appearance at the 2014 edition where she teamed up with her "The☆Wanted!?" stablemate Kazuki, placing themselves in the block A where they scored a total of two points after going against the teams of Command Bolshoi and Kyoko Kimura, Arisa Nakajima and Kana, and Haruusagi (Rabbit Miu and Tsukushi). At the 2015 edition, she teamed up with Kazuki again, this time placing themselves in the block B, where they scored a total of two points after competing against the teams of Eri and Haruka Kato, Haruusagi (Rabbit Miu and Tsukushi), and Wild Snufkin Command Bolshoi and Kyoko Kimura. One year later at the 2016, edition which was held under a single elimination tournament format, she teamed again with Kazuki and defeated Meiko Tanaka and Sareee in the first rounds, Konami and Syuri in the second rounds, but fell short to Hanako Nakamori and Makoto in the finals.

=== Pure-J (2017–present) ===
After JWP Joshi Puroresu's closure in April 2017, Matsumoto moved alongside most of the promotion's roster to the newly founded promotion of Pure-J. She made her first in-ring appearance at PURE-J Debut Show ~ Dream Go! on August 11, 2017, where she fell short to Hiroyo Matsumoto in a singles match.

== Championships and accomplishments ==
- JWP Joshi Puroresu
  - JWP Junior Championship (2 times)
- Pure-J
  - Daily Sports Women's Tag Team Championship (3 times) – with Kazuki (1), Saki (1) and Momo Tani (1)
  - Princess of Pro-Wrestling Championship (2 times)
  - Pure-J Openweight Championship (2 times)
