= JWP Junior Championship =

Professional wrestling women's championship

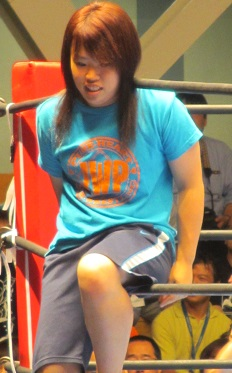
- Yako Fujigasaki, the final JWP Junior Champion

Details
- Promotion: JWP Joshi Puroresu
- Date established: June 16, 1995
- Date retired: April 2, 2017
Statistics
- First champion: Candy Okutsu
- Most reigns: Arisa Nakajima, Candy Okutsu, Hiromi Yagi, Rabbit Miu and Rydeen Hagane (2 reigns)
- Longest reign: Kaori Yoneyama (771 days)
- Shortest reign: Candy Okutsu (<1 day)
- Oldest champion: Rina Yamashita (26 years, 45 days)
- Youngest champion: Rabbit Miu (16 years, 60 days)

The JWP Junior Championship was a women's professional wrestling championship owned by the JWP Joshi Puroresu promotion. It was introduced on June 16, 1995, when Candy Okutsu defeated Hiromi Sugou and Hiromi Yagi in a three-way match to become the inaugural champion.

On June 17, 2007, the reigning JWP Junior Champion Arisa Nakajima won the Princess of Pro-Wrestling (POP) Championship on the JDStar promotion's second to last event. Though the two titles were technically not unified, they were defended together from this point onward. The titles remained together in JWP for nearly a decade before it was announced on February 8, 2017, that the promotion was shutting down. As a result, the two titles would once again be separated with the JWP title remaining with the promotion's production company, while the POP title moved on to Command Bolshoi's follow-up promotion to JWP. It is currently unknown whether the JWP producers plan to stay in the professional wrestling business.

The JWP Junior Championship was originally meant for wrestlers with less than four years of experience in professional wrestling, but in June 2010, the limit was raised to five years. In May 2012, the experience limit was lowered back down to four years. The title was vacated eight times; five times due to the reigning champion surpassing the experience limit.

Like most professional wrestling championships, the title was won as a result of a scripted match. There were thirty-one reigns shared among twenty-six different wrestlers. The title was retired on April 2, 2017, when JWP Joshi Puroresu went out of business. That same day, Yako Fujigasaki won the final match contested for the JWP Junior Championship by making her second successful defense against Saori Anou.

== History ==
Candy Okutsu was the first champion in the title's history and Yako Fujigasaki the final. She also shares the record for most reigns with Arisa Nakajima, Hiromi Yagi, Rabbit Miu and Rydeen Hagane, with two. Kaori Yoneyama only reign holds the record for the longest reign, at 771 days, while Okutsu's second reign holds the record for the shortest reign at less than one day. Overall, there were thirty-one reigns shared among twenty-six different wrestlers.

== Title history ==
Key
No.	Overall reign number
Reign	Reign number for the specific champion
Days	Number of days held
Defenses	Number of successful defenses

No.	Champion	Championship change			Reign statistics			Notes	Ref.
No.	Champion	Date	Event	Location	Reign	Days	Defenses	Notes	Ref.
1	Candy Okutsu	June 16, 1995	House show	Tokyo, Japan	1	173	3	Okutsu defeated Hiromi Sugou and Hiromi Yagi in a three-way match to become the inaugural champion.	
2	Hiromi Yagi	December 6, 1995	House show	Nagoya, Japan	1	1	0		
—	Vacated	December 7, 1995	—	—	—	—	—	Hiromi Yagi vacated the title due to Candy Okutsu breaking a bone during their title match the previous day.	
3	Hiromi Yagi	January 11, 1996	House show	Fukuoka, Japan	2	198	4	Yagi defeated Candy Okutsu to win the vacant title.	
4	Candy Okutsu	July 27, 1996	House show	Nagoya, Japan	2	8	0		
—	Vacated	August 4, 1996	—	—	—	—	—	Candy Okutsu immediately vacated the title due to surpassing its experience limit nine days later.	
5	Tomoko Kuzumi	August 10, 1996	House show	Tokyo, Japan	1	372	10	Kuzumi defeated Rieko Amano in a tournament final to win the vacant championship.	
6	Tomoko Miyaguchi	August 17, 1997	House show	Tokyo, Japan	1	200	5		
—	Vacated	March 5, 1998	—	—	—	—	—	The championship was vacated due to Tomoko Miyaguchi surpassing the experience limit for the junior division.	
7	Kayoko Haruyama	May 12, 1999	House show	Kobe, Japan	1	480	2	Haruyama defeated Tsubasa Kuragaki in a tournament final to win the vacant championship.	
8	Tsubasa Kuragaki	September 3, 2000	House show	Tokyo, Japan	1	419	2		
—	Vacated	October 27, 2001	—	—	—	—	—	The championship was vacated due to Tsubasa Kuragaki surpassing the experience limit for the junior division.	
9	Kobina Ichikawa	December 9, 2001	House show	Tokyo, Japan	1	189	0	Ichikawa won a round-robin tournament, which also involved Kaori Yoneyama and Yuka Nakamura, to win the vacant championship.	
—	Vacated	June 16, 2002	—	—	—	—	—	Kobina Ichikawa vacated the title due to retiring from professional wrestling.	
10	Kaori Yoneyama	July 6, 2002	House show	Tokyo, Japan	1	771	4	Yoneyama defeated Erika Watanabe to win the vacant championship.	
—	Vacated	August 15, 2004	—	—	—	—	—	The championship was vacated due to Kaori Yoneyama surpassing the experience limit for the junior division.	
11	Haruka Matsuo	February 20, 2005	House show	Tokyo, Japan	1	84	0	Matsuo defeated Erika Watanabe in a tournament final to win the vacant championship.	
12	Erika Watanabe	May 15, 2005	Mania-X	Tokyo, Japan	1	202	0		
—	Vacated	December 3, 2005	—	—	—	—	—	Erika Watanabe vacated the championship due to a heart problem.	
13	Arisa Nakajima	December 24, 2006	Climax	Tokyo, Japan	1	329	4	Nakajima defeated Aoi Kizuki in a tournament final to win the vacant championship. From June 17, 2007, onward, the title is defended alongside the Princess of Pro-Wrestling Championship.	
14	Tyrannosaurus Okuda	November 18, 2007	Sendai Girls Live Vol. 14 ~ Hardship	Sendai, Japan	1	203	3		
15	Arisa Nakajima	June 8, 2008	Osaka Pure Fire!!	Osaka, Japan	2	196	1		
16	Hiroyo Matsumoto	December 21, 2008	Ibuki #26	Tokyo, Japan	1	161	2		
17	Misaki Ohata	May 31, 2009	Ibuki #29: 4th Anniversary Show	Tokyo, Japan	1	203	2		
18	Ryo Mizunami	December 20, 2009	Sendai Girls Live Vol. 40	Sendai, Japan	1	257	2		
19	Hiren	September 3, 2010	Sendai Girls Live Vol. 46: Zepp Sendai Tournament	Sendai, Japan	1	184	1		
20	Kagetsu	March 6, 2011	Tag League the Best – Day 5	Tokyo, Japan	1	133	4		
21	Sawako Shimono	July 17, 2011	Osaka Joshi Pro 7th Run	Osaka, Japan	1	280	5		
22	Rabbit Miu	April 22, 2012	JWP 20th Anniversary: Mania-X	Tokyo, Japan	1	246	3		
23	Manami Katsu	December 24, 2012	Climax - JWP 20th	Tokyo, Japan	1	482	4		
24	Sareee	April 20, 2014	Mania-X	Tokyo, Japan	1	119	1		
25	Rabbit Miu	August 17, 2014	Pure Plum	Tokyo, Japan	2	231	5		
26	Rydeen Hagane	April 5, 2015	Mania-X	Tokyo, Japan	1	21	0		
27	Rina Yamashita	April 26, 2015	Spring☆Hurricane in Osaka	Osaka, Japan	1	105	0		
28	Kaho Kobayashi	August 9, 2015	Happy Anniversary Wave・8～East～	Tokyo, Japan	1	45	2		
29	Rydeen Hagane	September 23, 2015	Hakata Wave: Bari-chiro 3	Fukuoka, Japan	2	331	4		
—	Vacated	August 19, 2016	—	—	—	—	—	The championship was vacated due to Rydeen Hagane surpassing the experience limit for the junior division.	
30	Hana Kimura	September 18, 2016	Fly High in the 25th Anniversary - Day 7 (Evening Show)	Tokyo, Japan	1	101	3	Kimura defeated Yako Fujigasaki in the finals of a four-woman tournament to win the vacant championship.	
31	Yako Fujigasaki	December 28, 2016	Climax	Tokyo, Japan	1	95	2		
—	Deactivated	April 2, 2017	JWP Fly High in the 25th Anniversary Party ~ The Thanksgiving	Tokyo, Japan	—	—	—	The championship retired when JWP Joshi Puroresu goes out of business.	

== Combined reigns ==
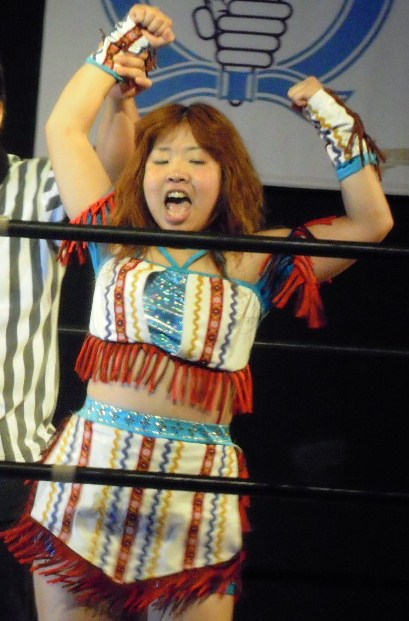
One-time and longest reigning JWP Junior Champion Kaori Yoneyama

Rank	Wrestler	No. of reigns	Combined defenses	Combined days
1	Kaori Yoneyama	1	4	771
2	Arisa Nakajima	2	7	525
3	Manami Katsu	1	4	482
4	Kayoko Haruyama	1	3	480
5	Rabbit Miu	2	8	477
6	Tsubasa Kuragaki	1	2	419
7	Tomoko Kuzumi	1	10	372
8	Rydeen Hagane	2	4	352
9	Sawako Shimono	1	5	280
10	Ryo Mizunami	1	2	257
11	Misaki Ohata	1	2	203
11	Tyrannosaurus Okuda	1	3	203
13	Erika Watanabe	1	0	202
14	Tomoko Miyaguchi	1	5	200
15	Hiromi Yagi	2	4	199
16	Kobina Ichikawa	1	0	189
17	Hiren	1	1	184
18	Candy Okutsu	2	3	181
19	Hiroyo Matsumoto	1	2	161
20	Kagetsu	1	4	133
21	Sareee	1	1	119
22	Rina Yamashita	1	0	105
23	Hana Kimura	1	3	101
24	Yako Fujigasaki	1	2	95
25	Haruka Matsuo	1	0	84
26	Kaho Kobayashi	1	2	45
