= Daily Sports Women's Tag Team Championship =

Professional wrestling championship

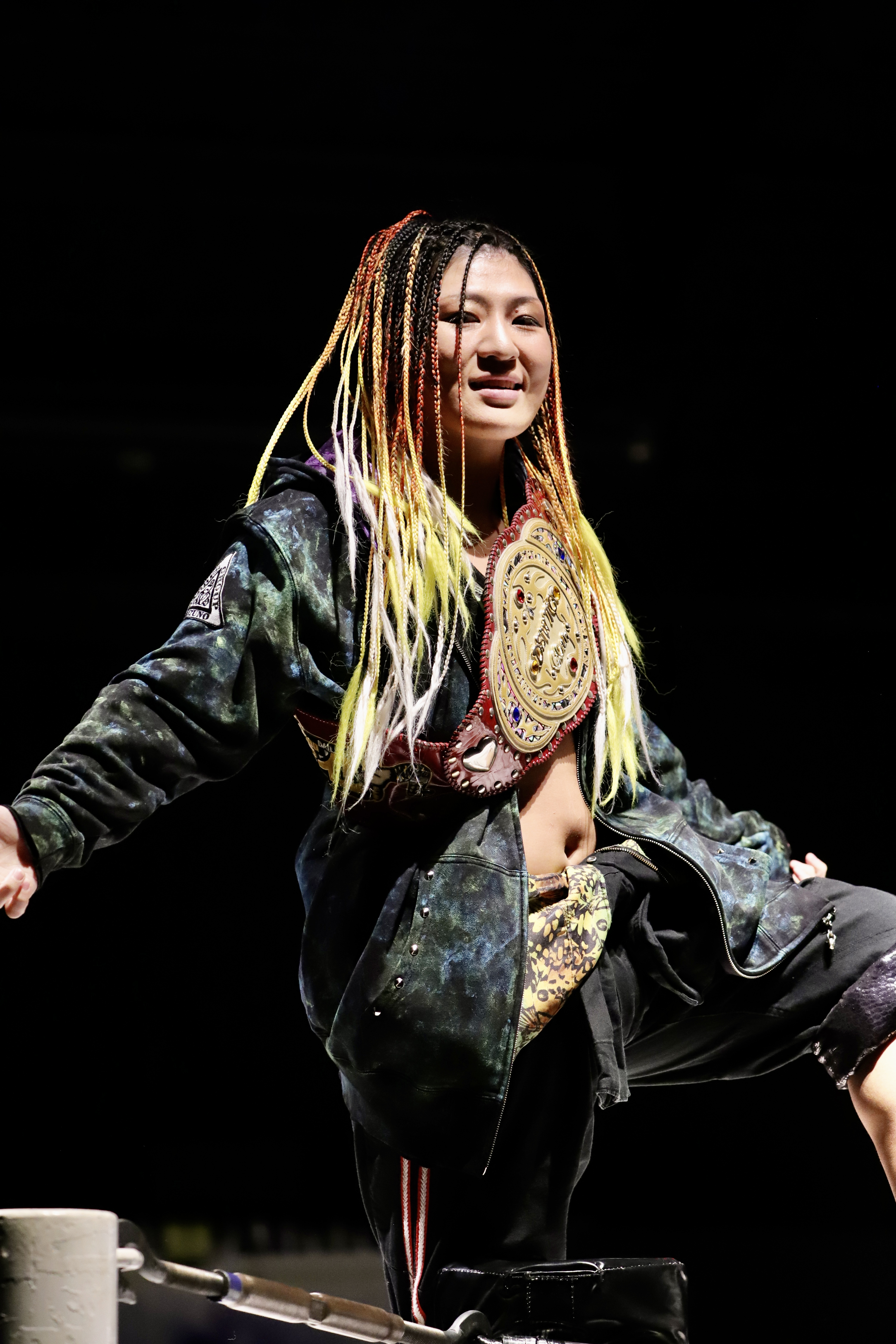
- Rina Yamashita with the current belt design in 2020

Details
- Promotion: JWP Joshi Puroresu; Dream Joshi Puroresu; Pure-J
- Date established: August 3, 2008
- Current champions: Princess Blaze (Chie Ozora and Misa Kagura)
- Date won: August 11, 2026
Statistics
- First champions: Harukura (Kayoko Haruyama and Tsubasa Kuragaki)
- Most reigns: As a team (3 reigns): Harukura (Kayoko Haruyama and Tsubasa Kuragaki); As an individual (6 reigns): Hanako Nakamori; Leon; Kaori Yoneyama
- Longest reign: Command Bolshoi and Leon (713 days)
- Shortest reign: Azumi Hyuga and Ran Yu-Yu, and Uematsu☆Ran (Ran Yu-Yu and Toshie Uematsu) (14 days)
- Oldest champion: Kazuki (50 years, 188 days) (Note: The date of birth of Command Bolshoi is unknown, therefore, this stat might be inaccurate.)
- Youngest champion: Arisa Nakajima (23 years, 135 days)

The Daily Sports Women's Tag Team Championship (デイリースポーツ認定女子タッグ王座, Deirī Supōtsu Nintei Joshi Taggu Ōza) is a professional wrestling tag team championship owned by the Pure-J promotion. The title is named after the Daily Sports newspaper.

== Title history ==
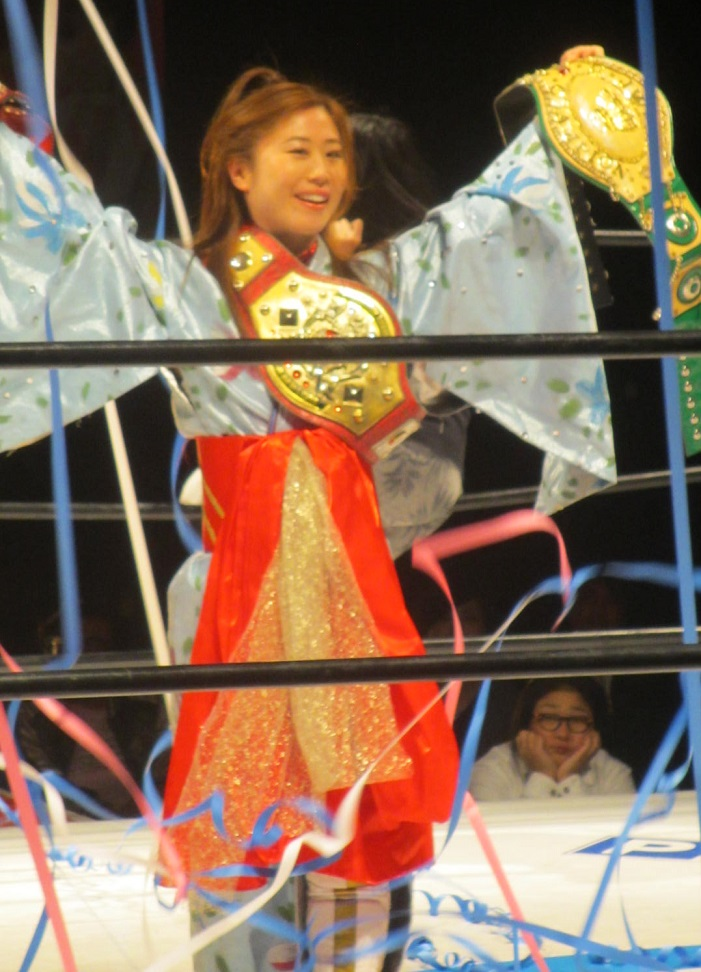
Until JWP Joshi Puroresu closed doors in 2017, the Daily Sports Women's Tag Team Championship was unified with the JWP Tag Team Championship, represented by a green belt held by Tsukasa Fujimoto in her left hand.

The championship was introduced by the JWP Joshi Puroresu promotion on August 3, 2008, when Harukura (Kayoko Haruyama and Tsubasa Kuragaki) defeated Manami Toyota and Yumiko Hotta in a tournament final to become the inaugural champions. The title was afterwards defended together with the JWP Tag Team Championship, with only one exception. On January 16, 2011, Harukura successfully defended just the Daily Sports Women's Tag Team Championship against Hailey Hatred and Kaori Yoneyama. Together, the two titles were sometimes referred to as the "JWP Double Crown Tag Team Championship". When JWP Joshi Puroresu went out of business in April 2017, the two titles were separated again with the JWP title remaining with the JWP production company, while the Daily Sports title moved on to Command Bolshoi's new follow-up promotion, Pure-J.

Like most professional wrestling championships, the title is won as a result of a scripted match.

Harukura (Kayoko Haruyama and Tsubasa Kuragaki) were the first champions in the title's history. Command Bolshoi and Leon's first reign as a team is the longest in the title's history at 713 days. The reign was the final to take place in JWP Joshi Puroresu and the first in Pure-J. The teams of Azumi Hyuga and Ran Yu-Yu, and Uematsu☆Ran (Ran Yu-Yu and Toshie Uematsu) share the record for the shortest reign, at 14 days. Harukura holds the record most reigns as a team, with three. Command Bolshoi holds the record for most reigns individually, with four. Overall, there have been thirty reigns shared among thirty-two different wrestlers and twenty-four teams. Leon and Miyuki Takase are the current champions in their first reign as a team. Individually, this is the fourth reign for Leon.

== Reigns ==
As of November 3, 2026, there have been a total of 35 reigns shared between 29 different teams composed of 36 individual champions and five vacancies. Harukura (Kayoko Haruyama and Tsubasa Kuragaki) were the inaugural champions. Harukura also holds the record for most reigns at three, while individually, Command Bolshoi, Leon, Hanako Nakamori and Kaori Yoneyama are tied with most reigns at four. P-Ray-L (Bolshoi and Leon )'s reign is the longest at 713 days, while Azumi Hyuga and Ran Yu-Yu's reign is the shortest at 14 days. Cherry is the oldest champion at 49 years old, while Arisa Nakajima is the youngest at 23 years old.

Kaori Yoneyama and Kazuki are the current champions in their first reign as a team, while individually, this is the second reign for Haruhi. They won the title by defeating Hanako Nakamori and Kaho Kobayashi at PURE-J Rainbow Unicorn Vol. 7 on June 21, 2026, in Tokyo, Japan.

Key
No.	Overall reign number
Reign	Reign number for the specific team—reign numbers for the individuals are in parentheses, if different
Days	Number of days held
Defenses	Number of successful defenses
+	Current reign is changing daily

No.	Champion	Championship change			Reign statistics			Notes	Ref.
No.	Champion	Date	Event	Location	Reign	Days	Defenses	Notes	Ref.
JWP Joshi Puroresu
1	Harukura (Kayoko Haruyama and Tsubasa Kuragaki)	August 12, 2008	Summer Dream	Tokyo, Japan	1	61	1	Defeated Manami Toyota and Yumiko Hotta in a tournament final to become the inaugural champions. The championship was defended together with the JWP Tag Team Championship.	
2	Uematsu☆Ran (Ran Yu-Yu and Toshie Uematsu)	October 12, 2008	Survival Road 1	Tokyo, Japan	1	105	1		
3	Keito and Yumiko Hotta	January 25, 2009	Osaka Pure Fire!! 2	Osaka, Japan	1	77	1		
4	Command Bolshoi and Megumi Yabushita	April 12, 2009	Mania-X	Tokyo, Japan	1	98	1		
5	YoneSakura (Emi Sakura and Kaori Yoneyama)	July 19, 2009	Pure Slam	Tokyo, Japan	1	147	1		
6	Azumi Hyuga and Ran Yu-Yu (2)	December 13, 2009	Climax - Day 2	Tokyo, Japan	1	14	0	This match was also contested for the International Ribbon Tag Team Championship.	
—	Vacated	December 27, 2009	Climax: Azumi Hyuga Final	Tokyo, Japan	—	—	—	The championship was vacated when Azumi Hyuga retired from professional wrestling.	
7	Kazuki and Toshie Uematsu (2)	March 22, 2010	Road to Mania-X: Open Class Challenge League – Day 7	Tokyo, Japan	1	181	5	Defeated Command Bolshoi and Megumi Yabushita in a tournament final to win the vacant championship.	
8	Aja Kong and Sachie Abe	September 19, 2010	Revolution	Tokyo, Japan	1	95	1		
9	Harukura (Kayoko Haruyama and Tsubasa Kuragaki)	December 23, 2010	Climax	Tokyo, Japan	2	325	3		
10	Queens Revolution (Hailey Hatred and Kaori Yoneyama (2))	November 13, 2011	Road to 20th Anniversary	Tokyo, Japan	1	53	0	This was a title vs. title match in which Hatred and Yoneyama also defended the TLW World Women's Tag Team Championship.	
—	Vacated	January 5, 2012	—	—	—	—	—	Hailey Hatred and Kaori Yoneyama were stripped of the championship as punishment for Yoneyama canceling her announced plan to retire at the end of 2011.	
11	Uematsu☆Ran (Ran Yu-Yu (3) and Toshie Uematsu (3))	April 8, 2012	Tag League the Best - Day 7	Tokyo, Japan	2	22	1	Defeated Hanako Nakamori and Misaki Ohata in the finals of the 2012 Tag League the Best to win the vacant championship.	
—	Vacated	April 30, 2012	JWP 20th Anniversary: Mania X	Tokyo, Japan	—	—	—	The championship was vacated after Toshie Uematsu wrestled her final JWP match before her retirement.	
12	Tai-Pan Sisters/Reset (Emi Sakura (2) and Kaori Yoneyama (3))	May 4, 2012	Live event	Tokyo, Japan	2	107	2	Defeated Command Bolshoi and Rabbit Miu to win the vacant championship.	
13	Arisa Nakajima and Command Bolshoi (2)	August 19, 2012	Pure Slam	Tokyo, Japan	1	140	2		
14	Harukura (Kayoko Haruyama and Tsubasa Kuragaki)	January 6, 2013	Opening Game	Tokyo, Japan	3	224	2		
15	Heart Move (Hanako Nakamori and Morii)	August 18, 2013	Pure Slam	Tokyo, Japan	1	70	0		
—	Vacated	October 27, 2013	—	—	—	—	—	The championship was vacated due to Morii being sidelined with an injured right arm ever since the title win.	
16	Jumonji Sisters (Dash Chisako and Sendai Sachiko)	December 15, 2013	Climax	Tokyo, Japan	1	117	0	Defeated Leon and Ray in the finals of a four-team tournament to win the vacant championship.	
—	Vacated	April 11, 2014	Road to Korakuen	Tokyo, Japan	—	—	—	The championship was vacated due to Sendai Sachiko being sidelined with a knee injury.	
17	Wild Snufkin (Command Bolshoi (3) and Kyoko Kimura)	May 4, 2014	Itabashi May Festival - Day 2	Tokyo, Japan	1	238	3	Defeated Rabbit Miu and Tsukushi in a decision match to win the vacant championship.	
18	Voladoras L×R (Leon and Ray)	December 28, 2014	Climax 2014	Tokyo, Japan	1	209	4		
19	Jumonji Sisters (Dash Chisako and Sendai Sachiko)	July 25, 2015	Tropical Hurricane in Nagoya	Nagoya, Aichi, Japan	2	155	1		
20	Best Friends (Arisa Nakajima (2) and Tsukasa Fujimoto)	December 27, 2015	Climax	Tokyo, Japan	1	231	3		
21	Zenryoku Batankyu (Hanako Nakamori (2) and Kyoko Kimura (2))	August 14, 2016	Pure Plum	Tokyo, Japan	1	148	2		
22	P-Ray-L (Command Bolshoi (4) and Leon (2))	January 9, 2017	Live event	Kawasaki, Kanagawa, Japan	1	713	12	Title separated from the JWP Tag Team Championship on April 2, 2017.	
Pure-J
23	Wanted (Kazuki (2) and Rydeen Hagane)	December 23, 2018	Final Battle	Tokyo, Japan	1	231	3		
24	Makoto and Moeka Haruhi	August 11, 2019	2nd Anniversary	Tokyo, Japan	1	365	4		
25	Hanako Nakamori (3) and Rina Yamashita	August 10, 2020	Pure Dream 2020 ~ Pure-J 3rd and Leon 20th Anniversary	Tokyo, Japan	1	384	4		
26	Cherry and Leon (3)	August 29, 2021	Pure-J GanbaRay 2021	Tokyo, Japan	1	74	2		
27	Arisa Nakajima (3) and Hanako Nakamori (4)	November 11, 2021	Pure Dream 5th Anniversary	Tokyo, Japan	1	248	2		
28	Kakeru Sekiguchi and Kaori Yoneyama (4)	July 17, 2022	Road to Pure-J 5th Anniversary	Tokyo, Japan	1	25	0		
29	Rydeen Hagane (2) and Saki	August 11, 2022	Rainbow Mountain	Tokyo, Japan	1	248	4		
30	Red Soul (Leon (4) and Miyuki Takase)	April 16, 2023	Pure-J Maniax 2023	Tokyo, Japan	1	49	2		
31	Ayaka (Ayako Sato and Hanako Nakamori (5))	June 4, 2023	PURE-J GO! GO! Rainbow Mountain Vol. 4 One Day Tag Tournament	Tokyo, Japan	1	172	2		
32	Prominence (Hiragi Kurumi and Mochi Natsumi)	November 23, 2023	Pure-J	Tokyo, Japan	1	66	2		
33	Kazuki (3) and Cherry (2)	January 28, 2024	PURE-J Rainbow Dragon Vol. 1	Tokyo, Japan	1	15	0		
34	Wanted (Momo Tani and Rydeen Hagane (3))	February 12, 2024	Pure-J Rainbow Dragon Vol. 2	Tokyo, Japan	1	76	0		
35	Red Soul (Leon (5) and Miyuki Takase (2))	April 28, 2024	Pure-J Maniax 2024	Tokyo, Japan	2	231	5		
36	Creakari (Akari and Crea)	December 15, 2024	Pure-J J-Climax 2024	Tokyo, Japan	1	142	2		
37	Rice Leo (Kaori Yoneyama (5) and Leon (6))	May 6, 2025	Pure-J Maniax 2025	Tokyo, Japan	1	75	3		
38	Manahi (Moeka Haruhi (2) and Yuna Manase)	July 20, 2025	PURE-J Pure Spirit Vol. 3	Tokyo, Japan	1	22	0		
39	Kobayashi Group (Hanako Nakamori (6) and Kaho Kobayashi)	August 11, 2025	PURE-J Rainbow Mountain 2025 ~ PURE-J 8th Anniversary	Tokyo, Japan	1	314	5		
40	The Star of Middle Age (Kaori Yoneyama (6) and Kazuki (4))	June 21, 2026	PURE-J Rainbow Unicorn Vol. 7	Tokyo, Japan	1	51	1		
41	Princess Blaze (Chie Ozora and Misa Kagura)	August 11, 2026	PURE-J 9th Anniversary	Tokyo, Japan	1	84+	1		

== Combined reigns ==
As of November 3, 2026

†	Indicates the current champions

=== By team ===
Rank	Team	No. of reigns	Combined defenses	Combined days
1	P-Ray-L (Command Bolshoi and Leon)	1	12	713
2	Harukura (Kayoko Haruyama and Tsubasa Kuragaki)	3	6	610
3	Hanako Nakamori and Rina Yamashita	1	4	384
4	Makoto and Moeka Haruhi	1	4	365
5	Kobayashi Group (Hanako Nakamori and Kaho Kobayashi)	1	5	314
6	Red Soul (Leon and Miyuki Takase)	2	7	280
7	Jumonji Sisters (Dash Chisako and Sendai Sachiko)	2	1	271
8	YoneSakura/Tai-Pan Sisters/Reset (Emi Sakura and Kaori Yoneyama)	2	3	254
9	Rydeen Hagane and Saki	1	4	248
9	Arisa Nakajima and Hanako Nakamori	1	2	248
11	Wild Snufkin (Command Bolshoi and Kyoko Kimura)	1	3	238
12	Best Friends (Arisa Nakajima and Tsukasa Fujimoto)	1	3	231
12	Wanted (Kazuki and Rydeen Hagane)	1	3	231
14	Voladoras L×R (Leon and Ray)	1	4	210
15	Kazuki and Toshie Uematsu	1	5	181
16	Ayaka (Ayako Sato and Hanako Nakamori)	1	2	172
17	Zenryoku Batankyu (Hanako Nakamori and Kyoko Kimura)	1	2	148
18	Creakari (Akari and Crea)	1	2	142
19	Arisa Nakajima and Command Bolshoi	1	2	140
20	Uematsu☆Ran (Ran Yu-Yu and Toshie Uematsu)	2	2	119
21	Command Bolshoi and Megumi Yabushita	1	0	98
22	Aja Kong and Sachie Abe	1	1	95
23	Princess Blaze † (Chie Ozora and Misa Kagura)	1	1	84+
24	Keito and Yumiko Hotta	1	1	77
25	Wanted (Momo Tani and Rydeen Hagane)	1	0	76
26	Rice Leo (Kaori Yoneyama and Leon)	1	3	75
27	Cherry and Leon	1	2	74
28	Heart Move (Hanako Nakamori and Morii)	1	0	70
29	Prominence (Hiragi Kurumi and Mochi Natsumi)	1	2	66
30	Queens Revolution (Hailey Hatred and Kaori Yoneyama)	1	0	57
31	The Star of Middle Age (Kaori Yoneyama and Kazuki)	1	1	51
32	Kakeru Sekiguchi and Kaori Yoneyama	1	0	25
33	Manahi (Moeka Haruhi and Yuna Manase)	1	0	22
34	Kazuki and Cherry	1	0	15
35	Azumi Hyuga and Ran Yu-Yu	1	0	14

=== By wrestler ===
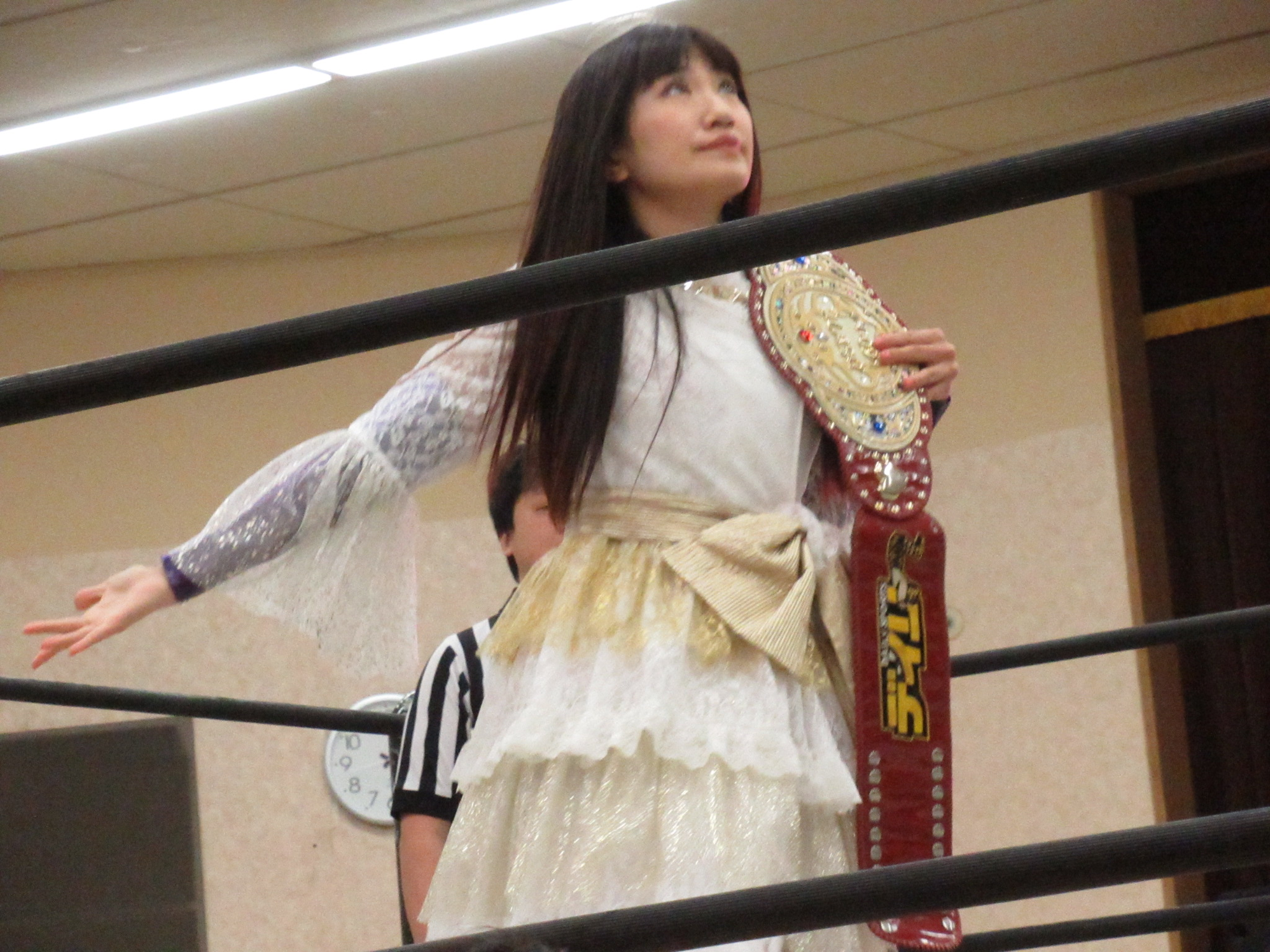
Two-time champion Moeka Haruhi

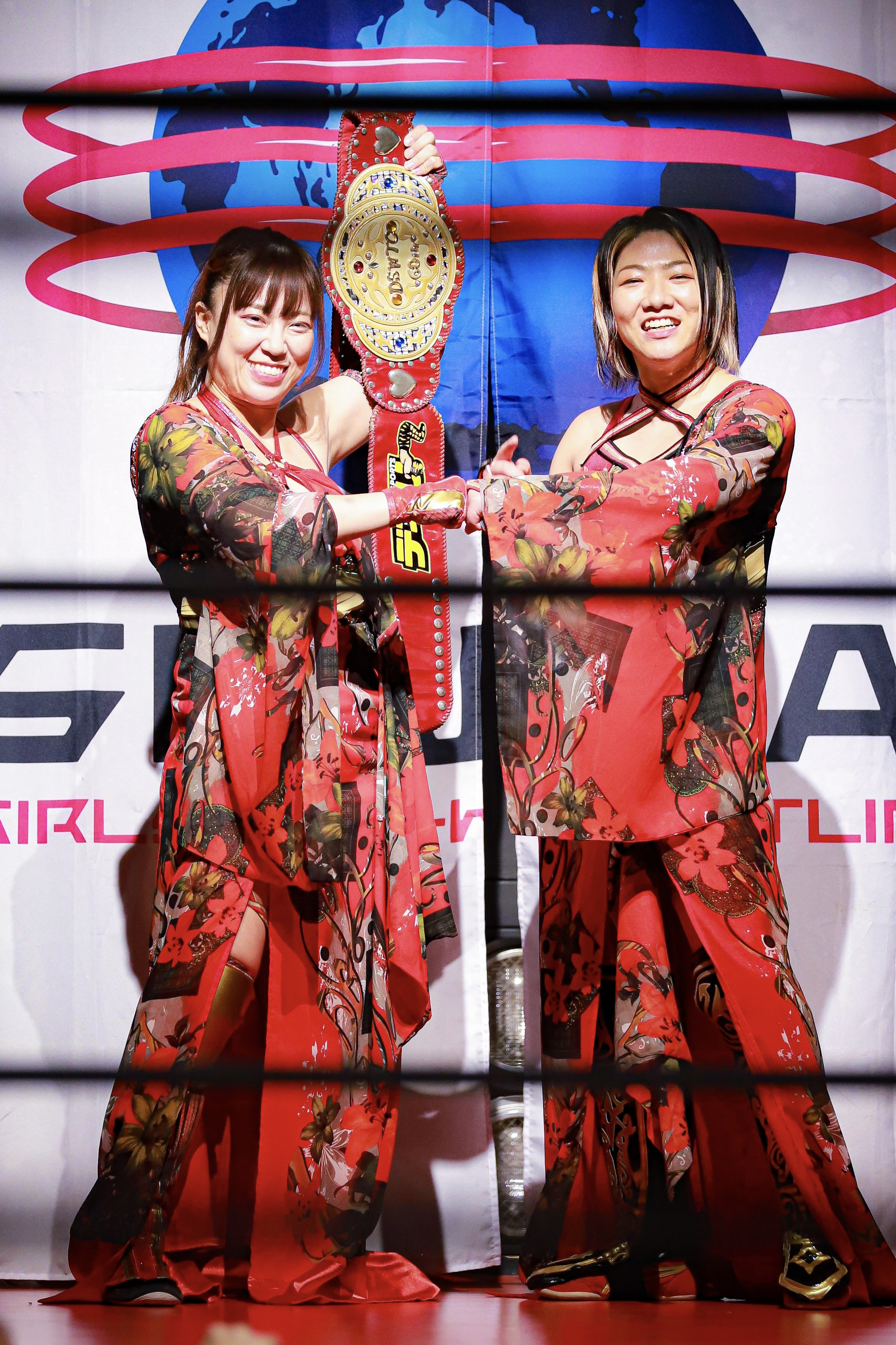
Two-time champion Miyuki Takase (left) carrying one half of the titles.

Rank	Team	No. of reigns	Combined defenses	Combined days
1	Leon	6	28	1,351
2	Hanako Nakamori	6	15	1,336
3	Command Bolshoi	4	18	1,189
4	Arisa Nakajima	3	7	619
4	Kayoko Haruyama	3	6	619
4	Tsubasa Kuragaki	3	6	619
7	Rydeen Hagane	3	7	555
8	Kazuki	4	9	478
9	Kaori Yoneyama	6	7	462
10	Moeka Haruhi	2	4	387
11	Kyoko Kimura	2	5	386
12	Rina Yamashita	1	4	384
13	Makoto	1	4	365
14	Kaho Kobayashi	1	5	314
15	Toshie Uematsu	3	7	300
16	Miyuki Takase	2	7	280
17	Dash Chisako	2	1	271
17	Sendai Sachiko	2	1	271
19	Emi Sakura	2	3	254
20	Saki	1	4	248
21	Tsukasa Fujimoto	1	3	231
22	Ray	1	4	210
23	Ayako Sato	1	2	172
24	Akari	1	2	142
24	Crea	1	2	142
26	Ran Yu-Yu	3	2	133
27	Megumi Yabushita	1	0	98
28	Aja Kong	1	1	95
28	Sachie Abe	1	1	95
30	Cherry	2	2	89
31	Chie Ozora †	1	1	84+
31	Misa Kagura †	1	1	84+
33	Keito	1	1	77
33	Yumiko Hotta	1	1	77
35	Momo Tani	1	0	76
36	Morii	1	0	70
37	Hiragi Kurumi	1	2	66
37	Mochi Natsumi	1	2	66
39	Hailey Hatred	1	0	57
40	Kakeru Sekiguchi	1	0	25
41	Yuna Manase	1	0	22
42	Azumi Hyuga	1	0	14

== See also ==
- JWP Tag Team Championship
- Women's World Tag Team Championship
