= Princess of Pro-Wrestling Championship =

Japanese professional women's wrestling championship

- Current design of the title

Details
- Promotion: JDStar; JWP Joshi Puroresu; Dream Joshi Puroresu; Pure-J (current); JTO
- Date established: June 24, 2006
- Current champion: Miria Koga
- Date won: July 21, 2024
Statistics
- First champion: Fuka
- Most reigns: Chie Ozora (3 reigns)
- Longest reign: Saori Anou (766 days)
- Shortest reign: Rydeen Hagane (1st reign, 21 days)
- Oldest champion: Chie Ozora (30 years, 169 days)
- Youngest champion: Rabbit Miu (16 years, 60 days)

The Princess of Pro-Wrestling (POP) Championship is a Japanese women's professional wrestling championship owned by the Pure-J promotion. The title was created in the JDStar promotion on June 24, 2006, when Fuka defeated Natsuki☆Head in the finals of a tournament to become the inaugural champion. On June 17, 2007, JWP Joshi Puroresu's reigning JWP Junior Champion Arisa Nakajima won the title on JDStar's second to last event. Though the two titles were not formally unified, they were defended together from this point onward. The titles remained together in JWP for nearly a decade, before it was announced on February 8, 2017 that the promotion was shutting down. As a result, the two titles were once again be separated, with the JWP title remaining with the promotion's production company, while the POP title moved on to Command Bolshoi's follow-up promotion to JWP, later named Pure-J. Between the transition from JWP to Pure-J, the former JWP roster held events under the name Dream Joshi Puroresu, where the POP title was also defended.

Like most professional wrestling championships, the title is won as a result of a scripted match. There have been a total of thirty-five reigns shared among twenty-six different wrestlers. Miria Koga is the current champion in her first reign.

== Reigns ==
As of November 3, 2026, there have been 32 reigns shared between 27 distinctive champions and two vacancies. Fuka was the inaugural champion. Arisa Nakajima, Rabbit Miu and Rydeen Hagane share the record for most reigns at two. Manami Katsu's only reign holds the record for the longest reign, at 482 days, while Hagane's first reign holds the record for the shortest reign at 21 days.

Honoka is the current champion in her first reign. She won the title by defeating Chie Ozora at Road To PURE-J 7th Anniversary Vol. 4 on July 21, 2024, in Tokyo, Japan.

== Title history ==
Key
| No. | Overall reign number |
| Reign | Reign number for the specific champion |
| Days | Number of days held |
| Defenses | Number of successful defenses |
| + | Current reign is changing daily |

| No. | Champion | Championship change | | | Reign statistics | | | Notes | Ref. |
| No. | Champion | Date | Event | Location | Reign | Days | Defenses | Notes | Ref. |
|---|---|---|---|---|---|---|---|---|---|
JDStar
| 1 | Fuka | June 24, 2006 | Future | Tokyo, Japan | 1 | 190 | 4 | Fuka defeated Natsuki☆Head in the finals of a tournament to become the inaugural champion. | |
| 2 | Natsuki☆Taiyo Natsuki | December 31, 2006 | 4th Junior All-Star Game | Tokyo, Japan | 1 | 90 | 0 | | |
| — | Vacated | March 31, 2007 | — | — | — | — | — | The Championship was vacated when Natsuki☆Taiyo fails to defend it for three months. | |
| 3 | Arisa Nakajima | June 17, 2007 | Future | Tokyo, Japan | 1 | 154 | 2 | Nakajima defeated Hiroyo Matsumoto and Yuri Urai in a three-way Dogfight tournament final to win the vacant championship. From this point onward, the title is defended alongside the JWP Junior Championship. | |
JWP Joshi Puroresu
| 4 | Tyrannosaurus Okuda | November 18, 2007 | Sendai Girls Live Vol. 14: Hardship | Sendai, Miyagi, Japan | 1 | 203 | 3 | This was a Sendai Girls' Pro Wrestling event. | |
| 5 | Arisa Nakajima | June 8, 2008 | Osaka Pure Fire!! | Osaka, Japan | 2 | 196 | 1 | | |
| 6 | Hiroyo Matsumoto | December 21, 2008 | Ibuki #26 | Tokyo, Japan | 1 | 161 | 2 | | |
| 7 | Misaki Ohata | May 31, 2009 | Ibuki #29: 4th Anniversary | Tokyo, Japan | 1 | 203 | 2 | | |
| 8 | Ryo Mizunami | December 20, 2009 | Sendai Girls Live Vol. 40 | Sendai, Miyagi, Japan | 1 | 257 | 2 | This was a Sendai Girls' Pro Wrestling event. | |
| 9 | Hiren | September 3, 2010 | Sendai Girls Live Vol. 46 | Sendai, Miyagi, Japan | 1 | 184 | 1 | This was a Sendai Girls' Pro Wrestling event. | |
| 10 | Kagetsu | March 6, 2011 | JWP Tag League the Best - Night 4 | Tokyo, Japan | 1 | 123 | 4 | | |
| 11 | Sawako Shimono | July 7, 2011 | Sendai Girls Return Home | Sendai, Miyagi, Japan | 1 | 290 | 5 | This was a Sendai Girls' Pro Wrestling event. | |
| 12 | Rabbit Miu | April 22, 2012 | JWP 20th Anniversary: Mania X | Tokyo, Japan | 1 | 246 | 3 | | |
| 13 | Manami Katsu | December 24, 2012 | Climax | Tokyo, Japan | 1 | 482 | 4 | | |
| 14 | Sareee | April 20, 2014 | Mania-X | Tokyo, Japan | 1 | 119 | 1 | | |
| 15 | Rabbit Miu | August 17, 2014 | Pure Plum | Tokyo, Japan | 2 | 231 | 5 | | |
| 16 | Rydeen Hagane | April 5, 2015 | Mania-X | Tokyo, Japan | 1 | 21 | 0 | | |
| 17 | Rina Yamashita | April 26, 2015 | Spring Hurricane in Osaka | Osaka, Japan | 1 | 105 | 0 | | |
| 18 | Kaho Kobayashi | August 9, 2015 | Happy Anniversary Wave.8: East | Tokyo, Japan | 1 | 45 | 2 | This was a Pro Wrestling Wave event. | |
| 19 | Rydeen Hagane | September 23, 2015 | Hakata Wave: bari-chiro 3 | Fukuoka, Japan | 2 | 331 | 4 | This was a Pro Wrestling Wave event. | |
| — | Vacated | August 19, 2016 | — | — | — | — | — | The championship was vacated due to Rydeen Hagane surpassing the experience limit for the junior division. | |
| 20 | Hana Kimura | September 18, 2016 | Fly High in the 25th Anniversary - Night 7 | Tokyo, Japan | 1 | 101 | 3 | Defeated Yako Fujigasaki in the finals of a four-woman tournament to win the vacant championship. | |
| 21 | Yako Fujigasaki | December 28, 2016 | Climax | Tokyo, Japan | 1 | 214 | 3 | The championship was separated from the JWP Junior Championship on April 2, 2017. | |
Pure-J
| 22 | Saori Anou | July 30, 2017 | Pure-Dream | Nagoya, Aichi, Japan | 1 | 766 | 3 | | |
| 23 | Suzu Suzuki | September 4, 2019 | Pure Princess 2 | Tokyo, Japan | 1 | 466 | 0 | Suzuki was voted by the audience as MVP of the card and was awarded the championship. | |
| — | Vacated | December 13, 2020 | Climax | Tokyo, Japan | — | — | — | Suzu Suzuki vacated the championship. | |
| 24 | Akari | February 7, 2021 | Fight Together | Tokyo, Japan | 1 | 441 | 7 | Defeated Momo Tani in the tournament finals to win the vacant championship. | |
| 25 | Haruka Umesaki | April 24, 2022 | Pure-J Rainbow Tiger Series Vol. 6 | Tokyo, Japan | 1 | 109 | 2 | | |
| 26 | Crea | August 11, 2022 | Pure-J Rainbow Mountain 2022 | Tokyo, Japan | 1 | 129 | 3 | | |
| 27 | Riko Kaiju | December 18, 2022 | Pure-J Climax 2022 | Tokyo, Japan | 1 | 119 | 2 | | |
| 28 | Chie Ozora | April 16, 2023 | Pure-J Maniax 2023 | Tokyo, Japan | 1 | 105 | 4 | | |
| — | Vacated | July 30, 2023 | — | — | — | — | — | Ozora vacated the championship after suffering a knee injury. | |
| 29 | Chie Ozora | September 23, 2023 | PURE-J PURE-SLAM DUNK Vol. 2 | Tokyo, Japan | 2 | 16 | 0 | Defeated Kizuna Tanaka to win the vacant title. | |
Pure-J/JTO
| 30 | Misa Kagura | October 9, 2023 | PURE-J PURE-SLAM DUNK Vol. 3 | Tokyo, Japan | 1 | 45 | 0 | | |
| 32 | Sumika Yanagawa | November 23, 2023 | JTO Sumika Yanagawa Triumphant Return | Yamagata, Japan | 1 | 157 | 3 | | |
Pure-J
| 33 | Chie Ozora | April 28, 2024 | Pure-J Maniax 2023 | Tokyo, Japan | 3 | 84 | 2 | | |
| 34 | Honoka | July 21, 2024 | Road To PURE-J 7th Anniversary Vol. 4 | Tokyo, Japan | 1 | 755 | 6 | | |
| 35 | Miria Koga | August 15, 2026 | WAVE Yumi Ohka 25th Anniversary | Tokyo, Japan | 1 | 80+ | 1 | This was a Pro Wrestling Wave event. | |

== Combined reigns ==
As of November 3, 2026

| † | Indicates the current champions |

| Rank | Wrestler | No. of reigns | Combined defenses | Combined days |
|---|---|---|---|---|
| 1 | Saori Anou | 1 | 3 | 766 |
| 2 | Honoka | 1 | 6 | 755 |
| 3 | Manami Katsu | 1 | 4 | 482 |
| 4 | Rabbit Miu | 2 | 8 | 477 |
| 5 | Suzu Suzuki | 1 | 0 | 466 |
| 6 | Akari | 1 | 7 | 441 |
| 7 | Rydeen Hagane | 2 | 4 | 352 |
| 8 | Arisa Nakajima | 2 | 3 | 350 |
| 9 | Sawako Shimono | 1 | 5 | 280 |
| 10 | Ryo Mizunami | 1 | 2 | 257 |
| 11 | Yako Fujigasaki | 1 | 3 | 214 |
| 12 | Chie Ozora | 3 | 6 | 205 |
| 13 | Misaki Ohata | 1 | 2 | 203 |
| 13 | Tyrannosaurus Okuda | 1 | 3 | 203 |
| 15 | Fuka | 1 | 4 | 190 |
| 16 | Hiren | 1 | 1 | 184 |
| 17 | Hiroyo Matsumoto | 1 | 2 | 161 |
| 18 | Sumika Yanagawa | 1 | 3 | 157 |
| 19 | Kagetsu | 1 | 4 | 133 |
| 20 | Crea | 1 | 3 | 129 |
| 21 | Riko Kaiju | 1 | 2 | 119 |
| 21 | Sareee | 1 | 1 | 119 |
| 23 | Haruka Umesaki | 1 | 2 | 109 |
| 24 | Rina Yamashita | 1 | 0 | 105 |
| 25 | Hana Kimura | 1 | 3 | 101 |
| 26 | Natsuki☆Taiyo Natsuki | 1 | 0 | 90 |
| 27 | Miria Koga † | 1 | 1 | 80+ |
| 28 | Kaho Kobayashi | 1 | 2 | 45 |
| 28 | Misa Kagura | 1 | 0 | 45 |
