= Pure-J =

Women's professional wrestling promotion

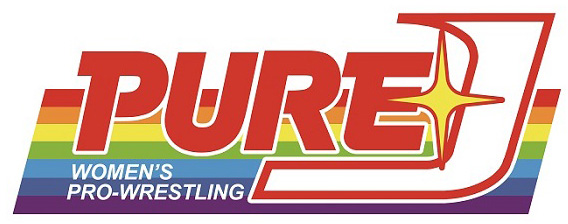
- Founded: August 11, 2017
- Style: Joshi puroresu
- Headquarters: Tokyo, Japan
- Founder: Command Bolshoi
- Predecessor: JWP Joshi Puroresu
- Website: pure-j.jp

Pure-J (ピュアＪ, Pyua J) is a Japanese Joshi puroresu (women's professional wrestling) promotion established on August 11, 2017, by Command Bolshoi.

== History ==
With the closure of JWP Joshi Puroresu on April 2, 2017, it was announced that Command Bolshoi will be in charge of a new promotion Pure-J. It was also confirmed that Pure-J would retain control of the Daily Sports Women's Tag Team and Princess of Pro-Wrestling Championships. Pure-J held it first event on August 11, 2017.

On October 9, 2017, Pure-J crowned their first Openweight Champion, Hanako Nakamori, where Nakamori defeated Manami Katsu in the finals of a 12-woman tournament to become the inaugural champion. Since then, there have been 7 reigns, with Leon being the current champion in her second reign.

On April 21, 2019, Bolshoi held her retirement show from professional wrestling, where she participated in a gauntlet match that ended in time limit draw.

On May 27, 2020, it was announced that Pure-J had joined Independent Wrestling TV (IWTV), a streaming company which airs independent promotions shows.

== Roster ==
=== Wrestlers ===
Ring name	Real name	Notes
Akari	Bemita Elgueta Saldias	
Chesca	Unknown	
Chie Ozora	Chiemi Shioya	
Crea	Tsukada Kurea	
Flying Penguin	Unknown	KSR Champion; 2point5 Joshi Pro-Wrestling
Hanako Nakamori	Hanako Kobayashi	Daily Sports Women's Tag Team Champion; Pure-J Openweight Champion
Honoka	Unknown	Princess of Pro Wrestling Champion; Pro Wrestling Wave
Jenne	Unknown	
Kaho Kobayashi	Kaho Kobayashi	Daily Sports Women's Tag Team Champion; Freelancer
Kazuki	Kazuko Fujiwara	
Leon	Rena Takase	
Momo Tani	Unknown	
Rydeen Hagane	Noriko Matsumoto	
Saki	Saki Watanabe	Girl's Pro-Wrestling Unit Color's

=== Officials ===
Ring name	Real name	Notes
Command Bolshoi	Unknown	Owner
Saki	Saki Tsuda	Ring announcer
Tessy Sugo	Hiromi Sugo	Referee

=== Notable alumni ===
- Akino
- Alex Lee
- Alexander Otsuka
- Aoi Kizuki
- Ayako Hamada
- Ayako Sato
- Azumi Hyuga
- Chikayo Nagashima
- Emi Sakura
- Giulia
- Hana Kimura
- Hikari Shimizu
- Hikaru Shida
- Hiroyo Matsumoto
- Kagetsu
- Kakeru Sekiguchi
- Kyoko Inoue
- Manami Katsu
- Manami Toyota
- Mari Apache
- Mari Manji
- Mariko Yoshida
- Mayumi Ozaki
- Mika Iwata
- Mio Momono
- Miyuki Takase
- Mikami
- Megumi Yabushita
- Meiko Satomura
- Nagisa Nozaki
- Ricky Fuji
- Riko Kaiju
- Riho
- Rina Shingaki
- Rin Kadokura
- Sachie Abe
- Saki
- Saori Anou
- Sareee
- Sawako Shimono
- Suzu Suzuki
- Takako Inoue
- Tam Nakano
- Tae Honma
- Totoro Satsuki
- Tsubasa Kuragaki
- Waka Tsukiyama
- Yako Fujigasaki
- Yuu
- Yumiko Hotta

=== Backstage personnel ===
Ring name	Real name	Notes
Command Bolshoi	Unknown	Owner and promoter of Pure-J
Saki Tsuda	Unknown	Ring Announcer

== Championships ==
As of October 30, 2026.

Championship	Current champion(s)	Reign	Date won	Days held	Location	Notes
Pure-J Openweight Championship	Hanako Nakamori	6	January 4, 2026	299+	Tokyo, Japan	Defeated Saki at PURE-J 2026 First Battle.
Princess of Pro Wrestling Championship	Miria Koga	1	August 15, 2026	76+	Tokyo, Japan	Defeated Honoka at WAVE Yumi Ohka 25th Anniversary.
Daily Sports Women's Tag Team Championship	Princess Blaze (Chie Ozora and Misa Kagura)	1 (1, 1)	August 11, 2026	80+	Tokyo, Japan	Defeated The Star of Middle Age (Kaori Yoneyama and Kazuki) at PURE-J 9th Anniversary.
KSR Championship	Flying Penguin	1	January 19, 2025	649+	Osaka, Japan	Defeated Momo Tani at Pure-J Osaka Festival 2025 ~ Winter Battle.
