= Leon (Japanese wrestler) =

Japanese professional wrestler (born 1980)

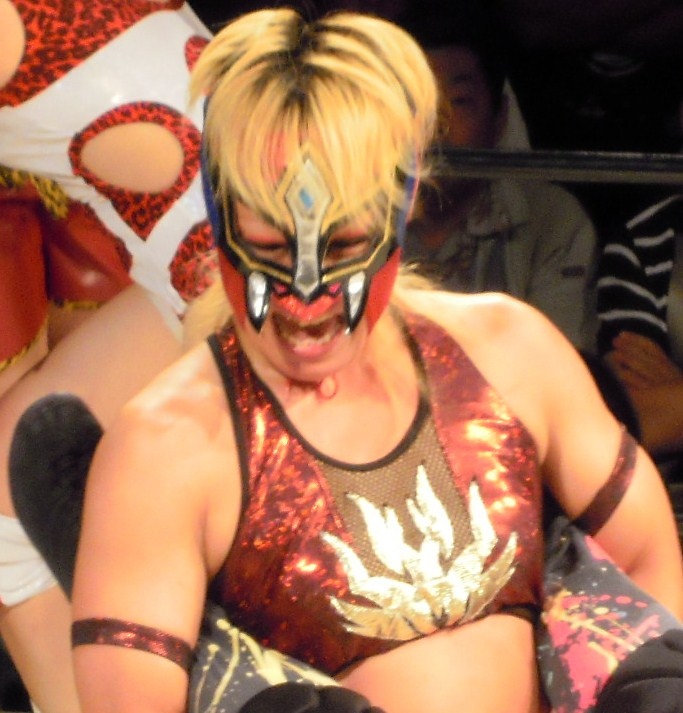
- Leon in August 2010

Personal information
- Born: Rena Takase; July 2, 1980 (age 46) Namerikawa, Toyama

Professional wrestling career
- Ring name(s): Haruyamaki Leon; Hinata; Leon; León; Leo-na; Leon Haruyama; Leon Santa; Rena Takase; Tiger Leon; Tigers Mask Lady; Toujyuki Leon
- Billed height: 1.60 m (5 ft 3 in)
- Billed weight: 66 kg (146 lb)
- Trained by: Rie Tamada
- Debut: March 15, 2000

Rena Takase (高瀬 玲奈, Takase Rena; born February 26, 1981) is a Japanese professional wrestler, better known by the ring name Leon. Trained by Hyper Visual Fighting Arsion, Takase made her debut for the promotion in March 2000, working under her real name. After a change in management, Arsion was renamed Major Girl's Fighting AtoZ in 2003, and Takase received a new ring name, Leo-na (玲央奈, Reiōna). After quitting AtoZ in 2005, Takase became a freelancer, now working under a mask and the new ring name Toujyuki Leon (闘獣牙Leon, Tōjūki Leon). After two years of working for several independent promotions, including JDStar, M's Style and Oz Academy, Takase made JWP Joshi Puroresu her new home promotion in January 2007. In January 2010, Takase's ring name was shortened to just Leon and the following year, she won JWP's top title, the JWP Openweight Championship, while also becoming the leader of the Shishi no Ana stable. Takase remained with JWP until the promotion's folding in April 2017.

== Professional wrestling career ==
=== Arsion and AtoZ (1999–2005) ===
In January 1999, Takase, with a sports background in judo, passed an audition held by Hyper Visual Fighting Arsion and began training professional wrestling at the promotion's dojo. She made her debut under her real name on March 15, 2000, facing Ai Fujita in a losing effort. Takase started her career with a sixty match losing streak, before picking up her first win over Linda Starr on November 19, 2000. Through Arsion's working relationship with All Japan Women's Pro-Wrestling (AJW), Takase also made appearances for the promotion, where she went on to win her first championship, when she defeated fellow Arsion worker Mika Nishio for the AJW Junior Championship on December 22, 2002. Takase would eventually go into history as the final AJW Junior Champion, holding the title until AJW folded in April 2005. In June 2003, Yumiko Hotta took over Arsion and renamed the promotion Major Girl's Fighting AtoZ. Takase, adopting the new ring name Leo-na, worked regularly for the promotion for the next two years, before quitting and becoming a freelancer in February 2005.

=== Freelancing (2005–2007) ===
After leaving AtoZ, Takase began wrestling under a mask and adopted the new persona Toujyuki Leon. Her first appearance under the new character, took place on February 11, 2005, when she was defeated by Akino at a JDStar event. On February 20, Toujyuki Leon made her debut for JWP Joshi Puroresu, losing to Tsubasa Kuragaki. She returned to the promotion on April 24, when she teamed with Kaori Yoneyama to defeat Eco and Kazuki to become the number one contenders to the JWP Tag Team Championship. On May 15, Toujyuki Leon and Yoneyama defeated Akino and Tsubasa Kuragaki to become the new JWP Tag Team Champions. For most of 2005, Toujyuki Leon for the M's Style promotion, where she defeated Ayako Hamada on April 24 to win the Tournament of Style, while also making it to the finals of a one night tag team tournament on August 7, teaming with noki-A. On December 4, Toujyuki Leon defeated Hikaru in the finals of a seven-woman tournament to win the Next Shining Generation (NSG) Championship, an independent title with no official home promotion. She would hold the title for four months, before losing it to Hikaru on April 2, 2006. After a fifteen-month reign, Toujyuki Leon and Kaori Yoneyama lost the JWP Tag Team Championship to Ran Yu-Yu and Toshie Uematsu on August 6, 2006. During 2006, Toujyuki Leon also made several appearances for the Ibuki and Oz Academy promotions.

=== JWP Joshi Puroresu (2007–2017) ===
On January 14, 2007, Toujyuki Leon returned to JWP, wrestling Kaori Yoneyama to a time limit draw. After the match, she announced that she was officially signing with JWP, ending her freelancing days. On March 21, Toujyuki Leon picked up her biggest win in JWP, defeating promotion founder Command Bolshoi in a singles match. On June 10, Toujyuki Leon reunited with Kaori Yoneyama in an attempt to regain the JWP Tag Team Championship in a gauntlet match. After eliminating Aoi Kizuki and Manami Toyota, Command Bolshoi and Kazuki, and Arisa Nakajima and Sachie Abe from the match, Toujyuki Leon and Yoneyama were themselves eliminated by the eventual winners of the entire match, Kazuki and Sachie Abe. During the rest of the year, Toujyuki Leon and Yoneyama faced each other in two more singles matches, the first on July 22 ended in another time limit draw, and in the second match on October 21, Yoneyama pinned her former tag team partner for the win. After picking up another big win over Command Bolshoi on December 9 at the year-end JWP-Climax 2007 event, Toujyuki Leon's year ended with her being given the JWP Technique Award. On June 22, 2008, Toujyuki Leon and Yoneyama defeated Arisa Nakajima and Kana to once again become the number contenders to the JWP Tag Team Championship. They would, however, fail in their title challenge against Kayoko Haruyama and Tsubasa Kuragaki on July 11. On November 24, Toujyuki Leon entered a tournament to determine the number one contender to JWP's top title, the JWP Openweight Championship. On December 7, Toujyuki Leon defeated Azumi Hyuga in the finals to win the tournament. She would receive her shot at the JWP Openweight Championship on December 28 at JWP-Climax 2008, but was defeated by the defending champion, Kayoko Haruyama. Despite another year without championships, Toujyuki Leon was awarded the Fighting Spirit award at the end of the year.

On January 25, 2009, Toujyuki Leon was finally able to defeat Kaori Yoneyama in a singles match, pinning her with the Captured Buster. On February 8, Toujyuki Leon and new tag team partner Arisa Nakajima defeated Kazuki and Sachie Abe to become the number one contenders to the Daily Sports Women's and JWP Tag Team Championships. They would receive their shot at the titles on February 21, but were defeated by Keito and Yumiko Hotta. On April 19, Toujyuki Leon defeated visiting freelancer Ayumi Kurihara in a high-profile singles match. On September 6, Toujyuki Leon and Kaori Yoneyama faced each other in yet another singles match, this time to determine the number one contender to the JWP Openweight Championship. Yoneyama would go on to win the match, avenging her loss the previous January. The following month, Toujyuki Leon got involved in a storyline, where she aligned herself with other JWP wrestlers to defend the promotion against members of the NEO Japan Ladies Pro-Wrestling-based Passion Red stable. One notable match in the storyline saw Toujyuki Leon defeat Passion Ray in a singles match on December 13 at JWP-Climax 2009. On January 10, 2010, Toujyuki Leon announced that she was shortening her ring name to just Leon, before defeating Passion Hotty in a singles match. On June 13, Leon wrestled her tenth anniversary match, where she and Kaori Yoneyama defeated Aja Kong and Akino. On September 26, Leon formed the Shishi no Ana ("Lion's Hole") stable with Basara and Misaki Ohata. On October 27, Leon represented JWP in Sendai Girls' Pro Wrestling's Joshi Puroresu Dantai Taikou Flash tournament, a single-elimination tournament, where different joshi promotions battled each other. In their first round match, Team JWP, which also included Command Bolshoi, Hanako Nakamori, Kaori Yoneyama and Kayoko Haruyama, defeated Team Pro Wrestling Wave, which included Gami, Moeka Haruhi, Shuu Shibutani, Toshie Uematsu and Yumi Ohka. The semifinals of the tournament were contested in six woman tag team formats, which led to Leon being sidelined from the match, where JWP representatives Kayako Haruyama, Nana Kawasa and Tsubasa Kuragaki were eliminated by Team Sendai Girls' Hiren, Kagetsu and Meiko Satomura. On November 27, Leon took part in an independent event produced by Passion Red, where she defeated Natsuki☆Taiyo to win the NEO High Speed Championship, her first title in four years. When NEO Japan Ladies Pro Wrestling folded the following month, the title was renamed the High Speed Championship.

On January 28, 2011, Leon entered the 2011 Tag League the Best with her "Shishi no Ana" stablemate Misaki Ohata. The team eventually made it to the finals of the tournament, where they were defeated by Kayoko Haruyama and Tsubasa Kuragaki on March 6. That same day, Hanako Nakamori joined Shishi no Ana, replacing Basara who had been sidelined with an injury. On March 21, Shishi no Ana promoted their own independent event, which saw Leon make her first defense of the High Speed Championship, defeating Misaki Ohata in the main event. On April 3, Leon put the championship on the line in a title vs. title match against JWP Openweight Champion Kaori Yoneyama. Leon went on to win the match to retain the High Speed Championship and become the new JWP Openweight Champion. The match was later named JWP's best match of the year. In May, Leon entered the 2011 J-1 Grand Prix tournament. During the first two rounds, Leon defeated Ray and Dash Chisako, both times successfully defending the High Speed Championship in the process. On June 12, Leon defeated Shishi no Ana stablemate Hanako Nakamori in the semifinals of the tournament, making her first successful defense of the JWP Openweight Championship in the process. The finals of the tournament took place on June 26 and saw Leon put the JWP Openweight Championship on the line, while her opponent Hailey Hatred put her TLW World Women's and IMW Hybrid Fighting Championships on the line. Hatred went on to win the match to win the 2011 J-1 Grand Prix, retain her two titles and win the JWP Openweight Championship, ending Leon's reign at 84 days. On July 24, Leon made an appearance for the World Wonder Ring Stardom promotion, losing the High Speed Championship back to Natsuki☆Taiyo. On October 20, the Shishi no Ana stable was renamed Labradorite. In January 2012, Leon entered the 2012 Tag League the Best, teaming with former Passion Red rival and High Speed Championship challenger Ray as Mascara Voladoras (Spanish for the "Masked [Female] Flyers"). The partnership also led to Leon making an appearance for Ray's home promotion Ice Ribbon on January 25, wrestling in a tag team match, where she and Ray defeated Sayaka Obihiro and Tsukasa Fujimoto. On March 4, the round-robin stage of the Tag League the Best pitted Mascara Voladoras against Leon's Labradorite stablemates Hanako Nakamori and Misaki Ohata. Nakamori won the match for her team by pinning Leon. When the round-robin portion of the tournament concluded on March 25, Mascara Voladoras finished with two wins, a draw and a loss and failed to advance to the finals of the tournament. Following the tournament, Leon and Ray were given the first shot at the new champions, Ran Yu-Yu and Toshie Uematsu, but failed in their title challenge on April 22. On May 31, Labradorite held a press conference to announce that Nakamori and Ohata had "graduated" and would be leaving the group following August 12, with anna, Maki Narumiya and Mika Iida joining Leon as their replacements. On September 9, Mascara Voladoras received another shot at the JWP Tag Team and Daily Sports Women's Tag Team Championships, but were this time defeated by Arisa Nakajima and Command Bolshoi.

On October 28, after Heart Move Kei Reform (HMK) member Emi Sakura had captured the JWP Openweight Championship, Leon, along with Arisa Nakajima, entered the ring to make a challenge for the title. On November 4, Leon and Nakajima defeated Sakura and her HMK stablemate Kaori Yoneyama in a tag team match, with Leon pinning Yoneyama for the win. On November 11, Leon entered a four-woman tournament to determine the number one contender to the JWP Openweight Championship, but was defeated in her first round match by HMK member Hanako Nakamori. On January 13, 2013, Leon entered another tournament in an attempt to earn the first shot at new JWP Openweight Champion, Arisa Nakajima. In her opening match, Leon was victorious over JWP Tag Team and Daily Sports Women's Tag Team Champion Tsubasa Kuragaki. The following day, after receiving a bye in the second round, Leon returned to the tournament in the semifinals, defeating JWP Junior and Princess of Pro-Wrestling Champion Manami Katsu. However, later that same day, Leon was defeated in the finals of the tournament by Kayoko Haruyama. On November 24, Leon reunited with Ray to enter a tournament for the vacant JWP and Daily Sports Women's Tag Team Championships, defeating Kayoko Haruyama and Manami Katsu in their first round match. Leon and Ray were defeated in the finals of the tournament on December 15 by Dash Chisako and Sendai Sachiko. From January 19 to March 2, Leon and Ray took part in JWP's 2014 Tag League the Best. After two wins, the team went into the final day of the round-robin portion of the tournament leading their block, but a loss to Kayoko Haruyama and Manami Katsu cost them their spot in the finals. However, when Katsu suffered an ankle injury, Leon and Ray were given her and Haruyama's spot in the finals of the tournament. On March 16, Mascara Voladoras were defeated in the finals of the tournament by Haruusagi (Rabbit Miu and Tsukushi). After pinning JWP Openweight Champion Arisa Nakajima first in a six-woman tag team match on August 17 and then in a tag team match on August 24, Leon was granted a shot at her title, but was defeated in the title match on September 15. On December 28, Leon and Ray, the team now renamed Voladoras L×R, defeated Wild Snufkin (Command Bolshoi and Kyoko Kimura) to win the JWP Tag Team and Daily Sports Women's Tag Team Championships. They made successful title defenses against Dash Chisako and Sendai Sachiko on April 5, the winners of the 2015 Tag League the Best, Aoi Kizuki and Kayoko Haruyama, on April 19, Kazuki and Megumi Yabushita on May 3, and Rabbit Miu and Rydeen Hagane on July 11. Their reign ended in their fifth defense against Dash Chisako and Sendai Sachiko on July 26. On January 9, 2017, Leon and Command Bolshoi defeated Hanako Nakamori and Kyoko Kimura to win the Daily Sports Women's Tag Team and JWP Tag Team Championships.

On February 8, it was announced that JWP would be folding on April 2, after which all of its wrestlers, Leon included, would become freelancers. At JWP's final show, Leon and Bolshoi successfully defended the Daily Sports Women's Tag Team and JWP Tag Team Championships against Kazuki and Rydeen Hagane. Afterwards, the JWP title was retired, while the Daily Sports title moves on to Bolshoi's new promotion, Pure-J, with the champions.

=== Reina (2011–present) ===
On August 27, 2011, Leon made her debut for the Universal Woman's Pro Wrestling Reina promotion with a win over Lady Afrodita. During the following months, Leon continued working for Reina, remaining undefeated in singles matches. On July 16, 2012, Leon made her debut for Universal Woman's Pro Wrestling Reina's follow-up promotion, Reina X World, teaming with Crazy Star in a tag team match, where they were defeated by Alex Lee and Manami Katsu. On August 26, Leon entered a four-woman tournament to determine the inaugural Reina-CMLL International Champion. After picking up a win over Alex Lee in her first round match, Leon defeated Tiffany in the finals of the tournament to become the inaugural champion. At the following event on September 23, Leon defeated CMLL-Reina International Junior Champion Silueta in a Two Out of Three Falls match. On October 10, Leon made her first trip to Mexico to work for Consejo Mundial de Lucha Libre (CMLL), with which Reina X World has a working relationship. Leon, billed as "León", wrestled her first match for CMLL on the October 12 Super Viernes show in Arena México in Mexico City, losing the Reina-CMLL International Championship to La Amapola in her first defense. Two days later, in her second Arena México match, León teamed with Goya Kong and Marcela in a six-woman tag team match, where they defeated Mima Shimoda, La Seductora and Zeuxis. The day after that in Puebla, León, Dark Angel and Lady Afrodita were defeated in a six-woman tag team match by La Amapola, Mima Shimoda and Princesa Blanca. On October 16, Léon returned to Arena México for her fourth and final match of the tour, another six woman tag team match, where she, Dalys la Caribeña and Silueta were defeated by La Comandante, La Seductora and Princesa Sujei. On November 25, Leon defeated La Amapola back in Japan to regain the Reina-CMLL International Championship. Leon made her first successful title defense on February 10, 2013, defeating Sachie Abe at a JWP event. Her second successful defense took place at an event held by the newly rebranded Reina Joshi Puroresu, where she defeated CMLL representative Estrellita. On July 20, Leon lost the title to Command Bolshoi at a JWP event. On August 24, Leon teamed with JWP rookie Rydeen Hagane, a replacement for an injured Ray, in a tournament for the vacant Reina World Tag Team Championship, with the two defeating Makoto and Miyako Matsumoto in their first round match. On September 8, they were defeated in the finals of the tournament by La Vaquerita and Zeuxis. On December 22, Leon and Ray defeated Aki Shizuku and Ariya to win the Reina World Tag Team Championship. Leon and Ray vacated the title on March 28, 2014.

=== Shimmer Women Athletes (2012, 2014) ===
On February 27, 2012, Shimmer Women Athletes announced that Leon would be making her American debut for the promotion on March 17. In her debut match on Volume 45, Leon was defeated by Sara Del Rey. Later that same day on Volume 46, Leon teamed with Ray to defeat Davina Rose and Mia Yim in a tag team match. The following day on Volume 47, Leon and Ray unsuccessfully challenged Ayako Hamada and Ayumi Kurihara for the Shimmer Tag Team Championship. Later on Volume 48, Leon defeated LuFisto in her final match of the weekend.

Leon and Ray returned to Shimmer on April 12, 2014, defeating The Canadian NINJAs (Nicole Matthews and Portia Perez) as part of Volume 63 and unsuccessfully challenging the Global Green Gangsters (Kellie Skater and Tomoka Nakagawa) for the Shimmer Tag Team Championship later that same night on Volume 64. The following day, Leon and Ray defeated Cherry Bomb and Kimber Lee on Volume 65, before Leon was defeated by Kay Lee Ray in a four-way match, which also included Kimber Lee and Nevaeh, on Volume 66.

=== Pure-J (2017–present) ===
Before the official launch of Pure-J on August 11, 2017, the former JWP roster presented shows under the name "Pure-Dream Presents Dream Joshi Puroresu". Leon and Bolshoi continued defending the Daily Sports Women's Tag Team Championship at these shows. During these shows, the two also named their team "P-Ray-L", in reference to Leon's former tag team partner Ray, who was battling cancer. The name, which includes the letters "P" and "L" for "Piko" and "Leon", was also a play on the word "prayer". At Pure-J's inaugural event on August 11, Leon defeated Mariko Yoshida.

== Championships and accomplishments ==
- All Japan Women's Pro-Wrestling
  - AJW Junior Championship (1 time)
- Ice Ribbon
  - International Ribbon Tag Team Championship (1 time) – with Neko Nitta
- JWP Joshi Puroresu
  - Daily Sports Women's Tag Team Championship (5 times, current) – with Command Bolshoi (1), Ray (1), Cherry (1) and Miyuki Takase (2)
  - JWP Openweight Championship (1 time)
  - JWP Tag Team Championship (3 times) – with Command Bolshoi (1), Kaori Yoneyama (1) and Ray (1)
  - JWP Openweight Championship Contendership Tournament (2008)
  - JWP Year-End Award (4 times)
    - Best Bout Award (2011) vs. Kaori Yoneyama on April 3
    - Best Bout Award (2014) vs. Arisa Nakajima on September 15
    - Fighting Spirit Award (2008)
    - Technique Award (2007)
- M's Style
  - Tournament of Style (2005)
- Pure-J
  - Daily Sports Women's Tag Team Championship (5 times) – with Cherry (1), Command Bolshoi (1), Ray (1) and Miyuki Takase (2)
  - Pure-J Openweight Championship (3 times)
  - Pure-J Year-End Award (1 time)
    - Best Bout Award (2019) vs. Hanako Nakamori on April 21
- Reina X World / Reina Joshi Puroresu
  - Reina-CMLL International Championship (2 times)
  - Reina World Tag Team Championship (1 time) – with Ray
  - Reina-CMLL International Championship Tournament (2012)
- Other titles
  - High Speed Championship (1 time)
  - Next Shining Generation Championship (1 time)
- World Woman Pro-Wrestling Diana
  - WWWD Queen Elizabeth Championship (1 time)
