= Kaho Kobayashi =

Japanese professional wrestler

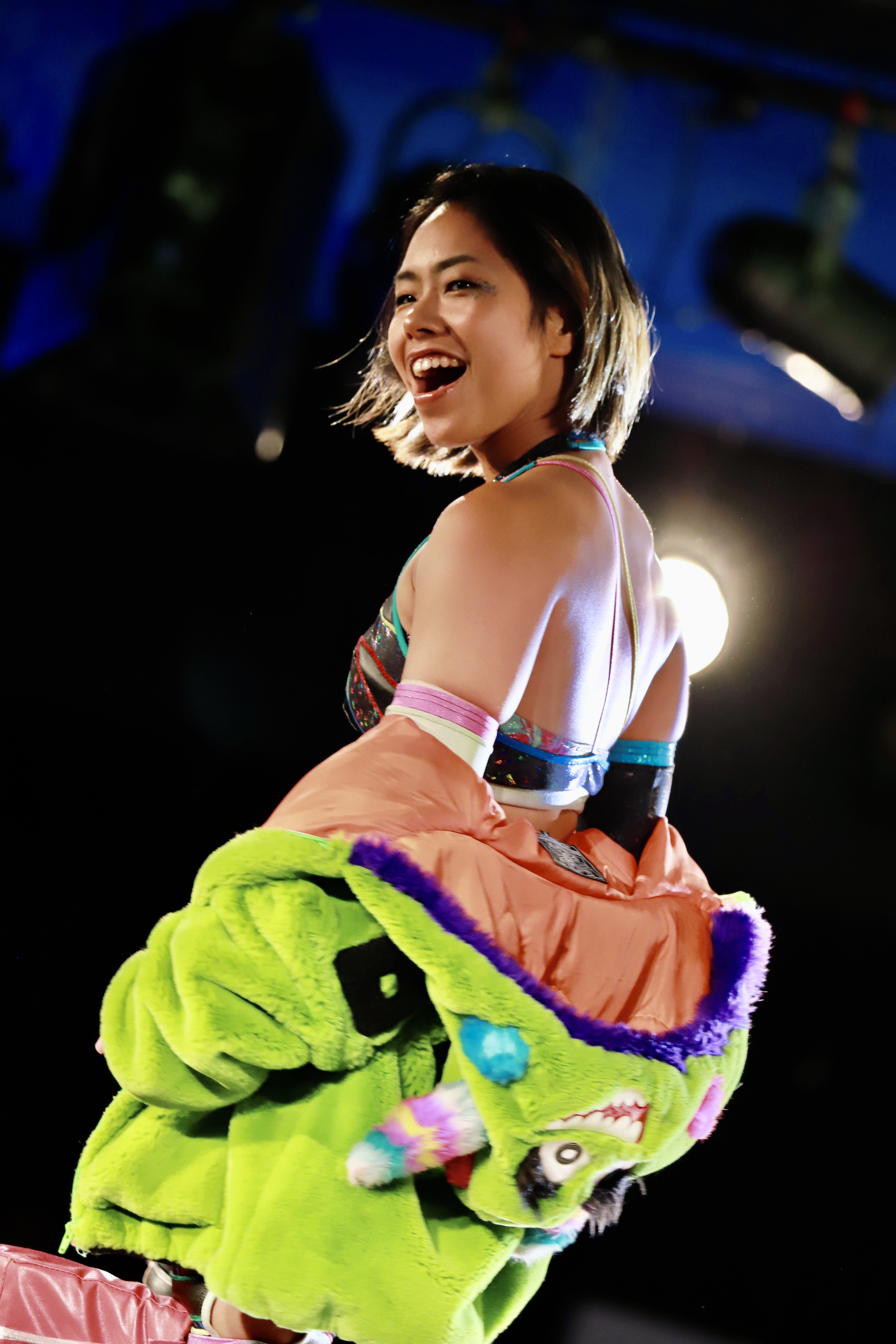
- Kobayashi in September 2020

Personal information
- Born: Kaho Kobayashi (小林 香萌, Kobayashi Kaho); May 12, 1992 (age 34) Kasukabe, Saitama, Japan

Professional wrestling career
- Ring name: Kaho Kobayashi
- Billed height: 152 cm (5 ft 0 in)
- Billed weight: 53 kg (117 lb)
- Trained by: Yoshihiro Tajiri; Makoto
- Debut: June 28, 2013

Kaho Kobayashi (小林 香萌, Kobayashi Kaho; born May 12, 1992) is a Japanese professional wrestler currently working as a freelancer.

Kobayashi was trained by Yoshihiro Tajiri and Makoto, making her debut in June 2013 for Wrestling New Classic. Since debuting, she has worked extensively for Pro Wrestling Wave, OZ Academy, JWP Joshi Puroresu, Ice Ribbon and Seadlinnng. She is also known for her work in Mexico, where she has competed regularly for Consejo Mundial de Lucha Libre (CMLL) since 2018, before returning to Japan in 2019.

== Professional wrestling career ==
=== Wrestling New Classic (2013–2014) ===
Kobayashi entered the Wrestling New Classic dojo in May 2012 with a background in gymnastics and breakdancing. Trained by Yoshihiro Tajiri and Makoto, she competed in exhibitions against fellow Tajiri trainee Yusuke Kodama before making her proper debut in June 2013, losing to Lin Byron. During the early days of her career, she split her time between WNC and numerous all female promotions such as Ice Ribbon, Reina and Diana, unsuccessfully challenging Sareee for the JWP Junior and Princess of Pro-Wrestling Championships at a Diana show in July 2014.

=== Freelancing (2014–2018) ===
After WNC closed its doors in 2014, she also began working for Pro Wrestling Wave, where she entered the 2014 Catch the Wave Young Block, eventually winning the tournament by defeating Sumire Natsu in the final. Kobayashi also debuted for OZ Academy in late 2014 and immediately formed an alliance with Kagetsu as "Mission K4", with Sonoko Kato and Akino joining their ranks shortly after. Mission K4 won the OZ Academy Tag Team Championship on March 1, 2015, beating Mayumi Ozaki and Sakura Hirota at Forgiveness. They held on to the belts until July, when they lost to Ozaki and Mio Shirai at 2Bad, but regained them one month later in a rematch. Primarily splitting her time between OZ and Wave, Kobayashi won the JWP Junior/Princess of Pro Wrestling Championship in August 2015, beating Rina Yamashita. After successful defences against Yako Fujigasaki and Akane Fujita, she dropped the title to Rydeen Hagane in September. In October, she wrestled a big match for the Asuka Project promotion, facing male wrestler Kenichiro Arai in an intergender match for the Asuka Project Championship where she was defeated. In December, she partnered up with Rina Yamashita for Wave's Young Oh! Oh! Tag Team Tournament. Their team was successful and they reached the final on December 25, where they lost to Meiko Tanaka and Sareee.

In January 2017, she partnered up with Sareee to challenge for the World Woman Pro Wrestling Diana Tag Team Championship, where they lost to Crysis (Chikayo Nagashima and Megumi Yabashita). In June 2017, she revived Mission K4, this time with Akino as her partner, and the two won the OZ Academy Tag Team Championship, beating Hikaru Shida and Syuri at Voyager. Whilst already holding the OZ Academy tag belts, she also won Wave's Tag Team Championship with Hiroe Nagahama in August. In September, she defeated La Jarochita to win the CMLL-Reina International Junior Heavyweight Championship, making her a triple champion. Her days with three belts would be short, as she lost the Wave Tag Team Championship to Rin Kadokura and Takumi Iroha on September 17. Additionally, she and Akino dropped the OZ Academy Tag Team Championship to Mayumi Ozaki and Maya Yukihi in October.

=== Mexico (2018–2019) ===
In January 2018, Kobayashi made her first expedition to Mexico, where she would be competing for Consejo Mundial de Lucha Libre (CMLL). She spent the majority of her first run in tag team matches, primarily teaming with Princesa Sugehit. In her farewell match before returning to Japan, she unsuccessfully challenged Dalys la Caribeña for the CMLL World Women's Championship.

Kobayashi returned to Japan in May, where she partnered up with Makoto for the Ultra777 U21 Tag Team Tournament. They eliminated Hamuko Hoshi and Ibuki Hoshi in the first round, but lost to Yoshiko and Rina Yamashita in the semi-finals. In July, by virtue of defeating Tsubasa Kuragaki, she was entered into a 6 way number one contenders match for the OZ Academy Openweight Championship in August. After a gruelling 50 minute long match where she eliminated Sonoko Kato and Mayumi Ozaki, Kobayashi was finally defeated by Aja Kong and narrowly missed the chance to become #1 contender. She was scheduled to return to Mexico in September, but announced via Twitter that she had suffered a dislocation and internal ligament peeling in her knee, which would require 3 months away from the ring. After a 3-month hiatus, Kobayashi returned to the ring for Seadlinnng on January 20, 2019, in a triple threat loss to Tsukushi.

She returned to Mexico one week later, again for CMLL, where she began a feud with La Amapola. After trading tag team wins and losses for almost 5 months, the two faced off in a 2/3 falls Luchas de Apuestas match at CMLL's Juicio Final pay-per-view on May 31, where Kobayashi was defeated and as a result had her head shaved bald and after which returned to Japan.

== Championships and accomplishments ==
- Consejo Mundial de Lucha Libre
  - CMLL-Reina International Junior Championship (1 time)
- JWP Joshi Puroresu
  - JWP Junior Championship (1 time)
  - Princess of Pro-Wrestling Championship (1 time)
- Oz Academy
  - Oz Academy Tag Team Championship (4 times) – with Akino (1), Kagetsu (2) and Kakeru Sekiguchi (1)
  - Best Wizard Award (2 times)
    - Best Bout Award (2017) with Kaho Kobayashi vs. Maya Yukihi and Mayumi Ozaki on October 29
    - MVP Award (2020)
- Pro Wrestling Wave
  - Wave Tag Team Championship (2 times) – with Hiroe Nagahama (1) and Zones (1)
  - Catch the Wave (2014 Young Block)
  - Catch the Wave Award (1 time)
    - Best Bout Award (2025) vs. Haruka Umesaki on July 5, shared with Mio Shirai vs. Risa Sera on May 14
- Pure-J
  - Daily Sports Women's Tag Team Championship (1 time) – with Hanako Nakamori
- Reina
  - Reina X World Tag Team Championship (1 time) – with Makoto
- World Woman Pro-Wrestling Diana
  - World Woman Pro-Wrestling Diana Tag Team Championship (1 time) – with Kaori Yoneyama

== Luchas de Apuestas record ==
Winner (wager)	Loser (wager)	Location	Event	Date	Notes
La Amapola (hair)	Kaho Kobayashi (hair)	Mexico City	Juicio Final	May 31, 2019	
