= Hikaru Shida =

Japanese professional wrestler and actress

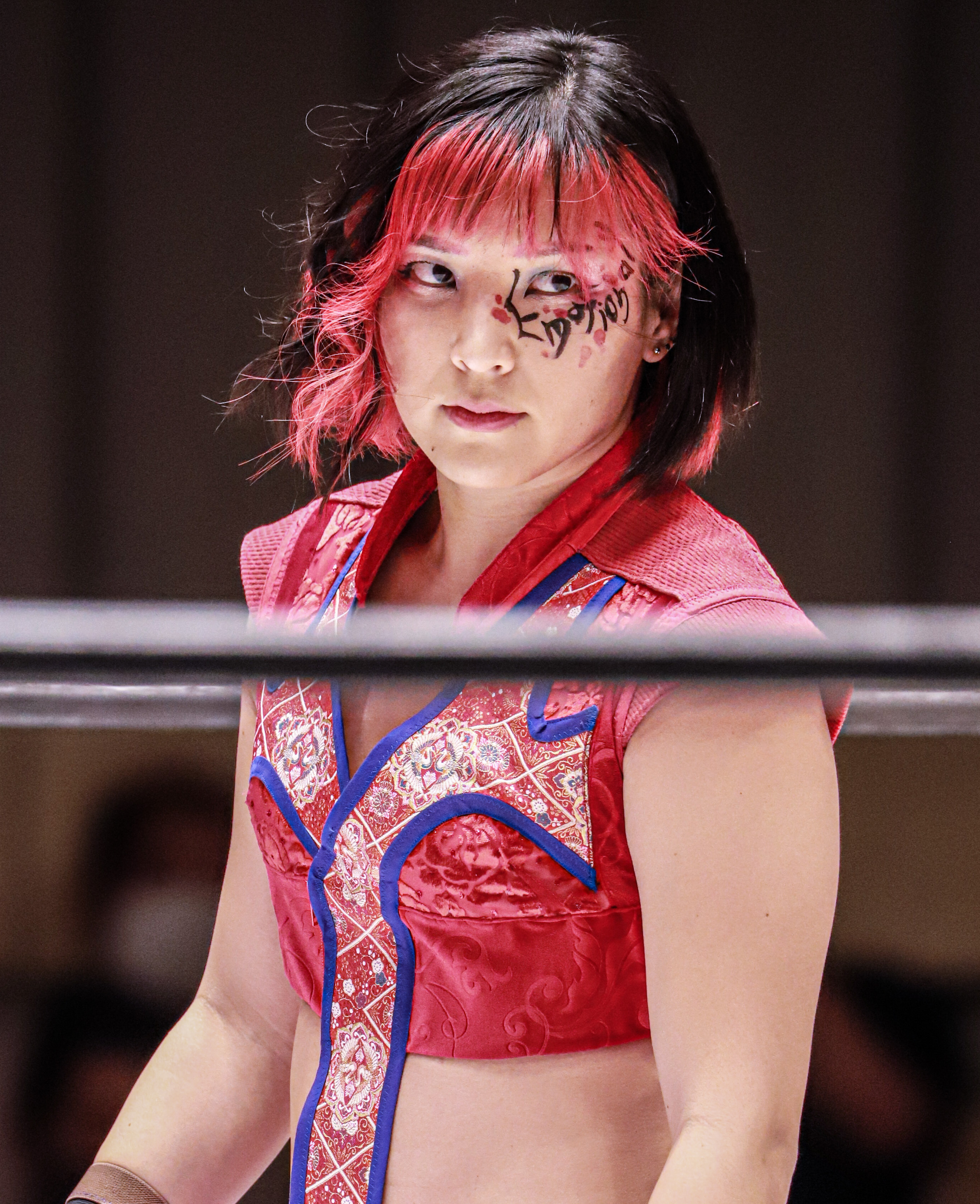
- Shida in 2022

Personal information
- Born: Hikaru Shida; June 11, 1988 (age 38) Samukawa, Kanagawa Prefecture, Japan

Professional wrestling career
- Ring name(s): Hika☆Rushi-da; Hikaru; Hikaru Shida; Kanjyuro Shida; Kaoru Hoshi; Miyako-fu Shida; Tsuruhime
- Billed height: 1.64 m (5 ft 4 1/2 in)
- Billed weight: 57 kg (126 lb)
- Billed from: Kanagawa, Japan
- Trained by: Emi Sakura; Yoshiko Tamura
- Debut: July 20, 2008

Hikaru Shida (志田 光, Shida Hikaru; born June 11, 1988) is a Japanese professional wrestler, martial artist, actress, and model. As a wrestler, she has been signed to All Elite Wrestling (AEW) since April 2019. She also wrestles for AEW's sister promotion Ring of Honor (ROH) and for the Japanese promotions Oz Academy and Pro Wrestling Wave.

Shida started her professional wrestling career in 2008, when she joined the Ice Ribbon promotion, after taking part in a film titled Three Count, set in the world of professional wrestling. She remained with the promotion until 2014, becoming a one-time ICE×60 Champion and five-time International Ribbon Tag Team Champion. Shida has also held the Wave Single Championship twice, the Oz Academy Tag Team Championship, and the Sendai Girls Tag Team Championship. She joined AEW as one of its original female wrestlers in April 2019 where she is a one-time AEW TBS Champion and a three-time AEW Women's World Champion and the second wrestler to win the TBS and World Titles; her first world championship reign is the longest in the championship’s history at 372 days, her second reign is also shortest in the championship’s history, at 25 days.

== Early life ==
In her childhood, Shida practiced both judo and kendo, reaching third-dan in the latter. She later embarked on a career as an actress, most notably working on the television series Muscle Venus, forming an idol group with fellow cast members Hina Kozuki, Ichiko Mayu, Miyako Matsumoto, Sachiko Koga, Tomoyo Morihisa, Tsukasa Fujimoto, Yuki Ueda and Yuri Natsume. In 2009, Shida was cast in the leading role in a film titled Three Count, set in the world of professional wrestling and also starring veteran professional wrestlers Emi Sakura, Kyoko Inoue and Yoshiko Tamura. For the role, Shida began training under Sakura at her Ice Ribbon dojo and after the conclusion of the taping, decided to find a new career in professional wrestling, joining Ice Ribbon with fellow cast members of both Muscle Venus and Three Count, Ichiko Mayu, Miyako Matsumoto, Sachiko Koga, Tomoyo Morihisa, Tsukasa Fujimoto and Yuki Ueda. only Shida, Matsumoto and Fujimoto lasted more than six months, making new careers out of professional wrestling.

== Professional wrestling career ==
=== Ice Ribbon (2008–2014) ===
Shida made her debut for Ice Ribbon on July 20, 2008, losing to Kazumi Shimouma. As is customary for a rookie in Japanese professional wrestling, Shida's first months in the business included mainly losses with only one singles victory, over Miyako Matsumoto on November 15. In March 2009, Shida finally started picking up victories more regularly, starting a partnership, and later a feud, with Makoto. On September 13, 2009, Shida ventured into the world of mixed martial arts, when she took part in a grappling match at the Jewels promotion's 5th Ring event. Shida lost the match, after submitting to Ayaka Hamasaki's armlock in 38 seconds.

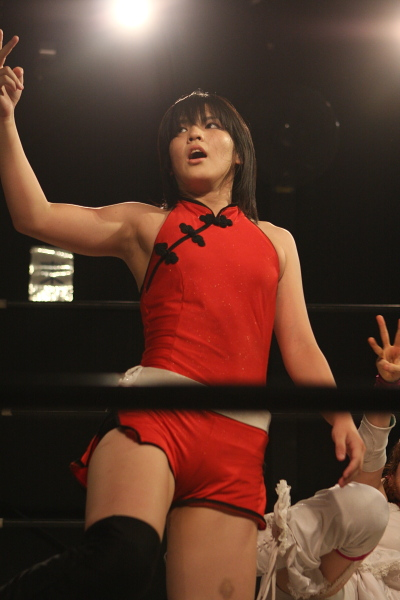
Shida in July 2010

During the summer of 2010, Shida made several appearances for the NEO Japan Ladies Pro-Wrestling promotion. Though pegged early on as the "Future Ace of Joshi Puroresu", Shida was the last of the Three Count threesome to reach a championship in Ice Ribbon. On October 20, 2010, Shida and Tsukasa Fujimoto received their first shot at the International Ribbon Tag Team Championship, but were defeated by Emi Sakura and Nanae Takahashi. In a rematch between the two teams on December 23, Shida and Fujimoto were victorious and became the new International Ribbon Tag Team Champions. The following day the team, known collectively as Muscle Venus, made their debut for the Smash promotion at Happening Eve, where they teamed with Sayaka Obihiro in a six-woman tag team match, where they were defeated by Cherry, Tomoka Nakagawa and Toshie Uematsu. Back in Ice Ribbon, Shida wrestled the biggest match of her career, up to that point, when she unsuccessfully challenged Yoshiko Tamura for the NWA Women's Pacific/NEO Single Championship on December 26 at Ribbon Mania 2010. Shida and Fujimoto then went on to successfully defend the International Tag Team Championship against Hikari Minami and Riho on January 4, 2011, and against the teams of Mochi Miyagi and Ryo Mizunami, and Makoto and Riho on February 6, winning the "Ike! Ike! Ima, Ike! Ribbon Tag Tournament" in the process. After defending the International Ribbon Tag Team Championship against Bambi and Makoto at a Kaientai Dojo event on March 20, Shida and Fujimoto lost the title to Emi Sakura and Ray six days later.

On March 21, Shida was voted by Ice Ribbon fans as the opponent for visiting Smash wrestler Syuri. Shida would win the match with the Falcon arrow. The match eventually led to a partnership between the two Kanagawa wrestlers, and, after defeating Chii Tomiya and Makoto on April 16, Shida and Syuri went on to unsuccessfully challenge Emi Sakura and Ray for the International Ribbon Tag Team Championship on May 5. The partnership also carried over to Smash, where Shida and Syuri defeated Io and Mio Shirai in a tag team match on May 3 at Smash.17. On June 9 at Smash.18, Shida was defeated by Syuri in a first round match of a tournament to determine the inaugural Smash Diva Champion. On September 24, Shida and Fujimoto attempted to regain the International Ribbon Tag Team Championship, but were defeated in the semifinals of a tournament for the vacant title by Manami Toyota and Tsukushi. The following month, Shida and Fujimoto, along with Emi Sakura and Hikari Minami, traveled to Nottingham, England to take part in events promoted by Pro Wrestling EVE and Southside Wrestling Entertainment (SWE). During 2011, Shida also took part in Ice Ribbon's interpromotional rivalry with the Sendai Girls' Pro Wrestling promotion. On October 27, Shida, Emi Sakura, Hikari Minami, Tsukasa Fujimoto and Tsukushi represented Ice Ribbon in Sendai's Joshi Puroresu Dantai Taikou Flash tournament, a single-elimination tournament, where different joshi promotions battled each other. The team was eliminated from the tournament in the first round by Team Sendai (Meiko Satomura, Dash Chisako, Kagetsu, Miyako Morino and Sendai Sachiko).

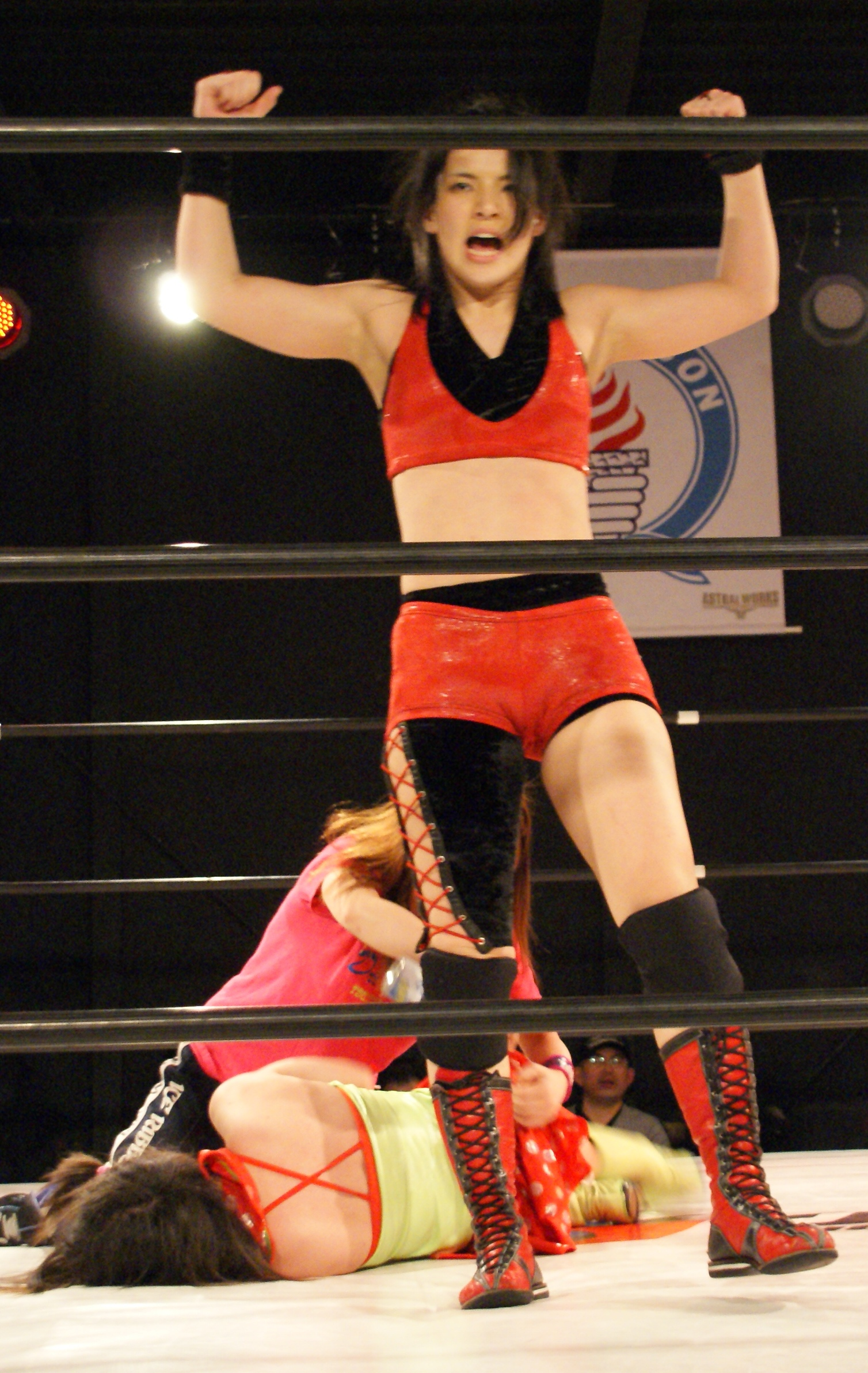
Shida posing after defeating Tsukushi in January 2012

When Tsukasa Fujimoto regained the ICE×60 Championship on November 19, it was announced that Shida would be her first challenger on December 25 at RibbonMania 2011. On December 7, Shida pinned Fujimoto in a tag team match, where she teamed with Maki Narumiya and Fujimoto with Mochi Miyagi. At RibbonMania 2011, Shida defeated Fujimoto to win the ICE×60 Championship for the first time. Three days later, Shida and Maki Narumiya defeated Emi Sakura and Tsukushi to win the International Ribbon Tag Team Championship, making Shida a double champion. On January 8, 2012, Shida main evented Bull Nakano's retirement show, losing to World Wonder Ring Stardom wrestler and Wonder of Stardom Champion Yuzuki Aikawa. After successful defenses against the Lovely Butchers (Hamuko Hoshi and Mochi Miyagi) and Dorami Nagano and Hailey Hatred, Shida and Narumiya lost the International Ribbon Tag Team Championship to Tsukasa Fujimoto and Tsukushi on February 5. On March 4, Shida made her debut for the Universal Woman's Pro Wrestling Reina promotion, defeating fellow Ice Ribbon worker Neko Nitta in the opening match of Reina.28.

on April 21, when she defeated IW19 Champion Kurumi. After defeating Otera Pro representative Aki Shizuku in a non-title match, Shida sent out a challenge to her friend, Wrestling New Classic's Kana. The first confrontation between Shida and Kana took place on April 25, when Kana and Shizuku defeated Shida and April Davids in a tag team match. On May 5 at Golden Ribbon 2012, Shida was defeated by Kana in a non-title singles match. Afterwards, Shida began feuding with former tag team partner Maki Narumiya. After a non-title match between the two on May 26 ended in a ten-minute time limit draw, Narumiya was named the number one contender to the ICE×60 Championship, provided she could make the 60 kg (130 lb) weight limit. On June 9, Shida took part in the first event of Reina X World, the follow-up promotion to Universal Woman's Pro Wrestling Reina, during which she and Tsukasa Fujimoto defeated Aki Kanbayashi and Mia Yim in the finals of a four-team tournament to win the vacant Reina World Tag Team Championship. On June 17, Shida defeated Maki Narumiya in the main event of Ice Ribbon's sixth anniversary event to make her third successful defense of the ICE×60 Championship. In July, as the reigning Reina World Tag Team Champions, Shida and Fujimoto traveled to Mexico to work for Consejo Mundial de Lucha Libre (CMLL). Working just under their given names, Hikaru and Tsukasa made their CMLL debuts on July 3 in Guadalajara, teaming with La Comandante in a six-woman tag team match, where they were defeated by Goya Kong, Luna Mágica and Silueta. Three days later, Hikaru and Tsukasa teamed with Lady Apache in Mexico City in another six-woman tag team match, where they were defeated by Dark Angel, Estrellita and Marcela. Hikaru's and Tsukasa's tour of CMLL concluded on June 8 in Mexico City, when they teamed with Princesa Sujei to defeat Dalys la Caribeña, Lluvia and Luna Mágica in a six-woman tag team match. Upon her return to Japan, Shida made her fourth successful defense of the ICE×60 Championship by defeating Hamuko Hoshi on July 15 at Sapporo Ribbon 2012. On August 5, Shida made her debut for Oz Academy, losing to Aja Kong. On August 19, Ice Ribbon held a special event to celebrate Muscle Venus' fourth anniversary in professional wrestling, which saw Shida and Fujimoto defeat Maki Narumiya and Meari Naito in the main event for their first successful defense of the Reina World Tag Team Championship. The following day, Shida became the longest reigning ICE×60 Champion in history by surpassing Fujimoto's previous record of 238 days. Shida's and Fujimoto's second successful defense of the Reina World Tag Team Championship took place back in Reina X World on August 26, when they defeated Crazy Star and Silueta. Three days later, Shida made her fifth successful defense of the ICE×60 Championship against Neko Nitta. On September 23 at Ribbon no Kishitachi 2012, Shida lost the ICE×60 Championship to freelancer Mio Shirai in her sixth defense, ending her record-setting reign at 273 days. Ribbon no Kishitachi 2012 also saw the debut of the first wrestler trained by Shida, Oshima Kujira.

On September 25, Shida entered Pro Wrestling Wave's 2012 Dual Shock Wave tournament as Yumi Ohka's partner. Ohka had chosen Shida as her partner, after her rival Misaki Ohata had chosen to team with Tsukasa Fujimoto. In their opening round-robin match of the tournament, Shida and Ohka were defeated by Shuu Shibutani and Syuri. They, however, bounced back, defeating Kurigohan (Ayumi Kurihara and Mika Iida) on September 30 and first Impact (Makoto and Moeka Haruhi) on October 23 to finish their round-robin tournament at four points, tied at the top with Shuu Shibutani and Syuri, forcing a decision match between the two teams. Shida and Ohka ended up losing the decision match and were, as a result, eliminated from the tournament. On October 27, Shida made her debut for World Wonder Ring Stardom, teaming with Act Yasukawa and Cherry in a six-woman tag team match, where they were defeated by the Kimura Monster-gun (Alpha Female, Hailey Hatred and Kyoko Kimura). The following day at an Ice Ribbon event, Shida challenged Hatred for the Triangle Ribbon Championship in a three-way match, which also included Aki Shizuku, but was disqualified after using a shinai on the champion. Earlier in the event, Aja Kong made a rare Ice Ribbon appearance, inviting Shida back to Oz Academy. Shida continued using the shinai in her matches for the next month. On November 25 at Nagoya Ribbon II – 2012, Shida and Tsukasa Fujimoto entered a one-day tag team tournament, where they were forced to put the Reina World Tag Team Championship on the line in all of their matches. They were, however, given a bye directly to the semifinals of the tournament. After defeating Neko Nitta and Shuu Shibutani in their semifinal match, Shida and Fujimoto defeated Kurumi and Tsukushi to not only win the tournament and retain the Reina World Tag Team Championship, but to also win the International Ribbon Tag Team Championship. However, just three days later, Shida and Fujimoto lost both titles to Hailey Hatred and Hamuko Hoshi. On December 9, Shida returned to Oz Academy, losing to Aja Kong in the second match between the two. At Ice Ribbon's year-end RibbonMania 2012 event on December 31, Shida and Tsukasa Fujimoto were defeated in a tag team match by World Wonder Ring Stardom representatives Nanae Takahashi and Natsuki☆Taiyo. Back in Pro Wrestling Wave on January 4, 2013, Shida and Yumi Ohka failed to capture the Wave Tag Team Championship from Misaki Ohata and Tsukasa Fujimoto in a title match, which ended in a thirty-minute time limit draw. The following day, Aja Kong made her Ice Ribbon in-ring debut to team with Shida in a tag team main event, where they were defeated by Hamuko Hoshi and Maki Narumiya. On January 13, Shida made another appearance for Oz Academy, teaming with Kong in a tag team match, where they were defeated by Hiroyo Matsumoto and Tomoka Nakagawa. After the ICE×60 Championship was vacated, following Maki Narumiya being sidelined with an injury, Shida entered a round-robin tournament to determine the new champion, defeating her trainee Risa Sera in her opening match on January 16. After a draw with Tsukushi on January 26, and a win over Neko Nitta on February 2, Shida finished at the top of her round-robin block, ensuring a spot in the semifinals of the tournament. On February 8, Shida took part in Syuri's first self-produced event, Stimulus, which saw the two lose to Meiko Satomura and Tomoka Nakagawa in a main event tag team match. On February 23, Shida was eliminated from the ICE×60 Championship tournament in the semifinals by Miyako Matsumoto.

Meanwhile, Shida also continued teaming with Aja Kong in Oz Academy and, after two more losses, picked up her first win in the promotion on March 17, when she pinned Sonoko Kato in a tag team match, where she and Kong faced Kato and Dynamite Kansai. Following the win, Shida and Kong were named number one contenders to the Oz Academy Tag Team Championship, however, prior to the title match, the two faced off in another singles match on April 14, where Kong was again victorious in an attempt to toughen Shida up for the title challenge. On April 24, Shida and Kong defeated Hiroyo Matsumoto and Tomoka Nakagawa to become the new Oz Academy Tag Team Champions. On May 25, Shida also became a tag team champion in her home promotion, when she and Tsukasa Fujimoto defeated Aoi Kizuki and Tsukushi for the International Ribbon Tag Team and Reina World Tag Team Championships. Two days later, Shida and Fujimoto relinquished the Reina World Tag Team Championship and returned the title to the Reina Joshi Puroresu promotion, which had recently undergone a change in management. Shida and Fujimoto made their first successful defense of the International Ribbon Tag Team Championship on June 22 against BBA38 (Cherry and Meari Naito). From May 15 to June 28, Shida took part in Pro Wrestling Wave's 2013 Catch the Wave tournament, finishing with a record of two wins, two draws and two losses and failing to advance from her round-robin block. Back in Ice Ribbon, Shida earned a big win on July 14 by defeating Syuri, who was making her first appearance for the promotion in over two years and with whom she had wrestled to a time limit draw during the 2013 Catch the Wave. The following day, Shida and Yumi Ohka defeated Triple Tails.S (Kana and Mio Shirai) to win the Wave Tag Team Championship, meaning that Shida now held three tag team championships simultaneously in three different promotions. On July 26, Shida made her debut for Pro Wrestling Zero1, teaming with Aja Kong in a tag team match, where they defeated Dynamite Kansai and Yuhi. On August 11, Shida and Kong lost the Oz Academy Tag Team Championship back to Matsumoto and Nakagawa in their first defense. Four days later, Shida also lost the Wave Tag Team Championship, when she and Ohka were defeated by Nakagawa and Gami. On August 18, Shida made an appearance for DDT Pro-Wrestling at the promotion's annual event in Ryōgoku Kokugikan, taking part in the debut match of Saki Akai, alongside whom she had acted in the Muscle Girl! television drama. Shida teamed with Hiroshi Fukuda and Yoshiko in a six-person tag team match, where they were defeated by Akai, Cherry and Masa Takanashi. On September 22, Shida and Fujimoto made their second successful defense of the International Ribbon Tag Team Championship against Mio Shirai and Rutsuko Yamaguchi. From September 1 to October 6, Shida and Fujimoto took part in Pro Wrestling Wave's 2013 Dual Shock Wave tournament, where they made it all the way to the finals, before losing to Ayako Hamada and Yuu Yamagata in a three-way match, which also included Kana and Yumi Ohka. On October 17, Shida took part in a big generational eight-on-eight elimination match promoted by Sendai Girls' Pro Wrestling, where she, Kagetsu, Manami Katsu, Sareee, Syuri, Takumi Iroha, Yoshiko and Yuhi defeated Aja Kong, Command Bolshoi, Dump Matsumoto, Dynamite Kansai, Kyoko Inoue, Manami Toyota, Meiko Satomura and Takako Inoue. Shida eliminated Bolshoi from the match, before being eliminated herself by Toyota. On October 19, Shida made her American debut for Shimmer Women Athletes in Berwyn, Illinois, defeating Mia Yim as part of Volume 58. Later that same day on Volume 59, Shida was defeated by Nicole Matthews, after being hit with her own shinai. This led to a rematch on the following day's Volume 60, where Shida defeated Matthews in a match, where usage of the shinai was legal. Shida finished her weekend and first American visit, losing to Madison Eagles on Volume 61 in a three-way match, which also included Kana. On December 7, Shida and Fujimoto made their third successful defense of the International Ribbon Tag Team Championship against the team of Hamuko Hoshi and Kurumi.

Muscle Venus' fourth successful defense took place on January 4, 2014, when they defeated Kurumi and Kyoko Inoue. Following the match, Shida announced her resignation from Ice Ribbon, effective March 30. Despite the announcement, Shida and Fujimoto continued their reign as the International Ribbon Tag Team Champions, defeating .STAP (Maki Narumiya and Risa Sera) on February 15, Mio Shirai and Miyako Matsumoto on March 9, Hamuko Hoshi and Miyako Matsumoto on March 12, Kurumi and Tsukushi on March 15, and N^{3} (Maki Narumiya and Meari Naito) on March 22 in what was billed as Muscle Venus' final match together. From February 21 to 25, Shida worked a four event tour with Wrestle-1, wrestling Shuu Shibutani in singles matches. The series ended 2–2 with Shida winning the second and fourth matches. Shida wrestled her final Ice Ribbon match on March 30 at Korakuen Hall, when she was defeated by longtime tag team partner Tsukasa Fujimoto in a singles match. Post-match, the two relinquished the International Ribbon Tag Team Championship, ending their reign during which they set new records for both the longest reign, at 309 days, and most successful title defenses, with nine.

=== Freelancing and Makai (2014–2019) ===
Shida worked her first event as a freelancer on April 1, 2014, for Miyako Matsumoto's Gake no Fuchi Puroresu. As part of the event, Shida wrestled twice; first losing to Red Arremer and then defeating Matsumoto in a Last Woman Standing match. On April 5, Shida returned to the United States to work for Shimmer at their Volume 62 internet pay-per-view (iPPV) in New Orleans, Louisiana, where she defeated Evie. On April 12, Shida took part in Shimmer's DVD tapings back in Berwyn, losing to Mia Yim as part of Volume 63 and defeating Kimber Lee as part of Volume 64. The following day, Shida lost to Mercedes Martinez on Volume 65, before ending her American tour with a win over Athena on Volume 66. Upon her return to Japan, Shida was granted a shot at Pro Wrestling Wave Single Championship on April 20, but was defeated by the defending champion, Yumi Ohka. On May 9, Shida announced she would start producing her own independent events under the banner of "Oshiri Ressha de Go!" (Japanese for "Go by Buttock Train!"), starting with August 28 in Tokyo's Shinjuku Face. From May 5 to June 22, Shida took part in the round-robin portion of the 2014 Catch the Wave tournament, finishing with a record of four wins and two draws and winning her block. On July 27, Shida first defeated Tomoka Nakagawa in the semifinals and then Misaki Ohata in the finals to win the 2014 Catch the Wave.

On August 24, Shida defeated Yumi Ohka to become the new Wave Single Champion. On August 28, in the main event of the first Oshiri Ressha de Go! event, Shida teamed with Masato Tanaka in an intergender tag team match, where they were defeated by Kana and Kenny Omega. Three days later, Shida made her first successful defense of the Wave Single Championship against Mika Iida. On October 4, Shida made her debut for Revolution Championship Wrestling (RCW) in Barcelona, Spain, defeating Leah Owens and Audrey Bride in a three-way match to win the RCW Women's Championship. On October 29, Shida successfully defended both the Wave Single Championship and the RCW Women's Championship against Mari Apache. She made another successful defense of both titles on December 21, when her match with Mio Shirai ended in a thirty-minute time limit draw. On December 26, Shida returned to Reina Joshi Puroresu, coming to Syuri's aid and attacking Kana after she had defeated her to become the new Reina World Women's Champion. On January 25, Shida made her fourth successful defense of the Wave Single Championship against Kyusei Sakura Hirota. On February 7, Shida returned to RCW, losing the promotion's Women's Championship back to Leah Owens in a street fight. Four days later, Shida also lost the Wave Single Championship to Ayako Hamada.

On February 25, Shida and Syuri defeated Arisa Nakajima and Kana to win the Reina World Tag Team Championship. On March 25, Shida became Reina's new "general producer" (GP), an on-screen authority figure, after she, Shiro Koshinaka and Zeus defeated Cat Power, Yuko Miyamoto and the previous GP, Kana, in a six-person tag team match. On June 13, Shida and Syuri lost the Reina World Tag Team Championship to Makoto and Rina Yamashita. In July, Shida took part in a WWE tryout held by William Regal, during the promotion's visit to Japan. Also in July, Shida made it to the semifinals of the 2015 Catch the Wave tournament, but was defeated there by Mika Iida. In Reina, Shida became the leader of the Shiri Gamikyō stable, which feuded with Syuri's Narcissist-gun until December 26, when Shida led her stablemates Jun Kasai and Toru Owashi to a win over Syuri, Buffalo and Mineo Fujita in a feud ending six-person tag team match. On September 11, 2016, Shida and Syuri defeated Kaori Yoneyama and Tsubasa Kuragaki to win the Oz Academy Tag Team Championship. Shida and Syuri won another title on November 23, when they defeated Dash Chisako and Kaoru for the Sendai Girls Tag Team Championship.

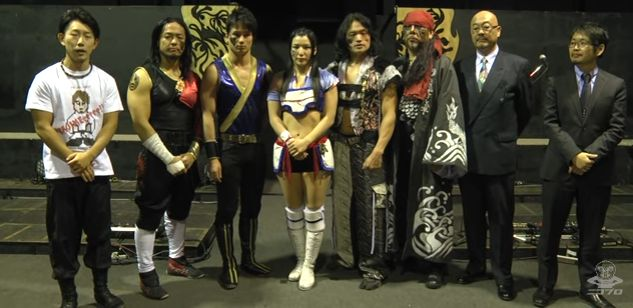
Shida with the Makai troupe in February 2017

In February 2017, Shida ended her freelancing days by signing with the Makai company, which presents shows combining music, theater and wrestling. She had worked for the company since October 2014, performing under the name Tsuruhime. Shida and Syuri lost the Oz Academy Tag Team Championship to Akino and Kaho Kobayashi in their fourth defense on June 25, 2017. On July 15, Shida and Syuri lost the Sendai Girls Tag Team Championship to Cassandra Miyagi and Dash Chisako also in their fourth defense. In November, Shida returned to Shimmer Women Athletes, unsuccessfully challenging Mercedes Martinez for the Shimmer Championship on Volume 97.

=== All Elite Wrestling / Ring of Honor (2019–present) ===
==== World championship reigns (2019–2024) ====
On April 9, 2019, it was announced that Shida signed a contract with All Elite Wrestling (AEW). On May 25, Shida made her AEW debut at Double or Nothing, competing in a six-woman tag-team match. On August 31 at All Out, Riho defeated Shida where the winner competed for the inaugural AEW Women's World Championship on October 2, the debut episode of Dynamite.

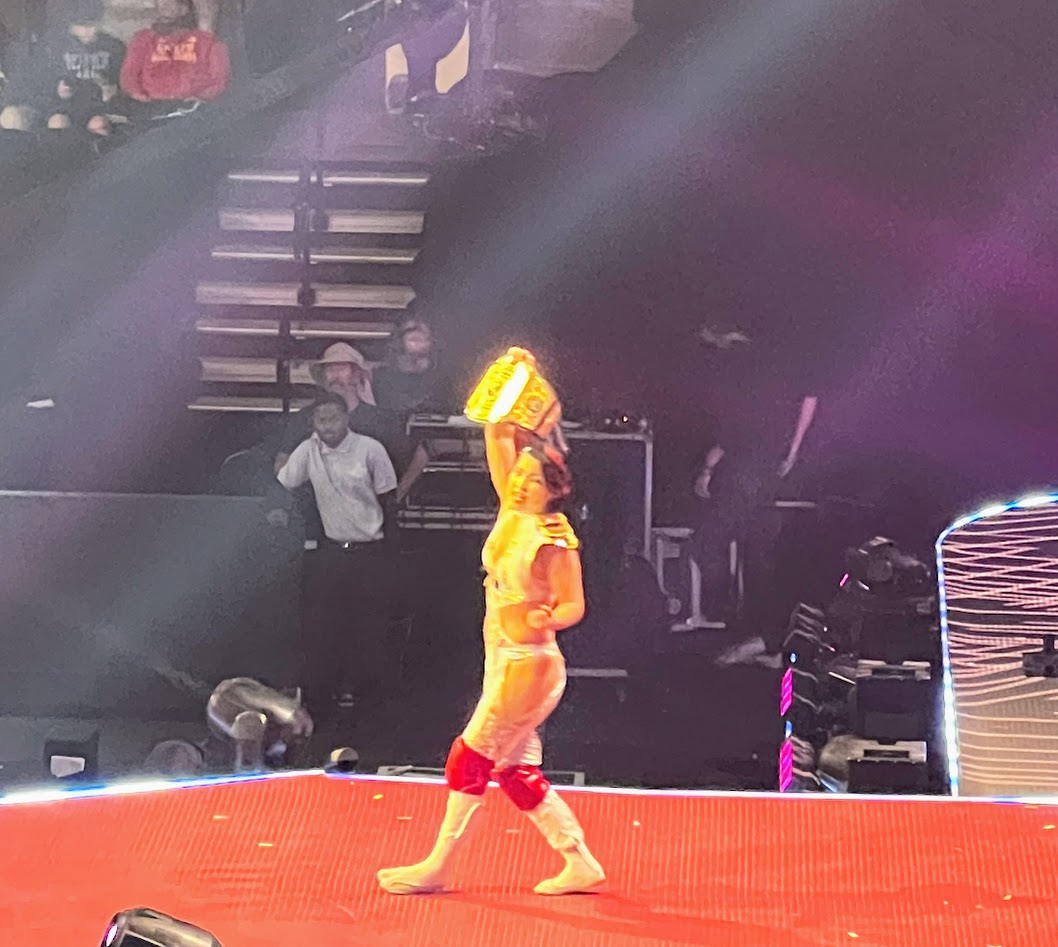
Shida after winning the AEW Women's World Championship in October 2023

On the January 1, 2020, episode of Dynamite, Shida lost in an AEW Women's World Championship match involving the champion Riho, Britt Baker, and Nyla Rose, with Riho retaining. At Bash at the Beach, Shida teamed with Kris Statlander, defeating Brandi Rhodes and Melanie Cruise. On May 23 at Double or Nothing, Shida defeated Nyla Rose in a no disqualification and no countout match to win her first AEW Women's World Championship. Shida had her first title defense at Fyter Fest against Penelope Ford. Before the match started Kip Sabian was being physically aggressive to Shida so as a result he was banned from ringside leaving Ford's corner empty, and Shida retained. On the August 22 episode of Dynamite, Shida was challenged for her title by the NWA World Women's Champion Thunder Rosa. Their match was scheduled on All Out on September 5 where Shida successfully defended her title against Rosa. At the end of January 2021, Shida returned to Japan to help produce the Japanese bracket in the Women's World Championship Eliminator Tournament, where the winner will face Shida for her title at Revolution. During her stay in Japan, Shida had her first match over a month, where she alongside Mei Suruga and Rin Kadokura defeated Maki Itoh, Veny and Shida's trainer Emi Sakura. Ryo Mizunami ended up being the tournament winner, and the two had a match for the title at Revolution, which Shida won. On May 30 at Double or Nothing, Britt Baker defeated Shida for the AEW Women's World Championship, ending Shida's reign at 372 days, the longest reign in the title's history.

On October 27 episode of Dynamite, Shida faced Serena Deeb in the first round of TBS Championship Tournament which Shida won and this also concluded her 50th AEW win. Shida was eliminated by Nyla Rose in the quarterfinals. On April 6, 2022, episode of Dynamite, Shida participated in the Women's Owen Hart Foundation Tournament and defeated Julia Hart in the qualifier match. On May 13 episode of Rampage, Tony Schiavone announced that Shida was out of the tournament due to injury and was replaced by Kris Statlander. It was revealed that Shida was working in Japan during the tournament and she could not re-enter the country in time. On September 4 at All Out, Shida faced Baker, Jamie Hayter and Toni Storm for the interim AEW Women's World Championship which Shida lost. At Dynamite: Holiday Bash, Shida faced Hayter for the championship in a losing effort. The match received positive reception from AEW backstage.

On the July 29, 2023, episode of Rampage, Shida defeated Nyla Rose for an AEW Women's World Championship title match at the August 2 episode of Dynamite, where she defeated Toni Storm to become a two-time champion. She lost the title to Saraya at All In in a four-way match also involving Storm and Baker, in which Saraya pinned Storm to end Shida's second reign at 25 days as the shortest reign in the title's history. Shida regained the title from Saraya on October 10 at Dynamite: Title Tuesday to become the first record-setting three-time champion. On the October 25 episode of Dynamite, it was announced that Shida will defend her title at Full Gear against Storm, who had dubbed herself as "Timeless" Toni Storm. At Full Gear, Storm defeated Shida for her record-tying third title win, ending Shida's third reign at 39 days.

==== Championship pursuits (2024–present) ====
Shida made her Ring of Honor (ROH) debut on the March 14, 2024, episode of Ring of Honor Wrestling, where she answered ROH Women's World Champion Athena's open challenge for her title at Supercard of Honor. On the following episode of Ring of Honor Wrestling, Shida won her ROH debut match against Rachael Ellering. At Supercard of Honor on April 5, Shida failed to defeat Athena for the title. Two months later, Shida participated in the Women's Owen Hart Foundation Tournament, defeating Deonna Purrazzo in the first round on the June 29 episode of Collision but lost to Mariah May in the semifinal on the July 5 episode of Rampage: Beach Break. On the August 31 episode of Collision, Shida defeated Queen Aminata, Thunder Rosa and Serena Deeb in a four-way match to earn an AEW TBS Championship match against Mercedes Moné at All Out on September 7 but failed to win the title. Shida would remain off television for the remainder of 2024 and the whole of 2025. In June 2025, Shida revealed her absence from AEW since November 2024 was due to visa issues. She later confirmed the renewal of her contract and return to the USA.

On the April 2, 2026 episode of Collision, Shida returned after over a year off AEW television, unsuccessfully challenging Willow Nightingale for the AEW TBS Championship. In the following weeks, Shida would attempt to form a tag team with fellow AEW original Kris Statlander and began teasing a heel turn, where she would insult other wrestlers in Japanese without them knowing. On the April 29 episode of Dynamite, Shida and Statlander failed to defeat Divine Dominion (Lena Kross and Megan Bayne) for the AEW Women's World Tag Team Championship. At Double or Nothing on May 24, Shida failed to win the AEW Women's World Championship in a four-way match also involving Statlander, whom Shida turned against and cemented her heel turn. Three days later on Collision, Shida lost against Statlander in a Lights Out Philly Street Fight.

After Willow Nightingale relinquished the TBS Championship due to injury, Shida qualified for AEW's first-ever Survival of the Fittest match to determine the next champion. On the July 1 episode of Dynamite, Shida last eliminated Statlander by referee stoppage in the Survival of the Fittest match to win the vacant title. On the July 11 episode of Collision, Shida had her first successful title defense against Harley Cameron. On July 26 at Redemption, Shida lost her title to Maya World, ending her reign at 25 days.

=== Return to Japan (2022–present) ===
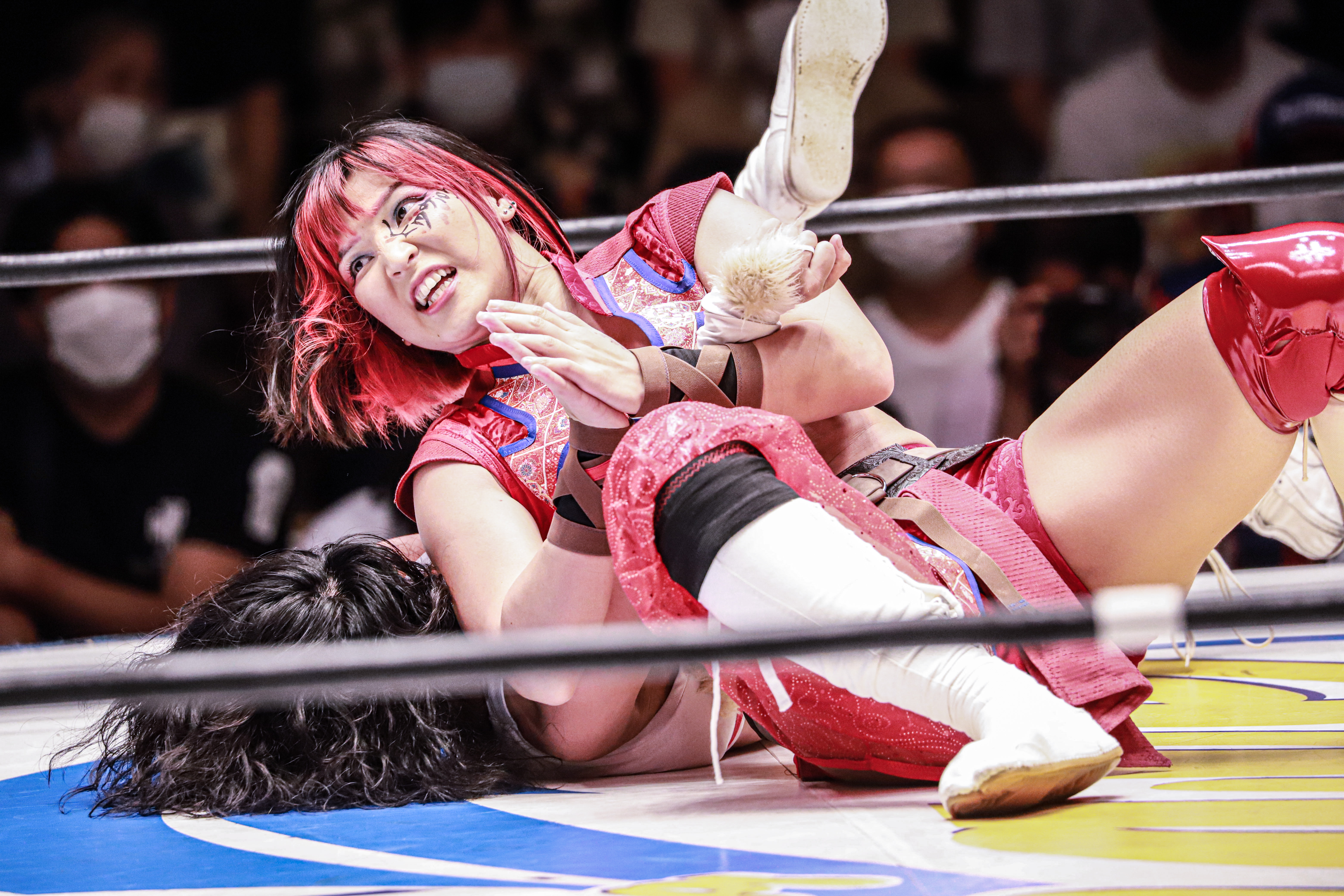
Shida applying a submission hold during a match in July 2022

On February 11, 2022, Tokyo Joshi Pro-Wrestling (TJPW) announced that Shida would debut on TJPW on March 19 at Grand Princess '22, marking Shida's first in-ring appearance in Japan in two and a half years. At the event, Shida defeated Hikari Noa. On August 14, at Pro Wrestling WAVE's 14th anniversary show, Shida defeated Suzu Suzuki to win the Wave Single Championship for the second time in her career. On September 24, Shida alongside Ibuki Hoshi defeated the team of Hamuko Hoshi and Makoto to win the International Ribbon Tag Team Championship, which individually, marks the fifth reign of Shida with the title. With the Wave Singles Championship, Shida made several successful title defenses in AEW, such against The Bunny and Emi Sakura. On March 19, 2023, Shida and Hoshi lost their International Ribbon Tag Team Championship back to Hoshi and Makoto, ending their reign at 176 days.

== Other media ==
Hikaru Shida

YouTube information
- Channel: HIKARU SHIDA @SHIDAtube
- Years active: 2020–present
- Genres: Gaming; Let's Play; Video game livestreaming
- Subscribers: 53 thousand
- Views: 2.7 million
- Last updated: April 3, 2026

In 2008, the cast of Muscle Venus recorded a song titled Itsuka Kitto (いつかきっと; "Someday"), which was released as a single on November 5, 2008, and later used as the theme song for the Three Count film. Shida, along with Miyako Matsumoto and Tsukasa Fujimoto, was featured in Japanese pop group angela's 2012 music video for their song "The Lights of Heroes". From June 20 to 22, 2014, Shida was a part of stage acting group Mizuiro Kakumei, working three performances in Tokyo. On August 29, 2014, Shida released her first gravure DVD, titled Nure Shiri (濡尻; "Wet Butt"). Her second DVD, titled Shiri Kamisama no Iutōri! (尻神様の言う通り！), was released on October 30, 2015.

Shida made her video game debut as a playable character in AEW Fight Forever.

=== Filmography ===
- 2008: Nekonade (ネコナデ)
- 2009: Three Count (スリーカウント, Surī Kaunto)
- 2009: Robo Geisha (ロボゲイシャ)
- 2009: Heisei Tonpachi Yarō: Otoko wa Tsurada Yo (平成トンパチ野郎～男はツラだよ～)
- 2010: Mutant Girls Squad (戦闘少女 血の鉄仮面伝説, Sentō Shōjo Chi no Tetsu Kamen Densetsu)
- 2011: Crazy-Ism (クレイジズム, Kureijizumu)
- 2014: Taiyo Kara Plancha (太陽からプランチャ, Taiyo Kara Purancha)

=== Television ===
- 2008–2009: Muscle Venus (マッスルビーナス, Massuru Bīnasu)
- 2009: Wrestle Arena (レッスルアリーナ, Ressuru Arīna)
- 2009: Gogo Tama (ごごたま)
- 2009: S-Arena
- 2010: Maru Summers (マルさま～ず, Maru Samaazu)
- 2011: Muscle Girl! (マッスルガール!, Massuru Gāru!)
- 2011: Tensai TV-kun (天才てれびくん, Tensai Terebikun)
- 2012: Time Scoop Hunter (タイムスクープハンター, Taimu Sukūpu Hantā)

== Personal life ==
Shida is an avid cosplayer and she incorporates aspects of her cosplay attire into her wrestling gear.

== Championships and accomplishments ==
- All Elite Wrestling
  - AEW Women's World Championship (3 times)
  - AEW TBS Championship (1 time)
  - AEW Award (1 time)
    - Breakout Star – Female (2021)
- Ice Ribbon
  - ICE×60 Championship (1 time)
  - International Ribbon Tag Team Championship (5 times) – with Tsukasa Fujimoto (3), Maki Narumiya (1), and Ibuki Hoshi (1)
  - Double Crown Tag Championship Tournament (2012) – with Tsukasa Fujimoto
  - Gyakkyou Nine! (2011)
  - Ike! Ike! Ima, Ike! Ribbon Tag Tournament (2011) – with Tsukasa Fujimoto
- Oz Academy
  - Oz Academy Openweight Championship (1 time)
  - Oz Academy Tag Team Championship (2 times) – with Aja Kong (1) and Syuri (1)
  - Best Wizard Award (3 time)
    - Best Bout Award (2015) with Arisa Nakajima and Hiroyo Matsumoto vs. Akino, Sonoko Kato and Tsubasa Kuragaki on August 23
    - Best Bout Award (2018) vs. Aja Kong on September 17
    - MVP Award (2018)
- Pro Wrestling Illustrated
  - Ranked No. 6 of the top 100 female wrestlers in the PWI Women's 100 in 2020
- Pro Wrestling Wave
  - Wave Single Championship (2 times)
  - Wave Tag Team Championship (1 time) – with Yumi Ohka
  - Catch the Wave (2014)
  - Zan1 (2015)
  - Catch the Wave Award (2 times)
    - Best Bout Award (2018) vs. Misaki Ohata on March 23
    - Special Award (2019)
- Reina X World / Reina Joshi Puroresu
  - Reina World Tag Team Championship (3 times) – with Tsukasa Fujimoto (2), and Syuri (1)
  - Reina World Tag Team Championship 1Day Tournament (2012) – with Tsukasa Fujimoto
- Revolution Championship Wrestling
  - RCW Women's Championship (1 time)
- Sendai Girls' Pro Wrestling
  - Sendai Girls Tag Team Championship (1 time) – with Syuri
