= Aki Shizuku =

Japanese professional wrestler

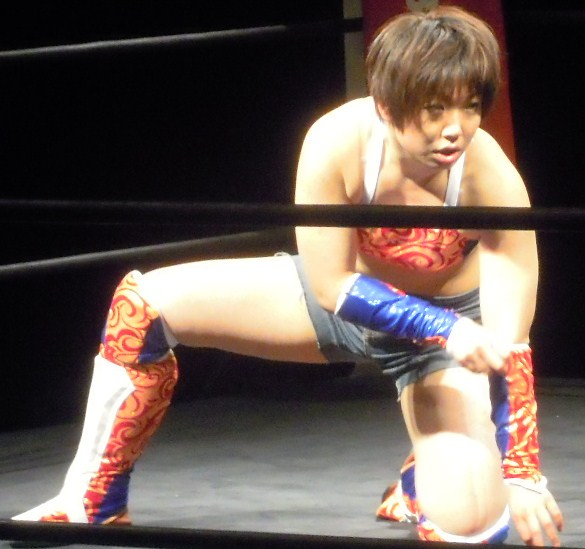
- Shizuku in April 2012

Personal information
- Born: 31 October 1986 (age 40) Kawasaki, Japan
- Education: Sophia Junior College; Keio University

Professional wrestling career
- Ring name: Chiaki Machida Yuki Shizuku Babaa Aki Shizuku
- Billed height: 170 cm (5 ft 7 in)
- Billed weight: 67 kg (148 lb)
- Trained by: Yuki Ishikawa
- Debut: 2007

Aki Shizuku (雫 有希, Shizuku Aki) is a Japanese professional wrestler and former amateur wrestler signed to Pro-Wrestling Evolution (EVO). She is best known for her tenures with various promotions from the Japanese independent scene such as JWP Joshi Puroresu (JWP), Professional Wrestling Just Tap Out (JTO) and Ice Ribbon.

== Early life ==
Shizuku attended the Sakae Higashi High School where she started practicing amateur wrestling and placed third in the 72 kg class at the All Japan Student Championships in her sophomore year. She has also attended the Sophia Junior College. Shizuku attended the Keio University where she majored in letters. During her university years, she won second place in the 67 kg class amateur wrestling tournament, shortly before making her debut in professional wrestling.

In addition to professional wrestling, Shizuku is a certified hypnotherapist accredited by the American Board of Hypnotherapy (ABH) and by the National Guild of Hypnotists (NGH), a certified professional counselor recognized by the National Federation of Psychological Professionals and a Jodo Buddhist priest.

== Professional wrestling career ==
=== Japanese independent circuit (2007–present) ===
Shizuku made her professional wrestling debut under the ring name "Chiaki Machida" at Ito Dojo ~ Heart ~ Chapter 5, a freelance event promoted on October 13, 2007, where she defeated Midori in singles competition. In the first several years of her career, Shizuku competed in various promotions from the Japanese independent scene such as JWP Joshi Puroresu, Ice Ribbon, Marvelous That's Women Pro Wrestling and Reina Joshi Puroresu both as a regular or as a freelancer.

Shizuku competed in the Ganbare☆Martial Arts Open Tournament on May 1, 2014, where she defeated Hagane Goriki in the first rounds then fell short to Tatsuhito Takaiwa in the semifinals. At K-DOJO 16th Anniversary Club-K Super Evolution 16, an event promoted by Kaientai Dojo on April 22, 2018, she teamed up with Makoto and Bambi to unsuccessfully challenge for the vacant Chiba Six Man Tag Team Championship in a five-way gauntlet tag team match won by Happy Big Circus (Dinosaur Takuma, Kotaro Yoshino and Yuma) which also involved the teams of Go Asakawa, Kaji Tomato and Marines Mask, Kelly Sixx, DSK and One Man Kru, and Carbell Ito, Ricky Fuji and Yoshihiro Horaguchi.

=== Ice Ribbon (2012; 2023–present) ===
Shizuku was signed to Ice Ribbon in 2012. During her first tenure with the promotion, she was a one-time IW19 Champion, title which she won by defeating Tsukasa Fujimoto at 19 O'Clock Girls Pro Wrestling 127 on August 10, 2012. At Ice Ribbon New Ice Ribbon #397 ~ 6th Anniversary on June 17, 2012, she unsuccessfully challenged Neko Nitta for the Triangle Ribbon Championship in a three-way match also involving Miyako Matsumoto. At Ice Ribbon New Ice Ribbon #430 ~ Nagayo Ribbon on November 25, 2012, Shizuku teamed up with Maki Narumiya and unsuccessfully challenged Cherry and Meari Naito in the first rounds of a tournament held for both the International Ribbon Tag Team Championship and Reina World Tag Team Championship.

Shizuku made her return in the promotion at Ice Ribbon #1253 on January 8, 2023, where she defeated Tsukina Umino in singles competition.

=== Professional Wrestling Just Tap Out (2019–2021) ===
Shizuku shared a two-year tenure with Professional Wrestling Just Tap Out. She made her debut at JTO Hajime on July 8, 2019, where she fell short to Maika in singles competition. Shizuku was the inaugural Queen of JTO Champion, having defeated Tomoka Inaba in a tournament final to win the title at JTO GIRLS Tournament on December 6, 2020. She defeated Sumika Yanagawa in the semifinals the same night.

=== Pro Wrestling Evolution (2025–present) ===
In 2025, Shizuku signed with Pro-Wrestling Evolution (EVO). She made her debut at Evolution Vol. 35 on June 19, 2025, where she fell short to Zones in the first rounds of the inaugural Evolution Strong Women's Championship.

== Championships and accomplishments ==
- Ice Ribbon
  - IW19 Championship (1 time)
- New Korea Pro Wrestling Association
  - NKPWA Queen Championship (1 time)
- Other
  - TLW World Women's Tag Team Championship (1 time) – with Hailey Hatred
- Professional Wrestling Just Tap Out
  - Queen of JTO Championship (1 time, inaugural)
- Reina Joshi Puroresu
  - Reina World Tag Team Championship (2 times) – with Aliya
- Shinsyu Girls Pro Wrestling
  - SGP Openweight Championship (1 time)
