= Aya Koyama =

Japanese mixed martial artist and professional wrestler (1973–2018)

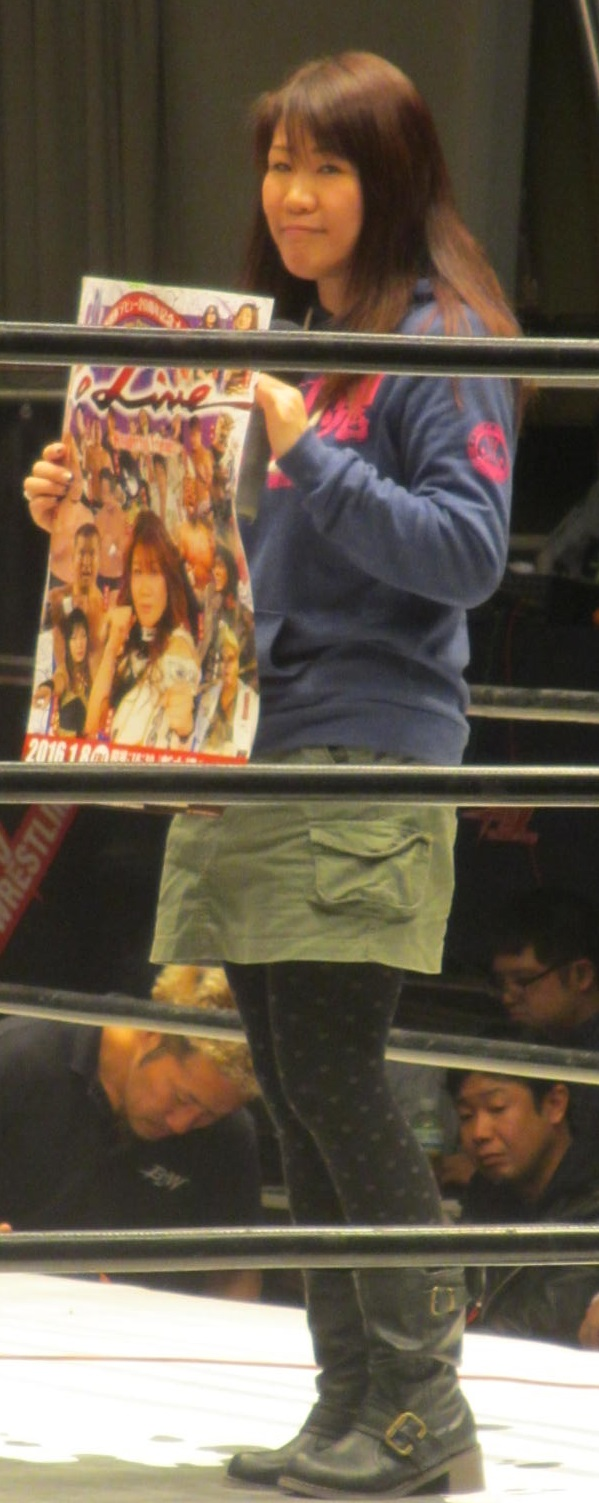
- Koyama in 2015
- Born: 8 March 1973; Wakayama, Japan
- Died: 27 August 2018 (aged 45)
- Other names: Aliya
- Nationality: Japanese
- Height: 160 cm (5 ft 3 in)
- Weight: 58 kg (128 lb; 9 st 2 lb)
- Style: Professional wrestling
- Team: AJW (1996-2001); Jd' (1996)
- Years active: 1996-2001 & 2005-2008 (wrestling); 2001-2004 & 2010 (MMA)

Mixed martial arts record
- Total: 15
- Wins: 4
- By knockout: 0
- By submission: 4
- By decision: 0
- Losses: 10
- By knockout: 0
- By submission: 6
- By decision: 4
- Draws: 1

Other information
- Occupation: wrestler, mixed martial artist
- Mixed martial arts record from Sherdog
- Last updated on: August 28, 2018

Aya Koyama (小山 亜矢, Koyama Aya; 8 March 1973 – 27 August 2018), better known by her stage name Aliya (亜利弥’), was a Japanese female mixed martial artist and a professional wrestler. She started her career as a pro wrestler in 1996 before starting to compete in mixed martial arts from 2001.

== Career ==
She debuted on April 14, 1996 as a professional wrestler with JDStar and later competed for promotions such as All Japan Women's Pro Wrestling and Big Japan Pro Wrestling. In 2001, she took a brief break from professional wrestling to focus in the mixed martial arts. However, she returned to wrestling in 2005 by using the name "Aliya". She wrestled her last match in 2017.

She began competing professionally in MMA from May 2001 and lost her opening match to Anna Kopyrina (on 3 May 2001). She faced disastrous start during her mixed martial arts career by losing her first five consecutive matches and ended her career with 4 wins, 10 losses and 1 draw (4-10-1). She fought her last MMA match while she was battling with level 4 cancer on 10 October 2010 following her comeback to mixed martial arts after six years and lost it to Miki Morifuji.

== Death ==
Aya Koyama died on 27 August 2018 at the age of 45 due to cancer.

== Mixed martial arts record ==
Professional record breakdown
14 matches	3 wins	10 losses
By knockout	0	0
By submission	3	6
By decision	0	4
Draws	1	

Aya Koyama mixed martial arts record
Res.	Record	Opponent	Method	Event	Date	Round	Time	Location	Notes
Loss	4–10–1	Miki Morifuji	Submission (Rear-Naked Choke)	Jewels – 10th Ring	10 October 2010	1	1:51		
Win	4–9–1	Akiko Naito	Submission (Armbar)	GCM – Cross Section 1	18 April 2004	2	1:09		
Draw	3–9–1	Hiromi Takahashi	Draw	AJWPW – Tag League: The Best	19 December 2003	2	5:00		
Loss	3–9–0	Izumi Noguchi	Decision (Unanimous)	Smackgirl – Third Season 3	7 May 2003	2	5:00		
Loss	3–8–0	Naoko Torashima	Submission (Armbar)	Arkadia – Arkadia	29 March 2003	1	6:28		
Loss	3–7–0	Maiko Okado	Submission (Heel Hook)	Smackgirl – Third Season 1	3 March 2003	1	3:39		
Win	3–6–0	Hiromi Kanai	Submission (Scarf Hold Armlock)	Smackgirl – Japan Cup 2002 Grand Final	29 December 2002	2	2:27		
Loss	2–6–0	Mari Kaneko	Decision (Unanimous)	Smackgirl – Japan Cup 2002 Opening Round	5 October 2002	3	5:00		
Win	2–5–0	Naomi Kawamata	Submission (Armbar)	Smackgirl – Summer Gate 2002	4 August 2002	1	2:30		
Loss	1–5–0	Yoko Takahashi	Submission (Guillotine Choke)	Zero1 – Impossible to Escape	7 July 2002	1	1:43		
Loss	1–4–0	Asako Saioka	Decision (Unanimous)	Smackgirl – Golden Gate 2002	6 May 2002	3	5:00		
Loss	1–3–0	Satoko Shinashi	Submission (Armbar)	Ax – Vol. 2: We Want To Shine	26 December 2001	1	2:29		
Loss	1–2–0	Yuuki Kondo	Decision (Unanimous)	Smackgirl – Fighting Chance	28 June 2001	3	5:00		
Loss	0–2–0	Anna Kopyrina	Technical Submission (Armbar)	ReMix – Golden Gate 2001	3 May 2001	2	0:30		

== Championships and accomplishments ==
=== Professional wrestling ===
- Reina Joshi Puroresu
  - Reina World Tag Team Championship (3 times) – with Aki Shizuku (2) and Makoto (1)

== See also ==
- List of female mixed martial artists
