= Shida Night Market =

Night market in Da'an, Taipei, Taiwan

Shida Night Market 師大夜市
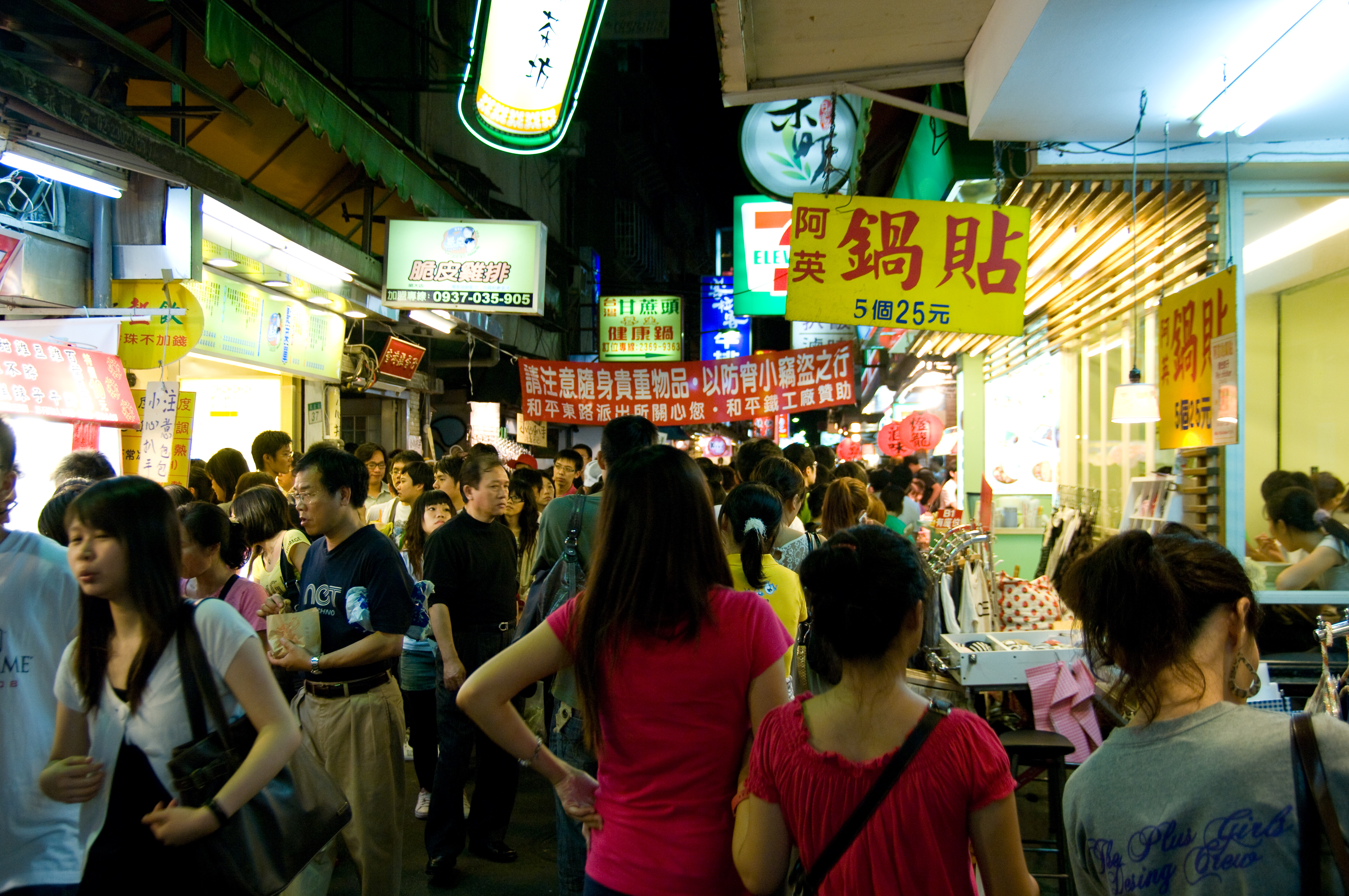
- Location: Da'an, Taipei, Taiwan; 25°01′26″N 121°31′46″E
- Environment: Night market
- Interactive map of Shida Night Market

The Shida Night Market (Chinese: 師大夜市; pinyin: Shīdà Yèshì) is a night market in Da'an District, Taipei, Taiwan. It is located near National Taiwan Normal University, whose name in Chinese is pronounced phonetically as Shida.

Shida night market was a very popular night market given its unique shops, restaurants and fashionable clothing stores. However, as the area Shida night market occupied is close to National Taiwan Normal University, it has always been a place that many intellectuals called home. Due to resident complaints regarding the noise, trash, and people the night market attracted to the area, as well as government rezoning efforts, Shida night market is now much smaller than it used to be.

Even though it is much smaller, Shida night market still retains its unique feel compared to other night markets.

== Features ==
Many fashion accessories are sold here by a variety of businesses. Pork buns, pineapple buns, and crepes can also be found. Prices are relatively low, due to the large number of students that shop here.

== Transportation ==
The night market is accessible by walking 500m (1600ft) north of Exit 3 of the Taipower Building Station of the Taipei Metro.

== Around the market ==
National Taiwan Normal University (next to the market)

Shida Triangle Park (100m to the west)

Taishun Market (200m to the east)

Wenzhou Market (250m to the northeast)

Guzhuang Park (400m to the southwest)

Longquan Market (500m to the south)

National Taiwan University (750m to the southeast)

Daan Forest Park (800m to the northeast)

Taipei City Hakka Cultural Park (800m to the southwest)

Nanchang Road Night Market (1.3km to the northwest)

Dongmen Market (1.4km to the northwest)

Guting Riverside Park (1.5km to the southwest)

Nanmen Market (1.6km to the northwest)

Gongguan Night Market (1.7km to the southeast)

Chiang Kai-shek Memorial Hall (1.7km to the northwest)

Jianguo Weekend Flower Market (1.9km to the northeast)
