= Reina World Tag Team Championship =

Professional wrestling women's tag team championship

Details
- Promotion: Reina Joshi Puroresu
- Date established: September 24, 2011
- Date retired: March 10, 2018
Statistics
- First champions: La Comandante and Zeuxis
- Final champions: Silueta and Syuri
- Most reigns: As a tag team (2 reigns): Muscle Venus (Hikaru Shida and Tsukasa Fujimoto); Aki Shizuku and Aliya; As individual (3 reigns): Aliya; Hikaru Shida; Makoto; Zeuxis
- Longest reign: Hikaru Shida and Tsukasa Fujimoto (172 days)
- Shortest reign: Hikaru Shida and Tsukasa Fujimoto (2 days)

The Reina World Tag Team Championship (Campeonato Mundial en Parejas de Reina in Spanish; Reina Sekai Taggu Ōza (Reina世界タッグ王座) in Japanese) was a professional wrestling Tag team championship promoted by Reina Joshi Puroresu. The championship was created in September 2011 in Universal Woman's Pro Wrestling Reina (UWWR) promotion. Through UWWR's working relationship with Consejo Mundial de Lucha Libre (CMLL), CMLL wrestlers have also competed for the title. Following the dissolution of UWWR in May 2012, the title moved over to Reina X World, later renamed Reina Joshi Puroresu.

== History ==
Teams:

- Canadian NINJAs (Nicole Matthews and Portia Perez)
- Mia Yim and Sara Del Rey
- La Comandante and Zeuxis
- Aki Kanbayashi and Saya

Semifinals
Canadian NINJAs (Nicole Matthews and Portia Perez)	Pin
Mia Yim and Sara Del Rey
La Comandante and Zeuxis	Pin
Aki Kanbayashi and Saya

Finals
La Comandante and Zeuxis	Pin
Canadian NINJAs (Nicole Matthews and Portia Perez)

== Reigns ==
Key
No.	Overall reign number
Reign	Reign number for the specific team—reign numbers for the individuals are in parentheses, if different
Days	Number of days held

No.	Champion	Championship change			Reign statistics		Notes	Ref.
No.	Champion	Date	Event	Location	Reign	Days	Notes	Ref.
1	La Comandante and Zeuxis	September 13, 2011	Reina 15	Yokohama, Kanagawa, Japan	1	84	Comandante and Zeuxis defeated the Canadian NINJAs (Nicole Matthews and Portia Perez) in the finals of a four–team tournament to become the inaugural champions.	
2	Lluvia and Luna Mágica	December 6, 2011	CMLL on CadenaTres	Mexico City, Mexico	1	109	This was a two out of three falls match.	
3	Mima Shimoda and Zeuxis	March 24, 2012	Reina 29	Tokyo, Japan	1 (1, 2)	50		
—	Vacated	May 13, 2012	Reina 33	Tokyo, Japan	—	—	Shimoda and Zeuxis vacated the title, when Universal Woman's Pro Wrestling Reina folded and Shimoda chose not to join Reina X World.	
4	Muscle Venus (Hikaru Shida and Tsukasa Fujimoto)	June 9, 2012	Reina X World 1	Tokyo, Japan	1	172	Muscle Venus defeated Aki Kanbayashi and Mia Yim in the finals of a four-team tournament to win the vacant championship.	
5	Hailey Hatred and Hamuko Hoshi	November 28, 2012	Ice Ribbon 431	Saitama, Japan	1	21	This match was also contested for the International Ribbon Tag Team Championship.	
6	Kyoko Kimura and Sayaka Obihiro	December 19, 2012	Ice Ribbon 434	Saitama, Japan	1	12	This match was also contested for the International Ribbon Tag Team Championship.	
7	Seishun Midori (Aoi Kizuki and Tsukushi)	December 31, 2012	RibbonMania 2012	Tokyo, Japan	1	145	This match was also contested for the International Ribbon Tag Team Championship.	
8	Muscle Venus (Hikaru Shida and Tsukasa Fujimoto)	May 25, 2013	Yokohama Radiant Hall Tournament	Yokohama, Japan	2	2	This match was also contested for the International Ribbon Tag Team Championship.	
—	Vacated	May 27, 2013	—	—	—	—	Shida and Fujimoto, who were affiliated with the Ice Ribbon promotion, returned the title to Reina Joshi Puroresu, following a change in its management.	
9	La Vaquerita and Zeuxis	September 8, 2013	Reina Joshi Puroresu Lazona Kawasaki Plaza	Kawasaki, Kanagawa, Japan	1 (1, 3)	55	Vaquerita and Zeuxis defeated Leon and Rydeen Hagane in the finals of a four-team tournament to win the vacant championship.	
10	Aki Shizuku and Aliya	November 2, 2013	Reina Joshi Puroresu Shin-Kiba 1st Ring	Tokyo, Japan	1	50		
11	Mascara Voladoras (Leon and Ray)	December 22, 2013	Reina Joshi Puroresu Shin-Kiba 1st Ring Tournament	Tokyo, Japan	1	96		
—	Vacated	March 28, 2014	—	Tokyo, Japan	—	—	The championship was vacated.	
12	Shiritsu Puroresu Gakuen (Kaho Kobayashi and Makoto)	April 27, 2014	Reina Shin-Kiba Tournament	Tokyo, Japan	1	28	Shiritsu Puroresu Gakuen defeated Aki Shizuku and Ariya in the finals of an eight-team tournament to win the vacant championship.	
13	Aki Shizuku and Aliya	May 25, 2014	Reina Shin-Kiba Tournament	Tokyo, Japan	2	35		
14	Bousou-gun (La Comandante and Yumiko Hotta)	June 29, 2014	Reina Shin-Kiba Tournament	Tokyo, Japan	1 (2, 1)	52		
15	Ariya and Makoto	August 20, 2014	CMLL-Reina Fiesta 2014	Tokyo, Japan	1 (3, 2)	50		
—	Vacated	August 20, 2014	Reina Shin-Kiba Tournament	Tokyo, Japan	—	—	The championship was declared vacant by Kana.	
16	Arisa Nakajima and Kana	November 20, 2014	Reina Shin-Kiba Tournament	Tokyo, Japan	1	97	Kana and Nakajima defeated Lin Byron and Syuri in the finals of a four-team tournament to win the vacant championship.	
17	Hikaru Shida and Syuri	February 25, 2015	KanaProMania: Advance	Tokyo, Japan	1 (3, 1)	108		
18	Piero-gun (Makoto and Rina Yamashita)	June 13, 2015	Battle Force 2015	Tokyo, Japan	1 (3, 1)	118		
19	Silueta and Syuri	October 9, 2015	Autumn Fest 2015	Tokyo, Japan	1 (1, 2)	159		
—	Vacated	March 16, 2016	—	—	—	—	The championship vacated due to Syuri announcing her resignation from Reina.	
—	Deactivated	March 10, 2018	—	—	—	—	The championship deactivated on this date.	

== Combined reigns ==
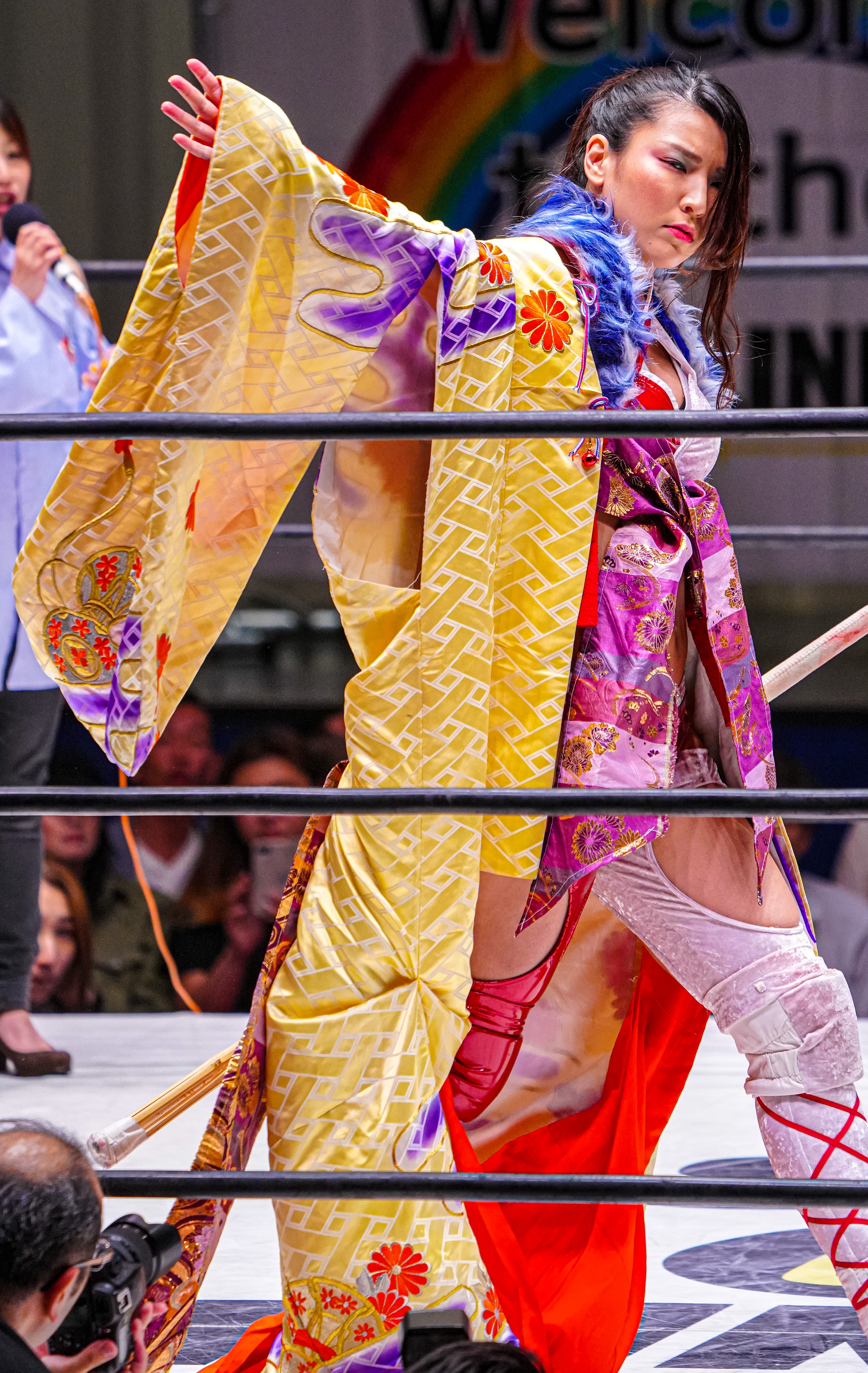
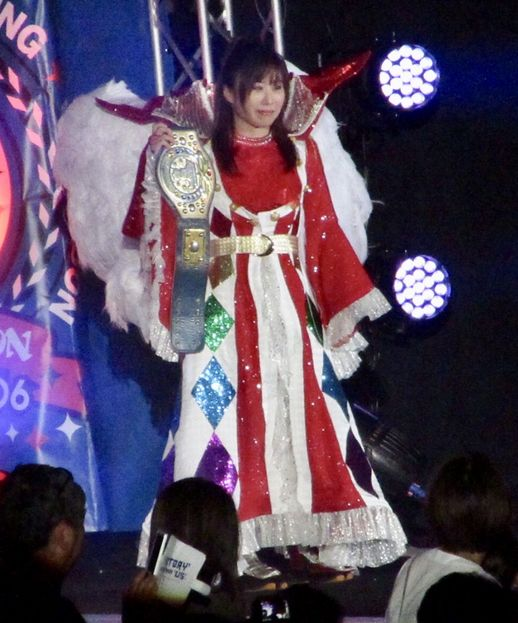
Longest reigning champions Hikaru Shida (left) and Tsukasa Fujimoto (right)

=== By team ===
Rank	Team	No. of reigns	Combined days
1	Muscle Venus (Hikaru Shida and Tsukasa Fujimoto)	2	174
2	Silueta and Syuri	1	159
3	Seishun Midori (Aoi Kizuki and Tsukushi)	1	145
4	Piero-gun (Makoto and Rina Yamashita)	1	118
5	Lluvia and Luna Mágica	1	109
6	Hikaru Shida and Syuri	1	108
7	Arisa Nakajima and Kana	1	97
8	Mascara Voladoras (Leon and Ray)	1	96
9	Aki Shizuku and Aliya	2	85
10	La Comandante and Zeuxis	1	84
11	La Vaquerita and Zeuxis	1	55
12	Bousou-gun (La Comandante and Yumiko Hotta)	1	52
13	Aliya and Makoto	1	50
13	Mima Shimoda and Zeuxis	1	50
15	Shiritsu Puroresu Gakuen (Kaho Kobayashi and Makoto)	1	28
16	Hailey Hatred and Hamuko Hoshi	1	21
17	Kyoko Kimura and Sayaka Obihiro	1	12

=== By wrestler ===
Rank	Wrestler	No. of reigns	Combined days
1	Hikaru Shida	3	282
2	Syuri	2	267
3	Makoto	3	196
4	Tsukasa Fujimoto	2	174
5	Silueta	1	159
6	Aoi Kizuki	1	145
6	Tsukushi	1	145
8	Zeuxis	3	189
9	Aliya	3	140
10	La Comandante	2	136
11	Rina Yamashita	1	118
12	Lluvia	1	109
12	Luna Mágica	1	109
14	Arisa Nakajima	1	97
14	Kana	1	97
16	Leon	1	96
16	Ray	1	96
18	Aki Shizuku	2	85
19	La Vaquerita	1	55
20	Yumiko Hotta	1	52
21	Mima Shimoda	1	50
22	Kaho Kobayashi	1	28
23	Hailey Hatred	1	21
23	Hamuko Hoshi	1	21
25	Kyoko Kimura	1	12
25	Sayaka Obihiro	1	12

== See also ==
- International Ribbon Tag Team Championship
- WWE Women's Tag Team Championship
- Oz Academy Tag Team Championship
- Wave Tag Team Championship
- Goddesses of Stardom Championship
- Women's World Tag Team Championship
