= Shida, Taipei =

Neighborhood of Taipei, Taiwan

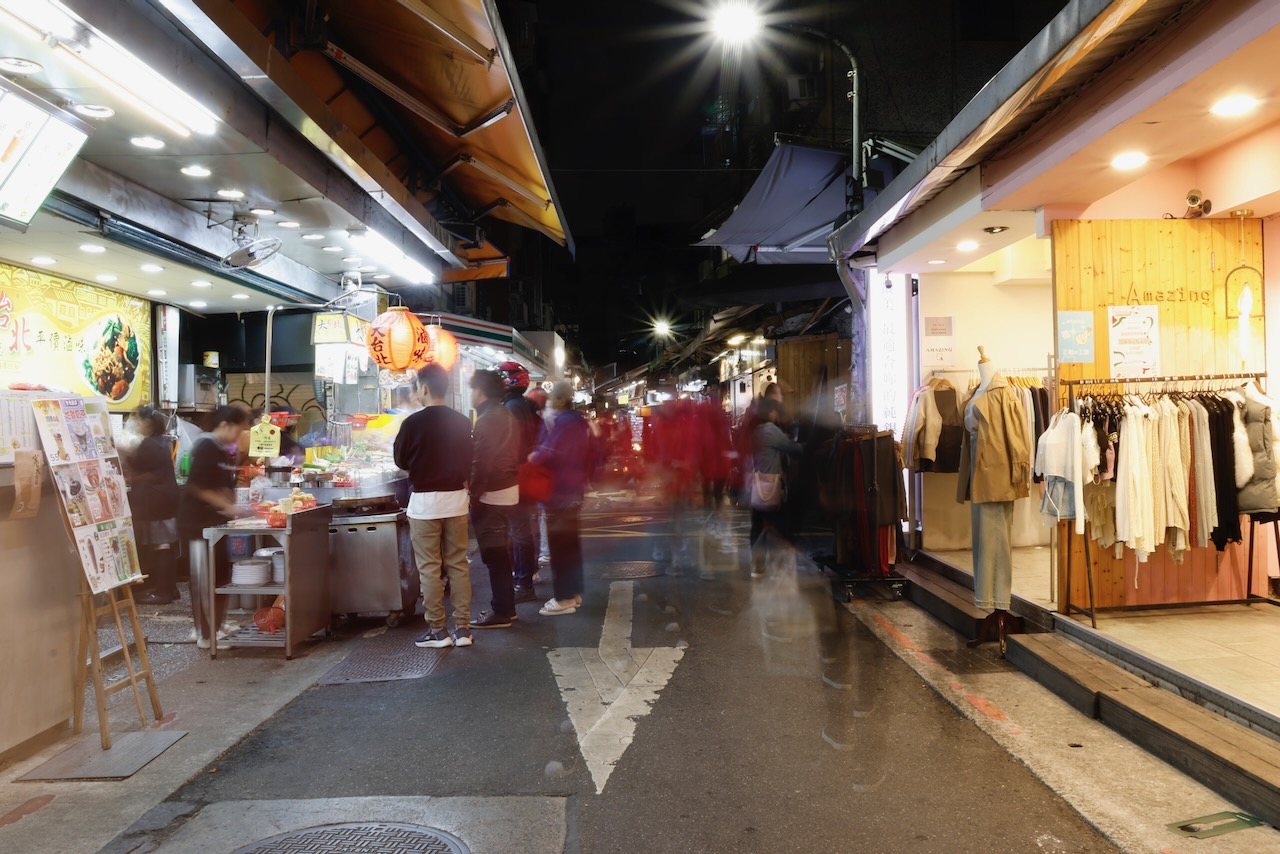
Shida night market in the Shida neighborhood.

Shida (Chinese: 師大) is a neighborhood in Daan District, Taipei, Taiwan. It is located adjacent to the southern end of Yongkang Street. It houses the main campus of National Taiwan Normal University (國立臺灣師範大學; hence the name of the neighborhood), making it an area with a high percentage of both Taiwanese and international students. Shida is primarily served by Taipei Metro Guting Station.

== Places in Shida ==
- National Taiwan Normal University
- Shida Night Market
