= Muscle Girl! =

- マッスルガール!
- Genre: Comedy, Drama, Sports
- Starring: Yui Ichikawa; Lee Hong-gi
- Country of origin: Japan
- Original language: Japanese
- No. of episodes: 10

Production
- Running time: 24 minutes

Original release
- Network: MBS, TBS
- Release: 19 April – 21 June 2011

Muscle Girl! (マッスルガール!) is a Japanese drama.

== Synopsis ==
Azusa Shiratori (Yui Ichikawa) is the only child of the president of "Shiratori Girls Pro Wrestling" - a small female professional wrestling league. After the death of her father from an illness, Azusa struggles to keep the wrestling league afloat. The company is near bankruptcy with large debts. On the day of a wrestling match, the referee leaves behind a brief note stating that he quit. He also disappears without a trace. Azusa is now in a serious jam, needing a replacement referee. Azusa then stumbles across a Korean guy (Lee Hong-gi) she meets on the street. She persuades the man to become a referee for just one day. Unbeknown to Azusa, the man is also a popular star in South Korea. In order to keep "Shiratori Girls Pro Wrestling" afloat, they then join forces to go up against a rival pro-wrestling organization.

== Cast ==
- Yui Ichikawa as Shiratori Azusa
- Lee Hong-gi as Yoo Ji Ho
- Kensei Mikami as Gohara Koji
- Hikaru Yamamoto as Sudo Tsukasa
- Saki Akai as Himawari
- Vanessa Aya as Uonuma Mai
- Hikaru Shida as Hoshi Kaoru
- Keiko Koike as Skull Kyoko
- Nobuyoshi Kuwano as Kurogane Nobuhiro
- Fukumi Kuroda as Lee Soon Ja
