= Tsukasa Fujimoto =

Japanese professional wrestler and actress

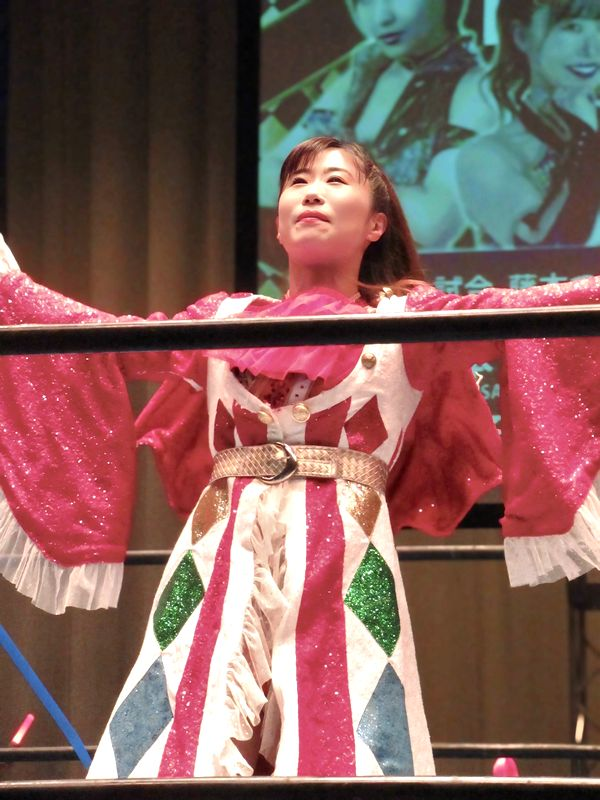
- Fujimoto in July 2024

Personal information
- Born: July 30, 1983 (age 43) Rifu, Miyagi, Japan

Professional wrestling career
- Ring name(s): Mask de Tsukka; Mio-fu Fujimoto; Tsukasa; Tsukasa Fujimoto; Tsukkamaru
- Billed height: 1.58 m (5 ft 2 in)
- Billed weight: 48 kg (106 lb)
- Trained by: Emi Sakura
- Debut: August 23, 2008

Tsukasa Fujimoto (藤本 つかさ, Fujimoto Tsukasa; born July 30, 1983) is a Japanese joshi professional wrestler and actress. She is signed for Ice Ribbon as a wrestler and as the co-head trainer of their training facility.

She is a record seven-time ICE×∞ Champion, six-time International Ribbon Tag Team Champion and a two-time Internet Wrestling 19 (IW19) Champion, making her Ice Ribbon's third Triple Crown Champion. Fujimoto holds several records in Ice Ribbon, including most reigns as both the ICE×60/ICE×∞ and IW19 Champion, being the last IW19 Champion by unifying the title with the ICE×60 Championship in July 2013, having the longest reign and most successful title defenses as the ICE×60/ICE×∞ Champion and being the only wrestler in history to have held all four of the promotion's titles.

Fujimoto has also made appearances for JWP Joshi Puroresu, where she is a former one-time holder of the Daily Sports Women's Tag Team and JWP Tag Team Championships, Pro Wrestling Wave, where she is a former one-time Wave Tag Team Champion and the winner of the 2012 Dual Shock Wave tournament, and Reina Joshi Puroresu, where she is a former one-time Reina World Women's Champion and a two-time Reina World Tag Team Champion.

Fujimoto is the handpicked successor to Manami Toyota, who handed her the nickname of "Flying Angel" and her Japanese Ocean Cyclone Suplex finishing maneuver upon her November 2017 retirement from professional wrestling. Fujimoto also defeated Toyota in her final match.

== Early life ==
Fujimoto was born in Rifu, Miyagi, but spent much of her youth moving between Miyagi, Tokyo, Yamagata and Yonezawa due to her father's work, changing elementary school four times. After graduating from Tohoku Fukushi University, Fujimoto began her professional life as an actress, most notably working on the television series Muscle Venus, forming an idol group with fellow cast members Hikaru Shida, Hina Kozuki, Ichiko Mayu, Miyako Matsumoto, Sachiko Koga, Tomoyo Morihisa, Yuki Ueda and Yuri Natsume. She has a sports background in soccer, basketball and athletics and has since 2007 regularly played futsal in the celebrity team Nankatsu Shooters. In 2008, the Muscle Venus group, excluding Kozuki and Natsume, was cast in a film titled Three Count, set in the world of professional wrestling and also starring veteran professional wrestlers Emi Sakura, Kyoko Inoue and Yoshiko Tamura. As part of their roles, all members began training professional wrestling under Sakura at her Ice Ribbon dojo.

== Professional wrestling career ==
=== Ice Ribbon (2008–present) ===
Fujimoto made her debut for Ice Ribbon on August 23, 2008, defeating Haruna Akagi. Though all Muscle Venus members made their debuts around the same time, only Fujimoto, Hikaru Shida and Miyako Matsumoto lasted more than six months, making new careers out of professional wrestling. Unlike many other rookies, Fujimoto began winning matches early on, suffering her first big loss on December 23, losing to Makoto in the semifinals of a tournament to determine the inaugural ICE×60 Champion. The following year, Fujimoto formed the tag team Muscle Venus with Hikaru Shida, the name paying tribute to television series the two had acted in together. On June 27, Fujimoto defeated Makoto in a rematch to become the number one contender to the ICE×60 Championship, but would be defeated by the defending champion, Kiyoko Ichiki, on July 11. Fujimoto received another shot at the title on October 30, but was again defeated by Emi Sakura.

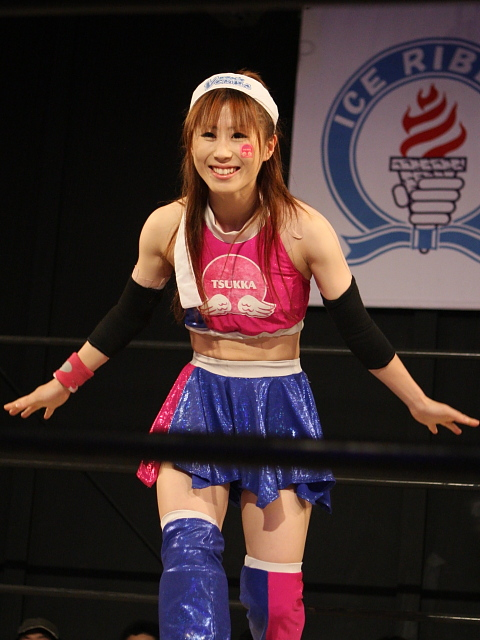
Fujimoto in July 2010

On December 31, Fujimoto entered the Super Ice-Cup tournament, defeating Mai Ichii in her first round match. On January 4, 2010, Fujimoto first defeated Hikaru Shida in the semifinals and then Emi Sakura in the finals to not only win the Super Ice-Cup, but to also become the new ICE×60 Champion. After successful defenses against Hamuko Hoshi, Makoto and Hikari Minami, Fujimoto lost the title to Miyako Matsumoto on March 21. For most of 2010, Fujimoto was involved with NEO Japan Ladies Pro Wrestling performer Natsuki☆Taiyo, first as her partner and then opposite her, unsuccessfully challenging her for the NEO High Speed Championship on May 3. On October 20, Fujimoto and Shida received their first shot at the International Ribbon Tag Team Championship, but were defeated by Emi Sakura and Nanae Takahashi. On December 11, Fujimoto became a champion again, when she defeated Kazumi Shimouma and Hamuko Hoshi for the Triangle Ribbon Championship. Just two weeks later on December 23, Fujimoto and Shida defeated Sakura and Takahashi in a rematch to become the new International Ribbon Tag Team Champions. Fujimoto's December was capped off three days later, when she defeated Command Bolshoi to regain the ICE×60 Championship, meaning that she now held all three Ice Ribbon championships simultaneously. Fujimoto and Shida went on to successfully defend the International Tag Team Championship against Hikari Minami and Riho on January 4, 2011, and against the teams of Mochi Miyagi and Ryo Mizunami, and Makoto and Riho on February 6, winning the "Ike! Ike! Ima, Ike! Ribbon Tag Tournament" in the process. In early 2011, Fujimoto began feuding with Ice Ribbon newcomer Ray, starting on February 26, when Ray pinned Fujimoto in a tag team match, only her second match in the promotion. On March 2, Ray challenged Fujimoto for the Triangle Ribbon Championship in a three-way match, which also included Chii Tomiya. The match ended with both Fujimoto and Ray simultaneously pinning Tomiya, which resulted in Fujimoto being stripped of the title. She would regain the title three days later by defeating Hikaru Shida and Makoto. On March 19, Ray and Emi Sakura defeated Fujimoto and Shida in a non-title match and afterwards laid a challenge for the International Ribbon Tag Team Championship. On March 21, Fujimoto successfully defended the ICE×60 Championship against Ray. However, five days later, Ray and Sakura defeated Fujimoto and Shida for the International Ribbon Tag Team Championship, ending Muscle Venus' reign at 93 days and breaking Fujimoto's Triple Crown. On June 29, Fujimoto lost the Triangle Ribbon Championship to Neko Nitta in a match that also included Ray.

On July 30, 2011, Fujimoto made her American debut, when she teamed with Mima Shimoda and Portia Perez to defeat Daizee Haze, Makoto and Sara Del Rey at a Chikara event in Reading, Pennsylvania. The following day, Fujimoto defeated Makoto in an "Ice Ribbon Showcase" match at the Asylum Arena in Philadelphia, Pennsylvania. After seven successful defenses and a record-setting reign of 238 days, Fujimoto lost the ICE×60 Championship to Hikari Minami on August 21. The following month, Fujimoto and Shida attempted to regain the International Ribbon Tag Team Championship, but were defeated in the semifinals of a tournament for the vacant title by Manami Toyota and Tsukushi. In October, Fujimoto and Shida, along with Emi Sakura and Hikari Minami, traveled to Nottingham, England to take part in events promoted by Pro Wrestling EVE and Southside Wrestling Entertainment (SWE). During 2011, Fujimoto also took part in Ice Ribbon's interpromotional rivalry with the Sendai Girls' Pro Wrestling promotion. On October 27, Fujimoto, Emi Sakura, Hikari Minami, Hikaru Shida and Tsukushi represented Ice Ribbon in Sendai's Joshi Puroresu Dantai Taikou Flash tournament, a single-elimination tournament, where different joshi promotions battled each other. The team was eliminated from the tournament in the first round by Team Sendai (Meiko Satomura, Dash Chisako, Kagetsu, Miyako Morino and Sendai Sachiko). On November 19, Fujimoto defeated Hikari Minami to win the ICE×60 Championship for the third time. Following the event, Hikaru Shida was named Fujimoto's first challenger for the title on December 25 at RibbonMania 2011. At RibbonMania 2011, Fujimoto lost the ICE×60 Championship to Shida.

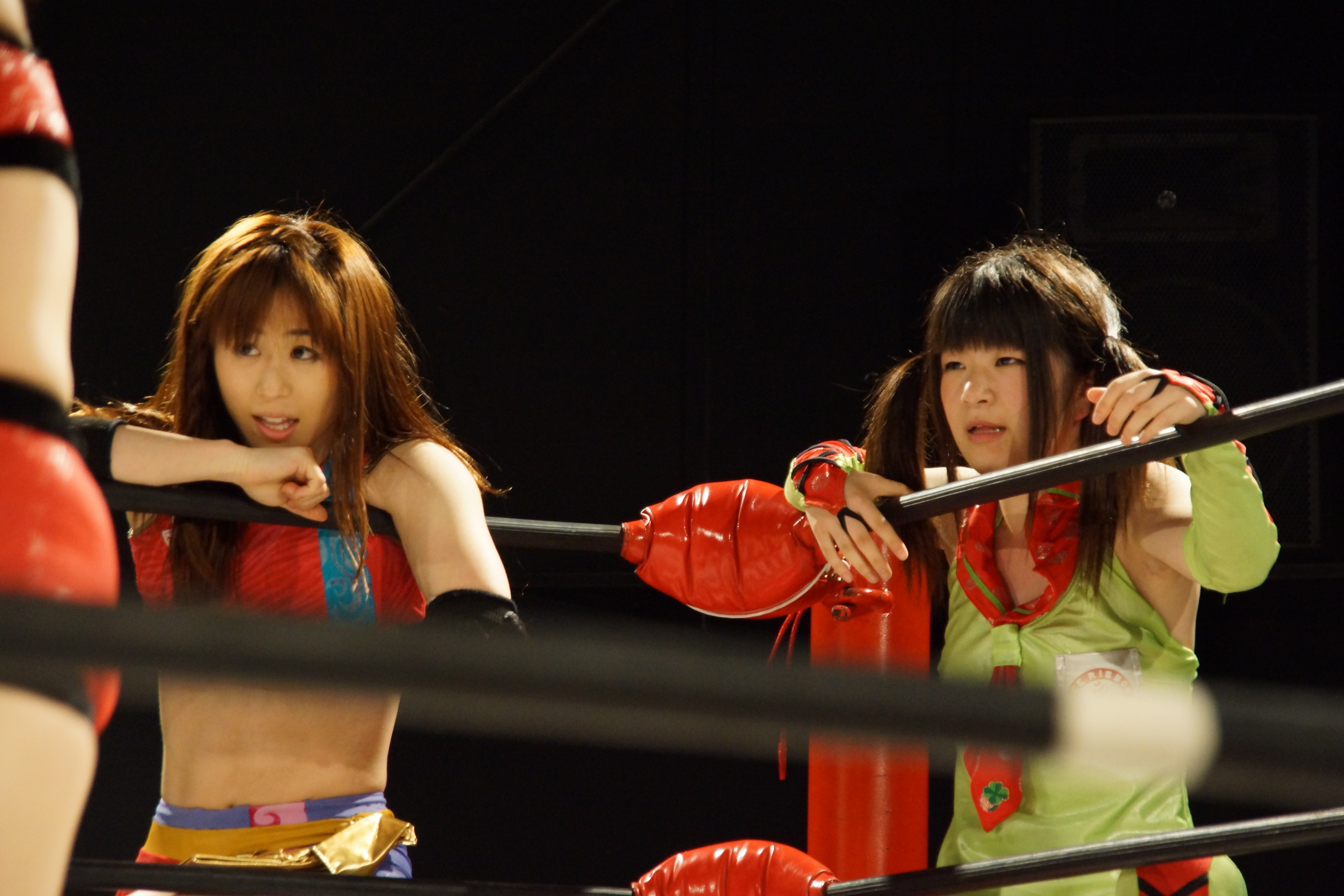
Fujimoto and Tsukushi, the Dropkickers, in April 2012

After submitting Maki Narumiya in a singles match on January 29, 2012, Fujimoto was granted a shot at her and Hikaru Shida's International Ribbon Tag Team Championship. On February 1, Fujimoto main evented a Pro Wrestling Wave event, losing to Toshie Uematsu as part of her retirement tour. On February 5, Fujimoto and Tsukushi, the team dubbed "Dropkickers", defeated Shida and Narumiya to become the new International Ribbon Tag Team Champions, with Fujimoto pinning the ICE×60 Champion in the process. Fujimoto and Tsukushi made their first title defense on March 20, defeating the team of Kurumi and Manami Toyota. On March 24, Fujimoto made her debut for the Universal Woman's Pro Wrestling Reina promotion, defeating fellow Ice Ribbon worker Neko Nitta in the opening match of Reina.29. On May 5, Fujimoto and Tsukushi lost the International Ribbon Tag Team Championship to the Happy Makers (Aoi Kizuki and Sayaka Obihiro) in the main event of Golden Ribbon 2012, ending their reign at 90 days. Fujimoto wrestled the match against her doctor's orders, having dislocated her right elbow at a Pro Wrestling Wave event five days earlier. On May 16, Fujimoto entered Pro Wrestling Wave's 2012 Catch the Wave tournament as a representative of the promotion's top villainous alliance Black Dahlia. In her opening round-robin match, Fujimoto, debuting a new black attire, defeated Black Dahlia's leader Misaki Ohata. On May 25, Fujimoto defeated Aki Shizuku in the finals of the 2nd 19 O'Clock Girls ProWrestling Tournament to become the number one contender to the IW19 Championship. On June 1, Fujimoto defeated Kurumi to win the IW19 Championship, becoming the first wrestler to have held every Ice Ribbon championship available. On June 9, Fujimoto took part in the first event of Reina X World, the follow-up promotion to Universal Woman's Pro Wrestling Reina, during which she and Hikaru Shida defeated Aki Kanbayashi and Mia Yim in the finals of a four-team tournament to win the vacant Reina World Tag Team Championship. Four days later, Fujimoto became a triple champion, when she won DDT Pro-Wrestling promotion's Ironman Heavymetalweight Championship. Taking advantage of a rule, where the champion could be pinned or submitted anytime and anywhere, Fujimoto pinned Hiroyo Matsumoto for the title at an Ice Ribbon event, following a six-woman tag team match, where she, Hamuko Hoshi and Hikaru Shida had defeated Matsumoto, Maki Narumiya and Sayaka Obihiro. On June 16, Fujimoto made her first successful defense of the Ironman Heavymetalweight Championship, defeating DJ Nira, Masa Takanashi and Tomomitsu Matsunaga in a four-person battle royal at a DDT event, and afterwards also survived a backstage ambush from Matsunaga to leave the arena as the champion. The following day, Fujimoto and Tsukushi defeated the Happy Makers at Ice Ribbon's sixth anniversary event to regain the International Ribbon Tag Team Championship, making Fujimoto a quadruple champion. On June 23, Fujimoto lost the Ironman Heavymetalweight Championship to her tag team partner Tsukushi, who pinned her after a match, but shortly afterwards comically regained the title from one of Ice Ribbon's ring mats. The following day, Fujimoto returned to DDT to defend the title in a ten-person, ten-minute battle royal. After losing the title to Hiroshi Fukuda, Fujimoto later regained the title from Tanomusaku Toba and ended the match as the reigning champion. However, immediately afterwards, Fujimoto was rolled up by Choun Shiryu, who then left the arena as the new champion. When the round-robin portion of the 2012 Catch the Wave ended, Fujimoto finished with two wins, one draw and one loss, tied at the top of the Black Dahlia block. On July 1, she was eliminated from the tournament, after losing a tiebreaker match against Yumi Ohka. Afterwards, Fujimoto continued working regularly for Wave, however, no longer representing Black Dahlia. The following week, as the reigning Reina World Tag Team Champions, Fujimoto and Shida traveled to Mexico to work for Consejo Mundial de Lucha Libre (CMLL). Working just under their given names, Tsukasa and Hikaru made their CMLL debuts on July 3 in Guadalajara, teaming with La Comandante in a six-woman tag team match, where they were defeated by Goya Kong, Luna Mágica and Silueta. Three days later, Tsukasa and Hikaru teamed with Lady Apache in Mexico City in another six-woman tag team match, where they were defeated by Dark Angel, Estrellita and Marcela. Tsukasa's and Hikaru's tour of CMLL concluded on June 8 in Mexico City, when they teamed with Princesa Sujei to defeat Dalys la Caribeña, Lluvia and Luna Mágica in a six-woman tag team match. Upon her return to Japan, Fujimoto and Tsukushi lost the International Ribbon Tag Team Championship to Miyako Matsumoto and Neko Nitta on July 15. On August 10, Fujimoto lost the IW19 Championship to Otera Pro representative Aki Shizuku in her first defense.

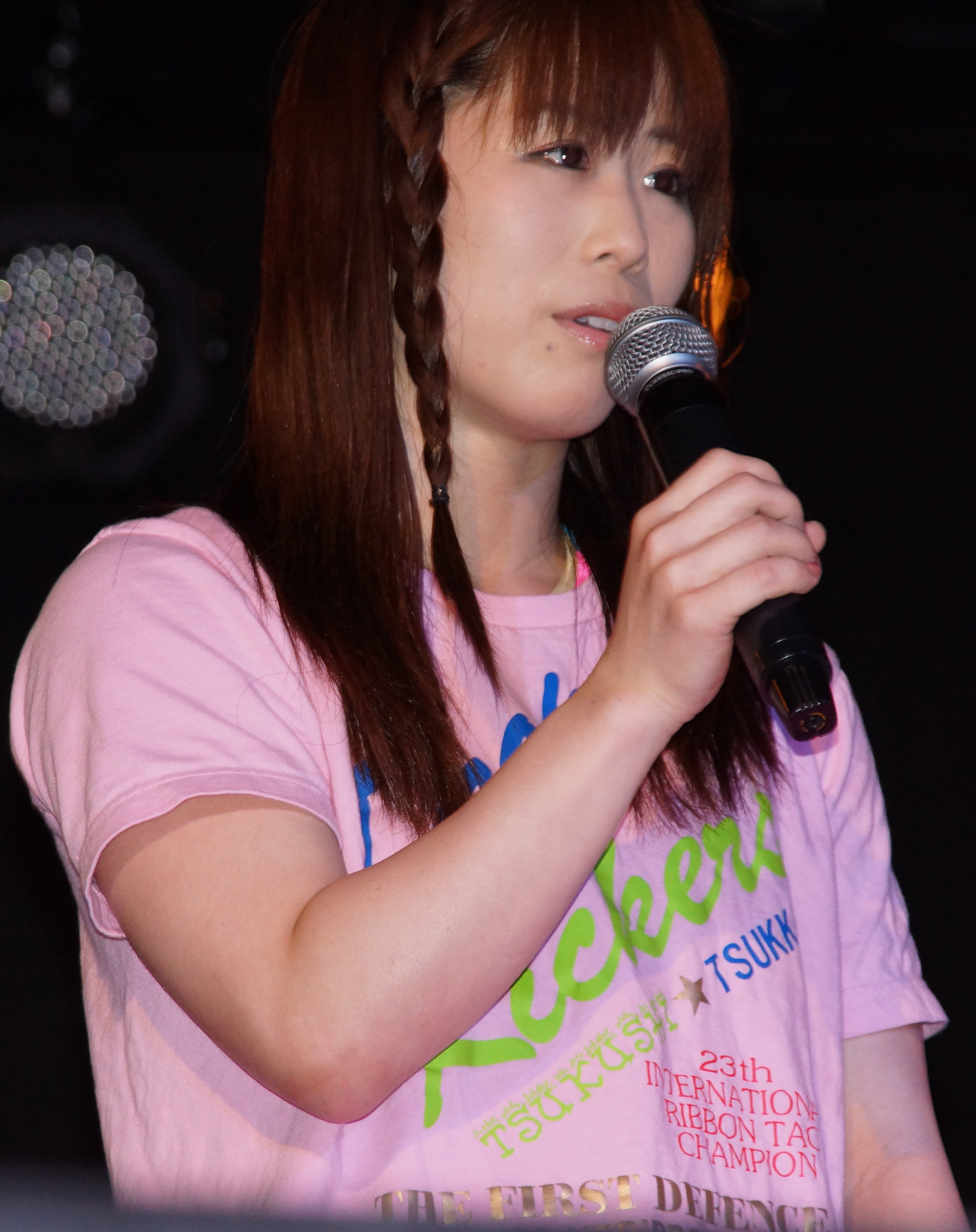
Fujimoto in April 2012

On August 18, Fujimoto took part in DDT's 15th anniversary event in Nippon Budokan, teaming with Daisuke Sasaki, Hoshitango, Masa Takanashi and Tetsuya Endo in a ten-person tag team match, contested under "Soccer rules", where they defeated Antonio Honda, Tanomusaku Toba, Yasu Urano, Yoshiko and Yuji Hino. On August 19, Ice Ribbon held a special event to celebrate Muscle Venus' fourth anniversary in professional wrestling, which saw Fujimoto and Shida defeat Maki Narumiya and Meari Naito in the main event for their first successful defense of the Reina World Tag Team Championship. Fujimoto's and Shida's second successful title defense took place back in Reina X World on August 26, when they defeated Crazy Star and Silueta. On September 22, Fujimoto and Tsukushi took part in an event, which celebrated Manami Toyota's 25th anniversary in professional wrestling, teaming with Toyota in a six-woman tag team match, where they were defeated by Aja Kong, Kyoko Inoue and Tsubasa Kuragaki. Three days later, Fujimoto returned to Pro Wrestling Wave as Misaki Ohata's partner in the 2012 Dual Shock Wave tournament, with the two wrestling Ayako Hamada and Kana to a draw in their opening round-robin match. After wins over Apple Miyuki and Kyusei Ninja Ranmaru and Wave Tag Team Champions Gami and Tomoka Nakagawa, Fujimoto and Ohata finished their round-robin block with five points, winning their block and advancing to the finals of the tournament. Following Emi Sakura's departure from Ice Ribbon at the beginning of 2012, Fujimoto and Hikaru Shida took over the promotion's training duties, and on October 19, introduced their first five trainees; Eri Wakamatsu, Fumiko Sato, Risa Okuda, Rutsuko Yamaguchi and Shoko Hotta, all set to make their debuts during the rest of the year. On October 28 at 2012 Yokohama Ribbon III, Fujimoto received the first shot at new ICE×60 Champion Mio Shirai, but ultimately failed in her challenge for the title.

On November 16, Fujimoto and Ohata defeated Shuu Shibutani and Syuri to win the 2012 Dual Shock Wave and earn a shot at the Wave Tag Team Championship. On November 25 at Nagoya Ribbon II – 2012, Fujimoto and Hikaru Shida entered a one-day tag team tournament, where they were forced to put the Reina World Tag Team Championship on the line in all of their matches. They were, however, given a bye directly to the semifinals of the tournament. After defeating Neko Nitta and Shuu Shibutani in their semifinal match, Fujimoto and Shida defeated Kurumi and Tsukushi to not only win the tournament and retain the Reina World Tag Team Championship, but to also win the International Ribbon Tag Team Championship. Two days later, Fujimoto and Misaki Ohata defeated Gami and Tomoka Nakagawa to win the Wave Tag Team Championship, making Fujimoto a triple tag team champion. However, Fujimoto's reign as a triple tag team champion was short-lived as on November 28, she and Hikaru Shida lost both the International Ribbon and Reina World Tag Team Championships to Hailey Hatred and Hamuko Hoshi. At Ice Ribbon's year-end RibbonMania 2012 event on December 31, Fujimoto and Hikaru Shida were defeated in a tag team match by World Wonder Ring Stardom representatives Nanae Takahashi and Natsuki☆Taiyo. On January 14, Fujimoto made her debut for World Wonder Ring Stardom, when she replaced a sick Eri Susa as a representative of Nanae Gundan in the Artist of Stardom Championship tournament, from which she, Miho Wakizawa and Yui Yokoo were eliminated in the first round by Kawasaki Katsushika Saikyou Densetsu Plus One (Act Yasukawa, Natsuki☆Taiyo and Saki Kashima). On January 19, Fujimoto entered a tournament to determine the new Triangle Ribbon Champion, defeating Kurumi and Tsukushi in her first round match. On January 26, Fujimoto entered another tournament, contested for the also vacant ICE×60 Championship, defeating Kurumi in her opening round-robin match. After a win over Miyako Matsumoto on February 2, Fujimoto finished her round-robin block with a loss against Hamuko Hoshi on February 9. Despite the loss, Fujimoto became the second wrestler to ensure a spot in the semifinals of the tournament. On February 11, Fujimoto was defeated in the finals of the Triangle Ribbon Championship tournament by Miyako Matsumoto in a three-way match, which also included Mio Shirai. On February 23, Fujimoto was eliminated from the ICE×60 Championship tournament in the semifinals by Tsukushi.

In March, Fujimoto and Hikaru Shida announced their goal of 2013, winning Samurai TV's "Best Unit" Award, handed to the best team in all of Japanese independent wrestling at the end of the year. On March 31, Fujimoto and Shida defeated Pro Wrestling Wave's Gami and Ryo Mizunami to advance to a match to determine the number one contenders to the International Ribbon Tag Team and Reina World Tag Team Championships. On April 21, Fujimoto and Ohata lost the Wave Tag Team Championship to Kana and Mio Shirai in their fourth title defense. On April 29, Fujimoto returned to World Wonder Ring Stardom to take part in the promotion's big Ryōgoku Cinderella event at Ryōgoku Kokugikan, teaming with Mika Nagano and Nanae Takahashi in a six-woman tag team match, where they defeated Hiroyo Matsumoto, Kaori Yoneyama and Syuri. Back in Ice Ribbon on May 4, Fujimoto and Shida defeated Hailey Hatred and Hamuko Hoshi to become the number one contenders to the International Ribbon Tag Team and Reina World Tag Team Championships. On May 25, Fujimoto and Shida defeated Aoi Kizuki and Tsukushi to win the International Ribbon Tag Team and Reina World Tag Team Championships, starting Fujimoto's record-tying fifth reign as one half of the International Ribbon Tag Team Champions. Two days later, Fujimoto and Shida relinquished the Reina World Tag Team Championship and returned the title to the Reina Joshi Puroresu promotion, which had recently undergone a change in management. On June 22, 19 O'Clock Girls ProWrestling held its first event in six months, during which Fujimoto defeated Hamuko Hoshi to win the IW19 Championship for the second time.

On July 14, the title was retired, when Fujimoto defeated Tsukushi in a championship unification match to win the ICE×60 Championship for the fourth time. Post-match, Fujimoto officially abolished the title's 60 kg (130 lb) weight limit, before nominating Manami Toyota as her first challenger. To reflect the removal of the weight limit, Fujimoto's title was renamed the ICE×∞ Championship on August 12. On August 25, Fujimoto defeated Toyota at Muscle Venus' fifth anniversary event for her first successful title defense. From September 1 to October 6, Fujimoto and Shida took part in Pro Wrestling Wave's 2013 Dual Shock Wave tournament, where they made it all the way to the finals, before losing to Ayako Hamada and Yuu Yamagata in a three-way match, which also included Kana and Yumi Ohka. In late 2013, Fujimoto reunited with Misaki Ohata and her new partner Mio Shirai to form a new three-woman stable named Kuros. The stable mainly worked in Pro Wrestling Wave, where they made it to the finals of the 6-Person Tag Tournament in November, but the alliance also carried over to Ice Ribbon. On November 17, Fujimoto made her debut for Wrestle-1, defeating her trainee Risa Sera in a singles match. Despite Hikaru Shida announcing her forthcoming departure from Ice Ribbon, she and Fujimoto continued their reign as the International Ribbon Tag Team Champions, eventually reaching their ninth successful title defense by defeating N^{3} (Maki Narumiya and Meari Naito) on March 22 in what was billed as Muscle Venus' final match together. On March 30, Fujimoto defeated longtime tag team partner Hikaru Shida in her final Ice Ribbon match. Post-match, the two relinquished the International Ribbon Tag Team Championship, ending their reign during which they set new records for both the longest reign, at 309 days, and most successful title defenses, with nine.

On April 14, the 274th day of her ICE×∞ Championship reign, Fujimoto became the longest reigning champion in the title's history by breaking Shida's previous record. From May 5 to July 4, Fujimoto took part in the round-robin portion of the 2014 Catch the Wave tournament. After starting off with two losses and a draw, Fujimoto bounced back with a win over Wave Single Champion Yumi Ohka and after subsequent wins over Kyoko Kimura and Kyusei Sakura Hirota, finished tied second in her block, advancing to a playoff match. On July 13, Fujimoto claimed the number two spot in her block and advanced to the knockout stage of the tournament, after pinning Tomoka Nakagawa in a three-way double elimination match, also involving Kyoko Kimura. On July 27, Fujimoto was eliminated from the tournament by Misaki Ohata. On September 23, Fujimoto entered the 2014 Dual Shock Wave, teaming with Yumi Ohka, playing off the two's management roles in their respective home promotions. They were, however, eliminated from the tournament in the first round by Plus Minus 2014 (Mio Shirai and Misaki Ohata). The following month, Fujimoto returned to the United States to work Shimmer Women Athletes' October 18 and 19 tapings. On the first day, she teamed with Akino and Kaori Yoneyama to defeat Kellie Skater, Mia Yim and Tomoka Nakagawa on Volume 67, before teaming with Yoneyama on Volume 68 to unsuccessfully challenge Skater and Nakagawa for the Shimmer Tag Team Championship. The following day, Fujimoto and Yoneyama defeated Nevaeh and Sassy Stephie on Volume 69, before Fujimoto ended her weekend by losing to Mia Yim on Volume 70.

Back in Ice Ribbon, Fujimoto made her ninth successful defense of the ICE×∞ Championship on November 24 against Aoi Kizuki. Following the match, Fujimoto nominated JWP Joshi Puroresu's Openweight Champion Arisa Nakajima as her next challenger. Nakajima had earlier nominated Fujimoto as her next challenger, leading to Ice Ribbon and JWP announcing a double title match for December 28 at Korakuen Hall. First at Ribbon Mania 2014, Ice Ribbon's biggest annual event, Fujimoto would defend the ICE×∞ Championship against Nakajima and six hours later at JWP–Climax 2014, JWP's biggest event of the year, Nakajima would defend the JWP Openweight Championship against Fujimoto. On November 26, Kuros won Pro Wrestling Wave's second annual One Day 6-Person Tag Tournament, defeating Cherry, Meari Naito and Shuu Shibutani in the finals and, as a result, earned the right to produce the December 14 Wave event. In the first title match on December 28 at Ribbon Mania 2014, Fujimoto made her tenth successful defense of the ICE×∞ Championship against Nakajima, tying Emi Sakura's record for most successful defenses in the title's history. Later that same day at JWP–Climax 2014, Fujimoto failed in her attempt to capture the JWP Openweight Championship from Nakajima. On January 4, 2015, Fujimoto made her eleventh successful defense of the ICE×∞ Championship against Risa Sera, setting a new record for most successful defenses in the title's history. Fujimoto's twenty-month reign as the ICE×∞ Champion ended on March 21, when she was defeated by Kurumi in her twelfth title defense. On April 1, Fujimoto was appointed to the Ice Ribbon board of directors as a representative of the wrestlers.

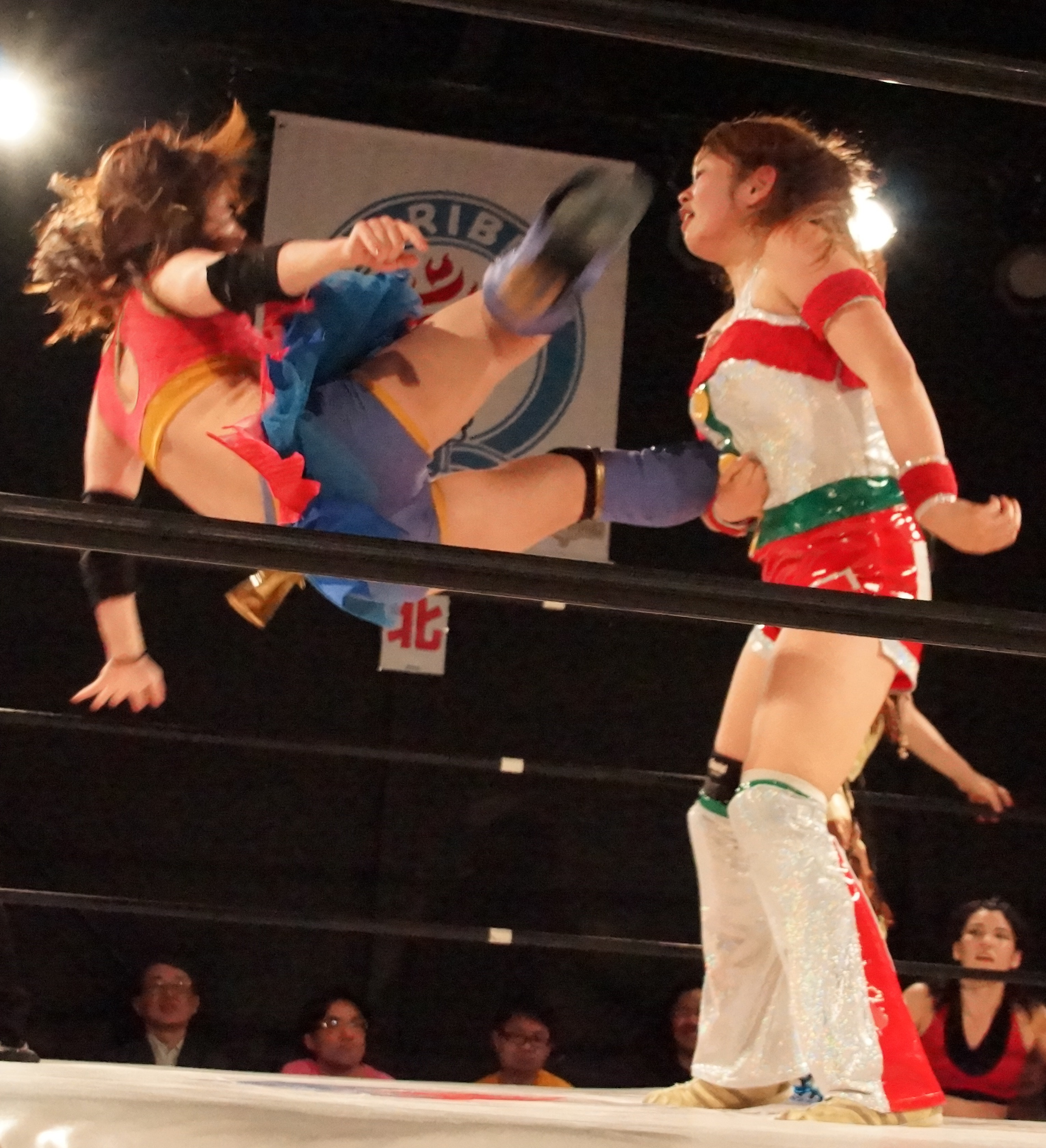
Fujimoto performing an enzuigiri on Aoi Kizuki

In June 2015, Fujimoto formed a tag team named Best Friends with JWP wrestler Arisa Nakajima, with the two stating that their goal was to become the top tag team in all of joshi puroresu. On July 29, Fujimoto celebrated her 32nd birthday with a gauntlet match, featuring 32 participants from both Ice Ribbon and outside of the promotion. She finished the match with eight wins, four losses and twenty time-limit draws. Afterwards, Manami Toyota, the final entrant in the match, endorsed Fujimoto as her successor, giving her the right to her Japanese Ocean finishing maneuvers and officially dubbing her the second generation "Flying Angel". On August 20, Kuros produced their final independent event, before the stable's dissolution, where Fujimoto, Ohata and Shirai defeated Chikayo Nagashima, Kayoko Haruyama and Meiko Satomura in a six-woman tag team main event. With Kuros done, Fujimoto found herself a new stable in Fairy Nipponbashi's Wonderful World Fairy Family (WWFF). On October 17, Best Friends defeated another Ice Ribbon/JWP team of Aoi Kizuki and Kayoko Haruyama to win the International Ribbon Tag Team Championship.

Between October 26 and November 3, Fujimoto took part in a tournament to crown the new Reina World Women's Champion. After defeating Rina Yamashita in the quarterfinals and Yako Fujigasaki in the semifinals, Fujimoto defeated Syuri in the finals to win the tournament and become the new Reina World Women's Champion. She made her first successful defense of the title at an Ice Ribbon show on November 23 against Yuka. She made her second successful defense back in Reina on December 26 against Maki Narumiya. The following day, Best Friends won two more titles, when they defeated the Jumonji Sisters (Dash Chisako and Sendai Sachiko) for the Daily Sports Women's Tag Team and JWP Tag Team Championships. On March 25, 2016, Fujimoto lost the Reina World Women's Championship to Makoto in her second defense. On May 4 at Ice Ribbon's 10th anniversary event, Fujimoto wrestled in a special non-title tag team match, which featured the promotion's founder Emi Sakura wrestling her first Ice Ribbon match in over four years. In the match, Fujimoto and Arisa Nakajima defeated Sakura and Nanae Takahashi with Fujimoto pinning Sakura for the win. In June, Fujimoto made it to the finals of the 32-wrestler 2016 Catch the Wave tournament, but was defeated there by Ryo Mizunami. On July 3, Fujimoto defeated Risa Sera to win the ICE×∞ Championship for the fifth time. On August 14, Fujimoto and Nakajima lost the Daily Sports Women's Tag Team and JWP Tag Team Championships to Hanako Nakamori and Kyoko Kimura in their fourth title defense. After four successful title defenses, Best Friends lost the International Ribbon Tag Team Championship to Hiragi Kurumi and Tsukushi on September 19. After nine successful defenses, Fujimoto was stripped of the ICE×∞ Championship on November 3, after her defense against Tsukushi ended in a 30-minute time limit draw. Fujimoto eventually made it to the finals of a tournament to crown the new champion, before losing to Risa Sera on December 31. On June 25, 2017, Fujimoto defeated Manami Toyota and Tsukushi to win the Triangle Ribbon Championship for the third time. Following the match, Toyota challenged both Fujimoto and Tsukushi to try to defeat her before her retirement from professional wrestling four months later. On November 3, Fujimoto defeated Toyota in her retirement match, scoring the pin with Toyota's own Japanese Ocean Cyclone Suplex.

== Acting career ==
=== Filmography ===
- 2007: Moe Spirit (魂萌え, Tama Moe)
- 2008: Eko Eko Azarak (エコエコアザラク, Eko Eko Azaraku)
- 2009: Harui no Soup (春色のスープ)
- 2009: Three Count (スリーカウント, Surī Kaunto)
- 2009: A Story (フィッシュストーリー, Fisshu Sutōrī)
- 2009: Heisei Tonpachi Yarō: Otoko wa Tsurada Yo (平成トンパチ野郎～男はツラだよ～)
- 2010: Kenka Banchō (喧嘩番長)
- 2011: Crazy-Ism (クレイジズム, Kureijizumu)
- 2014: Taiyo Kara Plancha (太陽からプランチャ, Taiyo Kara Purancha)
- 2014: Den Ace Taro (電エースタロウ, Den Ēsu Tarō)

=== Television ===
- 2007: 6 Banme no Profile (6番目のプロフィール, Roku Banme no Purofīru)
- 2008: Medical Horror Check Show (たけしの本当は怖い家庭の医学, Takeshi no Hontō wa Kowai Katei no Igaku)
- 2008: Zenryoku Saka (全力坂)
- 2008: Koisuru Futsal (恋するフットサル, Koisuru Futtosaru)
- 2008–2009: Muscle Venus (マッスルビーナス, Massuru Bīnasu)
- 2008: L-Boy
- 2008: Yakusoku no Cafe (約束のカフェ)
- 2009: SMAP×SMAP
- 2009: QVC
- 2009: Shiawase Kekkon Sōdansho (シアワセ結婚相談所)
- 2009: Wrestle Arena (レッスルアリーナ, Ressuru Arīna)
- 2009: Bankisha (バンキシャ)
- 2009: Mercy 2 Festa Futsal Entertainers (メルシートゥーフェスタ芸能人フットサル, Merushī Too Fesuta Geinōjin Futtosaru)
- 2009–2010: Angel League (エンジェルリーグ, Enjeru Rīgu)
- 2010: Futsal Girls (フットサルガールズ, Futtosaru Gāruzu)
- 2010: Sports Paradise (スポーツパラダイス, Supōtsu Paradaisu)
- 2010: Hanamaru Market (はなまるマーケット, Hanamaru Māketto)
- 2011: Shiawase! Bonbi Girl (幸せ！ボンビーガール, Shiawase! Bonbī Gāru)
- 2011: Tensai TV-kun (天才てれびくん, Tensai Terebikun)
- 2013: Happy Happy Morning: Hapimo (はぴハピモーニング～ハピモ～, Hapihapimōningu～Hapimo～)

== Personal life ==
Fujimoto married her husband on March 15, 2022, and she announced that she would take an indefinite hiatus from professional wrestling after May 4.

== Other media ==
In 2008, the cast of Muscle Venus recorded a song titled Itsuka Kitto (いつかきっと; "Someday"), which was released as a single on November 5, 2008, and later used as the theme song for the Three Count film. In July 2009, Fujimoto released a gravure DVD, titled Venus Shoot (ビーナスシュート, Bīnasu Shūto). This was followed by her second DVD, titled infinity, released in July 2014, a third, titled The Torishimariyaku (The取締役), released in August 2015, and a fourth, titled Red Corner, released in January 2017. Fujimoto, along with Hikaru Shida and Miyako Matsumoto, was featured in Japanese pop group angela's 2012 music video for their song "The Lights of Heroes". In November 2015, Fujimoto announced that she and Arisa Nakajima were releasing a cover version of their entrance song, "Friends" by Rebecca.

== Championships and accomplishments ==
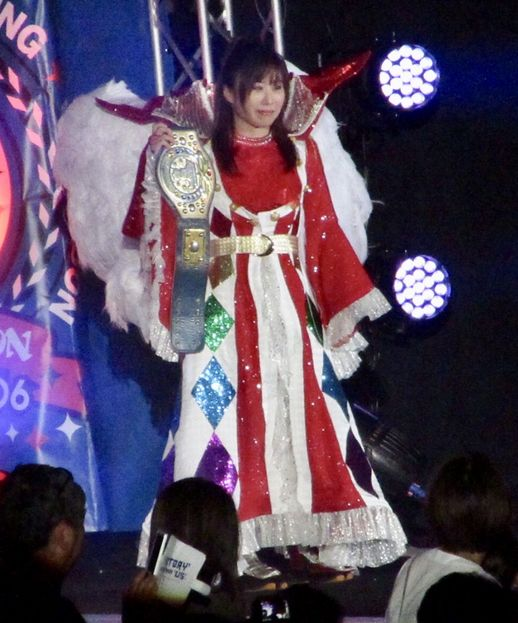
In Ice Ribbon, Fujimoto is a former seven-time ICE×60/ICE×∞ Champion.

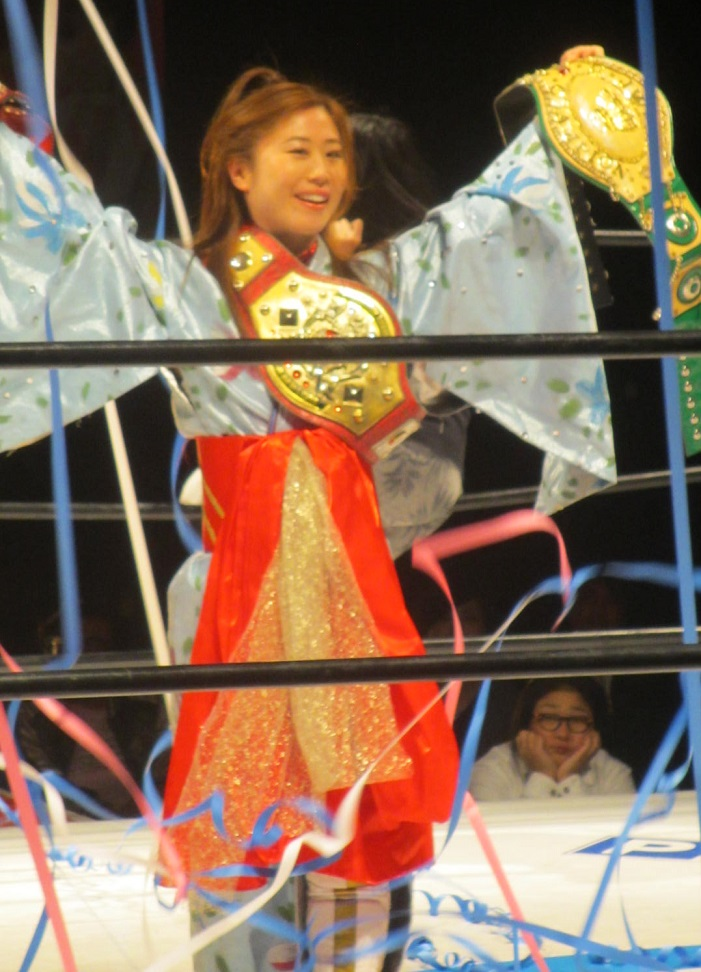
In JWP Joshi Puroresu, Fujimoto is a former Daily Sports Women's Tag Team Champion.

- DDT Pro-Wrestling
  - Ironman Heavymetalweight Championship (3 times)
- Ice Ribbon
  - ICE×60/ICE×∞ Championship (7 times)
  - International Ribbon Tag Team Championship (8 times) – with Arisa Nakajima (1), Hikaru Shida (3), Hiroyo Matsumoto (1) and Tsukushi (3),
  - IW19 Championship (2 times)
  - Triangle Ribbon Championship (3 times)
  - 2nd 19 O'Clock Girls ProWrestling Tournament (2012)
  - Captain's Fall Six Woman Tag Tournament (2010) – with Miyako Matsumoto and Sayaka Obihiro
  - Double Crown Tag Championship Tournament (2012) – with Hikaru Shida
  - Ike! Ike! Ima, Ike! Ribbon Tag Tournament (2011) – with Hikaru Shida
  - Super Ice-Cup (2010)
  - First Grand Slam Champion
  - Third Triple Crown Champion
  - Ice Ribbon Year-End Award (5 times)
    - Best Bout Award (2016) vs. Tsukushi on November 3
    - Best Bout Award (2018) vs. Maya Yukihi on August 26
    - Best Tag Team Award (2019) with Tsukushi
    - MVP Award (2016, 2018)
- JWP Joshi Puroresu
  - Daily Sports Women's Tag Team Championship (1 time) – with Arisa Nakajima
  - JWP Tag Team Championship (1 time) – with Arisa Nakajima
- Nikkan Sports
  - Joshi Puroresu Best Technique Award (2009)
- Pro Wrestling Illustrated
  - Ranked No. 20 of the top 150 female wrestlers in the PWI Women's 150 in 2021
- Pro Wrestling Wave
  - Wave Tag Team Championship (1 time) – with Misaki Ohata
  - Dual Shock Wave (2012) – with Misaki Ohata
  - One Day 6-Person Tag Tournament (2014) – with Mio Shirai and Misaki Ohata
  - Catch the Wave Award (3 times)
    - Best Performance Award (2014, 2015) (Note: In 2015, Fujimoto won the Best Performance award as part of the Wonderful World Fairy Family.)
    - Technique Award (2012)
- Reina X World / Reina Joshi Puroresu
  - Reina World Tag Team Championship (2 times) – with Hikaru Shida
  - Reina World Women's Championship (1 time)
  - Reina World Tag Team Championship 1Day Tournament (2012) – with Hikaru Shida
  - Reina World Women's Championship Tournament (2015)
- Seadlinnng
  - Beyond the Sea Tag Team Championship (1 time) – with Arisa Nakajima
- Tokyo Sports
  - Joshi MVP (2018)
