= Sophia Junior College =

Coordinates: 35°21′50.3″N 139°14′13.8″E

Sophia University Junior College Division
- 上智大学短期大学部
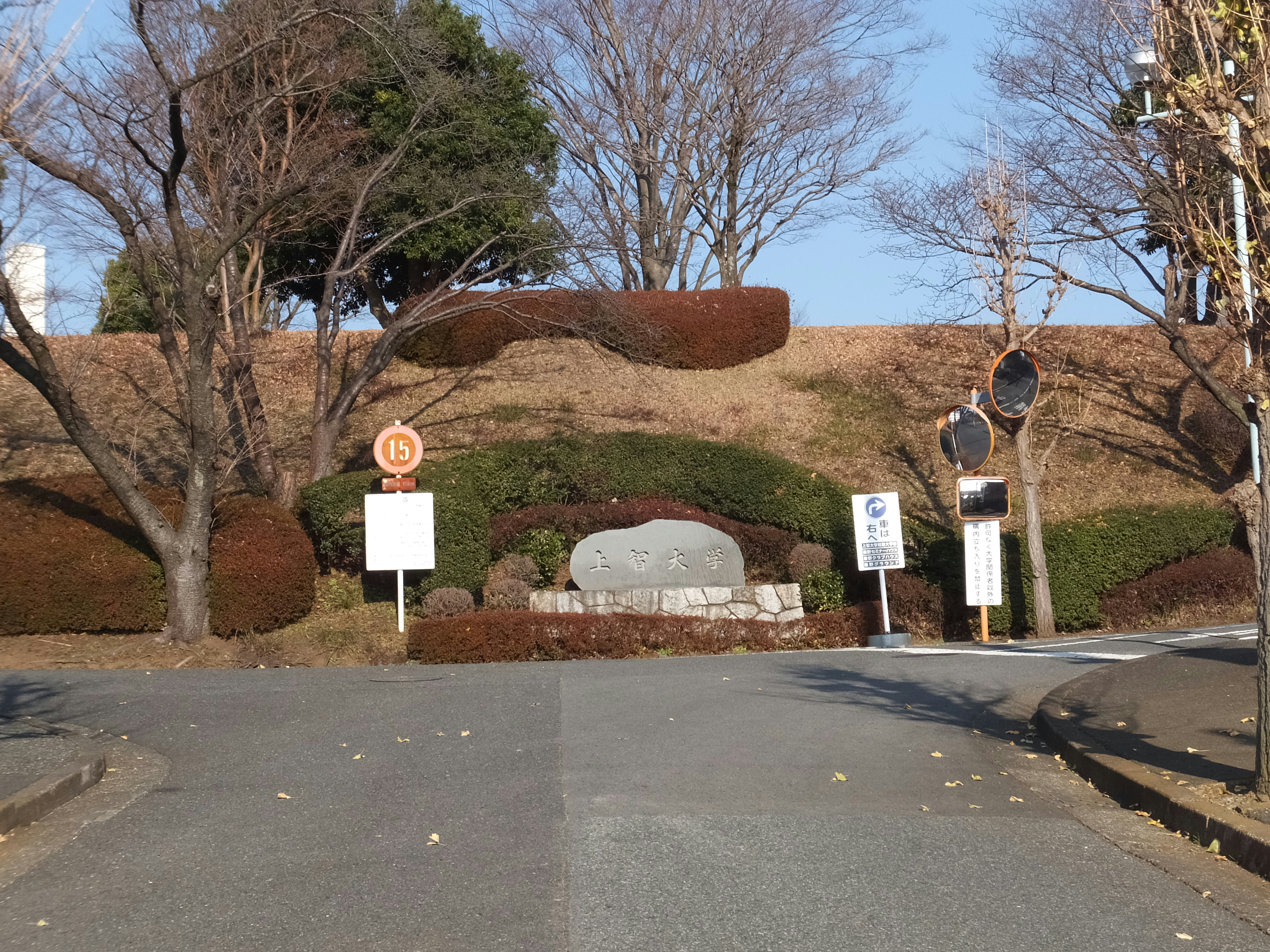
- Type: private
- Established: 1973
- Location: Hadano, Kanagawa, Japan
- Website: www.jrc.sophia.ac.jp

Sophia University Junior College Division (上智大学短期大学部, Jōchi Daigaku Tanki Daigakubu) is a private junior college in Hadano, Kanagawa, Japan. It was founded in 1973 and since then it has admitted only females.

Due to population decline and the increasing popularity of four-year co-educational universities and colleges among female applicants, the college will suspend admissions after 2025, with the class admitted in 2024 being the last.

== Departments ==
=== Departments ===
- Department of English Language is the only department in the college.

== See also ==
- List of junior colleges in Japan
- Sophia University
