= Kiyoko Ichiki =

Japanese professional wrestler

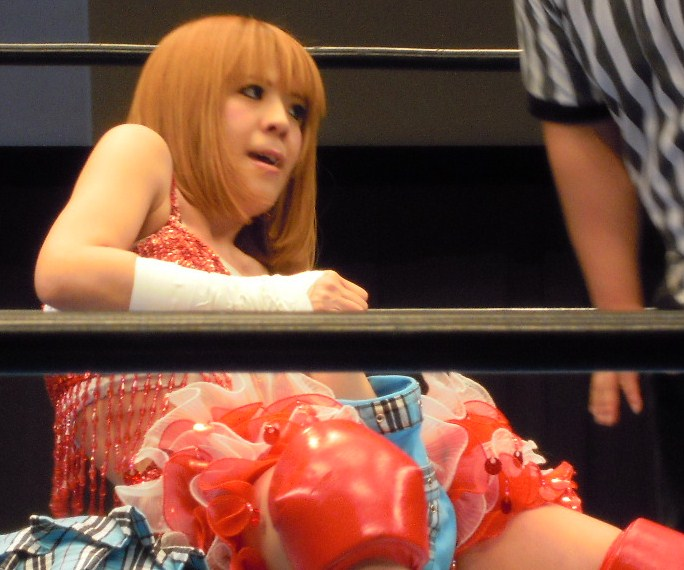
- Ichiki in May 2010

Personal information
- Born: February 21, 1973 (age 53) Kobe, Japan

Professional wrestling career
- Ring name: Kiyoko Ichiki
- Billed height: 153 cm (5 ft 0 in)
- Billed weight: 53 kg (117 lb)
- Trained by: Kotetsu Yamamoto
- Debut: 1994

Kiyoko Ichiki (市来貴代子, Ichiki Kiyoko) is a Japanese professional wrestler currently working as a freelancer and is best known for her time in the Japanese promotions JWP Joshi Puroresu, NEO Japan Ladies Pro-Wrestling and Big Japan Pro Wrestling.

== Professional wrestling career ==
=== Independent circuit (1994–present) ===
Ichiki made her professional wrestling debut at IWA Japan Opening Year '94 Final Battle, an event promoted by the International Wrestling Association of Japan where she fell short to Cynthia Moreno.

During her freelancing work, Ichiki made appearances for various promotions from the Japanese independent scene. Ichiki wrestled for All Japan Women's Pro-Wrestling on August 13, 1996, at AJW Discover New Heroine, where she competed in a battle royal won by Chiquita Azteca and also involving notable opponents such as Command Bolshoi, Etsuko Mita, Jaguar Yokota, Kaoru Ito, Mariko Yoshida, Tomoko Miyaguchi, Takako Inoue, Yumi Fukawa and others. She has had a brief tenure with Gaea Japan and participated in a tournament for the WCW Women's Cruiserweight Championship placing herself in the block B where she unsuccessfully competed against Sonoko Kato. At JWP Beauty, an event promoted by JWP Joshi Puroresu on August 26, 2001, Ichiki wrestled two times. First in a battle royal won by Kayoko Haruyama and also involving Azumi Hyuga, Kaori Yoneyama, Tsubasa Kuragaki and others, and secondly in a tag team match in which she teamed up with Ran YuYu to defeat Azumi Hyuga and Tsubasa Kuragaki. Between 2001 and 2004, Ichiki has a brief tenure with NEO Japan Ladies Pro-Wrestling. Her most notable work was recorded during the 2002 Neo Japan Cup, where on the third night of the show from May 6, she participated in a 300.000 Yen battle royal won by Ran Yu-Yu and also involving Carlos Amano, Mima Shimoda, Kyoko Inoue, Yoshiko Tamura, Yuki Miyazaki and others. At Gatoh Move Japan Tour #50 ~ Summer Vacation Approaching!, an event promoted by Gatoh Move Pro Wrestling on July 15, 2013, Ichiki unsuccessfully faced Emi Sakura for the AWF World Women's Championship. Ichiki has been inactive in professional wrestling since 2014.

=== Big Japan Pro Wrestling (1998–2000) ===
A promotion with which she spent significant time with was Big Japan Pro Wrestling. As a promotion rookie, she began competing in a "trial series" of three initiation matches. The first one took place at BJW New Year Great Series 2000 on January 2, where she fell short to Tomoko Watanabe. The next two matches have been against Devil Masami and Dynamite Kansai which Ichiki both lost. At BJW World Extreme Cup 2000 on May 14, Ichiki won the short-lived BJW International Eight Man Scramble Championship by defeating the reigning champion Great Kojika and Masayoshi Motegi, Chihiro Nakano, Harley Lewis, Kamikaze, Misae Genki and Terry Bull in a scramble match. On the fifth night of the 2000 edition of the Maximum Tag League II from July 2, Ichiki defeated Misae Genki to win the BJW Women's Championship.

=== Ice Ribbon (2008–2010) ===
Ichiki made her debut in Ice Ribbon at Ice Ribbon Future Star Vol. 8 on June 1, 2008, where she defeated Makoto. Her most notable work in the promotion was winning the ICE Cross Infinity Championship from Seina at Ice Ribbon New Ice Ribbon #32 on January 18, 2009. She wrestled her last match at Ice Ribbon New Ice Ribbon #180 on May 3, 2010, where she teamed up with Hamuko Hoshi to defeat Chii Tomiya and Masahiro Takanashi.

== Championships and accomplishments ==
- Big Japan Pro Wrestling
  - BJW Women's Championship (1 time)
  - BJW International Eight Man Scramble Championship (1 time)
- Ice Ribbon
  - ICE Cross Infinity Championship (1 time)
