= Mio Shirai =

Japanese professional wrestling referee and retired wrestler

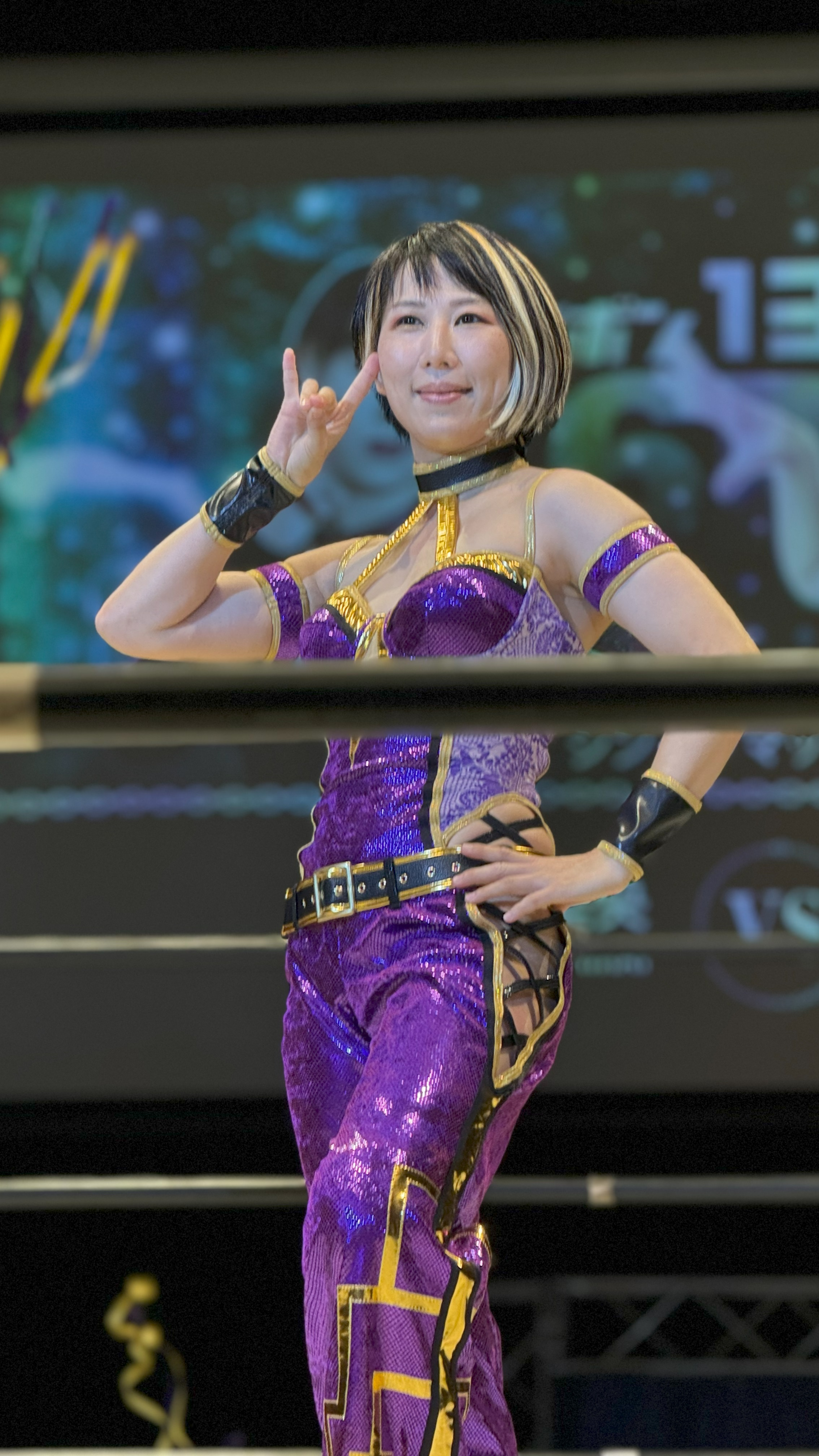
- Shirai in September 2024

Personal information
- Born: February 14, 1988 (age 38) Kamakura, Kanagawa, Japan
- Spouse: Tank Nagai (m. 2015)
- Children: 1
- Family: Io Shirai (sister)

Professional wrestling career
- Ring name(s): Binan Shirai; Kaguya; Kitzune Nanoko; Mio; Mio Shirai; Mochizuki Chiyome; Nazo Fukumen B Neko-fu Mio
- Billed height: 1.64 m (5 ft 4 1/2 in)
- Billed weight: 54 kg (119 lb)
- Trained by: Takashi Sasaki; Tomohiko Hashimoto; Toshie Uematsu
- Debut: March 4, 2007

Mio Shirai (紫雷 美央, Shirai Mio; born February 14, 1988) is a Japanese professional wrestling referee and professional wrestler.

She started her career in March 2007, working alongside her sister Io Shirai on the Japanese independent circuit for promotions such as Ice Ribbon, JWP Joshi Puroresu and Pro Wrestling Wave. In June 2010, the Shirais came together with fellow freelancer Kana to form the Triple Tails stable as part of which they began working most notably for Smash. After Io left the stable the following year, Mio and Kana continued working together as the tag team Triple Tails.S. Shirai remained a freelancer until January 2014, when she signed a four-way contract with Ice Ribbon, Oz Academy, Pro Wrestling Wave and Union Pro Wrestling. She retired from professional wrestling due to neck injuries in September 2015 at the age of 27, after which she started working as a referee. She wrestled sporadically in the early 2020s, and in 2024, worked 15 matches in various promotions, while still signed as a referee to Ice Ribbon. In 2025, she became a freelancer, breaking from Ice Ribbon to concentrate more on wrestling.

== Professional wrestling career ==
=== Team Makehen (2007–2010) ===
Shirai made her professional wrestling debut on March 4, 2007, alongside her younger sister (born Masami Odate), with the two adopting the ring names Mio and Io Shirai, respectively ("Shirai" being Japanese for "Purple Thunder"). In their debut match, the Shirai sisters teamed with Toshie Uematsu to face the trio of Erika Ura, Nozomi Takesako and Yuri Urai. Starting their careers as freelancers, the Shirai sisters represented Team Makehen, a stable made up of wrestlers trained by Tomohiko Hashimoto, in several independent promotions during their first year in the business, including Ibuki, Pro Wrestling Wave, JWP Joshi Puroresu, and Sendai Girls' Pro Wrestling.

On October 19, 2008, Mio and Io made their debuts for one of Japan's largest professional wrestling promotions, All Japan Pro Wrestling (AJPW), wrestling in a match, where they defeated the team of Kyoko Kimura and Mikado. From January to March 2009, the Shirais also made several appearances for another large promotion not usually known for female wrestling, Pro Wrestling Zero1. On April 29, the Shirai sisters won their first championship by defeating Moeka Haruhi and Tomoka Nakagawa in a tournament final to become the first TLW (Totally Lethal Wrestling) World Young Women's Tag Team Champions. Despite its name, the championship was owned and promoted by Pro Wrestling Wave. From July to November, the Shirais spent four months working for the Ice Ribbon promotion.

On November 12, 2009, the Shirais entered Pro Wrestling Wave's Captain's Fall Six Person Tag Team Tournament, teaming with Gami, but the trio was defeated in their first round match by Ran Yu-Yu, Ryo Mizunami and Toshie Uematsu. However, the trio earned their way back into the tournament by defeating Misaki Ohata, Moeka Haruhi and Yumi Ohka in a consolation match later that same day. On November 25, the Shirais and Gami first defeated Bullfight Sora, Cherry and Kaoru in the semifinals and then Ayumi Kurihara, Kana and Shuu Shibutani in the finals to win the tournament. On December 23, the Shirais lost the TLW World Young Women's Tag Team Championship to Misaki Ohata and Moeka Haruhi. On June 9, 2010, Mio entered the 2010 Catch the Wave tournament. After two draws and two losses, Shirai finished last in her block and did not advance in the tournament.

=== Triple Tails (2010–2011) ===
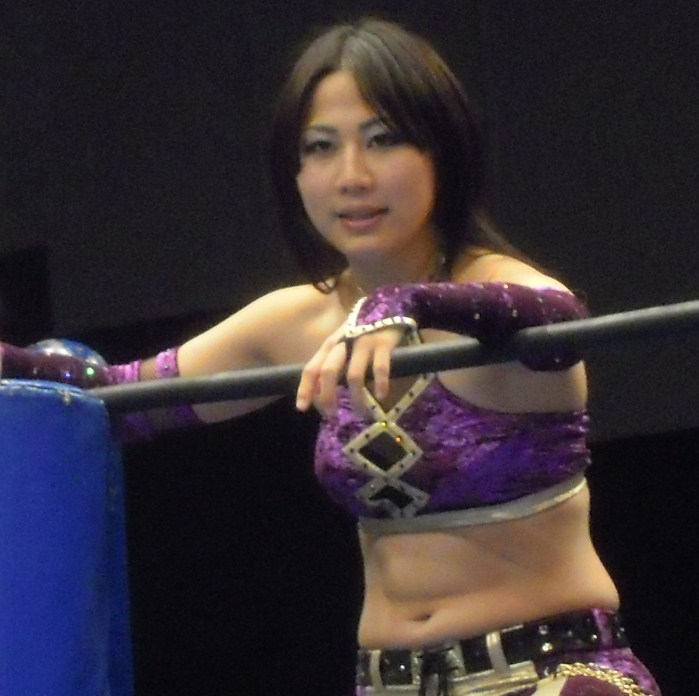
Shirai in December 2010

On June 19, 2010, the Shirai sisters formed the Triple Tails stable with fellow freelancer Kana, defeating Ayumi Kurihara, Hikaru Shida and Yoshiko Tamura in their first match together at a NEO Japan Ladies Pro Wrestling event. As a result, the Shirais received a shot Kurihara's and Tamura's NEO Tag Team Championship on July 4, but were defeated by the defending champions. Triple Tails returned to its winning ways on August 29, by defeating Asami Kawasaki, Hikaru Shida and Nagisa Nozaki in a six-woman tag team match. On October 18, 2010, Shirai, working under the ring name Kitzune Nanoko, made her debut for AAA in Puebla, Mexico, where she teamed with Alissa Flash to defeat Cynthia and Esther Moreno in a tag team match. In Mexico, both Shirais worked under cat-like masks they would only wear for their entrances in Japan. On October 31, Shirai was renamed Kaguya, while her debuting little sister was given the ring name Oyuki. In their first match under the new names, Kaguya and Oyuki teamed with Yuriko in a six-person tag team match, where they were defeated by Cynthia Moreno, Gato Eveready and Mari Apache. During their stay in AAA, Kaguya and Oyuki became associates of the La Legión Extranjera (Foreign Legion) stable. On November 7, Kaguya and Oyuki defeated Faby and Mari Apache in a tag team match and afterwards stole Faby's AAA World Mixed Tag Team Championship and Mari's AAA Reina de Reinas Championship belts. On November 15, the Apaches and Cynthia Moreno defeated Kaguya, Oyuki and Sexy Star in a six-woman tag team match. A week later, Kaguya, Oyuki and Jennifer Blake defeated Moreno and the Apaches in another six-woman tag team match. This would turn out to be Kaguya's and Oyuki's final AAA appearance, which resulted in the storyline with the Apaches being dropped without a conclusion. Upon the Shirais' return to Japan, Triple Tails made its debut as a unit for Pro Wrestling Wave on December 19, defeating Cherry, Gami and Tomoka Nakagawa in the six-woman tag team main event.

On January 29, 2011, the Shirais made their debuts for Smash, when the Triple Tails stable attacked Yusuke Kodama and Makoto after their matches, with the trio being both times chased out of the ring by Tajiri. On February 13, Triple Tails produced its first own event, where the Shirai sisters wrestled male tag team Momo no Seishun Tag (Atsushi Kotoge and Daisuke Harada) in a losing effort. On February 25, the Shirais made their Smash in-ring debuts at Smash.14, where they teamed with Kana to defeat Ken Ohka, Tajiri and Yoshiaki Yago in an intergender six-person tag team match. In March, Triple Tails took part in Osaka Pro Wrestling's Spring Samba Series, going undefeated in six-person tag team matches for the duration of the tour. On April 30 at Smash.16, Triple Tails was defeated in a six-woman tag team match by Makoto, Serena and Syuri. On May 3 at Smash.17, the Shirai sisters were defeated in a tag team match by Hikaru Shida and Syuri. Triple Tails' second event took place on May 8 and saw Mio, Io and Kana defeat Akino, Kagetsu and Syuri in a main event six-woman tag team match. In June, Mio began wrestling regularly for Union Pro Wrestling, starting a feud with male wrestler Ken Ohka. On July 10, Shirai defeated Ohka to win the SGP Global Junior Heavyweight Championship, afterwards declaring herself Ohka's master.

On July 23, Triple Tails held a press conference to announce that, following the group's third self-produced event on September 18, Io was leaving the stable in order to pursue a singles career. On August 21, Triple Tails made its debut for Oz Academy, defeating the trio of Ayumi Kurihara, Hiren and Yumi Ohka. On September 14, Triple Tails defeated Cherry, Moeka Haruhi and Shuu Shibutani in the group's final Pro Wrestling Wave appearance. Four days later, Triple Tails defeated Dash Chisako, Ryo Mizunami and Sendai Sachiko at their third self-produced event in the group's final appearance together.

=== Triple Tails.S (2011–2013) ===
After Io's departure from Triple Tails, Mio and Kana renamed the group Triple Tails.S and continued wrestling together as a tag team. However, in Smash, Mio and Kana were broken apart following Io's departure, with Kana being preoccupied with the Smash Diva Championship and Mio entering a storyline with Takuya Kito. The storyline involved Kito repeatedly professing his love for Mio, who refused to return the affection. On September 8 at Smash.21, Shirai defeated Kito in a hardcore match. After the match, when Kito continued to profess his love for Shirai, he was attacked by IWA Japan wrestler Keizo Matsuda. During the following months, Shirai repeatedly cost Kito matches against Matsuda and his colleagues, but still could not get him to leave her alone. After the break up of Triple Tails, Shirai continued making semi-regular appearances for Osaka Pro Wrestling, forming a partnership with male wrestler Hayata, whom she would refer to as her "big brother". The two also went on to team together in Pro Wrestling Wave. On October 19, Shirai lost the SGP Global Junior Heavyweight Championship to Cherry. Initially, Shirai announced that she was leaving Union Pro following her loss, but eventually came back to form a partnership with Ken Ohka, who had now accepted his role as her inferior. Meanwhile, Shirai and Kana also continued to produce their own events; Triple Tails.S' first show took place on November 2 and saw Shirai wrestle Toshie Uematsu to a 30-minute time limit draw in the main event. On November 23, Shirai and Kana defeated Ayako Hamada and Shuu Shibutani in the finals to win the Osaka Joshi Pro Wrestling Tag Team Tournament.

In December 2011, Shirai made her American debut, when she took part in Chikara's JoshiMania weekend. On December 2 in Philadelphia, Pennsylvania, Shirai teamed with Mayumi Ozaki in a losing effort against the team of Ayako Hamada and Cherry. The following day in Everett, Massachusetts, Shirai was defeated by Ozaki in a singles match. On the third and final night of the tour in Manhattan, New York, Shirai, Aja Kong and Tsubasa Kuragaki defeated Hanako Nakamori, Manami Toyota and Sawako Shimono in a six-woman tag team match. On January 3, 2012, Shirai returned to the ring with her sister, when she teamed with Ken Ohka at a Union Pro event to unsuccessfully challenge Io and Nosawa Rongai for the Americas World Mixed Tag Team Championship. At a Pro Wrestling Wave event on February 1, Ayumi Kurihara, Mika Iida and Shuu Shibutani joined forces with Shirai and Kana, turning Triple Tails.S from a tag team once again into a stable. The following month, the stable was renamed White Tails, in reference to Wave's top villainous alliance, Black Dahlia. On February 11, Shirai began working regularly for Oz Academy, defeating Hiroyo Matsumoto, a member of the villainous Seikigun, in her return match to the promotion. On February 26, Shirai was defeated by Seikigun leader Mayumi Ozaki in a tryout match and afterwards agreed to join her stable, noting that they "had a lot of things in common". Back in Smash, the hostilities between Shirai and Takuya Kito ended after Kito led a four-man team to a final victory over a team of IWA Japan wrestlers, which led to Shirai and Kito teaming together and defeating Aki Shizuku and Koji Doi on March 14 at Smash.Final, the promotion's final event before ceasing its operations. Afterwards, Shirai continued working for Smash's follow-up promotion, Wrestling New Classic, teaming with Kana to defeat Makoto and Syuri at the promotion's first event, Before the Dawn, on April 26. After the match, Shirai sided with Makoto and against Kana, when she was verbally assaulting her defeated opponent. Taking Makoto under her wing, Shirai began referring to her as her sister. In early 2012, Shirai started a rivalry in Union Pro with Cherry, attempting to reveal her true age, a secret Cherry had managed to keep for her whole career. On March 18, Cherry defeated Shirai in a match, where she would have had to reveal her age, had she been defeated. A rematch, with an added stipulation that Shirai would have to remove all of her makeup if she lost, was scheduled for May 4, however, Shirai was forced to pull out of the match, after suffering a nasal fracture at an Oz Academy event five days earlier. Shirai ended up managing her replacement, Emi Sakura, to a win, after interfering in the match; as a result, Cherry was forced to reveal that she was born May 14, 1974.

Shirai, working with a nose protector, returned to the ring on May 29 at a Pro Wrestling Wave event, losing to Syuri in her first round-robin match in the 2012 Catch the Wave tournament. On June 8, in her second match in the tournament, Shirai defeated Ayumi Kurihara, and in doing so also won DDT Pro-Wrestling's Ironman Heavymetalweight Championship. Two days later, Shirai lost the title to Hiroyo Matsumoto in the first round of a tournament to determine the number one contender to the Oz Academy Openweight Championship. On June 22, Shirai returned to WNC, when she teamed with Makoto in a tag team match, where they defeated Kana and Syuri. In early July, Shirai and Kana took part in the 2012 Japan Expo in Paris, France. On July 30, Shirai regained the Ironman Heavymetalweight Championship by pinning Gorgeous Matsuno in a four-way tag team match. However, immediately afterwards Shirai was pinned for the title by the special guest referee of the match, Gentaro. On July 27 at a Pro Wrestling Wave event, White Tails and Black Dahlia wrestled to a draw in a five-on-five gauntlet match, from which Shirai was eliminated after wrestling Black Dahlia leader Misaki Ohata to a ten-minute time limit draw. Afterwards, Shirai agreed to join Black Dahlia at the request of Ohata, who was trying to bring down the average age of her group, but also wanted to remain a member of White Tails. The two groups then agreed that the stable which would manage to draw fewer people to their self-produced Wave event, which would take place August 7 and 8, would disband. Shirai performed on both the Black Dahlia and the White Tails event and afterwards remained with White Tails, which won the battle for attendance 201-191, forcing Black Dahlia to disband. Also in August, Shirai returned to Ice Ribbon. After remaining undefeated for the entire month, scoring singles victories over Riho and Hamuko Hoshi and a tag team victory over Hikaru Shida, Shirai was named the number one contender to Shida's ICE×60 Championship, Ice Ribbon's top title. On September 23 at Ribbon no Kishitachi 2012, Shirai defeated Shida to win the ICE×60 Championship, her first major joshi title. Following her win, Shirai turned down Miyako Matsumoto's challenge for the title and stated that she instead wanted to defend it against Tsukasa Fujimoto, whom she dubbed "the face of Ice Ribbon". On October 28 at 2012 Yokohama Ribbon III, Shirai defeated Fujimoto for her first successful defense of the ICE×60 Championship. On November 27, Shirai once again worked under her masked Kaguya persona, when she took part in the 2012 Reina de Reinas tournament, co-produced by Pro Wrestling Wave and AAA in Tokyo's Korakuen Hall. After defeating Faby Apache in her opening match, Kaguya was defeated in the finals of the tournament by the reigning AAA Reina de Reinas Champion, Sexy Star. The following day, Shirai made her second successful defense of the ICE×60 Championship against Neko Nitta. After several months of inactivity, Shirai and Kana announced on December 5, a week following Kana's departure from WNC, that they were restarting Triple Tails.S. The team's return match took place on December 16 at a Pro Wrestling Wave event, where they were defeated by Hikaru Shida and Yumi Ohka. Also in December, Shirai was in the running for Tokyo Sports' Joshi Puroresu Grand Prize, awarded to the joshi wrestler of the year, but was ultimately defeated in the voting process by Yuzuki Aikawa. On December 31 at RibbonMania 2012, Shirai lost the ICE×60 Championship to Maki Narumiya in her third defense, ending her reign at 99 days.

On January 13, 2013, Shirai received her first shot at the Oz Academy Openweight Championship in a match, where she was defeated by the defending champion, fellow Seikigun member Chikayo Nagashima. On January 30, Shirai entered a tournament contested for the vacant Triangle Ribbon Championship, defeating Aoi Kizuki and Hikaru Shida in her first round three-way match. On February 11, Shirai was defeated in the finals of the tournament by Miyako Matsumoto in a three-way match, which also included Tsukasa Fujimoto. On February 13, Shirai and Ken Ohka entered a storyline in Union Pro, where the two were forced out of the promotion, after Ohka was defeated by Keisuke Ishii in a "Loser Leaves Union match". However, the two reappeared at the end of event, now working under balaclavas and the ring names "Nazo Fukumen A" and "Nazo Fukumen B" in order to be able to continue working for the promotion. Shirai and Ohka were later joined by several other Union Pro wrestlers under Nazo Fukumen masks, including Shota as Nazo Fukumen C, Gabai-Ji-chan as Nazo Fukumen G, Kengo Mashimo as Nazo Fukumen K, Seiya Morohashi as Nazo Fukumen M, and Hiroshi Fukuda as Nazo Fukumen P. On February 17, Shirai entered the Wave Single Championship tournament as a late replacement for an injured Ayumi Kurihara, but was eliminated in her semifinal match by Kana. On February 24, Triple Tails.S held its first self-produced event in nine months, which saw Shirai and Kana wrestle Arisa Nakajima and Ayako Hamada in a main event tag team match. On March 29, Shirai, along with Hiroshi Fukuda, was named the official commentator for Union Pro's internet broadcasts. On April 5, Shirai made her in-ring debut as Nazo Fukumen B, unsuccessfully challenging Kaori Yoneyama for the Union Fly to Everywhere (FTE) World Championship, despite outside interference from Nazo Fukumen A and Nazo Fukumen P. On April 21, Shirai and Kana defeated Misaki Ohata and Tsukasa Fujimoto to win the Wave Tag Team Championship, bringing Triple Tails.S its first title. On June 9, Shirai picked up a major win by pinning the reigning JWP Openweight Champion Arisa Nakajima during the 2013 Catch the Wave tournament. Despite the win, Shirai failed to advance from her round-robin block, finishing with a record of three wins and three losses. On July 7, Shirai and Kana made their first successful defense of the Wave Tag Team Championship against Kyusei Sakura Hirota and Tsukasa Fujimoto. On July 12, the White Tails stable produced their final event before the group's dissolution, during which Shirai defeated the soon-to-retire Ayumi Kurihara in a singles match. Three days later, Shirai and Kana lost the Wave Tag Team Championship to Shidarezakura (Hikaru Shida and Yumi Ohka) in their second defense.

On July 27, Shirai made another appearance as Kaguya for Pro Wrestling Wave, when she took part in a match, where Ayumi Kurihara retired her masked A☆YU☆MI persona. Replacing an injured Ray, she teamed with Leon to defeat A☆YU☆MI and noki-A, the masked Akino, in a tag team main event. Back in Ice Ribbon, Shirai formed a new partnership with rookie Rutsuko Yamaguchi. On August 25, Shirai and Yamaguchi defeated BBA38 (Cherry and Meari Naito) to become the number one contenders to the International Ribbon Tag Team Championship. They received their title shot on September 22, but were defeated by the defending champions, Muscle Venus (Hikaru Shida and Tsukasa Fujimoto). The following day in Union Pro, the Nazo Fukumen storyline was concluded, when first Kaori Yoneyama unmasked Nazo Fukumen B as Shirai during a mixed tag team match and later in the main event, Nazo Fukumen K, KJ and P lost to Union Seikigun (Isami Kodaka, Madoka and Seiya Morohashi) in a three-on-three hardcore elimination match. Post-match, the now unmasked Hiroshi Fukuda apologized for the stable's past actions and both he and Shirai were welcomed back to Union Pro by the promotion's official representative Naomi Susan. Shirai then entered a storyline built on the relationship between Union Pro and AV company IdeaPocket. Picking up wins over the likes of Hiroshi Fukuda, Masayuki Mitomi and Menso～re Oyaji, Shirai earned the right to collaborate with AV actresses such as Rika Seibi, Ryu Mizusaki and Tsubasa Amami. On October 20, Shirai returned to AJPW, when the promotion held its first women's match in years, where she was defeated by Akino. Six days later, Shirai made her debut for the AJPW splinter promotion Wrestle-1, defeating Bambi in a singles match. In late 2013, Shirai formed a new cross-promotional three-woman stable named Kuros with Misaki Ohata and Tsukasa Fujimoto. After not appearing for the promotion for thirteen months, it was announced on October 31 that Shirai would be returning to Wrestling New Classic as the newest member of Makoto's Shiritsu Puroresu Gakuen ("Private Wrestling School") stable. Shirai, however, quickly established that she was not on the same page as Makoto, announcing that she was bringing Misaki Ohata with her to confront the "wimps" in charge of the school. Shirai's WNC return match took place on November 29, when she and Ohata defeated Makoto and Miyako Matsumoto in a tag team match. On December 27, Shirai and Kana announced they were disbanding Triple Tails.S, with their final self-produced independent event taking place in early 2014.

=== Four-way affiliation (2014–2015) ===
On January 22, 2014, Shirai held a press conference with the heads of Ice Ribbon, Oz Academy, Pro Wrestling Wave and Union Pro to announce that she had signed an unprecedented four-way contract with the promotions and was now officially affiliated with all four of them. As a signing gift, Shirai was given the right to book Oz Academy's March 2 event. She punished Seikigun's rivals Chikayo Nagashima, Hikaru Shida, Kagetsu and Sonoko Kato by placing them in unfavorable matches, named stablemates Mayumi Ozaki and Yumi Ohka the number one contenders to the Oz Academy Tag Team Championship and gave herself a shot at the Oz Academy Openweight Championship. Meanwhile, Shirai also earned another shot at the Union FTE World Championship, challenging Cherry after her first match under a Union Pro contract on February 11, where the two defeated Kaori Yoneyama and Sareee. On March 2, Shirai failed in her attempt to capture the Oz Academy Openweight Championship from Akino. Shirai also failed to win gold on two occasions in another one of her new home promotions, Ice Ribbon, unsuccessfully challenging Cherry for the Triangle Ribbon Championship on March 1 and Muscle Venus for the International Ribbon Tag Team Championship alongside Miyako Matsumoto on March 9. On March 23, Shirai also failed to win the Union FTE World Championship from Cherry. On May 15, Shirai and Kana produced Triple Tails.S' final independent event before officially dissolving the partnership, which featured a main event tag team match, where Shirai and Kayoko Haruyama were defeated by Kana and Arisa Nakajima. From May 5 to July 4, Shirai took part in the round-robin portion of the 2014 Catch the Wave tournament, finishing with a record of two wins, one draw and three losses, failing to advance from her block after losing to Misaki Ohata in their final round-robin match.

On August 1, Shirai held a press conference to announce that on September 11 she would be producing her own event at Shinjuku Face under the banner of "M.I.O" (Mission in Odate), which would feature her wrestling her first deathmatch. On August 31, Shirai defeated Ladybeard to become the new Union FTE World Champion. On September 11, Shirai wrestled twice during her first M.I.O event; first she defeated Misaki Ohata and Tsukasa Fujimoto in a three-way match between the Kuros members and then, in the main event, teamed with Isami Kodaka and Maki Narumiya in a six-person "Barbed Wire Board Deathmatch", where they were defeated by Mayumi Ozaki, Shuu Shibutani and Yuko Miyamoto. On September 15, Shirai and Misaki Ohata unsuccessfully challenged Sakuragohan (Mika Iida and Kyusei Sakura Hirota) for the Wave Tag Team Championship, which also forced them to start the upcoming 2014 Dual Shock Wave from the first round. On September 23, Shirai and Ohata defeated Tsukasa Fujimoto and Yumi Ohka in the first round of the tournament. On October 1, Shirai and Ohata defeated Dynamite Kansai and Fairy Nipponbashi to advance to the semifinals of the tournament, where, later that same event, they wrestled Kyoko Kimura and Tomoka Nakagawa to a fifteen-minute time limit draw. Ohata was then defeated by Kimura in an overtime singles match and, as a result, both she and Shirai were eliminated from the tournament. On November 26, Kuros won Wave's second annual One Day 6-Person Tag Tournament, defeating Cherry, Meari Naito and Shuu Shibutani in the finals and, as a result, earned the right to produce the December 14 Wave event. On December 21, Shirai challenged Hikaru Shida for both the Wave Single Championship and the Revolution Championship Wrestling (RCW) Women's Championship, but the match ended in a thirty-minute time limit draw, resulting in Shida retaining her titles. Two days later, Shirai made a surprise appearance for World Wonder Ring Stardom, confronting her sister Io and challenging her to a match at the second M.I.O event on February 14, 2015. On December 28 at Ice Ribbon's biggest event of the year, Ribbon Mania 2014, Shirai made her first successful defense of the Union FTE World Championship against Tsukushi. Later that same day, Shirai won the fan vote portion in the third annual Zan1 tournament, securing her overall win in the multi-stage tournament involving the entire Pro Wrestling Wave roster and earning her a rematch with Shida for the Wave Single Championship. Kuros took the first three positions in the tournament with Ohata, the winner of the two previous Zan1s, coming in second and Fujimoto third. On January 24, 2015, Shirai made her second successful defense of the Union FTE World Championship against Aoi Ishibashi.

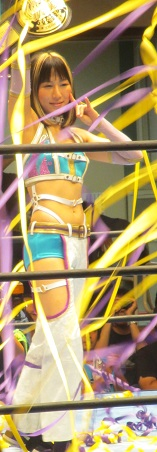
Shirai as one half of the Wave Tag Team Champions in August 2015

On February 14, her 27th birthday, Shirai presented the second M.I.O event in Shinjuku Face, which saw her lose to her sister Io in a main event singles match. This marked the first time in three years that the two sisters had wrestled in the same match. Two days later, Shirai held a press conference, where she announced that she would be retiring from professional wrestling due to issues with her neck, wrestling her final match at the fifth M.I.O event on September 20. On March 1, Shirai lost the Union FTE World Championship to Cherry in her third defense. In early 2015, Shirai and Misaki Ohata received two shots at the Wave Tag Team Championship, but were both times defeated by the defending champions, Las Aventureras (Ayako Hamada and Yuu Yamagata). A third title match between the two teams took place on March 15 and saw Shirai and Ohata become the new champions. Immediately afterwards, Shirai announced she was cashing in her Zan1 shot at the Wave Single Championship, held by Hamada, but was defeated in that title match. Six days later, Shirai won another tag team title, when she and Tsukushi defeated .STAP (Maki Narumiya and Risa Sera) to win the International Ribbon Tag Team Championship. Shirai and Ohata made their first successful title defense on April 19 against Kaho Kobayashi and Tsukasa Fujimoto. On May 9, the third M.I.O event featured Shirai retiring her Kaguya character, following a time-limit draw with Ayako Hamada. On June 7, Shirai defeated Akino with help from her Seikigun stablemates to win the Oz Academy Openweight Championship for the first time. After the match, Shirai confronted Akino's MK4 stable and proclaimed that she would relinquish the title if she ever lost to any member of the stable. Later that same day, Shirai faced Oz Academy Tag Team Champion and MK4 member Kaho Kobayashi in a non-title match at an event co-produced by Oz Academy and Pro Wrestling Wave. Following outside interference from Tomoka Nakagawa, Shirai was pinned by Kobayashi and, as a result, relinquished the Oz Academy Openweight Championship, ending her reign at only four hours and two minutes. On June 17, Shirai won yet another title, when she defeated Hibiscus Mii to regain the Union FTE World Championship. The fourth M.I.O event took place on June 19 and saw Shirai lose to Arisa Nakajima in the main event. On June 24, Shirai and Tsukushi made their first successful defense of the International Ribbon Tag Team Championship against the Lovely Butchers (Hamuko Hoshi and Mochi Miyagi) as part of Ice Ribbon's ninth anniversary week. On July 4, they made their second successful defense against Orange Happies (Aoi Kizuki and Kayoko Haruyama) with Shirai pinning ICE×∞ Champion Kizuki for the win, setting up a future double title match for both the ICE×∞ and Union FTE World Championship. On July 19, Shirai and Mayumi Ozaki defeated Kagetsu and Kaho Kobayashi to win the Oz Academy Tag Team Championship, meaning that Shirai now simultaneously held titles in all four promotions she was signed to. On July 26, Shirai returned to Stardom to wrestle what was billed as the Shirai sisters' final match together, where Mio and Io defeated Hiroyo Matsumoto and Mayu Iwatani.

On July 29, Shirai lost the Union FTE World Championship to Aoi Kizuki in her first defense in a match also contested for the ICE×∞ Championship. On August 9, as part of her road to retirement, Shirai was set to face male wrestler Minoru Suzuki at a Wave event. Before the start of the match, Suzuki announced he was putting his GHC Heavyweight Championship on the line in the match, before going on to defeat Shirai to retain the title. On August 17, Shirai and Tsukushi lost the International Ribbon Tag Team Championship to Nekoka Tag (Leon and Neko Nitta) in their third defense. Three days later, Kuros produced their final independent event, before the stable's dissolution, where Shirai, Fujimoto and Ohata defeated Chikayo Nagashima, Kayoko Haruyama and Meiko Satomura in a six-woman tag team main event. On August 23, Shirai lost another one of her tag team titles, when she and Mayumi Ozaki were defeated by Kagetsu and Kaho Kobayashi in a rematch for the Oz Academy Tag Team Championship. That same event, Shirai received a shot at the Oz Academy Openweight Championship, immediately after Sonoko Kato had won it, but was defeated by the new champion. On September 13, Shirai and Ohata made their second successful defense of the Wave Tag Team Championship against Hiroyo Matsumoto and Ryo Mizunami.

As her retirement drew closer, Shirai wrestled her final match for Union Pro on September 15, where she and Ladybeard were defeated by Gentaro and Kyoko Kimura. The following day, Shirai worked her final Pro Wrestling Wave event, during which she wrestled a series of five matches against Hikaru Shida, Ryo Mizunami, Yumi Ohka, Misaki Ohata and Asuka, drawing with Shida, defeating Asuka and losing the other three. On September 18, Shirai wrestled her final match for Oz Academy, where she was defeated by Mayumi Ozaki. Her final Ice Ribbon match took place the following day, when she wrestled a series of twelve one-minute matches against the entire roster. On September 20, Shirai produced her fifth M.I.O event in Korakuen Hall, which also served as her retirement event. During the event, Shirai wrestled three matches. First she teamed with Aoi Kizuki in a tag team match, where they defeated Mayumi Ozaki and Yumi Ohka with Shirai pinning Ozaki for the final win of her career. Then she wrestled the final singles match of her career, where she was defeated by Isami Kodaka. Finally, she wrestled in a six-woman tag team main event, where she, Misaki Ohata and Tsukasa Fujimoto were defeated by Hiroe Nagahama, Risa Sera and Tsukushi, who pinned her to end her career. Following the match, Shirai and Ohata relinquished their Wave Tag Team Championship.

=== Post-retirement ===
On October 4, 2015, Shirai returned to Union Pro to take part in the promotion's final event before folding, accompanying Ken Ohka and Shinichiro Tominaga to a three-way tag team match, where they were defeated by Men's Teioh and Sagat and which also included Kengo Ohka and Madoka.

On December 15, 2015, it was announced that Shirai would start working as a referee under the ring name Mio, written in Roman script and stylized in all capital letters. She made her debut in the role at Ice Ribbon's RibbonMania 2015 on December 31. In January 2016, Shirai began refereeing matches also for both Oz Academy and Pro Wrestling Wave. On August 16, it was announced that Shirai was officially joining Ice Ribbon's staff on September 1. In addition to continuing to work as a referee for the promotion, she would also take over the Puroresu Circle training duties.

In August 2020, Shirai wrestled a few matches for Ice Ribbon filling in for Nao Ishikawa who had to have ovarian surgery and could not compete.

Ayako Uriu and Selena Du defeated her in arm wrestling in 2023.

== Other media ==
In 2008, Shirai appeared with fellow wrestlers Kayo Noumi and Takako Inoue in The Brute Educational Institution (野獣学園, Yajū Gakuen), a video with lesbian discipline and catfight themes, released by Attack Zone, a label of Attackers. In September 2012, Shirai released a gravure DVD titled Iroha Kitsune / Murasaki Kaminari Mio (いろは狐／紫雷美央). On December 8, 2012, Shirai and Kana released another DVD with a similar theme, titled Sadistic Tails.

== Personal life ==
Mio Shirai has a younger sister, fellow professional wrestler Iyo Sky.

In September 2015, Shirai announced she was getting married the following month. Shirai later revealed her fiancé as professional wrestler Tank Nagai. The wedding ceremony took place on October 16, 2015. On December 31, 2016, Shirai announced she was pregnant with the couple's first child. She gave birth on June 18, 2017. She is a fan of musician Ryuichi Sakamoto.

== Championships and accomplishments ==
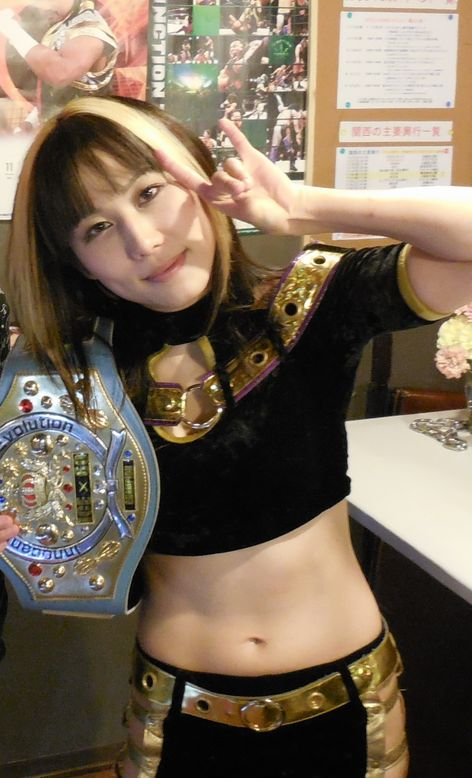
In Ice Ribbon, Shirai is a former ICE×60 Championship.

- DDT Pro-Wrestling
  - Ironman Heavymetalweight Championship (2 times)
- Ice Ribbon
  - ICE×60 Championship (1 time)
  - International Ribbon Tag Team Championship (1 time) – with Tsukushi
- Japan Indie Awards
  - Newcomer Award (2011)
- JWP Joshi Puroresu
  - 5th Junior All Star Photogenic Award (2007) – with Io Shirai
- Osaka Joshi Pro Wrestling
  - One Day Tag Tournament (2011) – with Kana
- Oz Academy
  - Oz Academy Openweight Championship (1 time)
  - Oz Academy Tag Team Championship (1 time) – with Mayumi Ozaki
  - Best Wizard Award (1 time)
    - Impact Award (2015) marriage and retirement announcement
- Pro Wrestling Wave
  - TLW World Young Women's Tag Team Championship (1 time) – with Io Shirai
  - Wave Tag Team Championship (2 times) – with Kana (1) and Misaki Ohata (1)
  - Captain's Fall Six Person Tag Team Tournament (2009) – with Mikiko Futagami and Io Shirai
  - One Day 6-Person Tag Tournament (2014) – with Misaki Ohata and Tsukasa Fujimoto
  - TLW World Young Women's Tag Team Tournament (2009) – with Io Shirai
  - Zan1 (2014)
  - Catch the Wave Award (4 times)
    - Best Bout Award (2025) vs. Risa Sera on May 14, shared with Haruka Umesaki vs. Kaho Kobayashi on July 5
    - Fighting Spirit Award (2025)
    - Outstanding Performance Award (2011, 2013)
- Seadlinnng
  - Beyond the Sea Tag Team Championship (1 time) – with Sumire Natsu
- Union Pro Wrestling
  - SGP Global Junior Heavyweight Championship (1 time)
  - Fly To Everywhere World Championship (2 times)
