= BJW Women's Championship =

Professional wrestling championship

Details
- Promotion: Big Japan Pro Wrestling
- Date established: 2000
- Date retired: November 9, 2011
Statistics
- First champion(s): Misae Genki
- Final champion(s): Kaori Yoneyama
- Longest reign: Kaori Yoneyama (3,233 days)
- Shortest reign: Kiyoko Ichiki (<1 day)
- Oldest champion: Kiyoko Ichiki (27 years, 252 days)
- Youngest champion: Kaori Yoneyama (21 years, 310 days)

The BJW Women's Championship (Japanese: BJW認定女子王座, Hepburn: BJW-nintei Joshi Ōza) was a title defended in the Japanese professional wrestling promotion Big Japan Pro Wrestling. It was created in 2000.

There were only three reigns and one vacancy shared between three wrestlers.

== History ==
Established in 2000 by Big Japan Pro Wrestling (BJW), the title was first won by Misae Genki when she defeated Kiyoko Ichiki during the Hardcore Series II tour, on July 2, 2000.

After the closure of the BJW women's division in 2003, the title was retained by Kaori Yoneyama until it was deactivated after her last successful defense over La☆Panda at the Yoshihito Sasaki, Jaki Numazawa and Nikkan Lee 11th Anniversary event on November 9, 2011.

== Reigns ==
Key
No.	Overall reign number
Reign	Reign number for the specific champion
Days	Number of days held

No.	Champion	Championship change			Reign statistics		Notes	Ref.
No.	Champion	Date	Event	Location	Reign	Days	Notes	Ref.
1	Misae Genki	July 2, 2000	Hardcore Series II	Tokyo, Japan	1	120	Defeated Kiyoko Ichiki to win the inaugural title.	
2	Kiyoko Ichiki	October 30, 2000	Maximum Tag League 2000	Tokyo, Japan	1	<1	This was a Barbed Wire, Tables & Light Tubes Deathmatch.	
—	Vacated	October 30, 2000	Maximum Tag League II	Tokyo, Japan	—	—	Ichiki vacated the title immediately after winning it.	
3	Kaori Yoneyama	January 2, 2003	New Year Great Series	Tokyo, Japan	1	3,233	Defeated Princess Sandy to win the vacant title.	
—	Deactivated	November 9, 2011	Yoshihito Sasaki & Jaki Numazawa & Nikkan Lee 11th Anniversary	Tokyo, Japan	—	—	Due to her upcoming retirement, Kaori Yoneyama vacated the title after defending it against La☆Panda.	

== See also ==
- Professional wrestling in Japan
