= Fly To Everywhere World Championship =

Professional wrestling championship

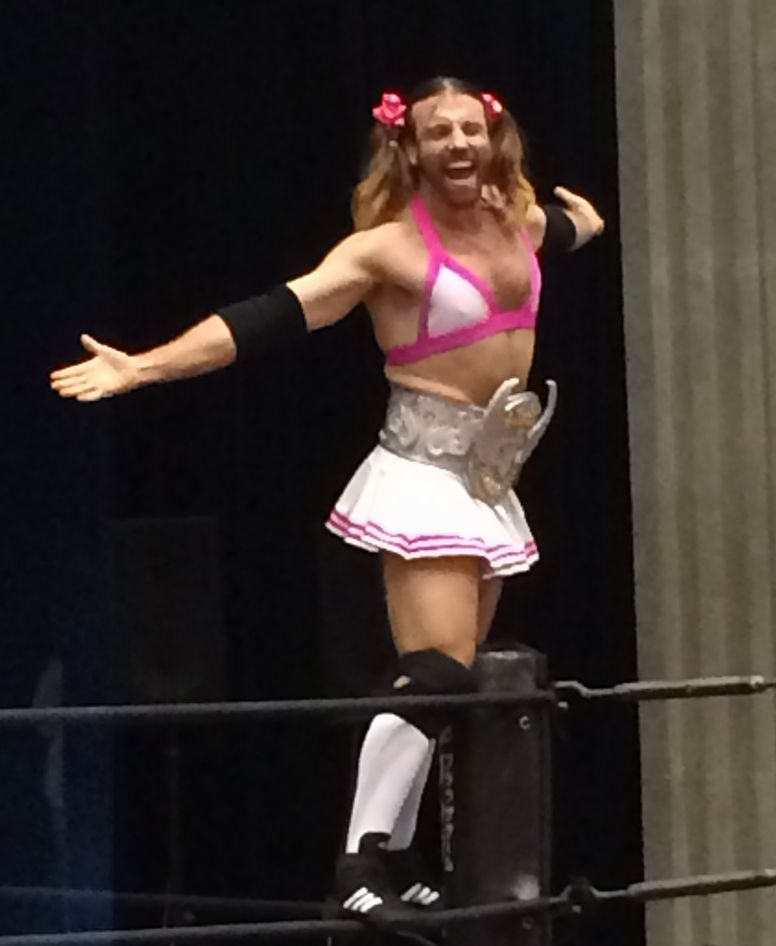
- Ladybeard holding the title in July 2014

Details
- Promotion: DDT Pro-Wrestling
- Date established: 2013
- Date retired: October 4, 2015

Other names
- Union Fly To Everywhere World Championship; Union Pro Fly To Everywhere World Championship
Statistics
- First champion: Kaori Yoneyama
- Final champion: Cherry
- Most reigns: Cherry (3 reigns)
- Longest reign: Cherry (412 days)
- Shortest reign: Cherry (19 days)

The Fly To Everywhere World Championship (Japanese: Fly to Everywhereワールドチャンピオンシップ, Hepburn: Furai Tū Eburifeā Wārudo Chanpionshippu) was a women's professional wrestling championship in the Japanese promotion Union Pro Wrestling (UPW) when it was a sub-brand of DDT Pro-Wrestling. UPW also referred to the title as the "Union Fly To Everywhere World Championship" (Japanese: ユニオン認定Fly to Everywhereワールドチャンピオンシップ, Hepburn: Yunion-nintei Furai Tū Eburifeā Wārudo Chanpionshippu). Male wrestlers were eligible to compete for the title so long as they wore women's gear for their matches.

== Title history ==
Key
No.	Overall reign number
Reign	Reign number for the specific champion
Days	Number of days held
Defenses	Number of successful defenses

No.	Champion	Championship change			Reign statistics			Notes	Ref.
No.	Champion	Date	Event	Location	Reign	Days	Defenses	Notes	Ref.
1	Kaori Yoneyama	March 10, 2013	March of the Union 2013	Yokohama, Japan	1	54	1	Defeated Cherry to win the inaugural title.	
2	Cherry	May 3, 2013	Golden Union 2013	Tokyo, Japan	1	412	3	This was an elimination three-way match also involving Nazo Fukumen B.	
3	Lady Beard	June 19, 2014	Ame Ni Mo Makezu Union 2014	Tokyo, Japan	1	73	0		
4	Mio Shirai	August 31, 2014	Summer Festival Union 2014	Tokyo, Japan	1	182	2		
5	Cherry	March 1, 2015	March of Union in Osaka	Osaka, Japan	2	59	1		
6	Hibiscus Mii	April 29, 2015	Golden Union 2015	Tokyo, Japan	1	49	1	This was a three-way match also involving Aoi Ishibashi.	
7	Mio Shirai	June 17, 2015	Ame Ni Mo Makezu Union 2015	Tokyo, Japan	2	42	0		
8	Aoi Kizuki	July 29, 2015	New Ice Ribbon #666: Summer Jumbo Ribbon	Tokyo, Japan	1	48	0	This was a title vs. title match, in which Kizuki also defended the ICE×∞ Championship. This was an Ice Ribbon event.	
9	Cherry	September 15, 2015	Harvest Festival 2015	Tokyo, Japan	3	19	1	This was a two-out-of-three falls special rules match in which Cherry won 2–1. The first fall was a three-way match also involving Miyako Matsumoto; the second fall was a "Rock 'n' Roll Deathmatch"; the third fall was an "Irregular Count Fall Match".	
—	Deactivated	October 4, 2015	—	—	—	—	—	Championship deactivated when Union Pro folded.	

== Combined reigns ==
Rank	Wrestler	No. of reigns	Combined defenses	Combined days
1	Cherry	3	5	490
2	Mio Shirai	2	2	224
3	Lady Beard	1	0	73
4	Kaori Yoneyama	1	1	54
5	Hibiscus Mii	1	1	49
6	Aoi Kizuki	1	0	48

== See also ==
- DDT Pro-Wrestling
- Professional wrestling in Japan
