= Oz Academy Pioneer 3-Way Championship =

- Current title design (2022–present)

Details
- Promotion: Oz Academy
- Date established: April 3, 2022
- Current champion: Kakeru
- Date won: August 16, 2026
Statistics
- First champion: Masked Hanahana
- Most reigns: (2 reigns): Akino; Kaori Yoneyama; Masked Hanahana; Kakeru
- Longest reign: Kakeru (217 days)
- Shortest reign: Kaori Yoneyama (28 days)
- Oldest champion: Jaguar Yokota (63 years, 45 days)
- Youngest champion: Momoka Hanazono (22 years, 333 days)
- Heaviest champion: Akino and Sonoko Kato (65 kg (143 lb))
- Lightest champion: Momoka Hanazono (50 kg (110 lb))

The Oz Academy Pioneer 3-Way Championship (OZアカデミー認定パイオニア3WAY選手権王座, Ozu Akademī Nintei Paionia Surīwei Ōza) is a women's professional wrestling championship created and promoted by the Japanese professional wrestling promotion Oz Academy. The main characteristic of the title is that it can only be contested in three-way matches.

== Title history ==
On April 3, 2022, Masked Hanahana defeated Kaori Yoneyama and Yumi Ohka in a three-way match to become the inaugural champion. On April 13, 2025, the 10th champion Mayumi Ozaki was stripped from the title after not being able to defend it in the scheduled match. Kakeru won the vacant championship after defeating Itsuki Aoki and Ram Kaicho. On November 23, the title was vacated for the second time due to the reigning championship Sonoko Kato's retirement.

== Reigns ==
As of November 14, 2026, there have been 13 reigns between 10 champions and two vacancies. Masked Hanahana was the inaugural champion. Kakeru has the longest reign at 217 days, while Sonoko Kato has the shortest reign at 7 days. Akino, Hanahana and Kaori Yoneyama have the most reigns at two. Jaguar Yokota is the oldest champion at 63 years old, while Momoka Hanazono is the youngest at 22 years old.

The current championship is Kakeru, who defeated Ryo Mizunami and Akino in a three-way match on August 16, 2026 at OZ Academy OZ 30th & OZAKI 40th ~ Plum No Hanasaku OZ No Kuni in Tokyo, Japan.

Key
No.	Overall reign number
Reign	Reign number for the specific champion
Days	Number of days held
Defenses	Number of successful defenses
+	Current reign is changing daily

No.	Champion	Championship change			Reign statistics			Notes	Ref.
No.	Champion	Date	Event	Location	Reign	Days	Defenses	Notes	Ref.
1	Masked Hanahana	April 3, 2022	Battle Big Bonus in Korakuen	Tokyo, Japan	1	119	0	Hanahana defeated Kaori Yoneyama and Yumi Ohka in a three-way match to become the inaugural champion.	
2	Akino	July 31, 2022	Battle Big Bonus in Nagoya	Nagoya, Japan	1	49	0	This was a three-way match also involving Momoka Hanazono.	
3	Kaori Yoneyama	September 18, 2022	Bad Moon Rising at Osaka	Osaka, Japan	1	28	0	This was a three-way match also involving Tsubasa Kuragaki.	
4	Momoka Hanazono	October 16, 2022	Battle Big Bonus in Okinawa	Naha, Japan	1	189	2	This was a three-way match also involving Masked Hanahana.	
5	Kaori Yoneyama	April 23, 2023	OZ Academy Battle Big Bonus in Korakuen	Tokyo, Japan	2	98	0	This was a three-way match also involving Kohaku.	
6	Itsuki Aoki	July 30, 2023	OZ Academy Battle Big Bonus in Nagoya	Nagoya, Japan	1	153	2	This was a three-way match also involving Kakeru.	
7	Akino	December 30, 2023	OZ Academy Pray For Me	Tokyo, Japan	2	120	0	This was a three-way match also involving Ram Kaicho.	
8	Masked Hanahana	April 28, 2024	OZ Academy Battle Big Bonus 2024	Tokyo, Japan	2	133	1	This was a three-way match also involving Leon.	
9	Jaguar Yokota	September 8, 2024	OZ Academy Battle Big Bonus 2024 Fukuoka	Fukuoka, Japan	1	77	0	This was a three-way match also involving Unagi Sayaka.	
10	Mayumi Ozaki	November 24, 2024	OZ Academy Battle Big Bonus 2024 Okinawa	Naha, Japan	1	116	1	This was a three-way match also involving Akino.	
—	Vacated	March 20, 2025	OZ Academy Battle Big Bonus 2025	Tokyo, Japan	—	—	—	Mayumi Ozaki was stripped from the title due for not being able to defend it in the scheduled event.	
11	Kakeru	April 13, 2025	OZ Academy Battle Big Bonus 2025	Tokyo, Japan	1	217	2	Defeated Itsuki Aoki and Ram Kaicho in a three-way match to win the vacant title.	
12	Sonoko Kato	November 16, 2025	OZ Academy Battle Big Bonus 2025 in Okinawa	Naha, Japan	1	7	0	This was a three-way match also involving Akino.	
—	Vacated	November 23, 2025	OZ Academy Sonoko Kato Retirement ~ Final Blue Dragon	Tokyo, Japan	—	—	—	Sonoko Kato relinquished the title due to her retirement.	
13	Ryo Mizunami	April 26, 2026	OZ Academy Battle Big Bonus 2026	Tokyo, Japan	1	112	1	Defeated Rin and Rina Yamashita in a three-way match to win the vacant title.	
14	Kakeru	August 16, 2026	OZ Academy OZ 30th & OZAKI 40th	Tokyo, Japan	2	90+	2	This was a three-way match also involving Akino.	

=== Combined reigns ===
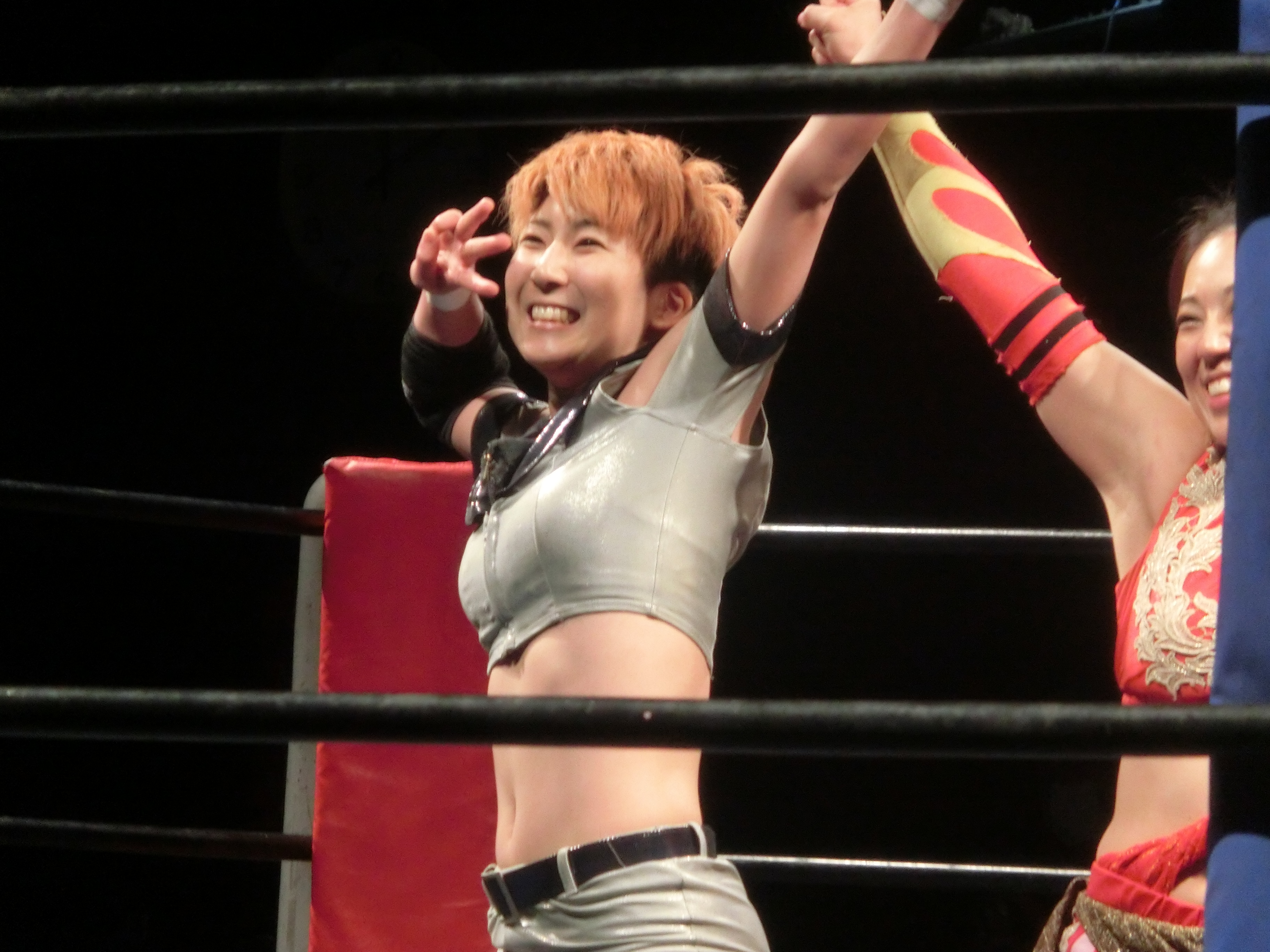
Two-time and current champion Kakeru holds the record for longest combined days at 307+ and the longest single reign at 217 days.

As of November 14, 2026.

†	Indicates the current champion

Rank	Wrestler	No. of reigns	Combined defenses	Combined days
1	Kakeru †	2	4	307+
2	Masked Hanahana	2	1	252
3	Momoka Hanazono	1	2	189
4	Akino	2	0	169
5	Itsuki Aoki	1	2	153
6	Kaori Yoneyama	2	0	126
7	Mayumi Ozaki	1	1	116
8	Ryo Mizunami	1	1	112
9	Jaguar Yokota	1	0	77
10	Sonoko Kato	1	0	7
