= Cherry (Japanese wrestler) =

Japanese professional wrestler

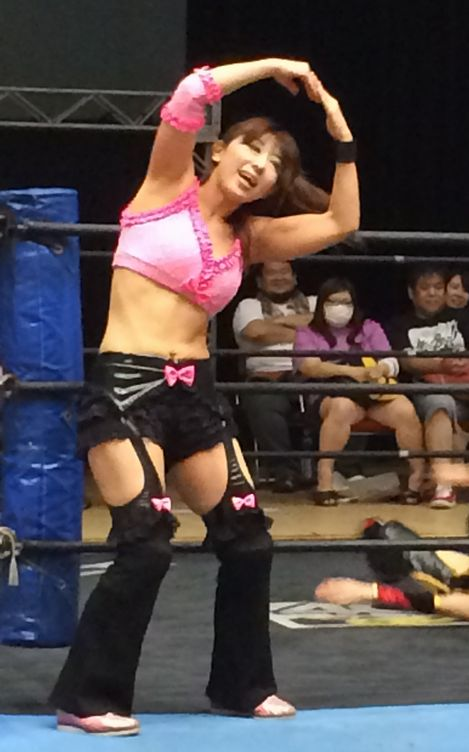
- Cherry in 2014

Personal information
- Born: May 14, 1974 (age 52) Saitama, Japan

Professional wrestling career
- Ring name(s): Uchu Ginga Senshi Sophia; Sakuran Bonita; Karate Cherry; Cherry
- Billed height: 157 cm (5 ft 2 in)
- Billed weight: 52 kg (115 lb)
- Trained by: Jaguar Yokota
- Debut: 2004

Cherry (チェリー, Cherī) is a Japanese professional wrestler currently working as a freelancer and is best known for her tenure with various promotions such as DDT Pro-Wrestling (DDT) and Pro Wrestling Wave.

== Professional wrestling career ==
=== DDT Pro-Wrestling (2004–2022) ===
In 2004, Cherry made her professional wrestling debut at Non-Fix 6/16 In Kitazawa Town Hall, an event promoted by DDT Pro-Wrestling on June 16, 2004, where she teamed up with Mineo Fujita to defeat Masahiro Takanashi and Showa-ko in an intergender tag team match.

Cherry also took part in the Peter Pan series of events, appearing mostly in rumble rules matches. She marked her first appearance at Ryōgoku Peter Pan 2011 on July 24, where she took part in an Ironman rumble rules match also involving Tsuyoshi Kikuchi, Yuzuki Aikawa, Daisuke Sasaki and others. At Ryōgoku Peter Pan 2013 on August 18, she teamed up with Masahiro Takanashi and Saki Akai to defeat Hiroshi Fukuda, Yoshiko and Hikaru Shida. At Ryōgoku Peter Pan 2016 on August 28, she competed in a rumble rules match for the Ironman Heavymetalweight Championship also involving Guanchulo, Joey Ryan, Reika Saiki, Kenso and others. At Ryōgoku Peter Pan 2017 on August 20, Cherry competed in a rumble rules match for the Ironman Heavymetalweight Championship also involving the winner Yuu, Yuka Sakazaki, Mizuki, Yuna Manase, Miyu Yamashita and others.

She participated in signature events of DDT such as Into The Fight. The last event of the series in which she competed was Into The Fight 2017 on February 19, where she teamed up with Michael Nakazawa, Masahiro Takanashi and Tomomitsu Matsunaga in a losing effort against T2Hii (Sanshiro Takagi, Toru Owashi and Kazuki Hirata) and Saki Akai in a Loser Exiled Overseas eight-person tag team match.

Another popular DDT event in which she took part was Judgement. Her first match in this event took place at DDT 8th Anniversary: Judgement 9 on March 27, 2005, where she fell short to Masahiro Takanashi. At Judgement 2016: DDT 19th Anniversary on March 21, she competed in a rumble rules battle royal for a chance to challenge anytime for the KO-D Openweight Championship also involving Ryuichi Sekine, Ken Ohka, Soma Takao and others. At Judgement 2017: DDT 20th Anniversary on March 20, she teamed up with Aja Kong and Miyu Yamashita, losing against Saki Akai, Meiko Satomura and Shoko Nakajima in a six-woman tag team match. The last event in which she competed was Judgement 2018: DDT 21st Anniversary from March 25, where she teamed up with Tomomitsu Matsunaga, Hoshitango, Mad Paulie and Gota Ihashi to defeat Mizuki Watase, Rekka, Gran MilliMeters (Daiki Shimomura and Nobuhiro Shimatani) and Takato Nakano.

On December 15, 2019, at the D-Oh Grand Prix 2020 event in Harajuku, Cherry unsuccessfully challenged Gorgeous Matsuno for the O-40 Championship.

=== Independent circuit (2005–present) ===
Cherry is known to have competed in many promotions during her career. She stepped in the squared circle for World Wonder Ring Stardom at Stardom Season 9 Goddesses In Stars on October 27, 2012, where she teamed up with Act Yasukawa and Hikaru Shida in a losing effort to Kimura Monster-gun (Alpha Female, Hailey Hatred and Kyoko Kimura). She worked in a couple of matches for Shimmer Women Athletes, one of them taking place at SHIMMER Volume 112 on March 31, 2019, where she unsuccessfully challenged Dash Chisako, Ashley Vox and Kiera Hogan in a four-way match. Cherry competed at the Hana Kimura Memorial Show, an event promoted by Kyoko Kimura to mark one year from the passing of her daughter Hana on May 23, 2021, where she participated in a 28-person All-Star battle royal also involving popular wrestlers such as Jun Kasai, Jinsei Shinzaki, Gabai Jichan, Cima, Masato Tanaka, Super Delfin, Yuko Miyamoto and others.

==== Oz Academy (2007–2019) ====
Cherry made sporadic appearances in Oz Academy for a long period o time. She participated in a 50-women gauntlet match at OZ Academy/Manami Toyota Produce Manami Toyota 30th Anniversary, Manami Toyota's retirement show produced on November 3, 2017, where she went in a one-minute time-limit draw against Toyota. At OZ Academy Come Back To Shima! on May 26, 2019, she participated in a 13-woman battle royal also involving Mayumi Ozaki, Rina Yamashita, Sonoko Kato, Hiroyo Matsumoto, Himeka Arita and others. Her last match there took place at OZ Academy MIYAKO Again on November 4, 2019, where she fell short to Tsubasa Kuragaki.

==== Pro Wrestling Wave (2007–present) ====
Cherry is known for her long tenure with Pro Wrestling Wave. At WAVE The Virgin Mary Reina De Reinas 2012, an event promoted during the relationship between the promotion and Lucha Libre AAA Worldwide on November 27, she teamed up with Shuu Shibutani, losing to Makoto and Moeka Haruhi, Hikaru Shida and Nagisa Nozaki, Ryo Mizunami and Yuu Yamagata, and Aya Yuuki and Sawako Shimono in a five-way match.

She took part in the Catch the Wave tournament, making her debut in the 2009 edition of the event, where she placed herself in the "Comical" block, scoring a total of three points after competing against Bullfight Sora, Gami and Ran Yu-Yu. At the 2010 edition, she took part of the "Rival" block, scoring a total of five points after competing against Ayumi Kurihara, Asami Kawasaki, Shuu Shibutani and Moeka Haruhi. At the 2011 edition, she placed herself in the "Visual" block, scoring a total of three points after competing against Toshie Uematsu, Tomoka Nakagawa, Kana and Ryo Mizunami. At the 2012 edition, after placing herself in the "Black Dahlia" block, she scored four points after facing two new opponents, Yumi Ohka and Misaki Ohata. At the 2013 edition, she competed in the "Slender" block, gaining a total of six points after going against Syuri, Arisa Nakajima, Mio Shirai and others.

== Championships and accomplishments ==
- DDT Pro-Wrestling
  - Fly To Everywhere World Championship (3 times)
  - Ironman Heavymetalweight Championship (22 times)
  - SGP Global Junior Heavyweight Championship (1 time)
- Ice Ribbon
  - Triangle Ribbon Championship (3 times)
  - WUW World Underground Wrestling Women's Championship (1 time)
- Oz Academy
  - Oz Academy Pioneer 3-Way Championship (2 times)
- Pro Wrestling Wave
  - Wave Tag Team Championship (2 times) – with Kaori Yoneyama (1) and Shuu Shibutani (1)
  - Catch the Wave Award (1 time)
    - Special Award (2025) shared with Risa Sera and Sumire Natsu
- Pure-J
  - Daily Sports Women's Tag Team Championship (2 times) – with Leon (1) and Kazuki (1)
- World Woman Pro-Wrestling Diana
  - WWWD Queen Elizabeth Championship (1 time)
