= Hibiscus Mii =

Female professional wrestler

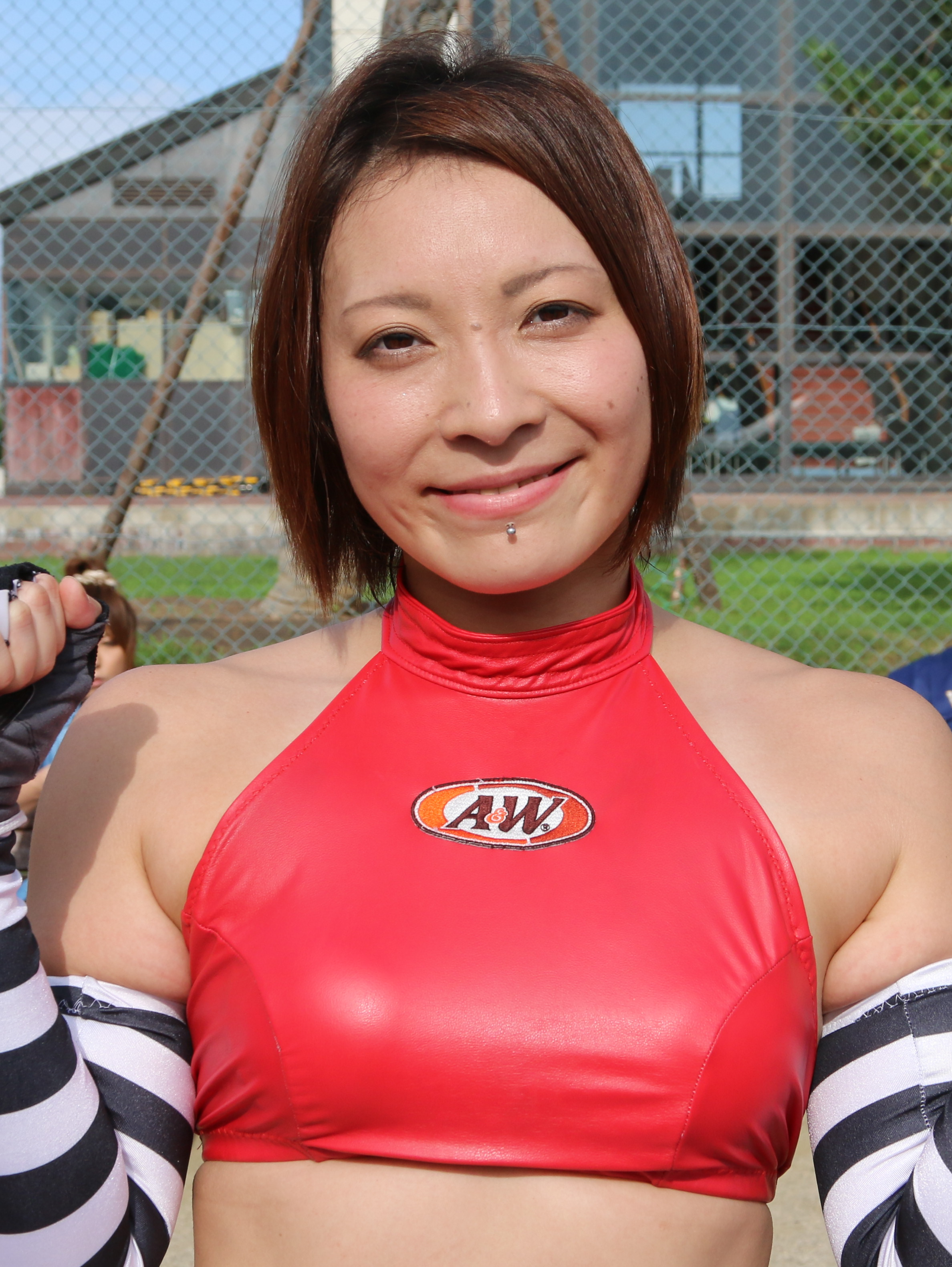
- Mii in August 2015

Personal information
- Born: June 14, 1985 (age 41) Tenri, Nara, Japan

Professional wrestling career
- Ring name(s): Apple Miyuki; Cosmic Warrior Justine; Hibiscus Mii; Miyuki Matsuyama
- Billed height: 1.52 m (5 ft 0 in)
- Billed weight: 50 kg (110 lb)
- Trained by: Taka Michinoku
- Debut: January 14, 2002

Hibiscus Mii (ハイビスカスみぃ, Haibisukasu Mii) (born June 14, 1985) is a female professional wrestler, who currently works for Ryukyu Dragon Pro Wrestling. She is better known under her previous ring name Apple Miyuki (アップルみゆき, Appuru Miyuki), under which she worked mainly for the Kaientai Dojo and Osaka Pro Wrestling promotions.

== Professional wrestling career ==
She debuted on January 14, 2002, in Puerto Rico against another Kaientai Dojo wrestler, Ofune. While Ofune was becoming the promotion's top female wrestler, Apple sat back and was in the middle of the card, wrestling in more comedy matches while slowly getting over and gaining more experience. She also worked for JDStar, where she gained even more valuable experience. When Ofune was injured in 2005, Apple was brought into a more prominent role, first gaining the respect of fellow K-Dojo wrestler YOSHIYA, the final match of their series being a hardcore match. They teamed up from then, as the once defunct WEW Hardcore Tag Team Championship were brought back into use, and they became the first team to hold them. Apple was also the first female wrestler to hold one of the belts, and the first woman in Kaientai Dojo to hold a belt, something replicated only once by Tomoka Nakagawa. Apple fused her high-flying offense with the hardcore style, and she was quickly over with the fans, taking bumps that women would not normally take.

At the end of 2005, Apple and YOSHIYA were awarded the K-AWARD for best Tag Match that year. 2006 saw Apple's hot run continue, with a shot at the UWA Middleweight Title against then champion PSYCHO, although she was defeated. In late 2006, however, things became a little rocky for Apple, as she was turned on by YOSHIYA during a 3-way tag match for the WEW Hardcore Tag Titles, who then created the group "Omega" with Makoto Oishi, Shiori Asahi, Bambi, and MIYAWAKI. Apple originally declared war on YOSHIYA, but then changed her focus to Bambi, one of the other girls on the roster. With Bambi injured, Apple then took a break from the war against Omega to team with the rookies, adding star power that would not normally be there.

The year 2007 saw a change for Apple, as with GET and RAVE being combined. She had a small feud with Yu Yamagata to see who was the top women's wrestler in K-Dojo. They had two matches against each other, splitting them both, before throwing away their differences, and they have yet to have had a third singles match.

In March 2013, Miyuki announced that she was joining the new Ryukyu Dragon Pro Wrestling promotion, adopting the new ring name Hibiscus Mii in the process.

== Championships and accomplishments ==
- Dramatic Dream Team
  - Ironman Heavymetalweight Championship (3 times)
- Kaientai Dojo
  - WEW Hardcore Tag Team Championship (2 times) - with YOSHIYA
  - K-AWARD - Best Tag Match (2005)
- Osaka Pro Wrestling
  - Osaka Pro Wrestling Battle Royal Championship (1 time)
- Pro Wrestling Society
  - PWS Losers Weight Championship (1 time)
- Pro Wrestling Wave
  - Wave Tag Team Championship (2 times) – with Yuki Miyazaki (1) and Ranmaru (1)
  - Catch the Wave Award (1 time)
    - Technique Award (2021)
- Union Pro Wrestling
  - Fly To Everywhere World Championship (1 time)
