= Kaori Yoneyama =

Japanese professional wrestler (born 1981)

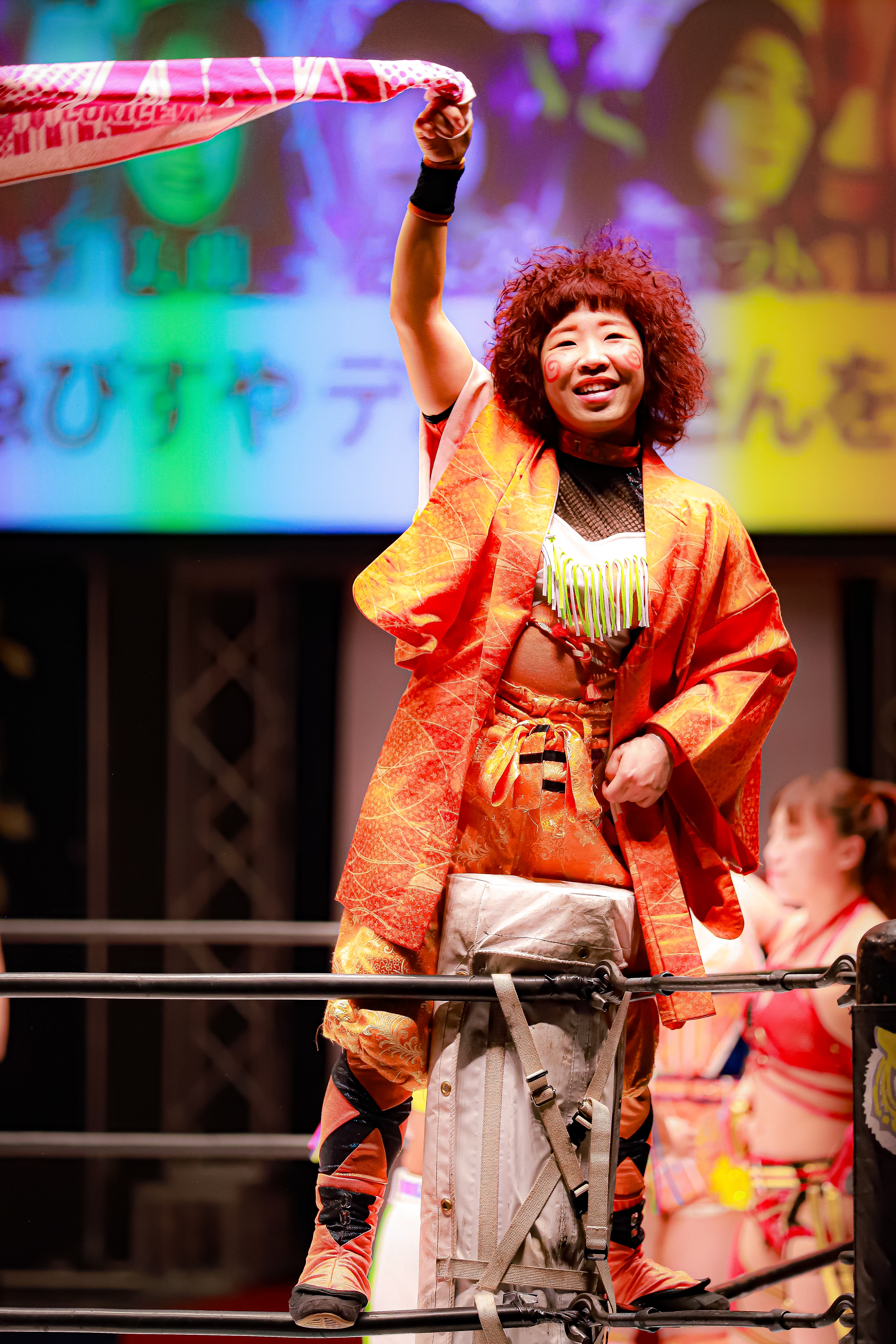
- Yoneyama in April 2023

Personal information
- Born: Kaori Yoneyama; February 26, 1981 (age 45) Zushi, Kanagawa
- Website: www.kaoriyoneyama.com

Professional wrestling career
- Ring name(s): Black Paranoia; Corner Post; Denpakamen Jossuru; Death Yama-san; Fuka Kidd; Fukigen Death; Gokigen Death; Happy Pumpkin; Hebio Yoneyama; Kaori Haruyama; Kaori Yoneyama; Midnight Devil; Otaku-chan; Passion Seven; Sarubobo; T-2 Mask; Tsubasa Kuragaki; Yonehinode Kamen; Yone Michinoku; Yoneyamakao Lee; Yoneyama Santa
- Billed height: 1.50 m (4 ft 11 in)
- Billed weight: 56 kg (123 lb)
- Trained by: JWP dojo
- Debut: November 29, 1999

Kaori Yoneyama (米山 香織, Yoneyama Kaori; born February 26, 1981) is a Japanese professional wrestler, working as a freelancer on the Japanese independent circuit. Yoneyama started her career in 1999, working with the JWP Joshi Puroresu promotion. During the following years, she became a one-time JWP Openweight Champion, a one-time JWP Junior Champion, a five-time JWP Tag Team Champion, a one-time Pure-J Openweight Champion and a three-time Daily Sports Women's Tag Team Champion. Notable titles she has held outside of JWP include All Japan Women's Pro-Wrestling's AJW Championship and AJW Tag Team Championship, Ice Ribbon's International Ribbon Tag Team Championship, Big Japan Pro Wrestling's BJW Women's Championship, and NEO Japan Ladies Pro Wrestling's High Speed Championship. In July 2011, Yoneyama announced that she would be ending her twelve-year career the following December. After a retirement tour, which took Yoneyama not only across the Japanese independent circuit, but also to the United States, she announced during her retirement ceremony that she had changed her mind and decided to continue her career. In January 2013, Yoneyama quit JWP to become a freelancer, working for promotions such as Gatoh Move Pro Wrestling, Oz Academy, Union Pro Wrestling and World Wonder Ring Stardom.

== Professional wrestling career ==
=== JWP Joshi Puroresu (1999–2013) ===
Yoneyama made her professional wrestling debut for the JWP Joshi Puroresu promotion on November 29, 1999, in a match against Kayoko Haruyama, during which she suffered an eye injury, which forced her to take an early break from her new career. After making her return in early 2000, Yoneyama continued wrestling for JWP, but also made appearances in promotions such as All Japan Women's Pro-Wrestling (AJW), Big Japan Pro Wrestling (BJW), Hyper Visual Fighting Arsion, JDStar, International Wrestling Association of Japan, Ladies Legend Pro Wrestling (LLPW) and NEO Japan Ladies Pro Wrestling. Yoneyama won her first professional wrestling championship on July 6, 2002, when she defeated Erika Watanabe for the JWP Junior Championship. On July 20, Yoneyama and Kayoko Haruyama defeated Mika Nishio and Miyuki Fujii for the AJW Tag Team Championship, which was followed by Yoneyama defeating Fujii in a singles match on November 29 to win the AJW Championship. On January 2, 2003, Yoneyama won yet another title by defeating Princesa Sandy for the BJW Women's Championship. Her AJW Championship reign ended two days later, when she was defeated by Mika Nishio, and a month later she and Haruyama were stripped of the AJW Tag Team Championship.

On January 25, 2004, Yoneyama and Haruyama defeated Etsuko Mita and Misae Genki in a tournament final to win the JWP Tag Team Championship. On August 15, Yoneyama ended her two-year reign with the JWP Junior Championship by vacating the title. On December 12, Yoneyama and Haruyama lost the JWP Tag Team Championship to Akino and Tsubasa Kuragaki. Yoneyama would regain the title from Akino and Kuragaki on May 15, 2005, this time teaming with Toujyuki Leon. On August 7, Yoneyama defeated Tanny Mouse to become the 199th Dramatic Dream Team (DDT) Ironman Heavymetalweight Champion, but immediately afterwards vacated the title and entered a battle royal to determine the 200th champion. In the match, Mouse would regain the title. After a fifteen-month reign, Yoneyama and Leon lost the JWP Tag Team Championship to Ran Yu-Yu and Toshie Uematsu on August 6, 2006. While still maintaining JWP as her home promotion, in September 2006, Yoneyama began working regularly for her friend Emi Sakura's new Ice Ribbon promotion. Yoneyama ended the year by winning the Daily Sports Christmas Cup. On February 28, 2007, Yoneyama and Toshie Uematsu won a one night tournament to become the number one contenders to the JWP Tag Team Championship. However, they would fail to capture the championship in their title match against Kazuki and Sachie Abe on March 21. In late 2007, Yoneyama began feuding with JWP Openweight Champion Azumi Hyuga, which led to a title match between the two on December 9, where Hyuga retained her title. In January 2009, Yoneyama debuted a new character, Yoneyamakao Lee, a Chinese wrestler supposedly signed to the nonexistent New Beijing Pro Wrestling (NBPW) promotion. The character mainly made appearances for DDT, the inventors of the NBPW concept. On July 19, Yoneyama and Emi Sakura defeated Command Bolshoi and Megumi Yabushita for the JWP Tag Team and Daily Sports Women's Tag Team Championships. On August 2, Yoneyama defeated Pro Wrestling Wave representative Yumi Ohka in the finals to win the 2009 Natsu Onna Kettei Tournament. On September 20, Yoneyama made an appearance for NEO Japan Ladies Pro Wrestling, defeating Natsuki☆Taiyo for the NEO High Speed Championship. The following day, Yoneyama and Sakura won another championship by defeating Minori Makiba and Nanae Takahashi for Ice Ribbon's International Ribbon Tag Team Championship, meaning that, for the second time in her career, Yoneyama was now holding four different championships simultaneously. Yoneyama's and Sakura's three reigns ended on December 13, when they lost all of their tag team titles to Azumi Hyuga and Ran Yu-Yu.

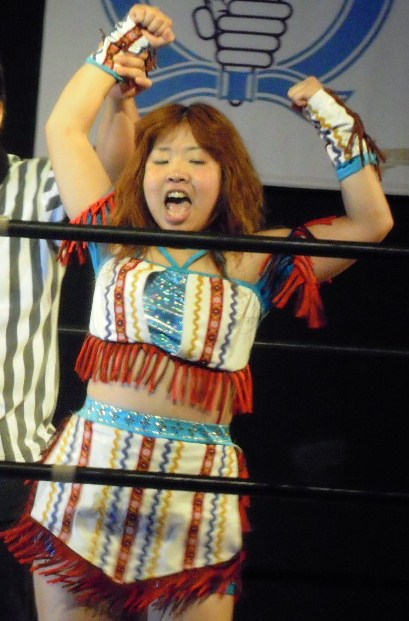
Yoneyama in June 2010

On July 4, 2010, Yoneyama defeated Kayoko Haruyama in a tournament final to become the number one contender to the JWP Openweight Championship. On July 18, Yoneyama defeated Nanae Takahashi to win the JWP Openweight Championship for the first time. Afterwards, Yoneyama announced that start of the "Yoneyama Revolution", during which she offered to defend the Openweight Championship against any wrestler from any promotion. On July 24, Yoneyama entered the 2010 Natsu Onna Kettei Tag Tournament, teaming with JWP founder and promoter Command Bolshoi, with the two defeating Kayoko Haruyama and Tanny Mouse in their first round match. On August 15, Yoneyama and Bolshoi first defeated Dynamite Kansai and Tsubasa Kuragaki in the semifinals and then Kagetsu and Leon in the finals to win the Natsu Onna Kettei Tag Tournament. On September 19, Yoneyama defeated former partner Emi Sakura in a JWP Openweight Championship vs. Hair match; as a result, Sakura was shaved bald. On October 10, Yoneyama faced American Hailey Hatred in a match, where she put her JWP Openweight Championship and Hatred her Absolute Intense Wrestling (AIW) Women's and Totally Lethal Wrestling (TLW) World Women's Championships on the line. After the first match ended in a double knockout, Yoneyama and Hatred wrestled another match, which also ended in a double knockout, meaning that both champions kept their titles. On November 22, Yoneyama made her debut for Smash at Smash.10, where she teamed with Emi Sakura in a tag team match, where they were defeated by Kana and Syuri. After the match, Yoneyama offered to defend the JWP Openweight Championship against Syuri. On November 30, Yoneyama and Hailey Hatred, known collectively as "Queens Revolution", defeated Cherry Bomb and Sexy Star at a Joshi 4 Hope event to become the inaugural TLW World Women's Tag Team Champions. Yoneyama returned to Smash on December 11 at Smash.11, where she teamed with Command Bolshoi to defeat Syuri and Nagisa Nozaki in a tag team match. On December 24 at Happening Eve, Yoneyama defeated Syuri in the main event to retain the JWP Openweight Championship. In January 2011, Yoneyama brought back the Yoneyamakao Lee character and, under it, began making regular appearances for Ice Ribbon. The following month, Yoneyamakao formed a tag team with Hikari Minami, which eventually led to the two unsuccessfully challenging Emi Sakura and Ray for the International Ribbon Tag Team Championship two months later. Back in JWP, Yoneyama and Hatred joined forces with Kyoko Kimura and Sayaka Obihiro to form a stable named Yoneyama Kakumei-gun ("Yoneyama Revolutionary Army"). On April 3, Yoneyama lost the JWP Openweight Championship to Leon in a match, which was also contested for the NEO High Speed Championship. Yoneyama's reign lasted 258 days and included record-setting ten successful title defenses, all against JWP outsiders as part of the "Yoneyama Revolution". Afterwards, Yoneyama was sidelined for two months with a mandible fracture.

On July 10, Yoneyama announced after a match that she was going to retire from professional wrestling at the end of the year. The announcement led to Yoneyama unsuccessfully challenging Hailey Hatred for the JWP Openweight, TLW World Women's and IMW Hybrid Fighting Championships on August 7. Yoneyama's retirement tour saw her make appearances for promotions such as Universal Woman's Pro Wrestling Reina, Pro Wrestling Wave, Oz Academy, Sendai Girls' Pro Wrestling, and Freedoms. On November 13, Yoneyama and Hatred put their TLW World Women's Tag Team Championship on the line against JWP Tag Team and Daily Sports Women's Tag Team Champions Kayoko Haruyama and Tsubasa Kuragaki. Yoneyama and Hatred went on to win the match to become Triple Crown Tag Team Champions. Yoneyama's retirement tour also led her to make her American debut, when she took part in Chikara's JoshiMania weekend as a last minute replacement for an injured Command Bolshoi. On December 2 in Philadelphia, Pennsylvania, Yoneyama teamed with Hanako Nakamori and Tsubasa Kuragaki to defeat Archibald Peck, El Hijo del Ice Cream and Ice Cream Jr. in an intergender six-person tag team match. The following day in Everett, Massachusetts, Yoneyama defeated Nakamori in a singles match. On the third and final night of the tour in Manhattan, New York, Yoneyama was defeated by Mayumi Ozaki in a singles match. On December 14, Yoneyama wrestled her Ice Ribbon farewell match, where she wrestled Hiroyo Matsumoto to a ten-minute time limit draw. On December 23, Yoneyama was defeated by Kayoko Haruyama in her retirement match. However, during the post-match ceremony, Yoneyama interrupted a ten bell salute to her career and announced that she had changed her mind and did not want to retire after all. The surprise turn led to JWP offering a refund to anyone who attended the show, announcing that in the future wrestlers would have to sign contracts to make sure they do retire after their retirement matches and finally stripping Queens Revolution of all three of their tag team championships. JWP also refunded tickets for all events from Yoneyama's retirement announcement to her supposed retirement match. Yoneyama later apologized for betraying the trust of her fans and co-workers and claimed that she had come to the decision to retire after her mandible fracture, feeling that, with her recent lengthy JWP Openweight Championship reign, she had done all she could in JWP and did not want to continue risking her health. However, gradually she started to have a change of heart brought on especially by her trip to the United States. Yoneyama continued wrestling for JWP on January 9 at the promotion's first event of 2012.

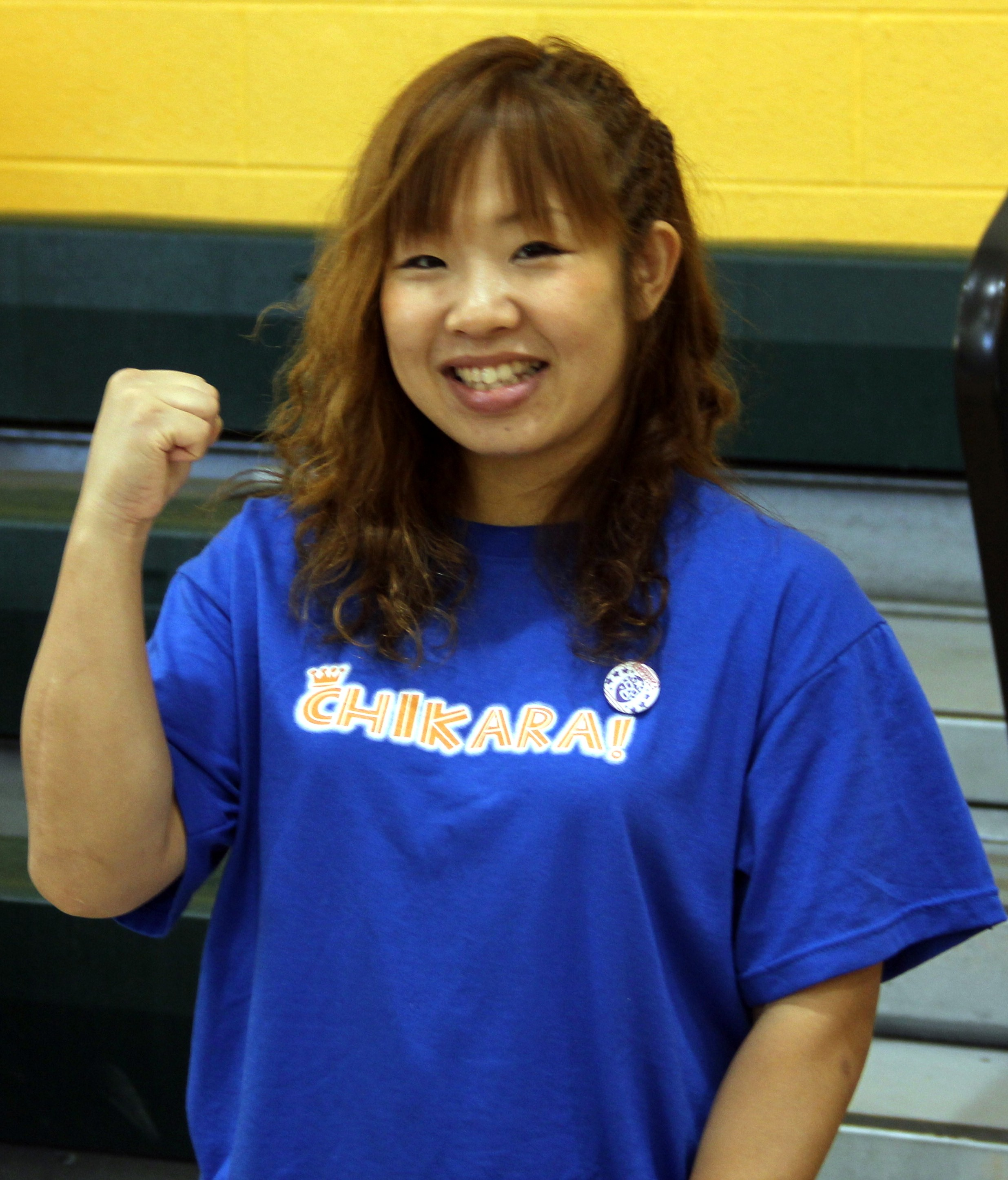
Yoneyama in September 2012

On April 22, Yoneyama faced Emi Sakura in a special singles match, where the loser would have to join the winner's promotion. Sakura won the match and, as a result, Yoneyama was forced to join her new Thailand-based Gatoh Move Pro Wrestling promotion. On May 4, Yoneyama and Sakura defeated Command Bolshoi and Rabbit Miu to win the vacant JWP Tag Team and Daily Sports Women's Tag Team Championships, taking the belts with them to Thailand three days later. Upon joining Gatoh Move, Yoneyama, along with male wrestler Madoka, began helping Sakura train wrestlers for the promotion. Yoneyama and Sakura, now known collectively as the "Tai-Pan Sisters", returned to JWP on June 17 to make their first successful defense of the JWP Tag Team and Daily Sports Women's Tag Team Championships against the team of Arisa Nakajima and Manami Katsu. Yoneyama and Sakura made their second successful defense on July 15 against the team of Kazuki and Morii, after which they changed their team name from the Tai-Pan Sisters to "Reset". On August 19, Reset lost the titles to Arisa Nakajima and Command Bolshoi in their third title defense. On September 9, Yoneyama and Sakura defeated Hanako Nakamori and Morii in a tag team match, after which the two agreed to join Reset to form the "Heart Move Kei Reform" (HMK) stable. On September 14, Yoneyama returned to the United States and Chikara as she, Command Bolshoi and Tsubasa Kuragaki entered the 2012 King of Trios in Easton, Pennsylvania, as Team JWP, defeating The Throwbacks (Dasher Hatfield, Mark Angelosetti and Matt Classic) in their opening match of the tournament. The following day, Team JWP was eliminated from the tournament in the quarter-finals, after losing to F.I.S.T. (Chuck Taylor, Icarus and Johnny Gargano). On the third and final day of the tournament, Yoneyama teamed with Manami Toyota in a tag team match, where they were defeated by Bolshoi and Kuragaki. Back in JWP, the first big match between HMK and the JWP Seikigun ("regular army") took place on October 7, when Yoneyama, Sakura, Nakamori and Morii defeated Arisa Nakajima, Command Bolshoi, Kayoko Haruyama and Manami Katsu 3–0 in an eight-woman captain's fall elimination tag team main event, with Yoneyama scoring the deciding pinfall over the JWP Openweight Champion Haruyama. Afterwards, Yoneyama was named the number one contender to Haruyama's title. On October 21, Yoneyama failed in her title challenge against Haruyama. On November 10, Yoneyama made a special appearance for Pro-Wrestling: EVE in Sudbury, Suffolk, England, teaming with April Davids in a tag team tournament. After defeating The Blossom Twins (Hannah and Holly) in their first round match, Yoneyama and Davids were defeated in the finals of the tournament by Bete Noire and Viper. On December 24 at JWP's year-end event, Yoneyama was defeated by Command Bolshoi in a singles grudge match. After the match, the two seemingly buried their hatchet. On January 6 at JWP's first event of 2013, Yoneyama and Morii were defeated in a tag team match by Kazuki and Sachie Abe, with Kazuki pinning Yoneyama for the win. Following the match, Yoneyama thanked the fans in attendance for their support during the past thirteen years and announced that she was resigning from the promotion. She, however, announced that she reveal the actual date of her resignation at a later date. JWP confirmed the upcoming resignation the following day. On January 13, Yoneyama teamed with Sareee in a tag team match, where they were defeated by Arisa Nakajima and Kay Lee Ray. Following the match, Yoneyama announced that she would be wrestling her final JWP match on January 27. On January 27, 2013, Yoneyama wrestled her JWP farewell match, a six-woman tag team match, where she, Hanako Nakamori and Morii were defeated by Arisa Nakajima, Command Bolshoi and Kana, with Nakajima pinning her for the win. Following the event, Yoneyama announced that in the future, she would be working as a freelancer.

=== Freelancing (2013–present) ===
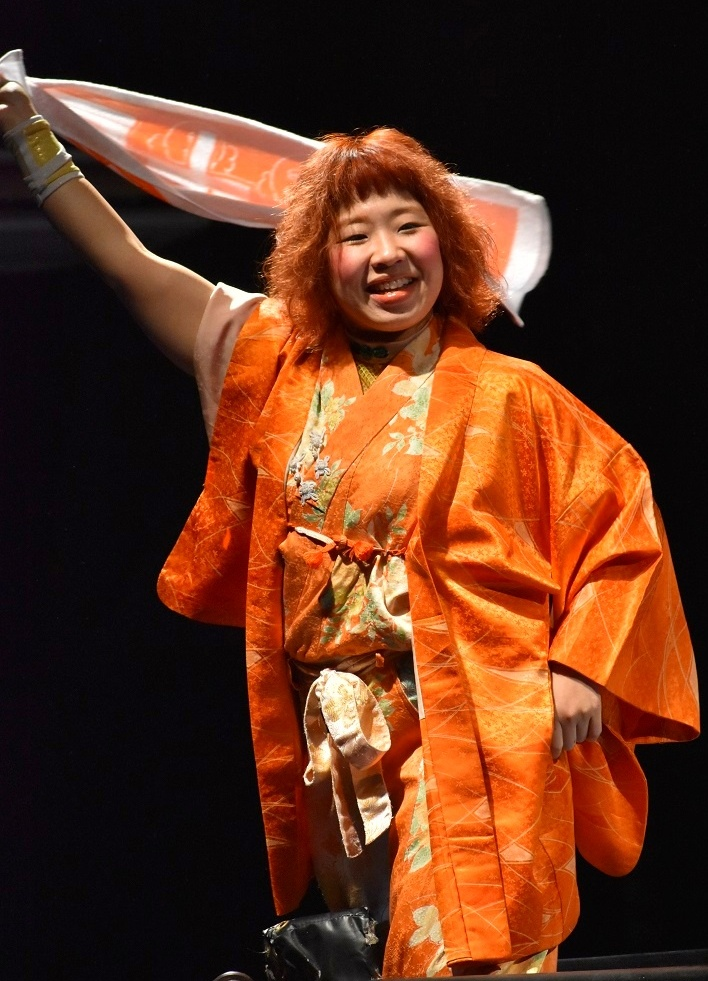
Yoneyama in December 2019

On February 13, 2013, Yoneyama earned the right to name and design Union Pro Wrestling's women's title by pinning Cherry in a tag team match, where she and Masako Takanashi defeated Cherry and Mio Shirai. Despite her big sendoff from JWP, Yoneyama continued making appearances for the promotion as a freelancer, making her first appearance just three weeks after her farewell match on February 17, when she teamed with Leon to defeat Hanako Nakamori and Morii in a tag team match. On March 10, Yoneyama defeated Cherry to become the inaugural Union Fly to Everywhere World Champion. Yoneyama made her first successful defense of the title on April 5 against Nazo Fukumen B. On May 3, Yoneyama lost the Fly to Everywhere World Championship to Cherry in a three-way elimination match, which also included Nazo Fukumen B. On September 16, Yoneyama produced her own independent event, which saw her team with Emi Sakura in a main event tag team match, where they defeated Hiroyo Matsumoto and "Kotori". On April 27, 2015, Yoneyama made her debut for the newly revived FMW promotion, teaming with Kagetsu in a tag team match, where they were defeated by Miss Mongol and Ray. On December 13, Yoneyama and Tsubasa Kuragaki defeated Kagetsu and Kaho Kobayashi to win the Oz Academy Tag Team Championship. On December 22, Yoneyama defeated DJ Nira at Gatoh Move's year-end show to win the IWA Triple Crown Championship. She lost the title to Riho on June 22, 2016. On September 11, Yoneyama and Kuragaki lost the Oz Academy Tag Team Championship to Hikaru Shida and Syuri. On July 2, 2017, Yoneyama and Cherry defeated Yuki Miyazaki and Yumi Ohka to win the Wave Tag Team Championship. They lost the title to Hiroe Nagahama and Kaho Kobayashi in their first defense on August 12. In October, Yoneyama returned to the United States to work Shimmer Women Athletes' October 18 and 19 tapings. On the first day, she teamed with Akino and Tsukasa Fujimoto to defeat Kellie Skater, Mia Yim and Tomoka Nakagawa on Volume 67, before teaming with Fujimoto on Volume 68 to unsuccessfully challenge Skater and Nakagawa for the Shimmer Tag Team Championship. The following day, Yoneyama and Fujimoto defeated Nevaeh and Sassy Stephie on Volume 69, before Yoneyama ended her weekend by losing to Nikki Storm on Volume 70.

==== World Wonder Ring Stardom (2013-present) ====
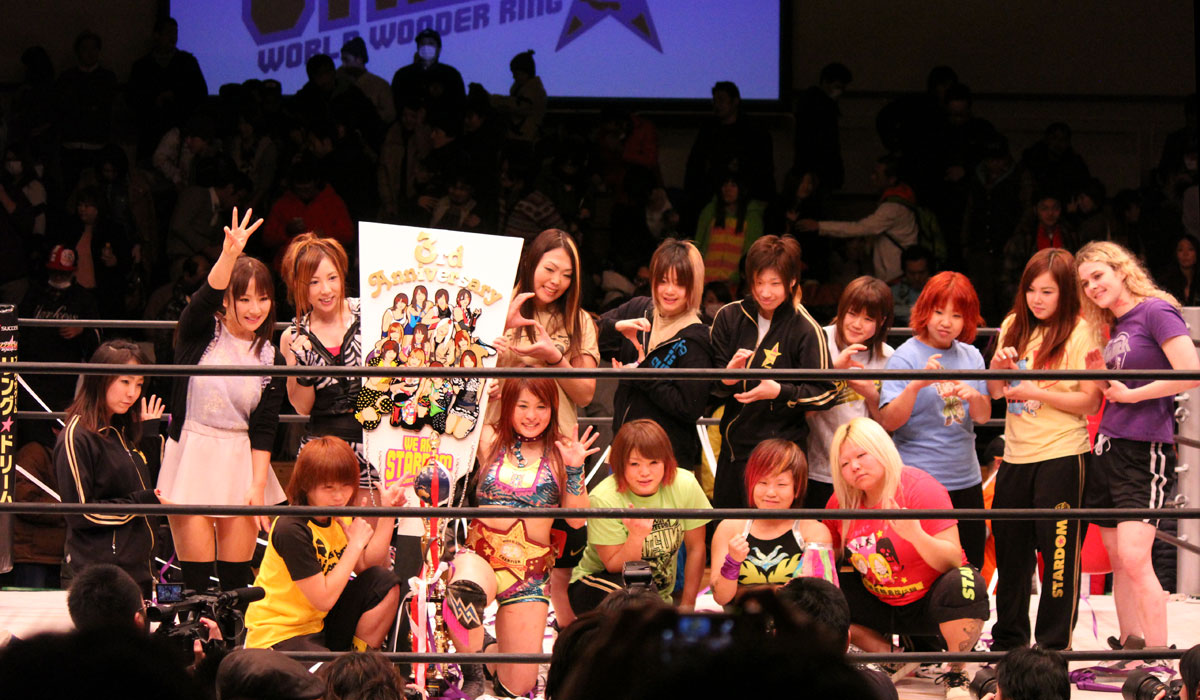
Yoneyama (the third from the right of the upper row) at Stardom's Anniversary Show in April 2014.

On February 3, 2013, Yoneyama made a surprise appearance for the World Wonder Ring Stardom promotion, affiliating herself with Nanae Takahashi's Nanae Gundan stable and challenging Natsuki☆Taiyo to a match for the High Speed Championship. The title match was made official on February 12. On March 3, Yoneyama failed to capture the High Speed Championship from Natsuki☆Taiyo, when their title match ended in a thirty-minute time-limit draw. On April 29, Yoneyama took part in the Ryōgoku Cinderella event at Ryōgoku Kokugikan, teaming with Hiroyo Matsumoto and Syuri in a six-woman tag team match, where they were defeated by Mika Nagano, Nanae Takahashi and Tsukasa Fujimoto. On June 2, Yoneyama defeated Natsuki☆Taiyo in a rematch to win the High Speed Championship for the second time. On June 23, Yoneyama, Kairi Hojo and Yuhi defeated Kimura Monster-gun (Christina Von Eerie, Hailey Hatred and Kyoko Kimura) in a decision match to win the vacant Artist of Stardom Championship. On July 7, Yoneyama made her first successful defense of the High Speed Championship against Mayu Iwatani. Yoneyama, Hojo and Yuhi made their first successful defense of the Artist of Stardom Championship on August 17 against Kawasaki Katsushika Saikyou Densetsu (Act Yasukawa, Natsuki☆Taiyo and Yoshiko). From August 25 to September 23, Yoneyama took part in the 5★Star Grand Prix tournament of 2013, where she finished with a record of two wins and three losses, failing to qualify for the finals. On October 14, Yoneyama, Hojo and Yuhi, now known collectively as "Chibis", made their second successful defense of the Artist of Stardom Championship against Hiroyo Matsumoto, Mayu Iwatani and Miho Wakizawa. On October 20, Yoneyama and Yuhi entered the 2013 Goddesses of Stardom Tag League, but were eliminated in their first round match by Act Yasukawa and Kyoko Kimura. On November 4 at Stardom's 100th event, Chibis lost the Artist of Stardom Championship to the Kimura Monster-gun (Alpha Female, The Female Predator "Amazon" and Kyoko Kimura) in their third title defense. In November 2013, Yoneyama and Madoka began producing small independent events under the name YMZ (Yoneyamadoka da ze). On December 23, Yoneyama made her second successful defense of the High Speed Championship against Yuhi. Six days later, Yoneyama lost the title back to Natsuki☆Taiyo in her third defense.

A rematch between the two took place on February 2, 2014, in which Taiyo retained the High Speed title. On February 9, Chibis received a rematch for the Artist of Stardom Championship, but were defeated by the defending champions, Tawashis (Hiroyo Matsumoto, Mayu Iwatani and Miho Wakizawa). Yoneyama attempted to regain the title from Tawashis with new partners, but failed alongside Hatsuhinode Kamen and Kellie Skater on March 16 and Kamen and Sayaka Obihiro on June 1. On April 29, Yoneyama was defeated by Natsuki☆Taiyo in a two out of three falls match for the High Speed Championship. On May 3, Yoneyama and Madoka won Gatoh Move's second annual Go Go! Green Curry Khob Khun Cup, a tournament for mixed tag team teams, defeating Emi Sakura and Masa Takanashi in the finals. On August 10, Yoneyama regained the Artist of Stardom Championship from the Tawashis, alongside Hatsuhinode Kamen and the debuting Tsubasa Kuragaki. At Mask Fiesta 2014 on October 26, Yoneyama, performing under the name Yonehinode Kamen, teamed up with Hatsuhinode Kamen in a loss to Risa Sera and Takumi Iroha. On December 7, Yoneyama, Kamen and Kuragaki lost the Artist of Stardom Championship to Io Shirai, Mayu Iwatani and Takumi Iroha in their first title defense.

On June 17, 2017, Yoneyama won the Artist of Stardom Championship for the third time, when she, Hiroyo Matsumoto and Jungle Kyona defeated AZM, HZK and Io Shirai for the title. On August 13, 2017, Yoneyama, Kyona and Matsumoto lost the Artist of Stardom Championship to HZK, Io Shirai and Viper, also in their first defense. At Mask Fiesta 2018 on October 28, 2018, Yoneyama debuted as Happy Pumpkin in a win over Gao.

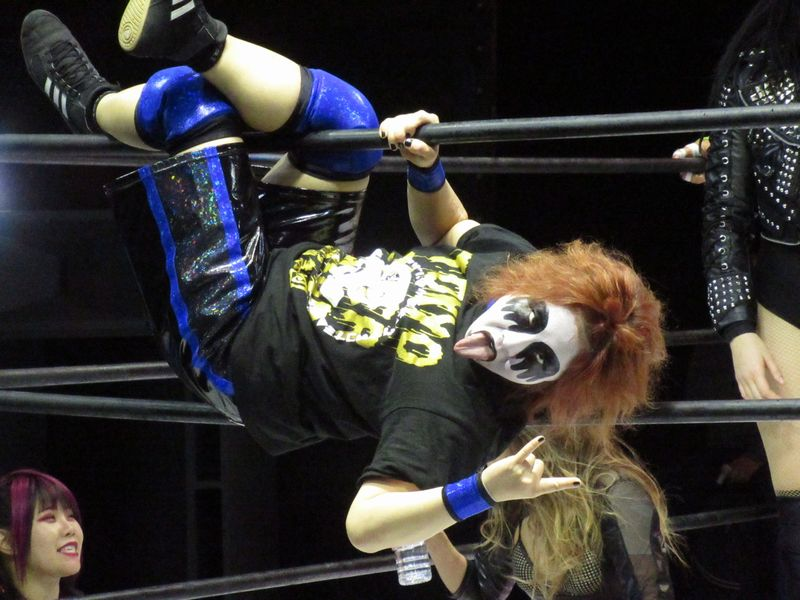
While being part of the Tokyo Cyber Squad stable, Yoneyama adopted the gimmick of "Death Yama-san".

At the 2019 Stardom Draft on April 14, 2019, Yoneyama was drafted to the International Army stable, later known as Tokyo Cyber Squad. At Stardom Yokohama Cinderella 2020 on October 3, 2020, Yoneyama fell short to Natsupoi in a Singles match. On the same night, Jungle Kyona and Konami lost to Oedo Tai's Natsuko Tora and Saki Kashima in a Losing unit must disband match, as Tokyo Cyber Squad folded to mourn the death of their former leader Hana Kimura. Yoneyama received the invitation of joining Mayu Iwatani's unit of Stars which she accepted and switched her gimmick to "Gokigen Death" in the process. At Stardom Osaka Dream Cinderella 2020 on December 20, Yoneyama teamed up with her new stablemates Mayi Iwatani and Starlight Kid, and unsuccessfully challenged Cosmic Angels (Mina Shirakawa, Tam Nakano and Unagi Sayaka) for the Artist of Stardom Championship.

At Stardom 10th Anniversary Show on January 17, 2021, Yoneyama unsuccessfully challenged AZM for the High Speed Championship. At Stardom All Star Dream Cinderella on March 3, 2021, she participated in a 24-women Stardom All Star Rumble featuring various active stars such as Mei Hoshizuki and Bea Priestley, and from the past such as Chigusa Nagayo, Kyoko Inoue, Mima Shimoda, Hiroyo Matsumoto, Emi Sakura, Momoe Nakanishi and others. At Stardom Yokohama Dream Cinderella 2021 on April 4, Yoneyama teamed up with Mayu Iwatani, Saya Iida, Starlight Kid and Hanan, falling short to Oedo Tai's Natsuko Tora, Ruaka, Konami, Saki Kashima and Rina as a result of a Ten-woman elimination tag team match. Since Yoneyama was last eliminated, she was forced to quit Stars and join Oedo Tai. At Stardom Cinderella Tournament 2021, she fell short to Mayu Iwatani in the first round matches from April 10. At Yokohama Dream Cinderella 2021 in Summer on July 4, Yoneyama teamed up with to defeat Maika and Lady C, Hanan and Hina, and Saki Kashima and Rina in a Gauntlet tag team match. At the Stardom 5 Star Grand Prix 2021, Yoneyama fought in the "Red Stars" block where she scored a total of ten points after competing against Momo Watanabe, Mayu Iwatani, Koguma, Starlight Kid, Himeka, Natsupoi, Giulia, Mina Shirakawa and Saki Kashima. At Stardom 10th Anniversary Grand Final Osaka Dream Cinderella on October 9, 2021, Yoneyama unsuccessfully challenged Starlight Kid for the High Speed Championship. At the 2021 Goddesses of Stardom Tag League, Yoneyama teamed up with Saki Kashima as "I love HigashiSpo!" and fought in the "Red Goddess" block where they scored a total of four points after competing against the teams of FWC (Hazuki and Koguma), AphrOditE (Saya Kamitani and Utami Hayashishita), Himepoi '21 (Himeka and Natsupoi), Cosmic Angels (Unagi Sayaka and Mai Sakurai), and Water & Oil (Hanan and Rina). Yoneyama and Kashima wrestled one of their league match at Kawasaki Super Wars, the first event of the Stardom Super Wars which took place on November 3, 2021, where they defeated Hanan and Rina. At Tokyo Super Wars on November 27, Yoneyama teamed up with Saki Kashima and Rina falling short to Mayu Iwatani, Hazuki and Hanan. At Stardom Dream Queendom on December 29, 2021, Yoneyama won a five-way match also involving Waka Tsukiyama, Lady C, Saki Kashima and Rina.

At Stardom Nagoya Supreme Fight on January 29, 2022, Yoneyama competed in the same kind of five-way match, this time competing alongside her Oedo Tai stablemates Ruaka, Saki Kashima and Rina, getting defeated by Momo Kohgo. At Stardom Cinderella Journey on February 23, 2022, she teamed up with Saki Kashima, falling short to Mayu Iwatani and Tam Nakano. On the first night of the Stardom World Climax 2022 from March 26, Yoneyama teamed up with Saki Kashima and Ruaka and competed in a six-woman tag team gauntlet match won by Donna Del Mondo (Himeka, Natsupoi and Mai Sakurai) and also involving Queen's Quest (AZM, Lady C and Miyu Amasaki) and Cosmic Angels (Waka Tsukiyama & Mina Shirakawa) and Momo Kohgo. At Stardom Cinderella Tournament 2022, she fell short to Koguma in the first rounds of April 3. At Stardom Flashing Champions on May 28, 2022, she unsuccessfully challenged Mayu Iwatani for the SWA World Championship. At Mid Summer Champions in Tokyo, the first event of the Stardom Mid Summer Champions series which took place on July 9, 2022, Yoneyama teamed up with Saki Kashima, Ruaka ad Rina to defeat Stars (Mayu Iwatani, Hazuki, Koguma and Saya Iida). At Mid Summer Champions in Nagoya on July 24, she teamed up with Ruaka and fell short to Mayu Iwatani and Momo Kohgo. At the Stardom 5 Star Grand Prix 2022, Yoneyama did not compete in either of the blocks but made an appearance on the first night of the tournament from July 30, 2022, where she competed in a tag team gauntlet match. At Stardom in Showcase vol.1, the first event of the non-canon "Showcase" branch of events which took place on September 25, 2022, Yoneyama won an 18-woman Nagoya rumble match where she appeared under her old Stars gimmick of "Gokigen Death".

== Championships and accomplishments ==
- All Japan Women's Pro-Wrestling

- AJW Championship (1 time)
- AJW Tag Team Championship (2 times) – with Kayoko Haruyama (1) and Saki Maemura (1)

- Big Japan Pro Wrestling

- BJW Women's Championship (1 time)

- DDT Pro-Wrestling

- Ironman Heavymetalweight Championship (1 time)

- Gatoh Move Pro Wrestling

- IWA Triple Crown Championship (1 time)
- Asia Dream Tag Team Championship (1 time) — with Emi Sakura
- Go Go! Green Curry Khob Khun Cup (2014) – with Madoka

- Ice Ribbon

- International Ribbon Tag Team Championship (1 time) – with Emi Sakura
- Triangle Ribbon Championship (4 times)

- JWP Joshi Puroresu/Pure-J

- Daily Sports Women's Tag Team Championship (6 times) – with Emi Sakura (2), Hailey Hatred (1), Kakeru Sekiguchi (1), Leon (1) and Kazuki (1)
- JWP Junior Championship (1 time)
- JWP Openweight Championship (1 time)
- JWP Tag Team Championship (5 times) – with Emi Sakura (2), Hailey Hatred (1), Kayoko Haruyama (1) and Toujyuki Leon (1)
- TLW World Women's Tag Team Championship (1 time) – with Hailey Hatred
- World Yoneyama Championship (1 time)
- Daily Sports Christmas Cup (2006)
- JWP Openweight Championship #1 Contender's Tournament (2010)
- JWP Tag Team Championship #1 Contender's Tournament (2007)
- JWP Tag Team Championship Tournament (2004)
- Natsu Onna Kettei Tournament (2009)
- Natsu Onna Kettei Tag Tournament (2010) – with Command Bolshoi

  - JWP Year-End Award (12 times)
    - Best Bout Award (2010) vs. Yoshiko Tamura on December 23
    - Best Bout Award (2011) vs. Leon on April 3
    - Best Bout Award (2012) with Emi Sakura vs. Arisa Nakajima and Command Bolshoi on August 19
    - Distinguished Service Award (2009)
    - Fighting Spirit Award (2001, 2003–2006)
    - MVP Award (2002, 2010, 2011)
- NEO Japan Ladies Pro-Wrestling

- NEO High Speed Championship (1 time)
- NEO Stage (2005)

- Nikkan Sports
  - Joshi Puroresu Best Tag Team Award (2009) with Emi Sakura
- Oz Academy

- Oz Academy Openweight Championship (1 time)
- Oz Academy Pioneer 3-Way Championship (2 times)
- Oz Academy Tag Team Championship (3 times) – with Hiroyo Matsumoto (1), Tsubasa Kuragaki (1) and Yuu (1)
- Second Triple Crown Champion

- Pure-J

- Pure-J Openweight Championship (1 time)

- Pro Wrestling Illustrated
  - Ranked No. 204 of the top 250 female wrestlers in the PWI Women's 250 in 2024
- Pro Wrestling Wave
  - Wave Tag Team Championship (1 time) – with Cherry
  - Catch the Wave Award (1 time)
    - Technique Award (2022)
- Union Pro Wrestling

- Fly To Everywhere World Championship (1 time)

- World Woman Pro-Wrestling Diana
  - WWWD Queen Elizabeth Championship (2 times)
  - WWWD Tag Team Championship (1 time) – with Kaho Kobayashi
- World Wonder Ring Stardom

- Artist of Stardom Championship (5 times) – with Kairi Hojo and Yuhi (1), Hatsuhinode Kamen and Tsubasa Kuragaki (1), Hiroyo Matsumoto and Jungle Kyona (1), Jungle Kyona and Natsuko Tora (1), and Rina and Konami (1)
- High Speed Championship (2 times)

== Luchas de Apuestas record ==
Winner (wager)	Loser (wager)	Location	Event	Date	Notes
Kaori Yoneyama (championship and hair)	Emi Sakura (hair)	Tokyo, Japan	JWP Revolution	September 19, 2010	
