= Makoto (wrestler) =

Japanese professional wrestler (born 1989)

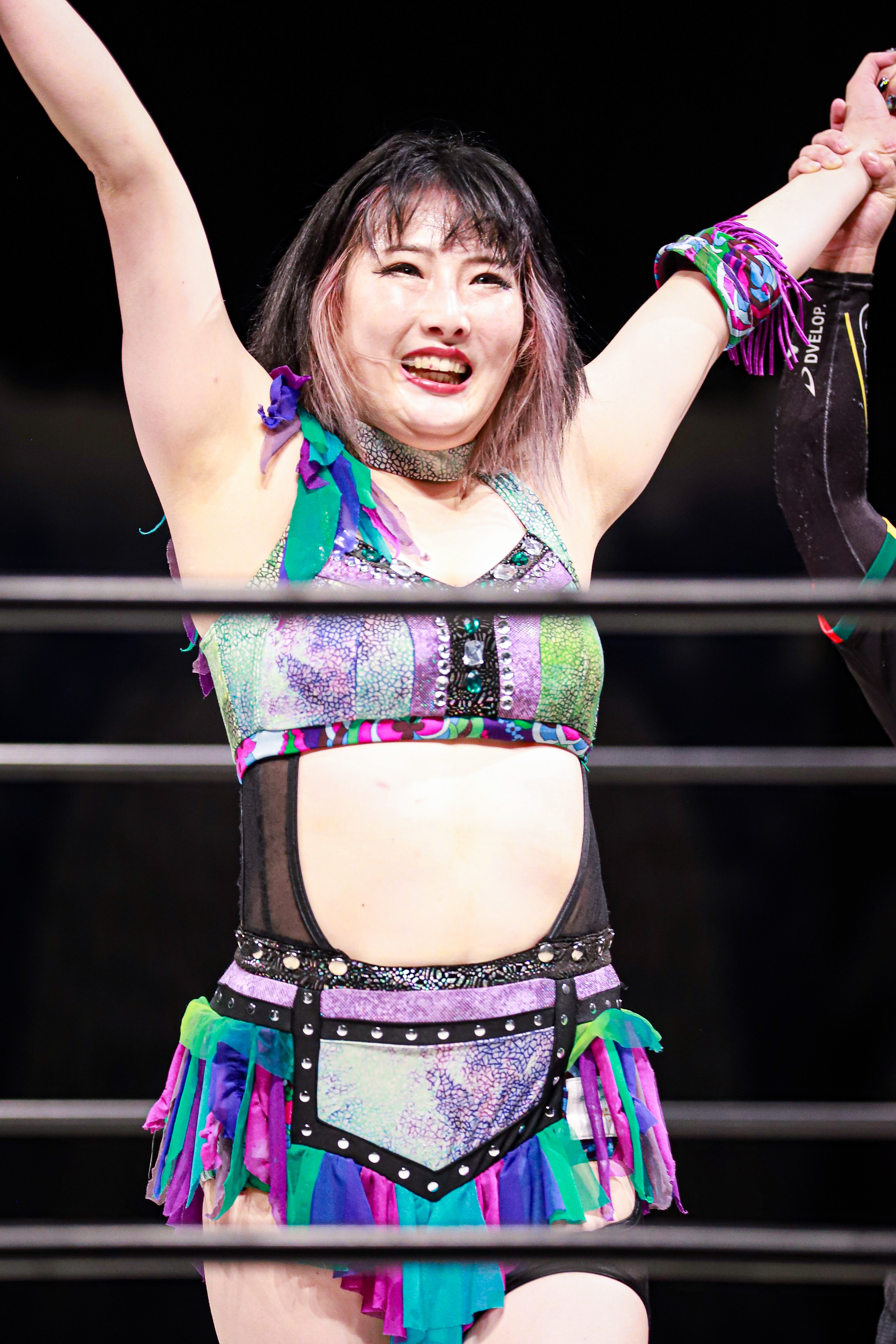
- Makoto in July 2023

Personal information
- Born: September 26, 1989 (age 37) Kobe, Hyōgo, Japan

Professional wrestling career
- Ring name(s): Angela Mako; Kei Murakami; Lady Face; Mako-san; Makoto; Makoto-hime; Ma!ko?to
- Billed height: 1.67 m (5 ft 5 1/2 in)
- Billed weight: 70 kg (154 lb)
- Trained by: Emi Sakura; Yoshihiro Tajiri
- Debut: July 25, 2006

Makoto (真琴, Makoto; born September 26, 1989) is a Japanese professional wrestler. Trained by Emi Sakura, Makoto made her debut for her Ice Ribbon promotion in July 2006. During the next five years, Makoto went on to win Ice Ribbon's top title, the ICE×60 Championship, once and the International Ribbon Tag Team Championship twice, before transferring over to the Smash promotion in August 2011. She remained with Smash until March 2012, when the promotion folded. The following month, Makoto was announced as part of the roster of the new Wrestling New Classic (WNC) promotion. In March 2013, Makoto became the second WNC Women's Champion. In January 2014, Makoto made Reina Joshi Puroresu her second home promotion in addition to WNC. Reina became her primary home promotion after WNC shut down in June 2014. She is a former one-time Reina World Women's Champion and a two-time Reina World Tag Team Champion. She is also known for working at Seadlinnng where she is part of a faction called “Las Fresa De Ego Istas.”

== Professional wrestling career ==
=== Ice Ribbon (2006–2011) ===
In February 2006, Makoto began training under Gatokunyan wrestler Emi Sakura. Two months later Sakura left Gatokunyan to form her own promotion, Ice Ribbon, taking, among others, Makoto with her. Makoto would make her wrestling debut on July 25, 2006, at Ice Ribbon's third ever show, losing to then nine-year-old Riho in a minute. Makoto's early wrestling character was based on her real-life social phobia and growing up as a hikikomori child. As is customary in Japanese professional wrestling, Makoto's first year in the business consisted of short matches and losses. Early on, Makoto also began working regularly for NEO Japan Ladies Pro Wrestling, where she represented the Sakura Ribbon-gun ("Sakura Ribbon Army"). She scored the first win of her career in NEO on February 18, 2007, pinning Tanny Mouse in a fourteen-person tag team match between the Sakura Ribbon-gun and the NEO Machine Guns-gun. She would go on to win her first title on February 1, 2008, when she teamed with her idol Etsuko Mita to defeat Tanny Mouse and Yuki Miyazaki for the International Ribbon Tag Team Championship. They would hold the title for five months, before losing it to the team of Chounko and Masako Takanashi. On December 23, Makoto made it to the finals of a tournament to crown the first ever ICE×60 Champion, before being defeated by Seina. After two unsuccessful title challenges against Kiyoko Ichiki, she would finally win the ICE×60 Championship on August 23, 2009, by defeating Ichiki in their third title match against each other. She would go on to lose the title to Emi Sakura on October 12, 2009.

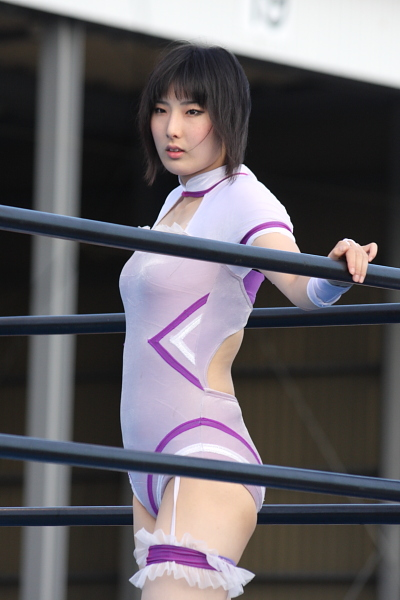
Makoto in July 2010

Makoto's 2009 was highlighted by a feud with her former partner Etsuko Mita, which built to Mita's retirement match on November 1, 2009, where she defeated Makoto. The feud with Mita also led to the evolution of Makoto's character, turning her from a weak and scared comedic character to a more serious competitor. In 2010, Makoto began making appearances for other promotions such as Kaientai Dojo, Osaka Pro Wrestling, Pro Wrestling Zero1 and Smash. On December 26 at Ribbon Mania 2010, Makoto faced Tajiri in a losing effort. In January 2011, Makoto became the leader of a stable named "Heisei YTR" (Young Traditional Revolution), which also included Chii Tomiya, Hikari Minami, Kurumi, Riho and Tsukushi. The group mainly feuded with the "Ichinisanshidan" stable, which included Hikaru Shida, Miyako Matsumoto, Mochi Miyagi, Tsukasa Fujimoto and Mika Iida, who was originally a member of Heisei YTR, but switched sides early on in the rivalry. On February 6, Makoto and Riho made it to the finals of the Ike! Ike! Ima, Ike! Ribbon Tag Tournament, before being defeated by Hikaru Shida and Tsukasa Fujimoto in a match that was also contested for the International Ribbon Tag Team Championship. On March 21, Makoto had another high-profile match against a male wrestler, when she was defeated by Taka Michinoku at Ice Ribbon March 2011. During the first half of 2011, Makoto also made several appearances for Union Pro Wrestling, where she portrayed a tougher villainous character, working under the ring name Makoto-hime ("Princess Makoto") and managing Cao Zhang and Choun Shiryu during their Big China Unified Nakahara Tag Team Championship reign.

Makoto, who had stated that her dream was to make it to WWE, made her American debut on July 30, 2011, when she teamed with Daizee Haze and Sara Del Rey in a losing effort against the trio of Mima Shimoda, Portia Perez and Tsukasa Fujimoto at a Chikara event in Reading, Pennsylvania. The following day, Makoto was defeated by ICE×60 Champion Fujimoto in an "Ice Ribbon Showcase" match at the Asylum Arena in Philadelphia, Pennsylvania. On August 5, it was announced that Makoto would be leaving Ice Ribbon for Smash, where she felt she had a better opportunity to reach her goal of getting to WWE. After the announcement, Makoto went on to unsuccessfully challenge Tsukasa Fujimoto for the ICE×60 Championship on August 7. However, six days later, Makoto and her trainer Emi Sakura defeated the Lovely Butchers (Hamuko Hoshi and Mochi Miyagi) for the International Ribbon Tag Team Championship. On August 21, Makoto was defeated by Sakura in her Ice Ribbon farewell match, after which the International Ribbon Tag Team Championship was vacated.

=== Smash (2010–2012) ===
Makoto made her debut for Yoshihiro Tajiri's Smash promotion on December 24, 2010, at Happening Eve, where she teamed with Isami Kodaka and Yusuke Kodama to defeat Chii Tomiya, Hikari Minami and Kushida in a six-person intergender tag team match, scoring the deciding pinfall over Tomiya. In her next Smash appearance on January 29, 2011, at Smash.13, Makoto was defeated by former WWE wrestler, Serena. After the match, Makoto was attacked by Kana, Io Shirai and Mio Shirai, the trio known as Triple Tails, who had earlier attacked another one of Tajiri's protégés, Yusuke Kodama, after his match. The trio was eventually chased out of the ring by Tajiri. On April 30 at Smash.16, Makoto teamed with Serena and Syuri to defeat the Triple Tails in a six-woman tag team match. On May 3 at Smash.17, Makoto teamed with Tajiri in a three-way intergender tag team ladder match, contested for possession of the new Smash Championship and Smash Diva Championship belts, which had been stolen earlier by Michael Kovac. In the match, Makoto and Tajiri defeated the teams of Kovac and Lin Byron, and Hajime Ohara and Jessica Love to regain possession of the belts, which were then put up for grabs in separate tournaments.

In preparation for the Smash Diva Championship tournament, Makoto, now a member of the Smash Seikigun ("regular army"), began training with the likes of Tajiri and Funaki, the latter of whom taught her a new finishing maneuver, the spear, which he had learned from Edge during his years in the WWE. Makoto entered the Smash Diva Championship tournament on July 15 at Smash.19, defeating fellow Ice Ribbon regular Chii Tomiya with the spear in just four minutes. On August 11 at Smash.20, Emi Sakura accompanied Makoto in a press conference, where she officially signed to become a full-time member of the Smash roster, finalizing her jump from Ice Ribbon. Later that same day, Makoto was eliminated from the Smash Diva Championship tournament in the semifinal stage by Serena. On September 8 at Smash.21, after Kana had defeated Serena to become the inaugural Smash Diva Champion, Makoto, along with Syuri, Ray and Tomoka Nakagawa, entered the ring to challenge the new champion to a title match. The four challengers had a number one contender's match on October 28 at Smash.22, which was won by Nakagawa.

On November 5, Makoto made her debut for All Japan Pro Wrestling in Taiwan, teaming with Bushi and Último Dragón to defeat Cheerleader Melissa, Black Bushi and Dark Dragon in a six-person tag team match. In the buildup to the match Makoto and Melissa brawled at the pre-event press conference. The following day, Makoto was defeated by Melissa in what was billed as the first ever women's wrestling match in Taiwan. On December 25, Makoto made an appearance at Ice Ribbon's RibbonMania 2011 event, taking part in Seina's and Minori Makiba's retirement ceremony after their final match. On December 30 at Smash.24, Makoto wrestled her first hardcore match, when she teamed with Lin Byron in a losing effort against the team of Kana and Smash Diva Champion Tomoka Nakagawa. On February 10, 2012, Smash announced that the promotion would be folding after its March 14 event, after which Makoto would become a free agent. In her final Smash appearance on March 14 at Smash.Final, Makoto teamed with Hisamaru Tajima and Jiro Kuroshio in a six-person tag team match, where they were defeated by Josh O'Brien, Tomoka Nakagawa and Yoshiaki Yago.

=== Wrestling New Classic and Reina (2012–present) ===
On April 5, 2012, Tajiri announced the follow-up promotion to Smash, Wrestling New Classic (WNC), which would hold its first event on April 26, and named Makoto as part of the promotion's roster. Prior to WNC's first event, Makoto made her debut for Pro Wrestling Wave on April 8, appearing as former Gatokunyan training partner Moeka Haruhi's surprise opponent and defeating her in just three minutes. Later that same day, Makoto returned to Union Pro to wrestle her first match as Makoto-hime, a mixed tag team match, where she and Choun Shiryu were defeated by Kengo Ohka and Mio Shirai. On April 26 at WNC's first event, Before the Dawn, Makoto teamed with Syuri in a tag team match, where they were defeated by Kana and Mio Shirai, with Kana pinning Makoto for the win. After the match, Kana verbally assaulted Makoto about her Smash/WNC losing streak, which led to Shirai turning on her and standing up for Makoto. During the following months, Shirai took Makoto under her wing and the two began referring to each other as sisters. Makoto also declared war on Kana, though failing to end her Smash/WNC losing streak in both tag team and singles matches against her. The streak finally ended on June 22, when Makoto scored her first direct pinfall since July 2011, by pinning Kana in a tag team match, where she and Mio Shirai faced Kana and Syuri. On June 23, Makoto wrestled her first singles match against Syuri, losing the match via referee stoppage, after legitimately injuring her left wrist. The injury, later diagnosed as an avulsion fracture, forced Makoto to take a two-month break from in-ring action and cancel her first own independent event, titled Mako Pro, scheduled to take place on July 8.

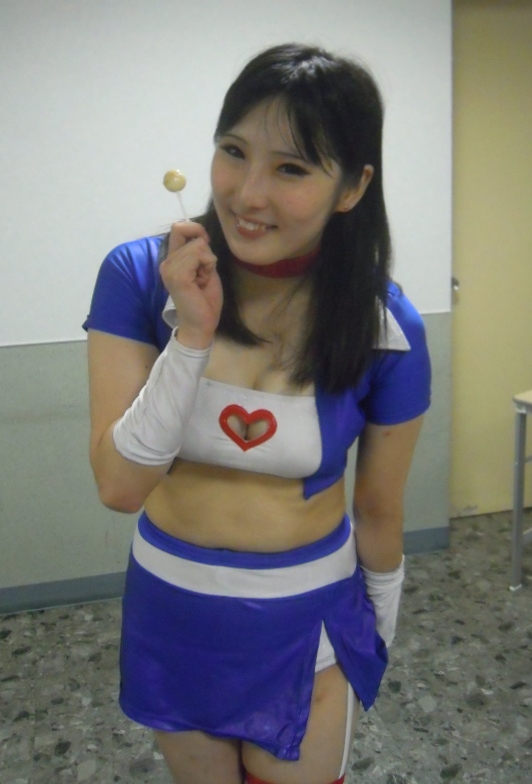
Makoto in August 2013

During her inactivity from the ring, Makoto entered a storyline, where she set out to find out who had defaced a WNC poster with graffiti and attacked one of the promotion's female trainees. The storyline culminated on August 2, when Hajime Ohara turned on WNC and revealed that he and Nagisa Nozaki, who made her WNC debut and first professional wrestling appearance in thirteen months by attacking Makoto, had been the culprits. Makoto made her in-ring return at a WNC event in Korakuen Hall on August 30, losing to Nozaki in a singles match. Makoto was also defeated in two rematches the following two days, losing all matches via referee stoppage due to a sleeper hold. On September 25, Makoto returned to Pro Wrestling Wave, when she and Moeka Haruhi entered the 2012 Dual Shock Wave tournament. Despite their previous problems with each other, the team, known collectively as "1st Impact", opened their tournament with a win over Kurigohan (Ayumi Kurihara and Mika Iida). However, the team went on to lose the following matches against Hikaru Shida and Yumi Ohka, and Shuu Shibutani and Syuri, and were, as a result, eliminated from the tournament. On October 3, Makoto made her debut for World Wonder Ring Stardom, wrestling Mika Iida to a ten-minute time limit draw. On November 9, Makoto and Kana, who share the same birthday, co-produced a "MakoKana Pro" event at Shinjuku Face, celebrating their 23rd and 31st birthday, respectively. Early in the event, the two teamed together in a tag team match, where they defeated the Ice Ribbon team of Hikaru Shida and Hamuko Hoshi. Later, in the semi-main event, Makoto was defeated by veteran wrestler and Oz Academy founder Mayumi Ozaki in a singles match. On November 26, Makoto was defeated by Kana in the first round of the WNC Women's Championship tournament. At the following day's Pro Wrestling Wave event, Makoto and Moeka Haruhi defeated Aya Yuki and Sawako Shimono, Cherry and Shuu Shibutani, Hikaru Shida and Nagisa Nozaki, and Ryo Mizunami and Yuu Yamagata in a five-way tag team match to become the number one contenders to the Wave Tag Team Championship. 1st Impact received their title shot on December 16, but were defeated by the defending champions, Makkurokorosuke (Misaki Ohata and Tsukasa Fujimoto). On December 24, Makoto made an appearance for JWP Joshi Puroresu, taking part in an eleven-woman Santa Cosplay battle royal, which was won by Nana Kawasa. On January 4, 2013, Makoto scored her first win over rival Nagisa Nozaki in a singles grudge match.

On January 25, Makoto main evented her first WNC event, when she teamed with Mitoshichi Shinose and Tajiri in a six-person tag team match, where they defeated Akira, Shinya Ishikawa and Syuri, with Makoto pinning the WNC Women's Champion Syuri for the win. Two days later, Makoto was defeated by Syuri in a non-title singles match. Despite the loss, Makoto announced her intention of going for the WNC Women's Championship and was backed in her quest by Tajiri. In March, Makoto revealed that she had developed a new finishing hold, named Arabesque, which she intended to use to become the new WNC Women's Champion. On March 31, Makoto used the move for the first time to defeat Lin Byron during an afternoon show to become the number one contender to the WNC Women's Championship. During another event later that same day, Makoto used the Arabesque to defeat Syuri to become the new WNC Women's Champion. On April 6, Makoto made her debut for Reina Joshi Puroresu, defeating Jenny Rose in a singles match. On April 14, Makoto returned to JWP to nominate the promotion's president Command Bolshoi as the third and final challenger for her first title defense, a four-way match on April 25. Bolshoi ended up accepting the challenge, but also entered JWP Openweight Champion Arisa Nakajima, JWP Tag Team Champion Kayoko Haruyama and Pro-Wrestling: EVE Champion Nikki Storm to the match, turning it into a seven-way match. On April 25 at WNC's one year anniversary event, Makoto lost the WNC Women's Championship to Lin Byron, ending her reign at just 25 days. On April 29, Makoto returned to World Wonder Ring Stardom to take part in the promotion's big Ryōgoku Cinderella event at Ryōgoku Kokugikan, teaming with Eri Susa, Hikaru Sato and Michael Nakazawa in an eight-person tag team match, where they were defeated by Gota Ihashi, Kota Ibushi, Lin Byron and Mayu Iwatani, after both Makoto and Susa turned on their male tag team partners. Makoto continued working against Command Bolshoi during WNC's events in May, suffering a direct pinfall loss against the JWP president in a six-person tag team match on May 24. Makoto then announced that she was creating herself a masked persona named "Lady Face", inspired by Leatherface, to continue her rivalry with Bolshoi. Makoto made her in-ring debut as Lady Face on June 27, when she was defeated by Bolshoi 666, a darker version of Command Bolshoi. On July 14, Makoto returned to Ice Ribbon for the first time in two years, wrestling another Ice Ribbon original, Aoi Kizuki, to a fifteen-minute time limit draw. Later in the event, after Hikaru Shida had defeated her fellow WNC worker Syuri, Makoto confronted Shida and challenged her to an eight-woman tag team match, where the two would captain two teams of wrestlers between the ages of 24 and 25. On August 3, Makoto entered a three-woman round-robin tournament to determine the new WNC Women's Champion, losing to Serena in her first match. After losing also her second match against Syuri on August 7, Makoto was eliminated from the tournament.

On August 20, Makoto announced that she was starting a new stable, named Shiritsu Puroresu Gakuen ("Private Wrestling School"), revealing the recent debutante Kaho Kobayashi as its first inductee. On August 24, Makoto returned to Reina Joshi Puroresu, when she and Ice Ribbon's Miyako Matsumoto entered a tournament for the vacant Reina World Tag Team Championship, losing to Leon and Rydeen Hagane in their first round match. The following day, Makoto returned to Ice Ribbon and teamed with Aoi Kizuki, Arisa Nakajima and Sawako Shimono in an eight-woman tag team match, where they were defeated by Hikaru Shida, Hanako Nakamori, Misaki Ohata and Syuri. On September 6, Miyako Matsumoto joined Makoto's "wrestling school", becoming the third member of her new stable. The stable then entered a storyline rivalry with male wrestler Takuya Kito, who announced he was also forming a wrestling school. The stable wrestled its first match together on September 18, when they defeated Kito in a three-on-one handicap match. On September 21, Makoto made her debut for the Wrestle-1 promotion, losing to Syuri in a singles match. On September 29, Makoto won a battle royal, which featured all WNC wrestlers, scoring the last pinfall elimination over WNC Champion Tajiri. On October 1, former Stardom wrestler Haruka Kato was announced as the fourth member of Makoto's stable. The storyline rivalry between Makoto's and Takuya Kito's schools concluded on October 31 in a four-on-twelve handicap match, where Makoto, Kato, Matsumoto and Rey Paroma, Makoto's storyline uncle, defeated Kito and his Kuzu Pro school. Post-match, Makoto revealed the newest member of her stable; the returning Mio Shirai, who in turn brought Misaki Ohata with her to also join Shiritsu Puroresu Gakuen. On December 22, Makoto made an appearance for Kaientai Dojo, losing to Bambi, who afterwards agreed to become the newest member of Shiritsu Puroresu Gakuen. On January 5, 2014, Makoto and Bambi defeated Kaji Tomato and Yuki Sato, Kengo Mashimo and Saburo Inematsu and Daigoro Kashiwa and Ricky Fuji in a four-way match to win Kaientai Dojo's WEW Hardcore Tag Team Championship.

On January 9, WNC and Reina Joshi Puroresu held a press conference to announce that, as part of their new working relationship, all of WNC's female wrestlers, Makoto included, were now officially affiliated with both promotions. Ahead of Shiritsu Puroresu Gakuen's self-produced event on January 26, the stable was joined by wrestler and part-time referee Koharu Hinata, ring announcer Chiho Tomiyama and trainee Haruka Yoshimura. At a WNC event on February 27, Makoto and Bambi made their first successful defense of the WEW Hardcore Tag Team Championship against Koharu Hinata and Takuya Kito. On April 13, Makoto returned to Kaientai Dojo for the promotion's twelfth anniversary event, where she and Bambi successfully defended the WEW Hardcore Tag Team Championship in a four-way match. On April 27, Makoto and Shiritsu Puroresu Gakuen won another title, when she and Kaho Kobayashi defeated Aki Shizuku and Ariya in the finals of an eight-team tournament for the vacant Reina World Tag Team Championship. Makoto and Bambi lost the WEW Hardcore Tag Team Championship to Nasu Banderas and Ricky Fuji on May 3. Two days later, Makoto and Kobayashi made their first successful defense of the Reina World Tag Team Championship against the Ice Ribbon team of Shiori Akiba and Yuka. On May 25, they lost the title to Aki Shizuku and Ariya. On June 4, Makoto returned to Ice Ribbon for her first match at the Ice Ribbon dojo in three years, teaming with Kaho Kobayashi in a main event tag team match, where they defeated Risa Sera and Shiori Akiba.

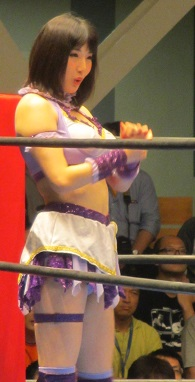
Makoto in August 2015

On June 18, it was announced that WNC would be shutting down following June 26. The promotion's female wrestlers, Makoto included, remained affiliated with Reina Joshi Puroresu. At the first post-WNC Reina event on June 29, Makoto and Kaho Kobayashi unsuccessfully challenged .STAP (Maki Narumiya and Risa Sera) for the International Ribbon Tag Team Championship. On July 31, Makoto celebrated her eighth anniversary as a professional wrestler, working in a main event match, where she and Ray unsuccessfully challenged La Comandante and Yumiko Hotta for the Reina World Tag Team Championship. On August 12, Makoto made her debut for Emi Sakura's Gatoh Move Pro Wrestling promotion, teaming with Riho in a main event tag team match, where they defeated Sakura and "Kotori". On August 20, Makoto and her new partner Aliya defeated La Comandante and Yumiko Hotta to become the new Reina World Tag Team Champions. They made their first successful title defense on August 30 against Cherry and Kaho Kobayashi. On September 30, Makoto unsuccessfully challenged Syuri for the WNC Women's Championship in the title's final match before its retiring. On October 9, Reina's new storyline "consultant" Kana stripped Makoto and Ariya of the Reina World Tag Team Championship. Through Reina's working relationship with the Consejo Mundial de Lucha Libre (CMLL) promotion, Makoto, along with Maki Narumiya, traveled to Mexico for a two-week tour with the promotion. They made their debuts on October 14, teaming with La Comandante in a six-woman tag team match, where they defeated Estrellita, Goya Kong and Princesa Sugehit. On October 19, Makoto won a ten-woman "Mexico vs. Rest of the World" torneo cibernetico, scoring the last elimination over La Amapola, whom she afterwards challenged to a match for her CMLL-Reina International Championship. The title match between the two took place on October 26 and saw Amapola retain. The match also marked the end of Makoto's CMLL tour.

Back in Reina, Makoto entered a rivalry with Lin Byron, after she had turned on Syuri and aligned herself with Kana. This led to a match on December 26, where Makoto was defeated by Byron with help from referee Soft Imai and was, as a result, forced to become the newest member of the villainous Kana-gun stable. Makoto then entered a storyline, where she was trained and remodeled by Kana as a member of Kana-gun, debuting a new look, which included clown makeup, on February 15, 2015. Shortly thereafter, Kana-gun was renamed Piero-gun ("Clown Army"). On February 22, Makoto returned to Gatoh Move, where she picked up her first ever win over her trainer Emi Sakura in the first singles match between the two in three and a half years, after which she challenged Riho to a match for her IWA Triple Crown Championship. On March 7, Makoto teamed up with her Piero-gun stablemate Rina Yamashita to unsuccessfully challenge Hikaru Shida and Syuri for the Reina World Tag Team Championship. On March 26, Makoto unsuccessfully challenged Riho for the IWA Triple Crown Championship. On June 13, Makoto and Yamashita defeated Hikaru Shida and Syuri in a rematch to become the new Reina World Tag Team Champions. They made their first successful title defenses against the Mexican team of Reyna Isis and Silueta on June 23, and Piero-gun stablemates Alex Lee and Cat Power on July 10. On October 9, Makoto and Yamashita lost the title to Silueta and Syuri in their third defense. The following day, Makoto returned to the United States, when she made her debut for Shimmer Women Athletes, losing to Yumi Ohka on Volume 76 and Cheerleader Melissa on Volume 77. The following day, Makoto teamed with Hiroyo Matsumoto in a tag team match at Volume 78, where they were defeated by Ohka and Melissa, before picking up her only win of the weekend over Marti Belle on Volume 79.

On February 21, 2016, Makoto and Hanako Nakamori, billed together as Makafushigi, defeated Kazuki and Rydeen Hagane in the finals to win the 2016 JWP Tag Tournament. As a result, Makoto and Nakamori received a shot at the JWP and Daily Sports Women's Tag Team Championships, but were defeated by the defending champions, Arisa Nakajima and Tsukasa Fujimoto, on March 9. On March 25, Makoto defeated Fujimoto to win the Reina World Women's Championship for the first time. With Maki Narumiya retiring and Syuri leaving the promotion the same day, Makoto was dubbed the new "ace" of Reina. On April 9, Makoto took part in a World of Unpredictable Wrestling (WUW) event in New York City, defeating Jenny Rose to win the vacant WUW Women's Championship. On November 19, Makoto defeated Riho at a Gatoh Move event to win the IWA Triple Crown Championship. On July 1, 2017, Makoto relinquished her three championships, announcing that she was going on an extended hiatus to undergo treatment for a neck injury she had suffered in 2016. Makoto later stated that she had a choice to make between undergoing surgery or being sidelined for two years. On October 25, Makoto made a one-night return to take part in Konatsu's debut match.

== Other media ==
Makoto made her film debut in 2009, appearing in Three Count (スリーカウント, Surī Kaunto) and Heisei Tonpachi Yarou (平成トンパチ野郎～男はツラだよ～), both of which also featured other Ice Ribbon wrestlers. In 2011, Makoto played a small role in the Muscle Girl! (マッスルガール!, Massurugāru!) television drama. Makoto has also released seven gravure DVDs, titled Miracle Hunter (ミラクルハンター, Mirakuru Hantā; 2009), Oriental Doll (オリエンタルドール, Orientaru Dōru; 2012), Oriental Doll II (オリエンタルドールII, Orientaru Dōru II; 2013), Coscchai Mashita...!! (コスッちゃいました・・・!!; 2013), Mako Masshigura (マコまっしぐら; 2015), Favorite Hold (フェイバリットホールド, Feibaritto Hōrudo; 2017), and Venus (2017).

== Personal life ==
Makoto names Etsuko Mita and Trish Stratus as her two biggest idols. She lists cosplay and the video game Shin Sangokumusou as her hobbies. Makoto is also a fan of the Ultimate Fighting Championship (UFC) and attended the UFC 88: Breakthrough pay-per-view live at the Philips Arena in Atlanta, Georgia.

== Championships and accomplishments ==
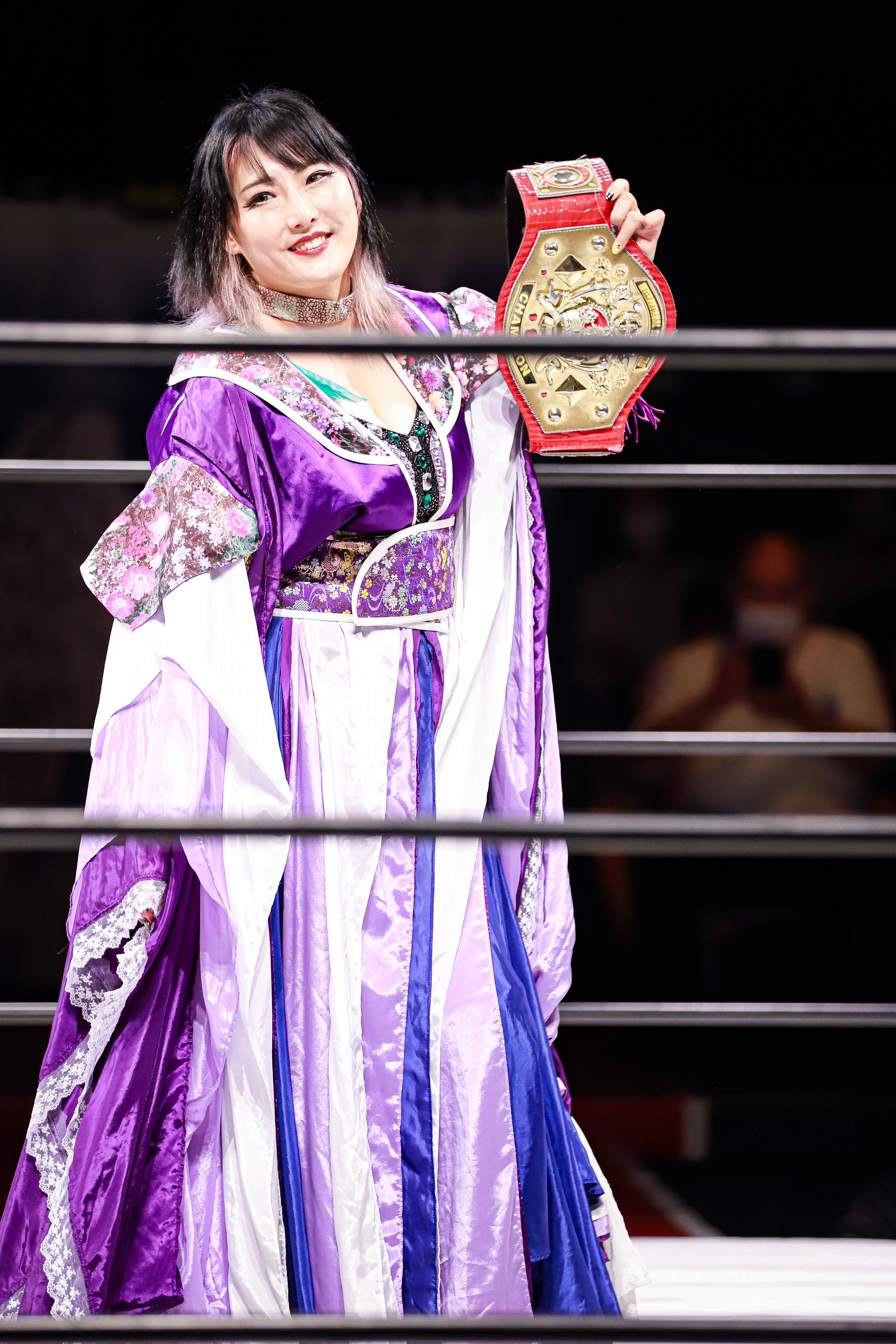
In Ice Ribbon, Makoto is a former International Ribbon Tag Team Champion

- DDT Pro-Wrestling
  - Ironman Heavymetalweight Championship (1 time)
- Gatoh Move Pro Wrestling
  - IWA Triple Crown Championship (1 time)
  - Asia Dream Tag Team Championship (2 times) — with Riho (1) and Sayaka (1)
- Ice Ribbon
  - ICE×60 Championship (1 time)
  - International Ribbon Tag Team Championship (6 times) – with Etsuko Mita (1), Emi Sakura (1), Hamuko Hoshi (3) and Sumika Yanagawa (1)
  - Triangle Ribbon Championship (2 times)
  - Sixth Triple Crown Champion
- JWP Joshi Puroresu / PURE-J
  - Daily Sports Women's Tag Team Championship (1 time) – with Moeka Haruhi
  - JWP Tag Tournament (2016) – with Hanako Nakamori
- Kaientai Dojo
  - WEW Hardcore Tag Team Championship (1 time) – with Bambi
- Nikkan Sports
  - Joshi Puroresu Fighting Spirit Award (2009)
- Pro Wrestling Illustrated
  - Ranked No. 129 of the top 150 female wrestlers in the PWI Women's 150 in 2022
- Puroresu Sano Damashii
  - Sano Damashii Saikyo Tournament (2014)
- Reina Joshi Puroresu
  - Reina World Tag Team Championship (3 times) – with Kaho Kobayashi (1), Ariya (1) and Rina Yamashita (1)
  - Reina World Women's Championship (1 time)
  - New Reina World Tag Team Champion Determination Tournament (2014) – with Kaho Kobayashi
- Seadlinnng
  - Beyond the Sea Single Championship (1 time)
  - Beyond the Sea Tag Team Championship (3 times) – with Asuka (2) and Nagisa Nozaki (1)
- World of Unpredictable Wrestling
  - WUW Women's Championship (1 time)
- Wrestling New Classic
  - WNC Women's Championship (1 time)
- Other Accomplishments
  - Shin BKF Openweight Title Royal Rumble
- Other Championships
  - Shin BKF Openweight Championship (1 time, current)
