= J-J-Jacks =

Professional wrestling tag team

Tag team
- Members: Akira Nogami; Takayuki/Takashi Iizuka
- Name(s): J-J-Jacks
- Billed heights: Nogami: 1.80 m (5 ft 11 in); Iizuka: 1.81 m (5 ft 11 1/2 in)
- Combined billed weight: 197 kg (434 lb)
- Debut: 1993
- Disbanded: 1996

Japanese Jolly Jacks 日本のジョリージャック (Japanese jorījakku), most commonly abbreviated to J-J-Jacks (J · J · JACKS, J J Jakkusu), was a Japanese professional wrestling tag team in New Japan Pro-Wrestling consisting of Akira Nogami and Takayuki/Takashi Iizuka.

== History ==
=== Pre J-J-Jacks (1986–1993) ===
Takayuki Iizuka was Akira Nogami's opponent when Iizuka debuted for New Japan Pro-Wrestling on November 2, 1986. By April 1987, they began teaming up regularly in tag team matches and in multi-man tag team matches, teaming with the likes of Jyushin Thunder Liger, Hiroshi Hase, El Samurai (who both were allied to, since they were all the same age), Riki Choshu, and Tatsumi Fujinami.

=== J-J-Jacks (1993–1996) ===
By March 1993, Iizuka and Nogami named their team Japanese Jolly Jacks, J-J-Jacks for short. Six months later, they began wearing matching ring attire to solidate their team. In October 1993, they took part in the Super Grade Tag League, where they placed seventh place with six points, where they repeat the showing a year later. Although not a major threat to the IWGP Tag Team Championship, J-J-Jacks were reliable in multi-man tag team matches, teaming with the likes of El Samurai, Hiroshi Hase, Manabu Nakanishi, Satoshi Kojima, Tatsumi Fujinami, Osamu Kido, Michiyoshi Ohara, Black Cat, Jyushin Thunder Liger, Power Warrior, Masahiro Chono, Tadao Yasuda, Riki Choshu, Yoshiaki Fujiwara, Keiji Mutoh, Junji Hirata, and Scott Norton. In October 1120, Takayuki Iizuka changed his ring name to Takashi Iizuka, and J-J-Jacks competed in their third Super Grade Tag League, in which they placed sixth with four points. After nearly three years, J-J-Jacks disbanded in 1996, as Nogami joined Heisei Ishingun, while Iizuka formed another tag team with Kazuo Yamazaki.

=== Post J-J-Jacks ===
In 2011, 15 years after J-J-Jacks disbanded, Nogami, now under the name AKIRA, and Iizuka, now the crazy heel in the NJPW stable CHAOS, briefly feuded in SMASH. On June 9, they wrestled each other in the first round of the Smash Championship tournament, in which AKIRA defeated Iizuka by disqualification.

== See also ==
- New Japan Pro-Wrestling
- Puroresu
