= StarBuck =

Finnish professional wrestler

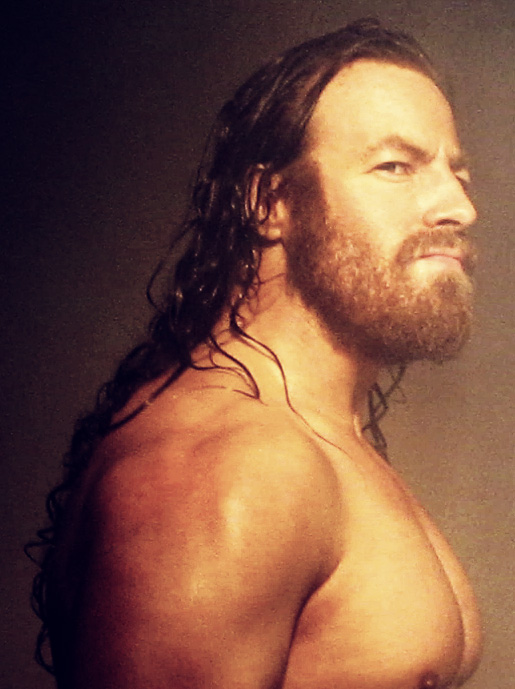
- Majalahti in 2012

Personal information
- Born: April 24, 1973 (age 53) Timmins, Ontario, Canada
- Website: starbuck.fi

Professional wrestling career
- Ring name(s): Michael Wildside; Natural; StarBuck
- Billed height: 1.80 m (5 ft 11 in)
- Billed weight: 102 kg (225 lb)
- Trained by: Lance Storm; Karl Moffat
- Debut: January 7, 1994

Michael Majalahti (born April 24, 1973) is a Canadian-Finnish professional wrestler, singer and artist, better known by the stage name "The Canadian Rebel" StarBuck. His active bands include Stoner Kings, Angel of Sodom and Crossfyre. Majalahti also worked for six years between 2009 – 2015 as a play-by-play commentator for the Finnish broadcasts of WWE programming on Eurosport.

Majalahti headed up Fight Club Finland (FCF) up until 2017, and parted ways with the company in 2018. In the summer of 2018, Majalahti started his own SLAM! Wrestling Finland company. Majalahti has trained talent all across the Nordic countries and has won several championships across Europe. In 2010, Majalahti became a main eventer in Japanese promotion Smash, leading FCF's invasion of the promotion and feuding with the promotion's public face, Tajiri, for the Finnish Heavyweight Championship. He also defeated Tajiri in the finals of a tournament to become the first ever Smash Champion. Afterwards, StarBuck continued working in Tajiri's new Wrestling New Classic (WNC) promotion, winning the promotion's top title, the WNC Championship, in February 2014. He has been called a "pioneer of the new generation of European wrestling" and " the most acclaimed professional wrestler arguably in history out of Northern Europe".

== Early life ==
Majalahti was born to Finnish parents in Timmins, Ontario, Canada on April 24, 1973. Growing up as a fan of professional wrestling, Majalahti moved to Calgary in 1992 to pursue art college, before he started working for local wrestling promotion Rocky Mountain Pro Wrestling as a ring announcer and play-by-play commentator. Majalahti became friends with future WWE wrestlers Edge, Christian, Chris Benoit, Chris Jericho and Lance Storm. Storm, after seeing the potential in him, agreed to become his trainer.

== Professional wrestling career ==
=== Europe ===
Majalahti, adopting the ring name StarBuck, made his professional wrestling debut on January 7, 1994, facing his trainer Lance Storm. In 1996, Majalahti moved to Finland due to Canada's economic recession and quickly made himself a name on the Nordic professional wrestling scene, working and training talent for the first Finnish professional wrestling promotion, Valhalla Pro Wrestling, which went bankrupt in 2004. VPW was followed by Pro Wrestling Finlandia, which was in 2006 replaced by FCF Wrestling (FCF). Throughout his years in the business, Majalahti has wrestled in several countries around the world and won various championships. In July 2018, Majalahti started up his own wrestling company called SLAM! Wrestling Finland.

=== Smash (2010–2012) ===
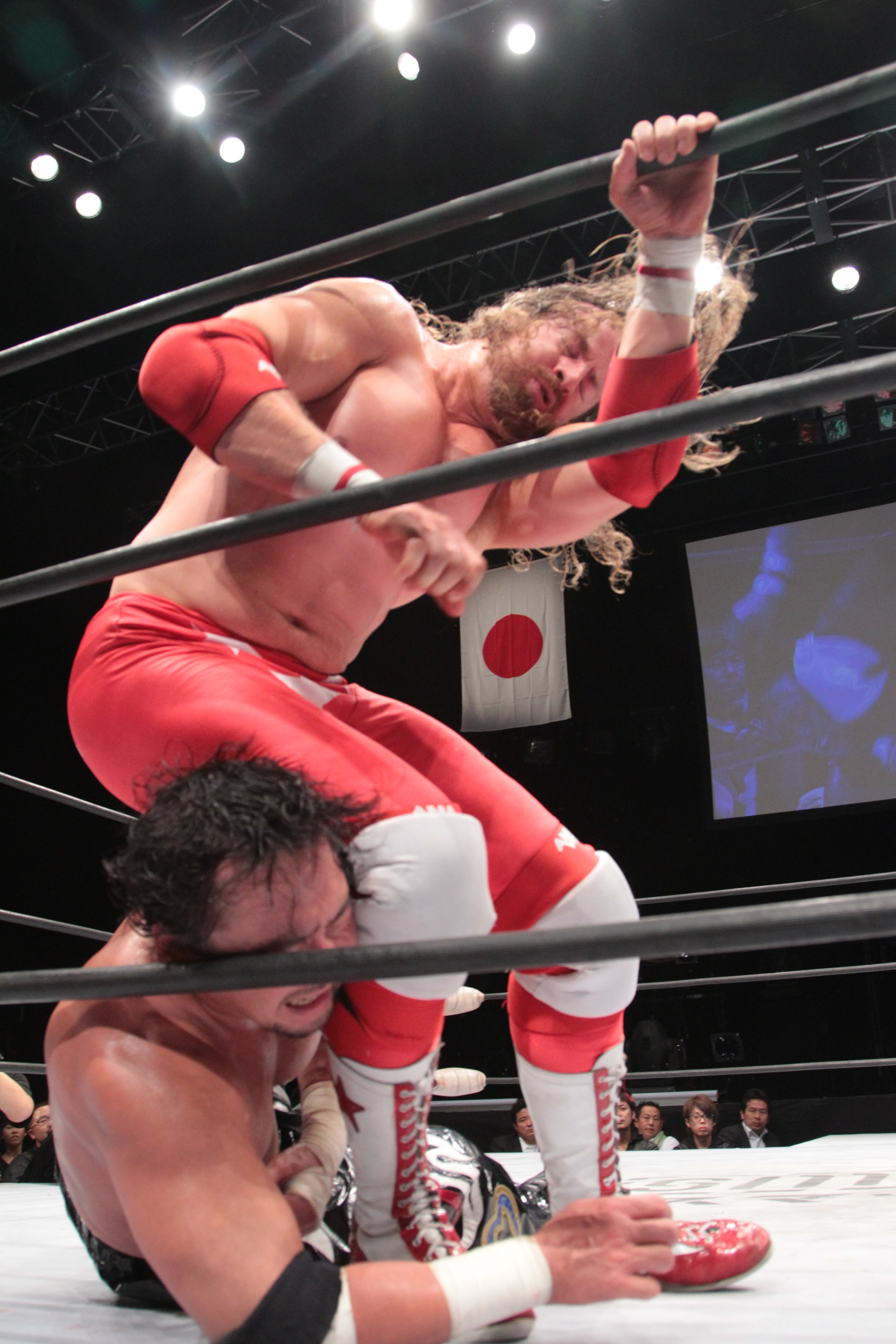
StarBuck vs. Yoshihiro Tajiri in 2010 for SMASH

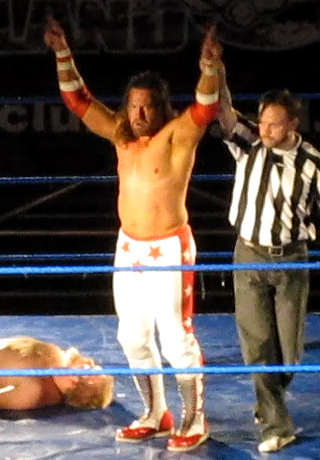
StarBuck in Finland 2012

After Tajiri worked for Fight Club Finland, he asked StarBuck to be part of his new Smash promotion. On May 29, 2010, at Smash.3, he appeared in a video to start an invasion storyline involving wrestlers from FCF. The storyline led to StarBuck becoming an instant main-eventer in Smash. After several more videos and a match, where FCF wrestler Valentine lost the Finnish Heavyweight Championship to Tajiri, StarBuck announced that he was going come to Japan in person to reclaim his promotion's title. StarBuck made his Smash wrestling debut on July 24 at Smash.5, squashing Hajime Ohara, winning the match by pinning him with one finger after a spike piledriver. Later that same day on Smash.6, StarBuck defeated Tajiri in the main event to regain the Finnish Heavyweight Championship, his fourth time winning the title. After the match, Hajime Ohara turned on Tajiri and joined StarBuck's group of FCF wrestlers. After successfully defending the title against Akira on September 24 at Smash.8, StarBuck lost the Finnish Heavyweight Championship back to Tajiri on November 22 at Smash.10, after which he was attacked by the debuting Austrian wrestler Michael Kovac, who announced his intention of taking over Smash. On January 29, 2011, at Smash.12, Kovac defeated StarBuck in a grudge match and used the momentum to capture the Finnish Heavyweight Championship from Tajiri later that same day on Smash.13. Meanwhile, StarBuck went on a win streak, scoring pinfall victories over Super Crazy, Tajiri on two more occasions, Takao Omori, Yoshiaki Yago, Leatherface and Shinya Ishikawa.

After Tajiri agreed to let an FCF representative participate in the tournament to determine the first ever Smash Champion, StarBuck won an eight-man tournament in FCF in July to the second round of the Smash Championship tournament. StarBuck would win the tournament defeating Tajiri in the final to become the first ever Smash Champion. After the match, both competitors were attacked by the returning Michael Kovac, who had previously in the event revealed former WWE wrestler Dave Finlay as his new associate and now revealed that he was coming to Smash for the Smash Championship, before he was chased out of the ring by Hajime Ohara and Akira. On November 23, StarBuck represented Smash in All Japan Pro Wrestling (AJPW), when he teamed with Tajiri and Akira to defeat BUSHI, Keiji Mutoh and Shuji Kondo in a six-man tag team match, pinning BUSHI for the win. The following day at Smash.23, StarBuck lost the Smash Championship to Finlay in his third defense (the first two having taken place in Finland and Norway). On March 14 at Smash.Final, StarBuck competed in Smash's final match, before the promotion closed its doors, where he and Ohara were defeated by Akira and Tajiri.

=== Wrestling New Classic ===
After Smash closed, in 2012 StarBuck became part of the Smash's follow-up promotion Wrestling New Classic (WNC). He joined with Akira and Syuri under the name of "Synapse", feuding with Hajime Ohara. On July 16, StarBuck main evented his first WNC event, defeating Ohara. After several trios victories, StarBuck returned to singles action on August 6, losing to Tajiri in the main event. StarBuck also participated in the WNC Championship tournament, but was defeated in his first round match by Hajime Ohara, following interference from his Kabushiki gaisha DQN stablemates Jiro Kuroshio and Nagisa Nozaki.

StarBuck returned to WNC on March 31, 2013, when he teamed with Akira and Syuri in a six-person tag team main event during an afternoon show, where they were defeated by Ekaterina Bonnie, Emil Sitoci and Ivan Markov. Later that same day, during an evening show, StarBuck defeated Koji Doi in a singles match. After two months away from Japan, StarBuck returned to WNC on May 24 in a six-person tag team main event, where he, Akira and Syuri defeated WNC Champion Osamu Nishimura, WNC Women's Champion Lin Byron and Tajiri. StarBuck then went inactive from in-ring action to rehabilitate two herniated discs in his neck. StarBuck made his next return to WNC on February 27, 2014, when he defeated Tajiri to become the fourth WNC Champion. Post-match, Akira announced that the Synapse stable had decided to disband. StarBuck lost the WNC Championship to Belgian wrestler Bernard VanDamme at Fight Club Finland's Talvisota VIII on March 8.

=== Wrestle-1 ===
After WNC went out of business and its male wrestlers moved over to the Wrestle-1 promotion, StarBuck made his return to Japan on October 10, 2014, working at an Akira produced Wrestle-1 event. In the main event of the show, StarBuck defeated Akira and Masakatsu Funaki in a three-way match.

=== Asuka Project and Tokyo Championship Wrestling ===
After a four-year hiatus, StarBuck returned to ring action in Japan on September 24, 2018, for Asuka Project, a small promotion in Tokyo featuring former WNC wrestlers trained by Tajiri. It was there that StarBuck tagged up with Utamaro against Shinose Mitoshichi and Shota Nakagawa, proving victorious as StarBuck pinned Shinose after his famed jumping spike piledriver. On September 27 at Shinjuku Face Arena in Tokyo, StarBuck and Utamaro lost a tag team match against Yoshihiro Tajiri and Yusuke Kodama when Tajiri pinned Utamaro in the main event of the show for Tokyo Championship Wrestling.

=== SLAM! Wrestling Finland ===
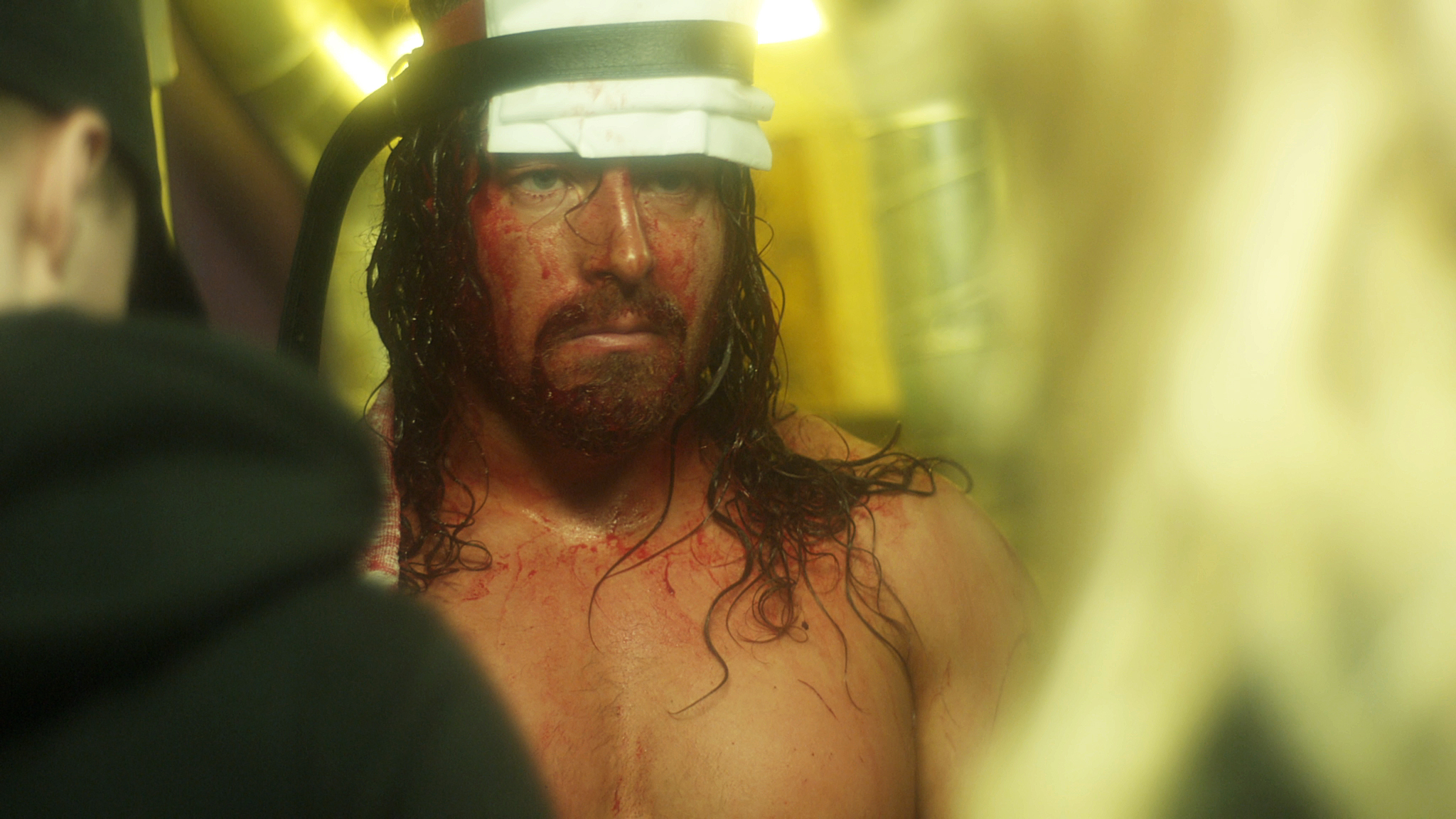
StarBuck at backstage of a Pro Wrestling Event in Helsinki

In the summer of 2018, Majalahti started up SLAM! Wrestling Finland, which became a limited company at the end of 2019, operating and running, as well as selling, events in Finland and Estonia.

== Other endeavors ==
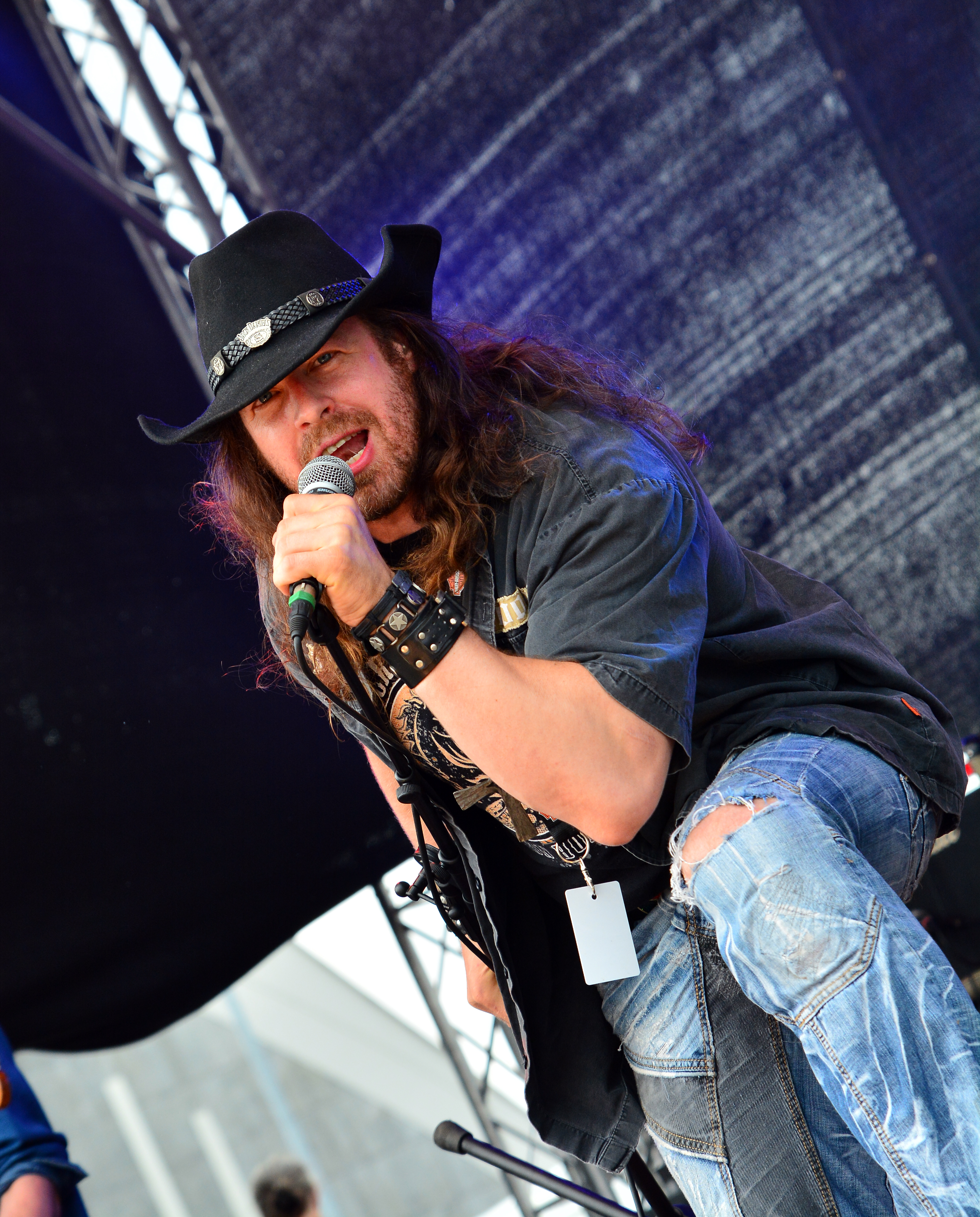
Majalahti performing at Hamburg Harley Days 2015

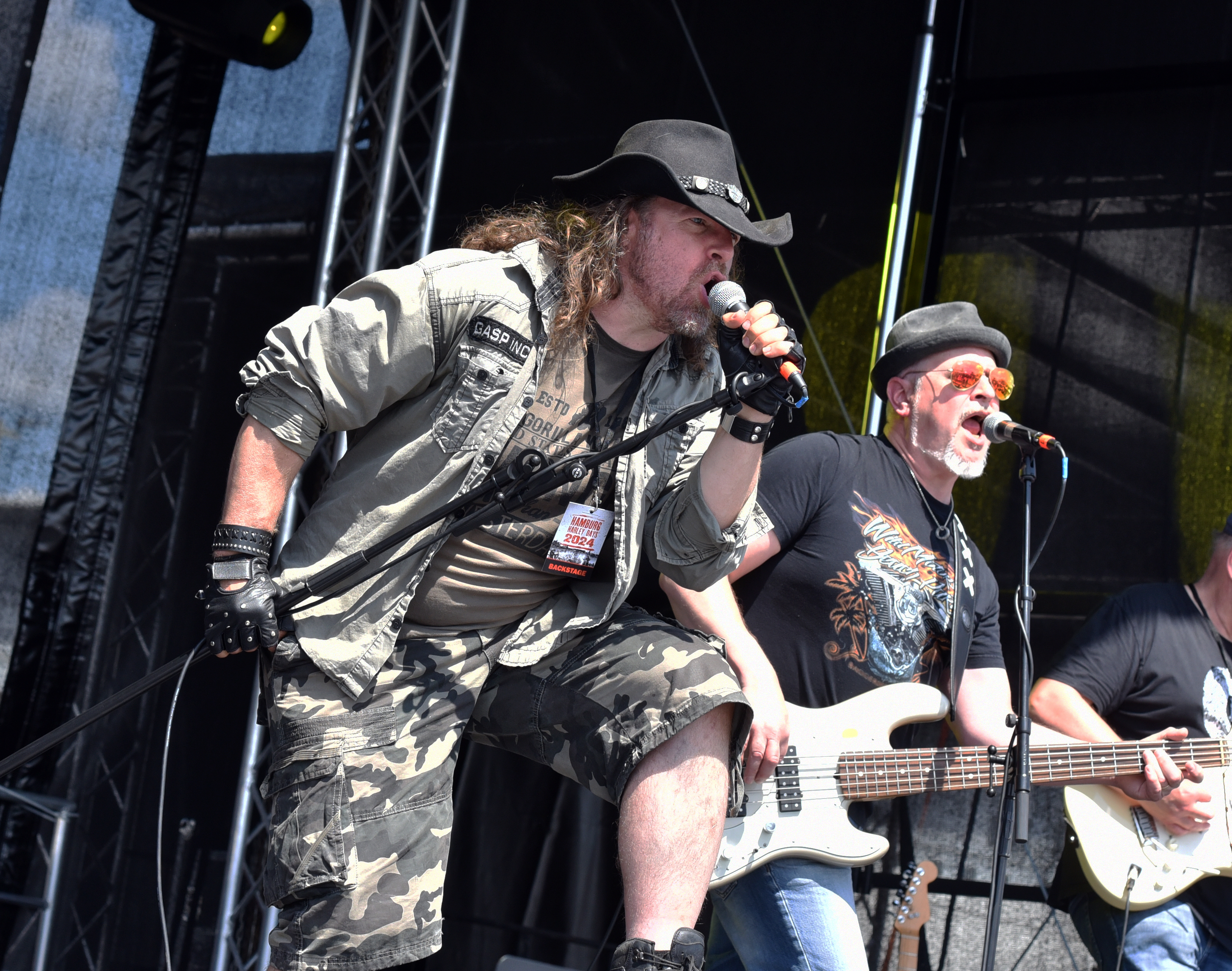
Majalahti performing at Hamburg Harley Days 2024

Majalahti has coached several Finnish rock and metal vocalists and bands in better English, both in regards to lyrics and pronunciation/enunciation. Known acts that Majalahti has worked with in some capacity are Sonata Arctica (Unia album), Stratovarius (Stratovarius album), Lordi (The Arockalypse and The Monsterican Dream albums), Celesty (Vendetta album), The Souls (The Grand Confusion), Widescreen Mode (The Hanging Man album), Godsplague (Evilution and Triumph albums), Thunderstone (Tools of Destruction album), Timo Kotipelto (Coldness and Serenity albums), in addition to others. Majalahti has also created the characters of children's heavy metal band Hevisaurus, and has illustrated the band's album covers.

Majalahti is a licensed FAF gym instructor, serving as a freelance personal trainer and coach in Finland. He also works as a freelance graphic artist and illustrator and has been known to do perform translation work from Finnish to English for several companies, in addition to being one of the most utilized voice-over speakers in Finland in the corporate, B2B and export sector.

In 2014, it was reported that Yle and the Finnish Film Foundation were working on a feature film on Majalahti called Spandex Sapiens, filmed over the past five years. The full-length documentary Spandex Sapiens movie was released throughout Finnish movie theaters on June 17, 2016 and in September of the same year it was featured prominently on YLE television in Finland. The movie won the Audience Favorite Award at the Night Visions Festival in Helsinki as well as the Critic's Choice award at the Helsinki International Documentary Film Festival.

In 2016, news was released that Majalahti was signed to and would be playing a key acting role in Finland's first-ever superhero action movie, Rendel, slated for a September 22, 2017 theater release.

Majalahti's autobiography about his life in professional wrestling was released through Crowbar Press on May 22, 2017, entitled Battleground Valhalla.

In 2017, a movie version of 1980s hit video game It Came From The Desert was released and licensed throughout the world. In the movie, Michael plays the role of The Eradicator, the big idol the main characters in the film.

In 2019, Majalahti and his southern rock band, Crossfyre, released a notable remake cover song and video of professional wrestler "Freebird" Michael Hayes' 1983 song, Badstreet USA. This noted the first time in history that a rock musician/pro wrestler tributed and covered this classic song, which was the first original theme music ever written in the annals of professional wrestling.

=== Discography ===
with Hallowed

- 2000: End of the Age (EP)
- 2002: Fear and Pain (EP)

with Stoner Kings

- 2002: Brimstone Blues
- 2006: Fuck the World
- 2019: Alpha Male
- 2025: Hive Mind

with Klaatuu

- 2008: Altars of Doom (EP)

with Angel of Sodom

- 2015: Divine Retribution

with Crossfyre

- 2010: Southbound
- 2014: Iron Horse
- 2016: No Limits

with Overnight Sensation

- 2013: Life's a Bitch

== Personal life ==
Michael Majalahti was married to a Romanian girl, Diana (born April 27, 1987). She has worked for FCF as his valet, under the name of Miss D, between February 2013 and February 2014. Majalahti proposed to Diana in the wrestling ring in Lohja, Finland on January 4, 2013. Their engagement made headlines in the Romanian media.

The couple divorced in May 2020 and do not have any children together.

At the moment Michael Majalahti is engaged to Susanna Sihlman and the couple will have their big wedding on the 9th of September 2023, in Finland.

== Championships and accomplishments ==
- British Wrestling Alliance
  - BWA World Catchweight Championship (1 time)
- Deutsch Wrestling Allianz
  - DWA World Heavyweight Championship (1 time)
- EuroStars
  - EuroStars European Heavyweight Championship (2 times)
  - FCF Finnish Heavyweight Championship (5 times)
- I Mitti Del Wrestling
  - I Mitti Del Wrestling UE Championship (1 time)
- Italian Wrestling Superstars
  - IWS Heavyweight Championship (1 time)
  - IWS Intercontinental Championship (1 time)
- Slam Wrestling Finland
  - Slam Wrestling Championship (1 time, current)
- Pro Wrestling Finlandia
  - Finnish Heavyweight Championship (1 time)
- Smash
  - Smash Championship (1 time)
  - Smash Championship Tournament (2011)
- STHLM Wrestling
  - Valhalla Nordic Wrestling Championship (1 time)
- TopCatch
  - TopCatch Europameisterschaft Championship (1 time)
- Wrestling New Classic
  - WNC Championship (2 times)
