= Wrestling New Classic =

Japanese professional wrestling promotion

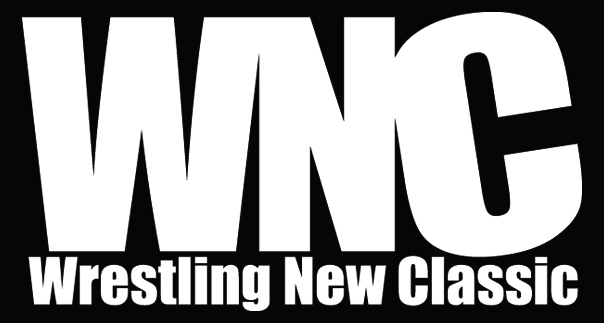
- Acronym: WNC
- Founded: April 5, 2012
- Defunct: June 26, 2014
- Style: Puroresu; Strong style
- Headquarters: Roppongi, Minato, Tokyo
- Founder(s): Tajiri; Akira; Kana
- Sister: Reina Joshi Puroresu
- Merged with: Wrestle-1
- Predecessor: Smash

Wrestling New Classic (WNC) (レスリング・ニュー・クラシック, Resuringu Nyū Kurashikku) was a Japanese puroresu or professional wrestling promotion, founded in April 2012 by Yoshihiro Tajiri. WNC was the follow-up promotion to Smash, which folded in March 2012.

== History ==
On April 5, 2012, Tajiri held a press conference to announce the forming of Wrestling New Classic, which would hold its first two events on April 26 at Shinjuku Face and on May 24 at Korakuen Hall. The promotion's new financial backer at the time was Tsutomu Takashima, the executive director of real estate company Avance Avant Corporation. WNC continued Smash's working relationship with Finnish professional wrestling promotion Fight Club Finland. Unlike Smash, which held, on average, one event per month, WNC had a more regular schedule, producing three events in its official opening month, May 2012. The promotion is named after a comment made by final Smash Champion Dave Finlay, who, at the promotion's penultimate event, told Tajiri to "keep wrestling classic" with his new promotion. Several WNC wrestlers also booked and promoted their own events in collaboration with the promotion, including Kana's Kana Pro, Makoto's Mako Pro, Syuri's Stimulus, and Takuya Kito's Kuzu Pro.

In late 2013, WNC also established a working relationship with joshi puroresu promotion Reina Joshi Puroresu, as part of which all of WNC's female wrestlers became officially affiliated with both promotions in January 2014. On June 18, 2014, Tajiri held a press conference with Keiji Mutoh, where he announced that WNC would be going inactive following June 26. Afterwards, all female WNC wrestlers remained affiliated with WNC-Reina, while six male wrestlers, Tajiri and Akira included, transferred over to Mutoh's Wrestle-1 promotion. WNC held its final event on June 26, 2014, in Tokyo's Shinjuku Face.

== Final roster ==
=== Wrestlers ===
| Ring name | Real name | Notes |
|---|---|---|
| Akira | Akira Nogami | |
| Haruka Kato | Haruka Kato | WNC-Reina |
| Jiro Kuroshio | Soujiro Higuchi | |
| Koji Doi | Koji Doi | |
| Makoto | Unknown | WNC-Reina |
| Rionne Fujiwara | Rionne McAvoy | |
| Tajiri | Yoshihiro Tajiri | |
| Yusuke Kodama | Yusuke Kodama | |
| Masaya Takahashi | Masaya Takahashi | |
| Syuri | Syuri Kondo | WNC-Reina |
| Takuya Kito | Yuji Kito | |

=== Staff ===
| Name | Notes |
|---|---|
| Chiho Tomiyama | Ring announcer |
| High Step Shota | Referee |
| Katsumi Tamagawa | Referee |
| Serena Higa | Ring announcer |
| Soft Imai (Daisuke Imai) | Referee |
| Yula | Ring announcer |

== Alumni ==
| Ring name | Real name | Notes |
|---|---|---|
| Hajime Ohara | Hajime Ohara | Resigned January 31, 2013 |
| Haruka Yoshimura | Haruka Yoshimura | Retired February 28, 2014 |
| Hiroki Murase | Hiroki Murase | Resigned January 11, 2014 |
| Horizon | Yoshihiro Horaguchi | Signed with Kaientai Dojo on September 14, 2014 |
| Josh O'Brien | Josh O'Brien | Resigned January 31, 2013 |
| Kaho Kobayashi | Kaho Kobayashi | Resigned on September 16, 2014, to sign with Asuka Project and Pro Wrestling Wave |
| Kana | Kanako Urai | Resigned November 28, 2012 |
| Koharu Hinata | Koharu Hinata | Resigned June 18, 2014 |
| Lin Byron | Unknown | Resigned June 26, 2014 |
| Mitoshichi Shinose | Akira Shinose | Resigned January 30, 2014 |
| Nagisa Nozaki | Nagisa Nozaki | Went inactive on January 25, 2013 |

=== Notable guests ===
- Adam Angel / Backpacker Joe
- Arisa Nakajima
- Atsushi Kotoge
- The Bodyguard
- Brahman Kei
- Brahman Shu
- Carlito
- Command Bolshoi
- Daisuke Sekimoto
- Dave Finlay
- Dump Matsumoto
- El Samurai
- Emil Sitoci
- Gedo
- Gran Hamada
- Jado
- Kaoru
- Kyoko Kimura
- Masato Tanaka
- Osamu Nishimura
- Maybach Taniguchi
- Mikey Whipwreck
- Mio Shirai
- Misaki Ohata
- Miyako Matsumoto
- Naomichi Marufuji
- Ray Mendoza Jr.
- Ricky Marvin
- Riho
- Serena
- StarBuck
- Super Crazy
- Tadasuke
- Taiji Ishimori
- Takeshi Morishima
- Tatsumi Fujinami
- Tommy Dreamer
- Tomoka Nakagawa
- Toru Yano
- Último Dragón
- Zeus

== Championships ==
| Championship | Final champion(s) | Date won | Defeated |
|---|---|---|---|
| WNC Championship | Yuji Kito | March 24, 2018 | Retired |
| WNC Women's Championship | Syuri | September 18, 2013 | Serena |

== Annual tournaments ==
| Tournament | Last winner | Last held |
|---|---|---|
| Dave Finlay Cup | Hiro Tonai | January 4, 2014 |

== See also ==
- Professional wrestling in Japan
