= Osamu Nishimura =

Japanese professional wrestler (1971–2025)

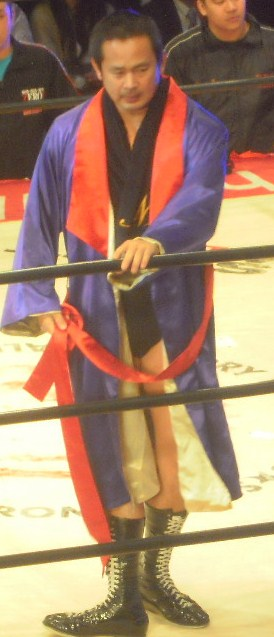
- Nishimura in 2012

Personal information
- Born: September 23, 1971 Tokyo, Japan
- Died: February 28, 2025 (aged 53)

Professional wrestling career
- Ring name(s): Osamu Nishimura; Nishimu Lama
- Billed height: 1.85 m (6 ft 1 in)
- Billed weight: 105 kg (231 lb)
- Trained by: NJPW Dojo; B. Brian Blair; Hiro Matsuda; Don Jardine; Tatsumi Fujinami; Karl Gotch; Dory Funk, Jr. Tony St. Clair
- Debut: April 21, 1991
- Retired: December 8, 2024

Osamu Nishimura (西村修, Nishimura Osamu; September 23, 1971 – February 28, 2025) was a Japanese professional wrestler. Nishimura was best known for his time in New Japan Pro-Wrestling (NJPW) and MUGA World Pro Wrestling (MUGA). Outside of pro wrestling, he was also a politician, having served as a member of the Tokyo Bunkyo Ward Assembly as a food education instructor.

== Professional wrestling career ==
=== Early years (1991–1994) ===
Nishimura joined the New Japan Pro Wrestling dojo in April 1990, while a senior in high school. After a year of training, he debuted for NJPW in April 1991, losing to Takayuki Iizuka. In August 1993, he went overseas to Florida for an extensive training excursion under B. Brian Blair, Hiro Matsuda and Don Jardine. In March 1994, he wrestled a match for Yoshiaki Yatsu's Social Pro Wrestling Federation, before returning to the States to start his overseas excursion.

=== Overseas excursions (1994–1995, 1997, 2001–2019) ===
In April 1994, he embarked on his first overseas tour of the United States, wrestling for various National Wrestling Alliance territories. On August 26, 1994, he went to the Global Wrestling Federation and defeated Alex Porteau to win the GWF Light Heavyweight Championship; he would be its final champion before the promotion folded a month later. A day later, he went to the NWA's biggest territory at the time, Eastern Championship Wrestling, and take part in the NWA World Title Tournament to crown a new NWA World Heavyweight Champion; he lost to Dean Malenko in the first round. The next day, he unsuccessfully challenged Shane Douglas for the ECW World Heavyweight Championship. He would be brought back to NJPW for one match in October 1994, before Nishimura returned to the States to resume his excursion. In November 1994, he would receive another chance at the NWA World Heavyweight Championship with another tournament, this time co-promoted by Smoky Mountain Wrestling; he and Lou Perez went to a time limit draw in the first round, eliminating both men. In March 1995, he had a couple shots at the NWA World Heavyweight Championship, now held by Dan Severn, but lost both times. In May 1995, he moved to the Netherlands to train in Chris Dolman's dojo for a month, before moving to the United Kingdom to train in The Snake Pit under Roy Wood. It was in the Snake Pit, where Tatsumi Fujinami saw Nishimura's progress and was so impressed that Nishimura was to return to NJPW, after the NJPW vs. UWFi show.

In May 1997, he underwent another overseas excursion. First, he went to Canada to train under Tokyo Joe Daigo for a month, before going to Europe for Catch Wrestling Association. In September 1997, he defeated Robbie Brookside to win the CWA Submission Shootfighting Championship. He would vacate the title in January 1998, due to his return to NJPW.

In 2001, he went to the United States again to polish his skills at the Funking Conservatory in Florida, under the eye of Dory Funk, Jr. (whom Nishimura admired from watching matches of New Japan's founder Antonio Inoki). He would wrestle on and off with them until 2019. In May 2002, he wrestled a couple of matches for Consejo Mundial de Lucha Libre in Mexico. In June 2003, he wrestled for another Florida promotion, Independent Pro Wrestling, before moving to Germany three months later to wrestle for European Wrestling Promotion. In February 2006, he and old MUGA comrade Katsushi Takemura took part in Chikara's 2006 Tag World Grand Prix, where they made it to the semi-finals, before being defeated by Milano Collection A. T. and Skayde. In December 2006, he wrestled a show for Full Impact Pro. In June 2007, he wrestled a show for NWA Bluegrass, taking part in another tournament for the NWA World Heavyweight Championship, but lost to Brent Albright in the first round. In May 2008, he wrestled in South Korea for New Korea Pro Wrestling Association, winning the NKPWA World Heavyweight Championship for the first time, defeating Riki Bassan and Kurt Angle in a three-way match. He would lose the title in March 2009 to Yun Kang Chul. In May 2017, he returned to Florida and won the BANG! TV World Heavyweight Championship. In September 2017, Nishmura regained the NKPWA World Heavyweight Championship for the second time. He would hold onto the title for nearly a year, before losing it back to Yun Kang Chul. He would regain the title nearly a year later for a third time.

=== New Japan Pro-Wrestling (1995–2006) ===
Nishimura returned to New Japan in October 1995. He was immediately paired with Keiji Muto for the annual Super Grade Tag League; they tied for third with the team of Shiro Koshinaka and Tatsutoshi Goto. In November 1995, he lost a high-profile match to Ric Flair. In October 1996, he won the Catch of Lancashire tournament.

After a European excursion, Nishimura returned in January 1998 and teamed with Shinya Hashimoto in the struggle against NWO Japan's Keiji Mutoh and Masahiro Chono, who held the IWGP Tag Team Championship, but they were unsuccessful. Nishimura also failed to unseat IWGP Heavyweight Champion Kensuke Sasaki, before Nishimura was diagnosed with a cancerous retroperitoneal tumor in August. He made his triumphant return in June 2000, despite losing to Tatsumi Fujinami on his first match back. Nishimura's star was bright enough to warrant an earnest push, and he won the IWGP tag team titles with Fujinami. Nonetheless, the bi-promotional duo of Mutoh and All Japan Pro Wrestling's Taiyō Kea were on the rise, and the two teams clashed over both the IWGP title and AJPW's World Tag Team Championship, both of which ended up around the waists of Mutoh and Kea.

In 2002 he teamed with Manabu Nakanishi under the name Gotch-ism, but they failed to win the titles. As Nakanishi began teaming more with Yutaka Yoshie, Nishimura engaged in a feud with the returning Minoru Suzuki, with whom he had a MUGA-style feud that showcased the traditional, scientific skills of both wrestlers. He later began teaming with Hiroyoshi Tenzan, with whom he won another IWGP tag team title in late 2003. They held the belts until February 2004 when they were defeated by Suzuki and Yoshihiro Takayama. As Tenzan focused on the IWGP Heavyweight title, Nishimura aimlessly was relegated to the mid-card. In January 2006, Nishimura opted not to renew his NJPW contract and left the company altogether.

=== All Japan Pro Wrestling (2007–2024) ===
On October 20, 2007, Nishimura announced that he and trainee Manabu Soya have signed with All Japan Pro Wrestling (AJPW) as full-time wrestlers, citing unhappiness with the erratic MUGA World scheduling. From November 23 to December 9, 2007, Nishimura teamed with Masanobu Fuchi to compete in the World's Strongest Tag Determination League, finishing the league with 7 points (2 wins, 2 losses and 3 draws) and placing 5th overall. In November 2007, Nishimura announced plans to form a tag team with Dory Funk, Jr. in 2008, along with claiming that All Japan was planning a retirement ceremony for Funk. His final match for AJPW took place on March 9, 2024, teaming with Takao Omori, defeating Seigo Tachibana and Yuma Aoyagi.

=== Wrestling New Classic (2013) ===
On March 31, 2013, Nishimura made his debut for Wrestling New Classic (WNC), defeating Zeus to become the number one contender to the WNC Championship. On April 25, he defeated Akira to become the second WNC Champion. A month later, Nishimura joined Akira's villainous Synapse stable. On August 8, Nishimura lost the WNC Championship to Tajiri in his first defense.

=== Frontier Martial-Arts Wrestling Explosion (2022–2024) ===
In 2022, Nishimura began working with Frontier Martial-Arts Wrestling Explosion. His first match was on December 11, teaming up with Katsushi Takemura and Yutaka Yoshie in a loss to the team of Atsushi Onita, Koji Nakagawa and Raijin Yaguchi in a Current Blast Spider Net & Barbed Wire Barricade Mine Explosion & Current Blast Explosion Bat & Barbed Wire Inside Board Explosion Deathmatch, Nishimura's first-ever deathmatch in his career. He wouldn't return to the company until August 2024, as his mentor, Dory Funk, Jr. wanted him as his partner for his final match on his final trip to Japan. To take part in this match, Nishimura had to get a waiver from the hospital and have five doctors, nurses and trainers at ringside to monitor his health, due to having stage-four esophageal cancer. On August 24 at Kawasaki Stadium, he and Funk defeated Atsushi Onita and Raijin Yaguchi in a Double Hell Current Blast Deathmatch, as Nishimura used Funk's spinning toehold to force Yaguchi to submit, a fitting tribute to his 83-year-old mentor and his late brother, Terry Funk. His final match of his career took place on December 8, as he teamed up with Katsushi Takemura and Shinya Aoki in a loss to Atsushi Onita, Raijin Yaguchi and Mammoth Sasaki in a No Ropes Barbed Wire & Giant Electric Explosive Bat Deathmatch.

== Outside of pro wrestling ==
=== Acting ===
In 2004, Nishimura starred in the film The Calamari Wrestler. His character, Kanichi Iwata, like Nishimura, had cancer and used natural remedies to combat the illness.

=== Politics ===
In March 2010, Nishimura announced that he was taking a hiatus from professional wrestling and announced his candidacy for the House of Councillors, but lost his bid in July 2010. In January 2011, he announced his candidacy for the Tokyo Bunkyo Ward Assembly, representing the People's New Party. A month later, he announced that he would cancel his contract with AJPW and concentrate on political activities. In April 2011, he was elected as a member of the Tokyo Bunkyo Ward Assembly. In May 2012, Nishimura changed his political party to Independent, due to the collapse of the People's New Party. In April 2015, he was re-elected for a second term. In April 2019, he was re-elected to a third term. In April 2023, he was re-elected to a fourth term, which he served until his death in 2025. His last message on social media, posted on February 16, he wrote, "It's been a painful week for me to not know if I'm alive or dead. I can't go down any more, so I just have to go up. If you give up, it's over, and I'll be back in Congress in a few days."

=== Illness ===
In August 1998, after the G1 Climax, Nishimura was diagnosed with a cancerous tumor in his retroperitoneal space. He spent nearly two years fighting by using natural remedies such as natural diet, medicinal food, Chinese medicine, Ayurvada, sea bathing, and urine therapy, instead of chemotherapy, until he was declared cancer-free in 2000. His cancer scare inspired his political career as a food education instructor, as his top priority was how to make the world healthier and how to direct it to preventive medicine.

== Death ==
In March 2024, Nishimura was diagnosed with stage-four esophageal cancer. The cancer had already spread to the lymph nodes outside the esophagus and the entire upper left side of his body, except his head. Unlike his first cancer scare, he had to undergo chemotherapy. In July 2024, he was in a coma due to the cancer metastasizing to the brain, but was able to recover. In October 2024, Nishimura underwent a craniotomy to remove a four-centimeter-sized cancer that had spread to his brain. In January 2025, Nishimura missed two shows he was scheduled to wrestle and by the end of the month, he was hospitalized again, this time due to the side effects of anti-cancer medication, worsened by the metastasizing of his brain tumor. On February 28, 2025, it was announced by Shinsuke Nakamura that Nishimura had died at the age of 53.

== Championships and accomplishments ==
- Catch Wrestling Association
  - CWA Submission Shootfighting Championship (1 time, inaugural)
- Funking Conservatory
  - !Bang! TV World Heavyweight Championship (1 time)
  - FC United States Heavyweight Championship (1 time)
  - Funking Conservatory Tag Team Championship (1 time) – with Adam Windsor
- Global Wrestling Federation
  - GWF Light Heavyweight Championship (1 time)
- Independent Wrestling World
  - IWW One Night Tournament (1998)
- New Japan Pro-Wrestling
  - IWGP Tag Team Championship (2 times) – with Tatsumi Fujinami (1) and Hiroyoshi Tenzan (1)
  - The Catch of Lancashire Tournament (1996)
  - G1 Tag League (2003) – with Hiroyoshi Tenzan
  - Triathlon Survivor (2002) – with Manabu Nakanishi & Yutaka Yoshie
  - Tag Team Best Bout (2002) with Manabu Nakanishi vs. Hiroyoshi Tenzan and Masahiro Chono on June 5
  - Technique Award (2001, 2002, 2003)
- Nikkan Sports
  - Technique Award (2001, 2002, 2003)
- New Korea Pro-Wrestling Association
  - NKPWA World Heavyweight Championship (3 times)
- Pro Wrestling Illustrated
  - PWI ranked him No. 213 of the top 500 singles wrestlers in the PWI 500 in 2010
- Wrestling New Classic
  - WNC Championship (1 time)
