= WNC Championship =

Professional wrestling championship in Wrestling News Classic

- The WNC Championship belt (October 2012 — June 2014)

Details
- Promotion: Wrestling New Classic; Asuka Pro Wrestling
- Date established: September 28, 2012
- Date retired: June 26, 2014
Statistics
- First champion: Akira
- Final champion: Bernard VanDamme
- Longest reign: Tajiri (203 days)
- Shortest reign: StarBuck (9 days)
- Oldest champion: Akira (46 years, 289 days)
- Youngest champion: Osamu Nishimura (41 years, 214 days)
- Heaviest champion: Bernard VanDamme (120 kg (260 lb))
- Lightest champion: Tajiri (85 kg (187 lb))

The WNC Championship was a professional wrestling championship owned by the Wrestling New Classic (WNC) promotion. The title was a spiritual successor to the Smash Championship, the top title of WNC's predecessor, Smash. The championship was first announced at a press conference on September 28, 2012, when it was announced that a single-elimination tournament to determine the inaugural champion would take place from October 26 to December 27. In storyline, the championship belt was donated to WNC by the final Smash Champion Dave Finlay, who was also named the head of the WNC Championship Committee, which decides matches for the title.

Like most professional wrestling championships, the title is won as a result of a scripted match. There were five reigns shared among five wrestlers.

== History ==
=== Championship tournament ===
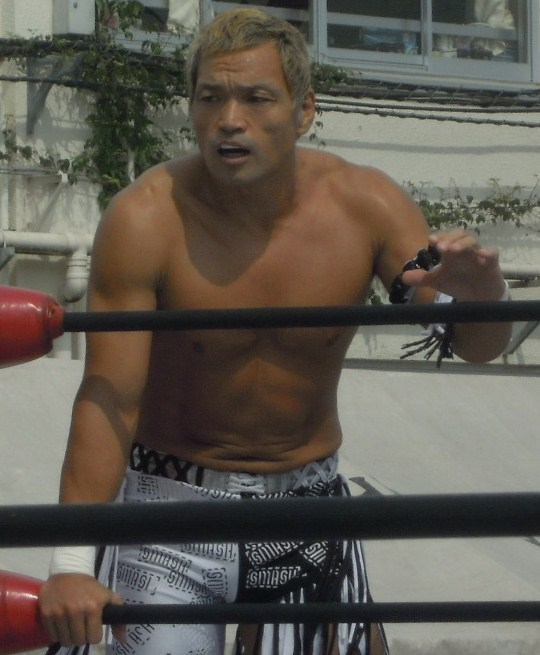
Akira, the inaugural WNC Champion.

On September 28, 2012, Tajiri, the founder of Wrestling New Classic (WNC), announced the creation of the WNC Championship, with an eight-man single-elimination tournament starting on October 26 in Korakuen Hall. The eight participants were announced as Tajiri, Akira, Hajime Ohara, StarBuck, Carlito, Tommy Dreamer and two unnamed participants labeled only as "1st Future" and "2nd Future". On October 3, Tajiri and WNC president Tsutomu Takashima decided the first round matchups via random draw. Three days later, another random draw picked Yusuke Kodama and Adam Angel out of a group of six younger WNC wrestlers to take the "Future" spots in the tournament. The first three first round matches took place on October 26 and saw Akira defeat Adam Angel, Hajime Ohara defeat the inaugural Smash Champion StarBuck and Tajiri defeat Carlito. The final first round match took place on November 26 and saw Tommy Dreamer defeat Yusuke Kodama to advance. In the semifinals two days later, Akira defeated Tommy Dreamer, while Tajiri defeated Hajime Ohara, setting up a final match between the two veterans. On December 27, Akira defeated Tajiri to become the inaugural WNC Champion.

First round (October 26; November 26)
Tajiri | Pin
Carlito | 18:20
Hajime Ohara | Pin
StarBuck | 11:29
Tommy Dreamer | Pin
Yusuke Kodama | N/A
Akira | Pin
Adam Angel | 14:52

Semifinals (November 28)
Tajiri | Pin
Hajime Ohara | 13:17
Tommy Dreamer | Pin
Akira | 21:02

Finals (December 27)
Tajiri | Pin
Akira | 23:45

== Title history ==
Key
| No. | Overall reign number |
| Reign | Reign number for the specific champion |
| Days | Number of days held |
| Defenses | Number of successful defenses |

| No. | Champion | Championship change | | | Reign statistics | | | Notes | Ref. |
| No. | Champion | Date | Event | Location | Reign | Days | Defenses | Notes | Ref. |
|---|---|---|---|---|---|---|---|---|---|
| 1 | Akira | December 27, 2012 | Tokyo Korakuen Hall Tournament | Tokyo, Japan | 1 | 119 | 1 | Akira defeated Tajiri in the finals of an eight-man tournament to become the inaugural champion. | |
| 2 | Osamu Nishimura | April 25, 2013 | Korakuen Hall Dai Kessen | Tokyo, Japan | 1 | 105 | 0 | | |
| 3 | Tajiri | August 8, 2013 | Kumamoto Tournament | Kumamoto, Japan | 1 | 203 | 5 | | |
| 4 | StarBuck | February 27, 2014 | Shinjuku Face Tournament | Tokyo, Japan | 1 | 9 | 0 | | |
| 5 | Bernard VanDamme | March 8, 2014 | Talvisota VIII | Helsinki, Finland | 1 | 110 | 2 | This was an event held by Fight Club Finland. | |
| — | Deactivated | June 26, 2014 | Shin-Kiba 1st Ring Tournament | Tokyo, Japan | — | — | — | The championship retired due to WNC having shut down on June 26, 2014. | |
| 6 | Yuji Kito | March 24, 2018 | Asuka Project | Tokyo, Japan | 1 | 124 | 1 | Kito defeated Shunsuke Sayama in the finals of an eight-man tournament when the championship is revived by Asuka Project. | |
| — | Deactivated | July 26, 2018 | Asuka Project | Tokyo, Japan | — | — | — | Kito stops defending the championship in Asuka Project; loses to Kuroshio TOKYO Japan on November 8, 2024, in a decision match for the revived SMASH Championship. | |

== See also ==
- Wrestling New Classic
- WNC Women's Championship
- Smash Championship
