= Akira Nogami =

Japanese professional wrestler and actor

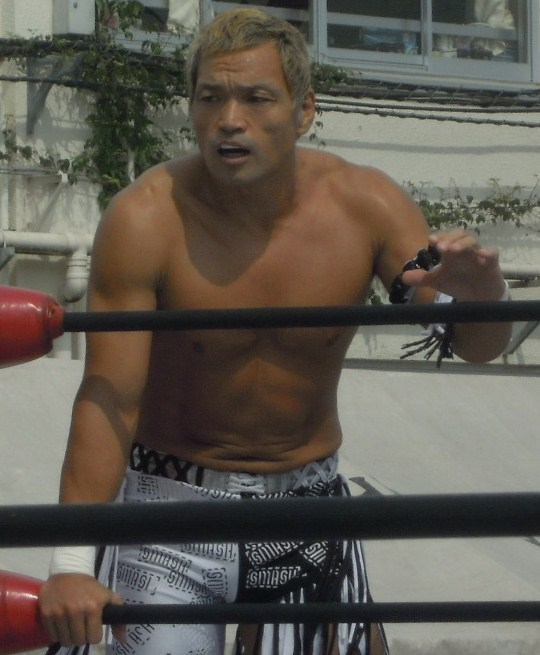
- Nogami in September 2011

Personal information
- Born: March 13, 1966 (age 60) Narashino, Chiba, Japan

Professional wrestling career
- Ring name(s): Akira; Akira Nogami; Sue Takafusa
- Billed height: 180 cm (5 ft 11 in)
- Billed weight: 90 kg (198 lb)
- Trained by: NJPW Dojo
- Debut: October 12, 1984

Akira Nogami (野上 彰, Nogami Akira; born March 13, 1966) is a Japanese professional wrestler and actor, currently working as Akira (occasionally stylised in all-capitals). He has also worked as a trainer.

== Professional wrestling career ==
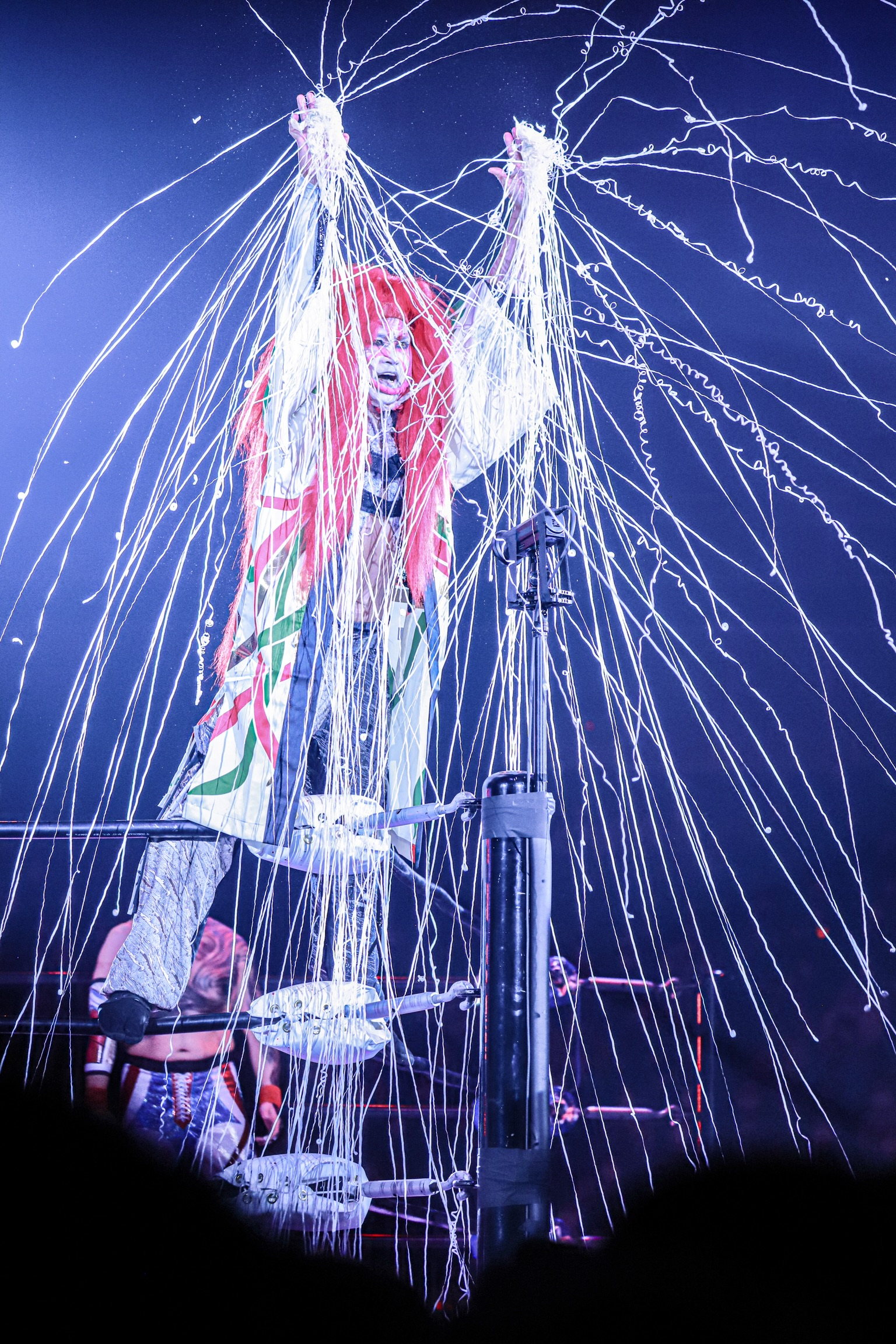
Nogami at The Great Muta Final "Bye-Bye" show promoted by Pro Wrestling Noah on January 22, 2023.

=== New Japan Pro-Wrestling (1984–2004) ===
After graduating from high school in 1984, Nogami was initiated into the New Japan Pro-Wrestling (NJPW) dojo. He debuted in October of that year against Keiji Mutoh. In April 1990, he left on an overseas learning excursion to Europe in Otto Wanz's Catch Wrestling Association and returned to NJPW a year later. Showing a new wrestling style, he changed his name to Akira (stylized in all capital letters) and adopted the gimmick of a kumadori-wearing kabuki actor. Akira scored a big win over Jyushin Thunder Liger in August 1991 to begin his one and only reign as IWGP Junior Heavyweight Champion.

After losing the title to Norio Honaga in November 1991, he graduated to the heavyweight division. In June 1992, he teamed up with Hiroshi Hase to participate in the NWA World Tag Team Championship tournament, held by World Championship Wrestling. They defeated the Headhunters in the first round and the Fabulous Freebirds in the second, but Akira suffered an eye injury against Shinya Hashimoto on June 20, and was replaced by this latter for the remainder of the tournament. In September 1993, he formed the J-J-Jacks with Takayuki Iizuka. After proving that the team was no threat to the IWGP Tag Team Championship, the J-J-Jacks disbanded in March 1996, as Iizuka teamed up with Kazuo Yamazaki, with whom he won the titles, while Nogami joined Shiro Koshinaka's Heisei Ishingun.

Nogami suffered another serious eye injury in 1998 and returned in February 1999, becoming a member of Masahiro Chono's Team 2000. Akira changed his appearance, giving up his kabuki makeup for sinister black facepaint and blond hair. During 2000, he had a recurring role in the TV show Kamen Rider Kuuga. From 2001 onward, he wrestled mainly in the junior heavyweight division and engaged in some classic matches. After failing to reach a new contract agreement with New Japan in 2004, Nogami declared himself a freelancer and began competing only part-time.

=== All Japan Pro Wrestling (2004–2007) ===
Since leaving NJPW, Nogami has become a regular in Keiji Mutoh's All Japan Pro Wrestling where he has been a consistent threat to the juniors. He currently has a successful acting career that consumes much of his time, but still appears on numerous events each year.

=== Return to NJPW (2007–2010) ===
Nogami announced that he would be returning to New Japan to team up with Jyushin Thunder Liger against Jado & Gedo on the C.T.U farewell show. Akira and Liger would join up with Masahiro Chono's Legend stable. Legend would feud with multiple stables such as RISE and Great Bash Heel. On February 24, 2008, he and Liger defeated RISE members Minoru and Prince Devitt win the IWGP Junior Heavyweight Tag Team Championship, Nogami's first title in over 16 years. After holding the titles for just a few months, the pair lost them to Minoru and Devitt on July 21, 2008 in their rematch. Akira took part in the Best of the Super Juniors XV and gained four points and therefore not progressing to the semifinal. A month later, he would participate in IWGP Junior Heavyweight Championship tournament and got to the semifinals before being eliminated by Tiger Mask. In 2009, Akira gained six points in the Best of the Super Juniors XVI and gained two points in G1 Tag League when he teamed up with Chono. In the first round of the Super J-Cup he lost to Masato Onodera. In February 2010, Akira left New Japan Pro-Wrestling, shortly after Chono's departure and therefore Legend was completely broken up, however, his return to the company was announced just two months later. He would participate in the Best of the Super Juniors and gained eight points but didn't progress to the semifinals. Since joining SMASH, Akira has sporadically appeared for New Japan with SMASH talent such as Kushida. Speaking of Kushida, the pair took part in the first ever Super J Tag League and gained only four points and not progressing any further.

=== SMASH and Wrestling New Classic (2010–2014) ===
After leaving NJPW, Nogami found a new home in Yoshihiro Tajiri's Smash promotion, where he worked as a member of the Smash Seikigun until the promotion folded on March 14, 2012. The following month, Nogami was announced as part of the roster of Wrestling New Classic, the follow-up promotion to Smash. On April 26, Akira defeated Tajiri in the main event of WNC's first event. As a result, Akira earned the right to face final Smash Champion Dave Finlay at WNC's second event on May 24 in a match, which he went on to lose. On June 22, Akira turned heel, first bloodying Yusuke Kodama in a singles match and then attacking Tajiri after the main event. On July 15, Akira's former Smash rival StarBuck turned on his protégé Hajime Ohara and then announced that he was joining forces with Akira. They were also joined by Syuri, with all three feeling disgruntled by the supposed changes that had taken place since the transition from Smash. The three wrestled their first match as a unit on August 2, defeating Hajime Ohara, Kana and Tajiri in a six-person tag team main event, with Akira pinning Ohara for the win. The trio continued their winning ways during the following two days by first defeating the trio of Kana, Tajiri and Yusuke Kodama in a main event in Osaka and then the trio of Hanzo, Kana and Seiki in a semi-main event in Hiroshima. On August 30, the trio main evented another WNC event in Korakuen Hall, defeating Mikey Whipwreck, Kana and Tajiri in a Barbed Wire Board Deathmatch, with Akira pinning Whipwreck for the win. Akira, StarBuck and Syuri were also victorious in a rematch the following day in Osaka, with Akira this time pinning Tajiri for the win. In the second rematch on September 1, Whipwreck pinned StarBuck for the win, ending the villainous trio's win streak in the process. On September 20, Akira defeated Kana in an intergender match at Korakuen Hall. On October 24, Akira, StarBuck and Syuri named their stable "Synapse". Two days later, Akira entered the WNC Championship tournament, defeating Adam Angel in his first round match. On November 28, Akira defeated Tommy Dreamer to advance to the finals of the tournament. On December 27, Akira defeated Tajiri to win the tournament and become the inaugural WNC Champion. In January 2013, Big Japan Pro Wrestling representative Shinya Ishikawa and Dutch wrestler Emil Sitoci became the fourth and fifth members of Synapse. However, Sitoci ended up turning on Akira on February 28 and afterwards challenged him to a match for the WNC Championship. On March 31, Akira defeated Sitoci to make his first successful defense of the WNC Championship. On April 25 at WNC's one year anniversary event, Akira lost the WNC Championship to Osamu Nishimura in his second defense. A month later, Nishimura, along with Michael Kovac, joined Synapse. Akira disbanded the stable on February 27, 2014.

On June 18, 2014, Tajiri announced that WNC would be going inactive following June 26. Effective July 1, six former WNC wrestlers, Akira and Tajiri included, transferred over to the Wrestle-1 promotion.

=== Wrestle-1 (2014–2016) ===
Akira made his Wrestle-1 debut on July 21, 2014, teaming with Tajiri in a tag team match, where they were defeated by Keiji Mutoh and Masakatsu Funaki. In September, Akira took part in the Wrestle-1 Championship tournament, where he made it to the second round, before losing to Funaki. In mid-2014, Akira entered a storyline, where Manabu Soya began accusing him of being a spy for the villainous Desperado stable. However, after it was revealed that Soya had been wrong and Tajiri had been the spy, Akira and Soya formed a tag team on November 1. On November 5, the team was officially named "new Wild order". Later that same month, new Wild order took part in the First Tag League Greatest tournament, set to determine the inaugural Wrestle-1 Tag Team Champions, where they finished second in their block with a record of two wins, one draw and one loss, advancing to the semifinals. On November 30, new Wild order defeated Masayuki Kono and Tajiri to advance to the finals of the tournament, where, later that same day, they were defeated by Kaz Hayashi and Shuji Kondo in the finals. On June 18, 2015, Jun Kasai and rookie Kumagoro joined Soya and Akira as the third and fourth members of new Wild order, turning it from a tag team into a stable. On June 28, 2016, Akira announced he was leaving Wrestle-1 due to his contract with the company expiring.

== Championships and accomplishments ==
- Combat Championship Zone
  - CZW World Heavyweight Championship (1 time, current)
- New Japan Pro-Wrestling
  - IWGP Junior Heavyweight Championship (1 time)
  - IWGP Junior Heavyweight Tag Team Championship (1 time) – with Jushin Thunder Liger
  - One Night Tag Team Tournament (1996) – with Michiyoshi Ohara
- Pro Wrestling Illustrated
  - Ranked No. 63 of the top 500 singles wrestlers in the PWI 500 in 1993
- Wrestle-1
  - Wrestle-1 Tag Team Championship (1 time) – with Manabu Soya
- Wrestling New Classic
  - WNC Championship (1 time)
  - WNC Championship Tournament (2012)
