= Smash (professional wrestling) =

Japanese puroresu (professional wrestling) promotion

- Founded: February 2, 2010
- Defunct: March 14, 2012
- Style: Puroresu; Strong style
- Founder: Yoshihiro Tajiri
- Owner: Quantum Jump Japan Co. Ltd.
- Merged with: Pancrase
- Predecessor: Hustle
- Successor: Wrestling New Classic

Smash was a Japanese puroresu and combat sports promotion, founded in December 2009 following the folding of Hustle. In the fall of 2009 Hustle ran into financial problems that led to several show cancellations. After a planned restructuring and restarting of the promotion failed, a number of officials and wrestlers decided to start a new project. Smash held its first show on March 26, 2010.

Smash promoted three divisions: professional wrestling, mixed martial arts and kickboxing. The professional wrestling branch is led by Yoshihiro Tajiri, while Akira Shoji is responsible for the MMA branch. Yuji Shimada leads the overall supervision of the whole project. Since 2010 Smash has had an active exchange of wrestlers with the Finnish Fight Club Finland promotion.

In April 2011, it was announced that Deep and the MMA division of Smash had formed an amateur promotion named the Japan MMA League (JML).

On February 10, 2012, Smash announced that the promotion would be folding after its March 14 event, following a disagreement between Tajiri and financial backer (Quantum Jump Japan CEO) Masakazu Sakai. On April 5, 2012, Tajiri announced the follow-up promotion to Smash, Wrestling New Classic, which would hold its first event on April 26. On June 1, 2012, Sakai and his Smash backers bought Pancrase, officially incorporating Smash's MMA division into the promotion and re-affirming the partnership with Deep in JML.

== Roster ==
=== Smash Seikigun ===
- AKIRA
- Jiro Kuroshio
- Koji Doi
- Lin Bairon
- Makoto
- Syuri
- TAJIRI
- Yoshiaki Yago
- Yusuke Kodama

=== Fight Club Finland ===
- Hajime Ohara
- Jessica Love
- StarBuck

=== Triple Tails.S ===
- Kana
- Mio Shirai

=== Unaffiliated ===
- Aki Shizuku
- Akira Shinose
- Dave Finlay
- Genichiro Tenryu
- Kim Namhun
- Mentallo
- Takuya Kito
- Tomoka Nakagawa
- Último Dragón
- Yo-Hey

=== Notable guests ===
- Akira Shoji
- Atsushi Kotoge
- Ayumi Kurihara
- Big Boy
- Bushwhacker Luke Williams
- Cherry
- Chii Tomiya
- D-Ray 3000
- Daisuke Harada
- Danny Duggan
- El Samurai
- Emi Sakura
- Eugene
- Funaki
- Gabriel Antonic
- Gypsy Joe
- Hikari Minami
- Hikaru Shida
- Io Shirai
- Isami Kodaka
- Jun Kasai
- Jyushin Thunder Liger
- Kaori Yoneyama
- Kaoru
- Kaz Hayashi
- Kenso
- Kushida
- Leatherface
- Meiko Satomura
- Michael Kovac

- Minoru Suzuki
- Mitsuo Momota
- Mochi Miyagi
- Murat Bosporus
- Nagisa Nozaki
- Nanae Takahashi
- Nunzio
- Prince Devitt
- Riho
- Rob Raw
- Sabu
- Sayaka Obihiro
- Scotty 2 Hotty
- Serena
- Sugar Dunkerton
- Super Crazy
- Taka Michinoku
- Takao Omori
- Takashi Iizuka
- Tatsumi Fujinami
- Tetsuya Naito
- Tommy Dreamer
- Toshie Uematsu
- Tsubasa Kuragaki
- Tsukasa Fujimoto
- Tsukushi
- Veneno
- Yoshiaki Fujiwara

== Championships ==
Championship	Final Champion(s)	Date won	Previous Champion(s)
Smash Championship	Dave Finlay	November 24, 2011	StarBuck
Smash Diva Championship	Syuri	February 19, 2012	Kana

== See also ==
- Professional wrestling in Japan
