= Hajime Ohara =

Japanese professional wrestler

Hajime Ohara 大原はじめ
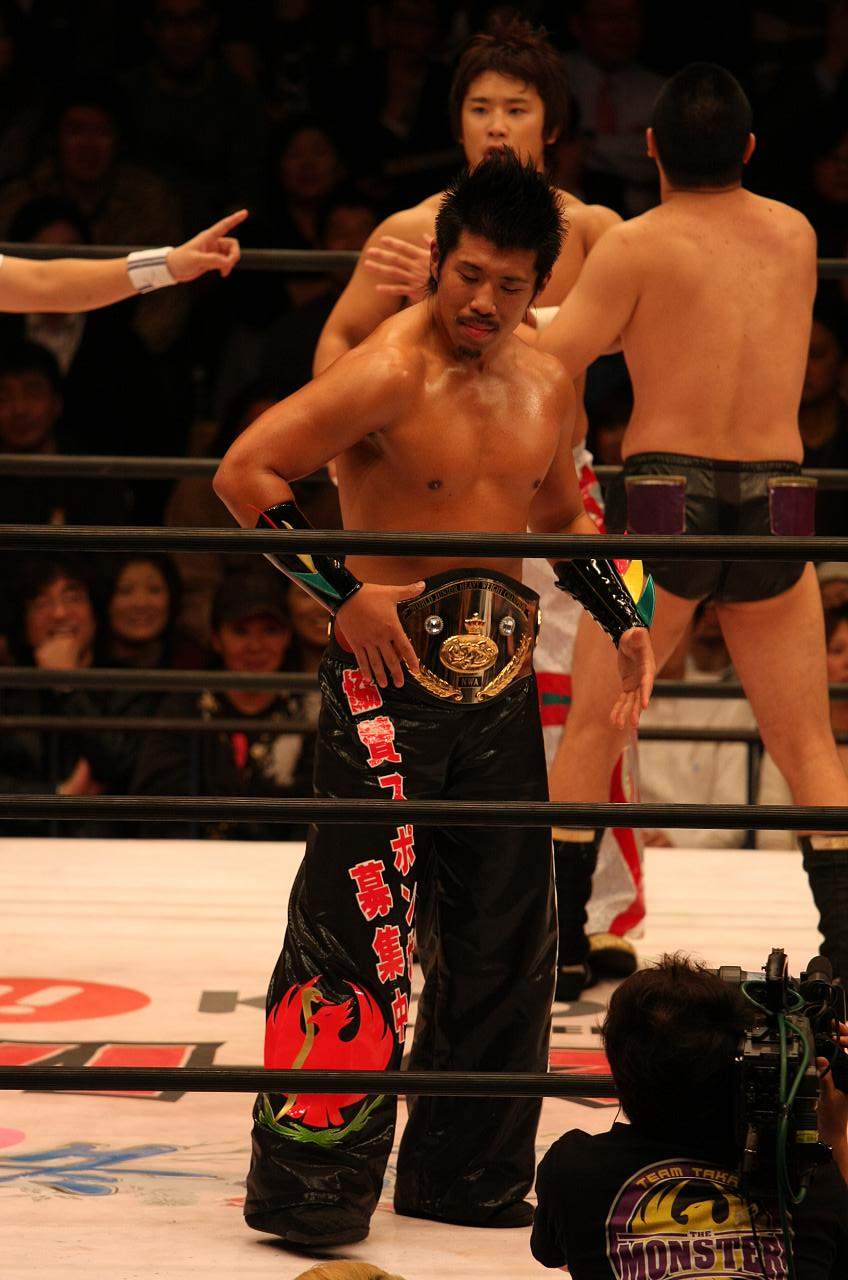
- Ohara as the NWA International Junior Heavyweight Champion

Personal information
- Born: July 24, 1984 (age 42) Kawasaki City, Kanagawa

Professional wrestling career
- Ring name(s): Dark Dragon; Hajime Ohara; Kiki; Kiki Ohara; Maybach Suwa Jr. Ohara; Rey Ohara
- Billed height: 1.74 m (5 ft 8 1/2 in)
- Billed weight: 90 kg (198 lb)
- Trained by: Jorge Rivera; Último Dragón
- Debut: May 16, 2004

Hajime Ohara (Japanese: 大原 甫, Ōhara Hajime; ring name: 大原はじめ, born July 24, 1984) is a Japanese professional wrestler. He is signed to Pro Wrestling Noah, where he is a one time GHC Junior Heavyweight Champion and a six-time GHC Junior Heavyweight Tag Team Champion. Ohara also previous working for Consejo Mundial de Lucha Libre (CMLL) in Mexico for several years as part of his training, mixing the lucha libre style of Mexico with the Japanese Puroresu style of wrestling. In Japan, Ohara is best known for his work in the Hustle, Smash and Wrestling New Classic (WNC).

== Professional wrestling career ==
=== Early career (2004–2009) ===
Hajime Ohara began his professional wrestling career in Mexico, training at the Toryumon Mexico dojo under Último Dragón and Jorge Rivera, better known as Skayde. On May 16, 2004, Ohara made his professional wrestling debut in a losing effort against Kanjyouro Matsuyama. Ohara spent the first five year of his career predominantly in Mexico, wrestling most notably with Toryumon Mexico and Consejo Mundial de Lucha Libre (CMLL). During his years in Mexico, Ohara also fought in mixed martial arts, obtaining a record of eleven wins and three losses with his most notable win coming against AAA star Electroshock.

Ohara lost to Kazuchika Okada in the first round of Young Dragons Cup 2004 and teamed up with Okada in the Yamaha Cup 2005, losing to Hiromi Horiguchi and Ryusuke Taguchi in the semi-final. Ohara and Okada would meet again in the final of the Young Dragons Cup 2005 where Okada got the better of him once again to win the Young Dragons Cup. On August 28, 2005, Ohara made his debut for CMLL teaming with Okumura and Ryusuke Taguchi and losing to Brazo de Plata, Negro Casas and Último Dragón. In late 2005, Ohara formed La Ola Amarilla (Spanish for "The Yellow Wave") with Masada and Okumura. Ohara was part of the 2006 International Grand Prix but was the first man eliminated when he was pinned by Heavy Metal. On April 16, 2006, Ohara wrestled his first match in Japan as part of an Último Dragón produce show, defeating Guillermo Akiba.

On May 13, 2006 Ohara defeated La Máscara to win the vacant NWA World Welterweight Championship, becoming the first NWA Welterweight champion in almost two years. Ohara made two successful title defences against Fantasma Jr. and El Hijo del Fantasma. On January 20, 2007 Ohara lost the title to Super Delfin during an Osaka Pro wrestling show in Japan, but regained the title on February 10 before returning to Mexico. On May 13, Ohara successfully defend his title against La Máscara. By the end of 2007 a deal had been struck between Último Dragón, who owned the NWA title and CMLL to return ownership of the championship to CMLL, who had owned the title until 1996. On November 27, 2007 Ohara lost the title to CMLL regular La Sombra.

Throughout 2008 and 2009, Ohara feuded with his mentor Último Dragón across three continents and multiple promotions including Dradition in Japan, Nu-Wrestling Evotolution (NWE) in Europe and Toryumon in Mexico. In NWE, Ohara wrestled under a mask as Dark Dragon, an evil counterpart to Último Dragon. On June 28, 2008, Ohara lost a lucha de apuestas match to Último Dragón and was forced to unmask. On December 14, Ohara defeated Último Dragón to win the NWA International Junior Heavyweight Championship. In Japan, he debuted for Hustle as Ray Ohara on December 24, joining the Monster Army and developing a one sided rivalry with the Hustle Supernova Kushida. After trading tag and trios wins, the pair finally met in a singles match on January 29, 2009 where Ohara emerged victories. Nevertheless, on February 19, Kushida was rewarded a title shot for Ohara's NWA International Junior Heavyweight Championship which ended in a no contest. Three days later, Kushida defeated Ohara in a tag team match and demanded another title shot. Ohara agreed on the condition that Kushida would leave Hustle should he lose; Kushida accepted. On March 25, Ohara defeated Kushida, forcing Kushida to leave the promotion. Back in Mexico, on August 22, Ohara and Último Dragón finally settled their rivalry in a mask vs hair match which Último Dragón won. On September 13, Ohara exacted some revenge as he defended his NWA International Junior Heavyweight Championship against Último Dragón at Dradition. Ohara held the NWA International Junior Heavyweight championship for 291 days before losing the belt to Mineo Fujita on October 1, 2009. At the final Hustle event on November 10, Ohara teamed with Super Crazy and lost to KG and Último Dragón.

=== Pro Wrestling Zero1 (2009–2010) ===
Ohara would make his Pro Wrestling Zero1 debut on November 19, 2009, under Hajime Ohara and beat Shota Takanishi. Ten days later he would participate in Tenka-Ichi Junior Tournament 2009 and was defeated by Fujita Hayato in the second round. Ohara would go on to team up with Shiro Koshinaka to take part in Furinkazan, a round-robin tag team tournament, in block B. Their first match against Kamikaze and Kohei Sato ended in a time limit draw and the team would go on the win two matches and lost another giving them a total of 5 points which was not enough to progress to the final. Ohara would also take on Ikuto Hidaka for the Zero1 International Junior Heavyweight Championship and lost. Ohara would spend the rest of his time at Zero1 teaming up with wrestlers from Hustle such as Tajiri.

=== Smash (2010–2012) ===
In March 2010, Ohara began working for Yoshihiro Tajiri's new Smash promotion, losing to Kushida in the main event of the promotion's first ever show on March 26. Initially, Ohara worked as a face as part of the Smash Seikigun and a protégé of Tajiri's, working against wrestlers from the Finnish promotion, Fight Club Finland (FCF). On July 24 at Smash.5, Ohara was squashed by the debuting Finn StarBuck. Later that same day on Smash.6, Ohara turned on Tajiri, after he had lost the FCF Finnish Heavyweight Championship to StarBuck in the main event. The following month, Ohara traveled to Helsinki, Finland to unsuccessfully challenge StarBuck for the title, after which he kneeled before him and adopted him as his new mentor. Later that same month, Ohara began representing FCF in Smash, forming a regular partnership with transsexual wrestler Jessica Love and often accompanying StarBuck to his matches, while also starting a feud with Tajiri's number one protégé, Kushida. The rivalry ended on March 31, 2011, at Smash.15, when Ohara defeated Kushida with his new finishing manoeuvre, the Finnish Forearm, in Kushida's final Smash match, before leaving for New Japan Pro-Wrestling. On June 9, Ohara entered a tournament to determine the first ever Smash Champion, defeating Último Dragón in his first round match. However, on August 11, Ohara was eliminated from the tournament by Veneno. In October, the Smash Seikigun and Fight Club Finland groups were brought together by the arrival of Dave Finlay. On November 24 at Smash.23, Ohara pinned Tajiri in a tag team match, where he teamed with the returning Jessica Love and Tajiri with Último Dragon. After the main event, where Finlay defeated StarBuck for the Smash Championship, Ohara agreed to team up with Tajiri to protect Smash from the Irishman. On February 10, 2012, Smash announced that the promotion would be folding after its March 14 event, after which Ohara would become a free agent. On March 14, Ohara wrestled in Smash's final match, where he and StarBuck were defeated by Akira and Tajiri.

=== Wrestling New Classic (2012–2013) ===
On April 5, 2012, Ohara was announced as part of the roster of Wrestling New Classic (WNC), the follow-up promotion to Smash. For WNC's first event, Ohara wanted to face New Japan Pro-Wrestling's IWGP Heavyweight Champion Kazuchika Okada, but when he went to confront Okada backstage at a NJPW event, he was stopped by his spokesman, Gedo, who told him he was unqualified to meet Okada and challenged him to a match himself. On April 26, Ohara was defeated by Gedo at WNC's first event. On May 24 at WNC's second event, Ohara was defeated by Okada and Gedo's Chaos stablemate Toru Yano. Afterwards, Ohara was attacked by Pro Wrestling Noah's Maybach Taniguchi, who, on June 22, extended Ohara's big match losing streak by defeating him in a singles match. Ohara's losing streak continued on July 15, when he was pinned by Naomichi Marufuji in a tag team match, where he teamed with the returning StarBuck and Marufuji with Tajiri. Following the match, StarBuck attacked Ohara and announced that their partnership was over, before revealing Akira as his new partner. In the following day's main event, Ohara was defeated by StarBuck, continuing his losing streak. On August 2, WNC's new top villainous alliance, StarBuck, Akira and Syuri, defeated Ohara, Kana and Tajiri in a six-person tag team main event, with Akira pinning Ohara to add another loss to his record. Following the loss, Ohara turned on his partners and WNC, forming a new partnership with debuting female wrestler Nagisa Nozaki. The following day, Ohara ended his losing streak by defeating El Hijo del Pantera in a singles match. On August 30, Ohara and Nozaki were joined by Jiro Kuroshio. Meanwhile, Ohara resumed his losing streak, losing to longtime rival Último Dragón via disqualification, after unmasking him, and to Zeus and Veneno following interference from Nozaki. On September 20, Ohara was defeated by Naomichi Marufuji via another disqualification, after attacking the referee of the match. On October 19, Ohara, Nozaki and Kuroshio named their stable "Kabushiki gaisha DQN" On October 26, Ohara entered the WNC Championship tournament, defeating StarBuck in his first round match, following interference from Nozaki and Kuroshio. On November 28, Ohara was eliminated in the semifinals of the tournament by Tajiri. For WNC's final event of 2012, Ohara reignited his rivalry with Zeus, who attacked him during a DQN press conference, looking for revenge for their previous encounter in August. On December 27, Ohara was defeated by Zeus in a singles grudge match. On January 31, 2013, WNC announced that Ohara had decided to part ways with the promotion.

=== Pro Wrestling Noah (2013–present) ===
On May 12, 2013, Ohara began working for Pro Wrestling Noah as a replacement for the injured GHC Junior Heavyweight Tag Team Champion Suwa. As part of his new character, Ohara wore a Maybach Taniguchi mask and worked under the ring name "Maybach Suwa Jr." In July, Suwa Jr. teamed with No Mercy stablemate Genba Hirayanagi in the 2013 NTV G+ Cup Junior Heavyweight Tag League for the now vacant GHC Junior Heavyweight Tag Team Championship, but the two failed to advance from their block. On July 26, Suwa Jr. got himself into title contention, when he defeated GHC Junior Heavyweight Champion Taiji Ishimori in a non-title match. On August 24, Suwa Jr. and Hirayanagi unsuccessfully challenged Jyushin Thunder Liger and Tiger Mask for the GHC Junior Heavyweight Tag Team Championship. During the match, Suwa Jr.'s mask was torn off, revealing his true identity. Afterwards, Ohara once again began working unmasked and under his real name. On December 14, Ohara pinned Taiji Ishimori to win the eleven-man Matsumoto Day Clinic Cup and afterwards challenged him to a match for the GHC Junior Heavyweight Championship. Ohara received his title shot on January 19, 2014, but was defeated by Ishimori.

Six days later, Ohara turned on No Mercy and jumped to the Choukibou-gun stable, forming a new tag team with Kenoh. On March 8, Ohara and Kenoh unsuccessfully challenged Yoshinari Ogawa and Zack Sabre Jr. for the GHC Junior Heavyweight Tag Team Championship. On August 2, Ohara and Kenoh won the 2014 NTV G+ Cup Junior Heavyweight Tag League by defeating Daisuke Harada and Quiet Storm in the finals. As a result of pinning Harada in the finals, Ohara was granted a shot at his GHC Junior Heavyweight Championship on August 17, but was defeated in a three-way match, also involving Zack Sabre Jr. On October 12, Ohara and Kenoh defeated Atsushi Kotoge and Taiji Ishimori to win the GHC Junior Heavyweight Tag Team Championship. On November 1, Ohara and Kenoh made a surprise appearance for New Japan Pro-Wrestling, offering Jyushin Thunder Liger and Tiger Mask a shot at their title. This led to Ohara and Kenoh's first title defense on December 6, where they defeated Liger and Tiger Mask. Their second defense took place on December 27, when they defeated Pesadilla and Super Crazy in a Tables, Ladders, and Chairs match. On January 18, the two made another successful defense against Daisuke Harada and Genba Hirayanagi. On March 15, Ohara and Kenoh lost the GHC Junior Heavyweight Tag Team Championship to Suzuki-gun's El Desperado and Taka Michinoku in a three-way match, also involving Harada and Hirayanagi. On March 28, Noah announced Ohara had signed a contract with the promotion, officially ending his days as a freelancer. On August 22, Ohara and Kenoh received a rematch for the GHC Junior Heavyweight Tag Team Championship, but were again defeated by Desperado and Michinoku. On March 19, 2016, Ohara and Kenoh won the GHC Junior Heavyweight Tag Team Championship for the second time by defeating Atsushi Kotoge and Daisuke Harada. They lost the title back to Kotoge and Harada on April 5. Kenoh and Ohara officially broke up on December 23.

On January 7, 2017, Ohara defeated Taiji Ishimori in a decision match to win the GHC Junior Heavyweight Championship for the first time. After successfully defending the title against Hitoshi Kumano on March 12, the two came together to form a new tag team, later named Back Breakers. On May 27, Ohara lost the GHC Junior Heavyweight Championship to Hayata. Ohara and Kumano participated in the 2017 Global Junior Heavyweight Tag League between July 13 and July 27. The pair had a strong showing with eight points and finished third in the group stage, however were defeated on the final day by Mao and Shunma Katsumata which prevented the team from joining a three-way tie for first place in the group.

== Championships and accomplishments ==
- Dradition
  - NWA International Junior Heavyweight Championship (1 time)
- Pro Wrestling Illustrated
  - PWI ranked him #239 of the top 500 singles wrestlers in the PWI 500 in 2014
- Pro Wrestling Noah
  - GHC Junior Heavyweight Championship (1 time)
  - GHC Junior Heavyweight Tag Team Championship (6 times) – with Kenoh (2), Hitoshi Kumano (1), Daisuke Harada (1), Atsushi Kotoge (1) and Shuji Kondo (1)
  - Matsumoto Day Clinic Cup (2013)
  - NTV G+ Cup Junior Heavyweight Tag League (2014) – with Kenoh
- Toryumon Mexico
  - NWA World Welterweight Championship (2 times)

== Luchas de Apuestas record ==
Winner (wager)	Loser (wager)	Location	Event	Date	Notes
Último Dragón (mask)	Dark Dragon (mask)	Madrid, Spain	Live event	June 25, 2008	
Hajime Ohara (hair)	Brazo de Platino (hair)	Mexico City	Live event	March 1, 2009	
Último Dragón (mask)	Hajime Ohara (hair)	Mexico City	Dragonmania IV	August 22, 2009	

== Mixed martial arts record ==
Professional record breakdown
14 matches	11 wins	3 losses
By submission	11	3

Res.	Record	Opponent	Method	Event	Date	Round	Time	Location	Notes
Loss	11–3	Alberto Castillo	Submission (kneebar)	Xtreme Fighters 1	March 27, 2010	2	1:31	Ciudad Obregón, Mexico	
Win	11–2	Hato Kiyoshi	Submission (triangle choke)	Cage of Combat 4: Spanish Bombs	February 27, 2010	1	1:53	Madrid, Spain	
Win	10–2	Dante Jimenez	Submission (armbar)	Cage of Combat 3: San Vale Tudo	February 13, 2010	1	1:32	Torreón, Mexico	
Win	9–2	Carlo Rangel	Submission (rear naked choke)	Cage of Combat 2: Battleground	January 23, 2010	1	1:21	Toluca, Mexico	
Win	8–2	Electroshock	Submission (guillotine choke)	Cage of Combat 1	December 26, 2009	1	2:04	Veracruz, Mexico	
Win	7–2	Gonzalo Americo	Submission (triangle choke)	Gracie Evolution of Combat 4	November 29, 2009	2	1:24	León, Mexico	
Win	6–2	Galo Robles	Submission (rear naked choke)	MMA Xtreme 20	March 15, 2008	1	1:12	Mexico	
Win	5–2	Beneto Porti	Submission (armbar)	MMA Xtreme 17	December 15, 2007	2	1:01	Honduras	
Win	4–2	Nestor Martinez	Submission (rear naked choke)	MMA Xtreme 14	October 13, 2007	1	1:12	Honduras	
Win	3–2	Marco Galavit	Submission (rear naked choke)	MMA Xtreme 10	March 31, 2007	1	1:21	Santo Domingo, Dominican Republic	
Win	2–2	Carlo Angel	Submission (armbar)	MMA Xtreme 5	September 23, 2006	3	0:00	Argentina	
Loss	1–2	Akbarh Arreola	Submission (armbar)	MMA Xtreme 4	August 19, 2006	1	N/A	Tijuana, Mexico	
Win	1–1	Mazada Matsuki	Submission (guillotine choke)	Vallarta Extremo 3	July 4, 2006	1	2:13	Mexico	
Loss	0–1	Mazada Matsuki	Submission (rear naked choke)	Vallarta Extremo 1	March 25, 2006	1	1:01	Mexico	
