= Smash Championship =

Japanese professional wrestling championship

Details
- Promotion: Smash (2011–2012); Kuroshio Tokyo Japan Produce (2024–present)
- Date established: October 28, 2011
Statistics
- First champion: StarBuck
- Final champion: Dave Finlay
- Most reigns: All champions (1 reign)
- Longest reign: Dave Finlay (87 days)
- Shortest reign: StarBuck (27 days)
- Oldest champion: Dave Finlay (53 years, 35 days)
- Youngest champion: StarBuck (38 years, 187 days)
- Heaviest champion: Dave Finlay (107 kg (236 lb))
- Lightest champion: StarBuck (102 kg (225 lb))

The Smash Championship was a professional wrestling championship, owned and promoted by the Japanese Smash promotion. Championship reigns were determined by professional wrestling matches, in which competitors were involved in scripted rivalries. These narratives created feuds between the various competitors, which cast them as villains and heroes.

The title was retired with the promotion in 2012, with the WNC Championship serving as a spiritual successor between then and 2018. In 2024, Jiro Kuroshio revived the title in his "Kuroshio Tokyo Japan Produce" independent cards.

== Tournament ==
The tournament to crown the inaugural champion was held over five months and five events. The first round was held over two events, Smash.18 and Smash.19 on June 9 and July 15, 2011, the second round at Smash.20 on August 11, the semifinals at Smash.21 on September 8, and the finals at Smash.22 on October 28, 2011.

The tournament brackets were:

Round one (Smash.18–19)
Shinya Ishikawa	Pin
Yusuke Kodama	7:51
Funaki	7:53
Tajiri	Pin
Akira	DQ
Takashi Iizuka	8:37
Yoshiaki Yago	4:17
Zeus	Pin
Hajime Ohara	Pin
Último Dragón	17:20
Katsutoshi Kito	7:02
Veneno	Pin
Genichiro Tenryu	Pin
Michael Kovac	5:56
StarBuck	Bye
*

Round two (Smash.20)
Shinya Ishikawa	9:27
Tajiri	Pin
Akira	Pin
Zeus	7:55
Hajime Ohara	9:32
Veneno	Pin
Genichiro Tenryu	7:33
StarBuck	Pin

Semifinals (Smash.21)
Tajiri	19:41
Akira	Pin
Veneno	13:25
StarBuck	Pin

Finals (Smash.22)
Tajiri	15:12
StarBuck	Pin

* StarBuck won an eight-man tournament in Fight Club Finland (FCF) to advance to the second round of the Smash Championship tournament.

== Title history ==
Key
No.	Overall reign number
Reign	Reign number for the specific champion
Days	Number of days held
Defenses	Number of successful defenses

No.	Champion	Championship change			Reign statistics			Notes	Ref.
No.	Champion	Date	Event	Location	Reign	Days	Defenses	Notes	Ref.
1	StarBuck	October 28, 2011	Smash.22	Tokyo, Japan	1	27	2	StarBuck defeated Tajiri in the finals of a fifteen-man tournament to become the inaugural champion.	
2	Dave Finlay	November 24, 2011	Smash.23	Tokyo, Japan	1	87	1		
—	Vacated	February 19, 2012	Smash.25	Tokyo, Japan	—	—	—	Tajiri retired the championship at the end of the final Smash event.	
—	Deactivated	March 14, 2012	Smash.Final	Tokyo, Japan	—	—	—	On February 10, 2012, Smash announced it would cease its operations on March 14, 2012. Dave Finlay vacated the championship at the promotion's penultimate event.	
3	Kuroshio TOKYO Japan	November 8, 2024	Kuroshio TOKYO Japan Produce Everyone Will Love Tokyo Japan Even More	Tokyo, Japan	1	0	0	Kuroshio defeated Yuji Kito, the last recognized WNC champion, in a decision match to win the revived Smash championship.	
4	Shotaro Ashino	November 8, 2024	Kuroshio TOKYO Japan Produce Everyone Will Love Tokyo Japan Even More	Tokyo, Japan	1	66	0	Ashino challenged Kuroshio after the match and won the championship.	
5	Seigo Tachibana	January 13, 2025	Kuroshio TOKYO Japan Produce Kuroshio TOKYO Japan 15th Anniversary ~ King Of Style Strong	Tokyo, Japan	1	525	0	Tachibana won a four-way dance, defeating Ashino, Kumaarashi and Yusuke Kodama.	

== See also ==
- Smash (professional wrestling)
- Smash Diva Championship
- WNC Championship
