= Takashi Iizuka =

Japanese professional wrestler

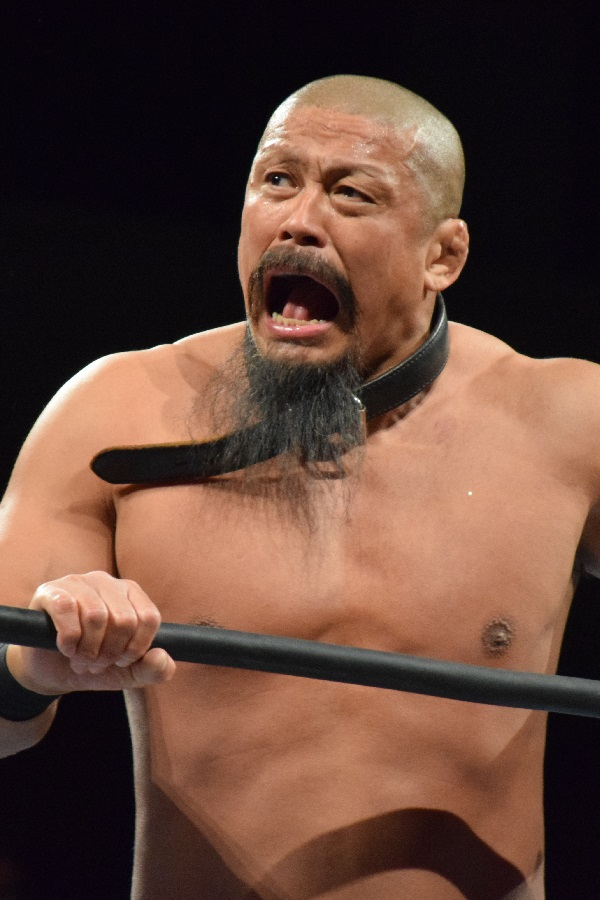
- Iizuka in 2017

Personal information
- Born: August 2, 1966 (age 60) Muroran, Hokkaidō, Japan

Professional wrestling career
- Ring name(s): Sambo Iizuka; Takashi Iizuka; Takayuki Iizuka
- Billed height: 1.81 m (5 ft 11 in)
- Billed weight: 107 kg (236 lb)
- Trained by: New Japan Pro-Wrestling Dojo
- Debut: November 2, 1986
- Retired: February 21, 2019

Takayuki Iizuka (飯塚 孝之, Iizuka Takayuki; born August 2, 1966), better known by his ring name Takashi Iizuka (飯塚 高史, Iizuka Takashi), is a Japanese retired professional wrestler. He is best known for his 33-year career in New Japan Pro-Wrestling (NJPW), where he was a three-time IWGP Tag Team Champion. He has also worked for Pro Wrestling Noah, where he was a one-time GHC Tag Team Champion.

Debuting in 1986 under his real name, Iizuka formed the tag team J-J-Jacks with fellow dojo trainee Akira Nogami in 1992. After changing his ring name to Takashi Iizuka (飯塚 高史, Iizuka Takashi) in 1995, he became a mainstay of the New Japan seikigun, and was a frequent tag team partner for Yuji Nagata during the early 2000s. In 2008, Iizuka underwent a drastic change to his look, character and wrestling style, turning heel, shaving his head bald, growing a sinister beard, and adapting a hardcore wrestling style. He was also given the gimmick of an uncontrollable madman, and nicknamed "The Great Traitor" for his betrayal of the New Japan roster. Iizuka competed for New Japan Pro-Wrestling over four separate decades before retiring from in ring competition in February 2019.

== Professional wrestling career ==
=== New Japan Pro-Wrestling ===
==== Early years (1986–1995) ====
Iizuka made his debut for New Japan Pro-Wrestling in November 1986, wrestling against Akira Nogami in a losing effort. From 1986 to 1988, he would only be used as a pre-show attraction, wrestling other young lions such as Kensuke Sasaki, Kenichi Oya, Osamu Matsuda, Shigeo Miyato and Minoru Suzuki, with this latter wrestling Iizuka in his debut match in June 1988. In June 1989, Iizuka and Hiroshi Hase went to the Soviet Union to be trained in sambo, where he would learn his signature maneuvers, the uranage and the Blizzard Suplex. A month later, he won his first championship, the IWGP Tag Team Championship, with veteran Riki Choshu, defeating Super Strong Machine and George Takano in July 1989. After losing the titles two months later to Shinya Hashimoto and Masa Saito, he floundered in the mid-card. In 1991, he wrestled in Europe, mainly in Austria and Germany for Catch Wrestling Association and in England for All Star Wrestling. He competed only twice in the United States, for the Tri-State Wrestling Alliance on September 21, 1991, against Owen Hart, and for World Championship Wrestling on May 17, 1992, teaming with the legendary Tatsumi Fujinami in a losing effort against The Steiner Brothers at WrestleWar. He formed what eventually became J-J-Jacks with Akira Nogami in 1992, also briefly forming a trio with El Samurai, wrestling in mid-card tag team matches against teams such as Michiyoshi Ohara and Tatsutoshi Goto, Hiro Saito and Norio Honaga, Brad Armstrong and Scott Norton and others, but the team never proved to be any threat to the IWGP Tag Team titles, so they disbanded in 1996, with Nogami joining with Shiro Koshinaka's Heisei Ishingun, while Iizuka began teaming with Kazuo Yamazaki, together winning the IWGP Tag Team Championship on June 12, 1996. They held the championships for 34 days, before dropping them to Masahiro Chono and Hiroyoshi Tenzan.

==== Name change and mid-card run (1995–2006) ====
In October 1995, he changed his ring name from Takayuki to Takashi. In June 1996, he won his second IWGP Tag Team title, this time with another veteran, Kazuo Yamazaki. After losing the titles in July 1996 to Masahiro Chono and Hiroyoshi Tenzan, he was back in the mid-card. 2000 proved to be a great year for Iizuka: on January 4, he teamed with Shinya Hashimoto in a victorious match against Naoya Ogawa and Kazunari Murakami. On July 20, he finally received a shot at the IWGP Heavyweight Championship, despite a losing effort against Kensuke Sasaki. His successful year was capped off by winning the G1 Tag League tournament with Yuji Nagata in November.

After that, Iizuka would suffer a major concussion in a match against Mitsuya Nagai on June 6, 2001, the injury would keep him out until October 6, 2002. Upon his return, he began a feud with Nagai, who by that point joined the Makai Club as Makai #5. The feud with go through the first quarter of 2003 with Iizuka eventually winning two three-match series against Nagai to end the feud. After the feud, he spent the next few years in the mid-card, as well as helping young talent in the New Japan Dojo.

==== Great Bash Heel (2008–2009) ====
On March 9, 2008, after Hiroyoshi Tenzan was attacked by the rest of Great Bash Heel once again just weeks after he had been kicked out of the stable, Iizuka came to his aid, clearing the ring of Tomoaki Honma, Gedo and Jado. Iizuka and Tenzan announced they would be forming a tag team to be known as "Friendship Tag". Friendship Tag proved to be successful, and they defeated Togi Makabe and a number of different partners in the lead up to April.

Iizuka's career would make a radical change in April 2008. During a tag team match with Hiroyoshi Tenzan against then-IWGP Tag Team Champions, Togi Makabe and Toru Yano, Iizuka turned on Tenzan with his trademark sleeper hold, turning heel and joining G.B.H. as their newest member and their insider in the New Japan Seikigun. Upon his heel turn, Iizuka changed his look and wrestling style, shaving his head bald, growing a sinister beard, and adapting a hardcore wrestling style. He was also given the gimmick of an uncontrollable madman, often making his entrances through crowds, violently pushing fans and announcers around. He also began frequently using an iron glove on opponents as his main weapon of choice. For a brief period, Iizuka was also given the nickname: "The Great Traitor" for his betrayal of the New Japan Seikigun.

His first major feud after turning was with the man he betrayed, Tenzan. The two first fought on July 8, 2008, in a Lumberjack Death Match which Tenzan won. The two fought again on October 13, 2008, at Destruction '08 in a Chain Death Match which Iizuka won. Since then Iizuka has gone on to feud with Yuji Nagata, again defeating him in a Chain Death Match on April 5, 2009, but would lose the rematch on May 3, 2009, at Wrestling Dontaku 2009.

==== Chaos (2009–2014) ====
In early 2009, Iizuka, along with most of his stablemates, turned on G.B.H. to join Shinsuke Nakamura's new Chaos group, and in mid-2009 he rekindled his feud with the returning Tenzan. The two would have a third match on July 20, 2009, which would be another Chain Death Match, this time though Tenzan would defeat Iizuka by knockout to end the feud. During the G1 Climax tournament in 2009, Iizuka lost five out of his six matches, mostly by disqualification, due to the use of his iron glove and his new weapon, a steel toothguard. His only non-disqualification loss was to Shinsuke Nakamura by pinfall. And, his only win came against his former tag team partner, Yuji Nagata, who got himself disqualified by throwing the referee out of the ring, whilst he was making his comeback, following Iizuka's repeated use of the steel toothguard and interference from Tomohiro Ishii.

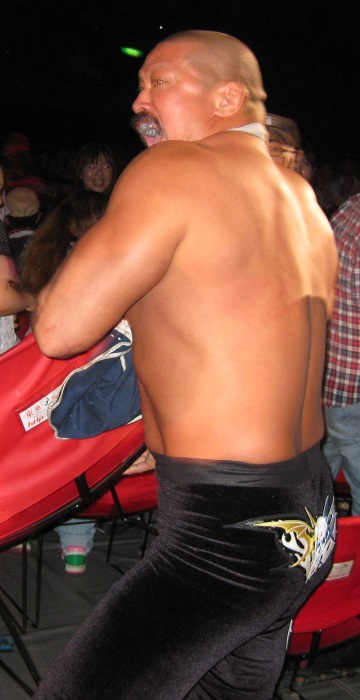
Iizuka in June 2011.

On January 4, 2010, Iizuka teamed with fellow Chaos members Yano and Ishii and Abdullah the Butcher against Riki Choshu, Masahiro Chono, Manabu Nakanishi, and Terry Funk. Iizuka's team lost when tension between Abdullah and Iizuka led to their loss. On December 11, 2010, Iizuka restarted his feud with Hiroyoshi Tenzan, who had just returned after being sidelined for fifteen months due to an injury. On January 4, 2011, at Wrestle Kingdom V in Tokyo Dome, Tenzan defeated Iizuka in a Deep Sleep to Lose match, a match that could only be won by choking the opponent unconscious. On May 3, 2012, at Wrestling Dontaku 2012, Iizuka won his first title in sixteen years, when he and Toru Yano defeated Hiroyoshi Tenzan and Satoshi Kojima for the IWGP Tag Team Championship. On June 20, Iizuka and Yano were stripped of the title, after their title rematch with Tenzan and Kojima ended in a no contest. They would eventually lose to TenKoji in a decision match for the vacant title on July 22. In early 2013, Iizuka and Yano began making appearances for Pro Wrestling Noah, which led to them defeating Naomichi Marufuji and Takashi Sugiura for the GHC Tag Team Championship on March 10, 2013. They lost the title to TMDK (Mikey Nicholls and Shane Haste) in their third defense on July 7.

==== Suzuki-gun (2014–2019) ====
On May 25, 2014, at Back to the Yokohama Arena, Iizuka turned on Yano and Chaos and jumped to the Suzuki-gun stable. On January 10, 2015, Iizuka took part in an angle, where he, along with the rest of Suzuki-gun, invaded the Pro Wrestling Noah promotion. Iizuka worked regularly for Noah until the storyline concluded in December 2016, which led to the stable returning to NJPW on January 5, 2017. A couple of months later, Iizuka suffered a broken left ankle, which sidelined him until August.

=== Retirement ===
After 33 years with New Japan Pro-Wrestling, on January 7, 2019, NJPW Chairman Naoki Sugabayashi announced Iizuka would retire from professional wrestling the following month, with his retirement match taking place on February 21. In the weeks leading up to his retirement match, Iizuka's former partner Hiroyoshi Tenzan, whom Iizuka turned on in 2008, began attempting to get the "old" Iizuka back, wearing a Friendship Tag t-shirt and constantly reminding Iizuka of their past together. After being attacked by Iizuka at every attempt, Tenzan said he would face Iizuka in one last attempt to get his old friend back. In Iizuka's last match on February 21, he, Minoru Suzuki and Taichi were defeated by Tenzan, Kazuchika Okada (who was once one of Iizuka's students) and Toru Yano (his former Chaos partner). After the match, Tenzan once again begged Iizuka to return to his former self, and Iizuka finally gave in and shook hands with Tenzan, reuniting Friendship Tag albeit for mere seconds as Iizuka and the rest of Suzuki-gun attacked Tenzan, Okada and Yano. Afterwards, his signature iron glove was left in the ring as the fans applauded and chanted his name.

== Championships and accomplishments ==
- New Japan Pro-Wrestling
  - IWGP Tag Team Championship (3 times) – with Riki Choshu (1), Kazuo Yamazaki (1) and Toru Yano (1)
  - G1 Tag League (2000) – with Yuji Nagata
  - Technique Award (2000)
- Nikkan Sports
  - Technique Award (2000)
- Pro Wrestling Illustrated
  - Ranked him No. 111 of the 500 best wrestlers of the PWI 500 in 1996
- Pro Wrestling Noah
  - GHC Tag Team Championship (1 time) – with Toru Yano
- Tokyo Sports
  - Best Bout Award (2011) with Toru Yano vs. Keiji Mutoh and Kenta Kobashi, All Together, August 27
  - Technique Award (2000)

== Submission grappling record ==
KO PUNCHES

Result	Opponent	Method	Event	Date	Round	Time	Notes
Loss	(Japan) Minoru Suzuki	Decision (unanimous)	Pancrase: 10th Anniversary Show	August 31, 2003	2	5:00	Catch-wrestling rules
