= Taro Suruga =

Japanese musician and actor

- 駿河 太郎
- Born: 5 June 1978 (age 48); Nishinomiya, Hyōgo Prefecture, Japan
- Other name: taro
- Occupations: Actor; musician
- Years active: 2003–present
- Agent: Sticker
- Known for: Human Note vocalist and guitarist; Former sleepydog vocalist and guitarist
- Television: Carnation
- Father: Shōfukutei Tsurube II
- Website: Official profile

Taro Suruga (駿河 太郎, Suruga Tarō; born 5 June 1978) is a Japanese musician and actor from Nishinomiya, Hyōgo Prefecture.

== Biography ==
His father is rakugo performer Shōfukutei Tsurube II. He graduated from Shinko Gakuen Shinko High School and Osaka University of Arts Junior College. After studying in England for two years, he made his debut music release on the label Polystar as "taro" in 2003. After that, he formed the band "sleepydog", performing vocals and guitar. In 2008, when he became 30 years old, he decided to turn to acting. He has appeared in both films and television dramas.

In February 2011, he finished his "sleepydog" activities and started, along with sleepydog guitarist Takayuki Moriya. a new unit named "Human Note".

From 3 October 2011, he played the main role of Masaru Kawamoto in the Carnation television series (broadcast by NHK Asadora Osaka Broadcasting Station).

In 2013, he played a role in Tokyo Broadcasting System Television's Hanzawa Naoki.

== Filmography ==
=== Films ===
- Girl in the Sunny Place (2014), Wataru (Note: SSFF&Asia 2014 × Uula short film special production project work.)
- A Family (2014), Furuya
- Yume ni–Ai no tobashiri (2016), Yumeji Takehisa
- Cinderella Game (2016), Takimoto
- Samurai's Promise (2018)
- A Family (2021)
- Every Trick in the Book (2021)
- It's All My Fault (2022), Ryo Shiraishi
- Hard Days (2023)
- Oshorin (2023)
- Amalock (2024)
- Sakura (2024), Hiroshi Hyodo
- 11 Rebels (2024)
- Faceless (2024)
- Demon City (2025), Fujita
- By 6 A.M. (2025)

=== TV dramas ===
- Ryōmaden (2010), Nogami Seikichi
- Taira no Kiyomori (2012), Taira no Tsunemori
- Gold Woman (2016), Tsutomu Saita
- Idaten (2019), Haruhide Matsushita
- Awaiting Kirin (2020), Tsutsui Junkei
- Bakumatsu Aibō-den (2022), Katsura Kogorō
- New Nobunaga Chronicle: High School Is a Battlefield (2022), Naomasa Ii
- Fixer (2023), Hozumi Murakawa
- What Will You Do, Ieyasu? (2023), Hōjō Ujimasa
- Tokyo Swindlers (2024)
- Captured Broadcasting Station (2025), Gonta Ogasawara ("Kasa-obake")
- Hirayasumi (2025), Yasuki Nikaido
- Grass for My Pillow (2026), Masao Nishi

=== Music videos ===
- Atsuko Maeda "Kimi wa Boku Da" (2012), Shinji
- Osamu Kimura "(Emi)" (2012)

== Discography ==
=== As taro ===
==== Singles ====
- Dōshite konna ni Kanashī 'ndarou (25 Sep 2003)*Cover of Takuro Yoshida

==== Mini albums ====
- Relationship (5 Feb 2003)
- Loop To The Roots (27 Nov 2003)

=== With sleepydog ===
==== Singles ====
- Start Line (19 Jul 2006)

==== Mini albums ====
- air (22 Apr 2009)

== Music provided ==
- Ken Miyake "Yūgure Orange" (V6's album Voyager's Limited edition B included on its bonus CD)
