= Asuka (wrestler) =

Japanese professional wrestler (born 1981)

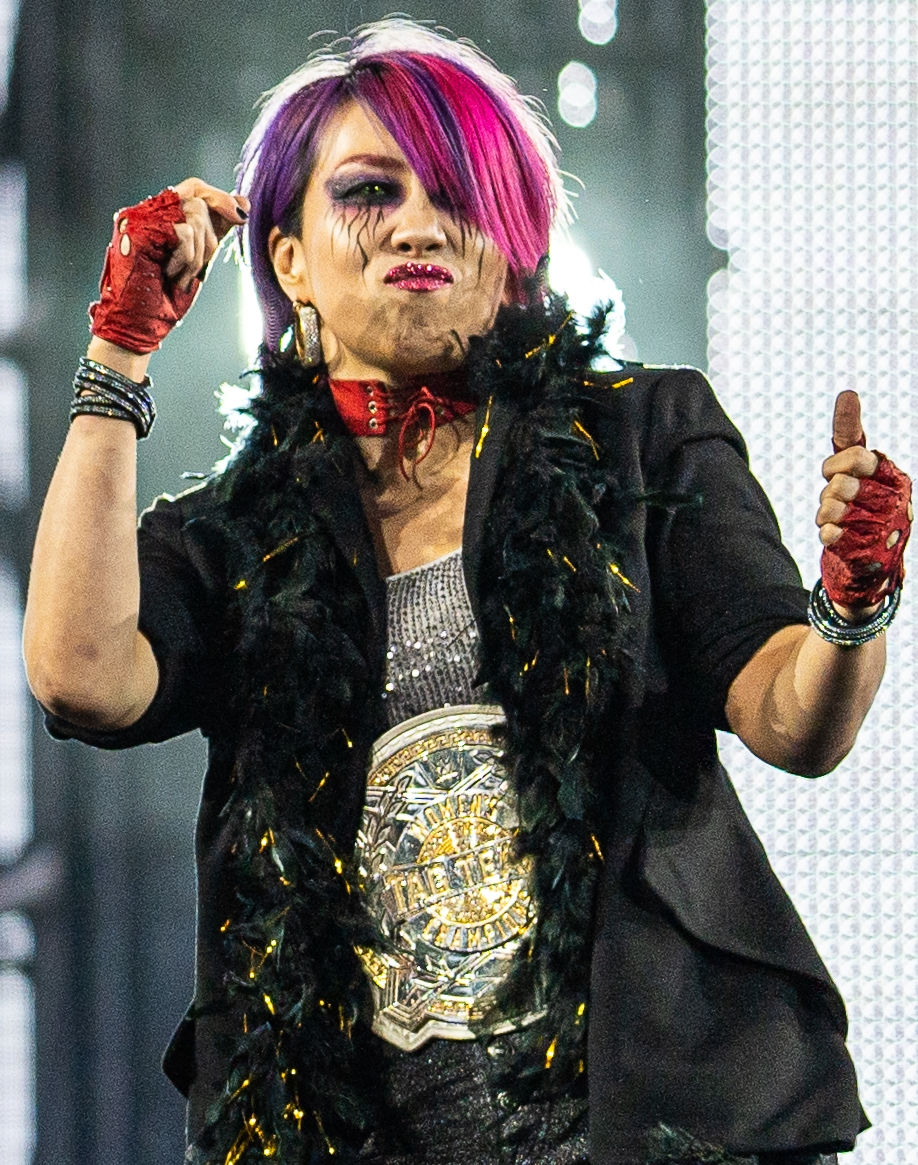
- Asuka in 2024

Personal information
- Born: Kanako Urai; September 26, 1981 (age 45) Osaka, Japan
- Education: Osaka University of Arts Junior College

Professional wrestling career
- Ring name(s): Asuka; Kana; Kana-hime; Princess Kana; Ramen Woman; Skull Reaper Kana; Tomoe Gozen
- Billed height: 1.60 m (5 ft 3 in)
- Billed weight: 62 kg (137 lb)
- Billed from: Osaka, Japan
- Trained by: Yuki Ishikawa
- Debut: June 16, 2004

Kanako Urai (浦井 佳奈子, Urai Kanako; born September 26, 1981) is a Japanese professional wrestler. She has been signed to WWE since August 2015, where she performs on the Raw brand under the ring name Asuka (アスカ or 明日華; /ˈɑːskə/). Previously known as Kana (華名), she started her professional wrestling career in 2004.

Urai started her professional wrestling career in 2004 in the AtoZ promotion, where she remained until retiring in 2006. She returned to the ring in 2007, starting to work as a freelancer for promotions such as JWP Joshi Puroresu, NEO Japan Ladies Pro-Wrestling, Pro Wrestling Wave, Reina Joshi Puroresu, Smash, and Wrestling New Classic. Her achievements during this time include winning the JWP Openweight Championship, Smash Diva Championship, and Wave Tag Team Championship.

In 2015, Urai signed a developmental deal with WWE, being assigned to NXT under the ring name Asuka, making her the first Japanese female wrestler signed with the company in over 20 years. She won the NXT Women's Championship in 2016 (with her reign of 510 days being the longest in that title's history), and was moved to WWE's main roster in 2017. In 2018, she was the inaugural winner of the Women's Royal Rumble match. She is also a former one-time SmackDown Women's Champion, five-time WWE Women's Tag Team Champion (with Kairi Sane thrice and Charlotte Flair and Alexa Bliss once each; the first woman to win this title with three different partners), and the 2020 Women's Money in the Bank ladder match winner. Following her first Raw Women's Championship win, Asuka became the third Women's Triple Crown Champion and the second Women's Grand Slam Champion. She would go on to become a three-time Raw Women's Champion, with the title renamed as WWE Women's Championship during her third reign. After her Elimination Chamber match win in 2023, she became the first woman in WWE to win the Royal Rumble, Money in the Bank, and Elimination Chamber matches.

Urai has also worked as a freelance graphic designer and video game journalist, and through her work with Microsoft, she has been sponsored by the company, wearing an Xbox 360 logo on her gear. Since 2019, she has her own YouTube channel, KanaChanTV, which focuses on gaming and lifestyle content.

== Professional wrestling career ==
=== Early career (2004–2010) ===
Urai, working originally as a graphic designer, decided to find a new career in professional wrestling after becoming a fan of the likes of Keiji Mutoh, Satoru Sayama, Yoshiaki Fujiwara, Antonio Inoki, Akira Maeda, Nobuhiko Takada, Masakatsu Funaki, Volk Han and Minoru Suzuki. Trained by Yuki Ishikawa, Urai adopted the ring name Kana and made her professional wrestling debut for all female promotion AtoZ on June 16, 2004, in a match against Leo-na. She spent the first part of her career with AtoZ, before suddenly retiring due to chronic nephritis on March 19, 2006. During her time away from the ring, Urai opened her own graphic design agency. After spending a year and a half away from professional wrestling, Urai made a comeback on September 22, 2007, and worked as a freelancer for promotion such as Ice Ribbon, JWP Joshi Puroresu, NEO Japan Ladies Pro-Wrestling, Pro Wrestling Wave and Pro Wrestling Zero1 while also forming the Passion Red stable with Nanae Takahashi, Natsuki Taiyo, Ray and Yumiko Hotta in NEO, which became her new home promotion. On October 10, 2009, Kana teamed with Takahashi to defeat Hiroyo Matsumoto and Kyoko Inoue for the NEO Tag Team Championship, Kana's first professional wrestling title. They held the title for two months before losing it to Ayumi Kurihara and Yoshiko Tamura on December 31, 2009. On January 24, 2010, Kana quit Passion Red.

=== Pro Wrestling Wave (2008, 2010–2015) ===
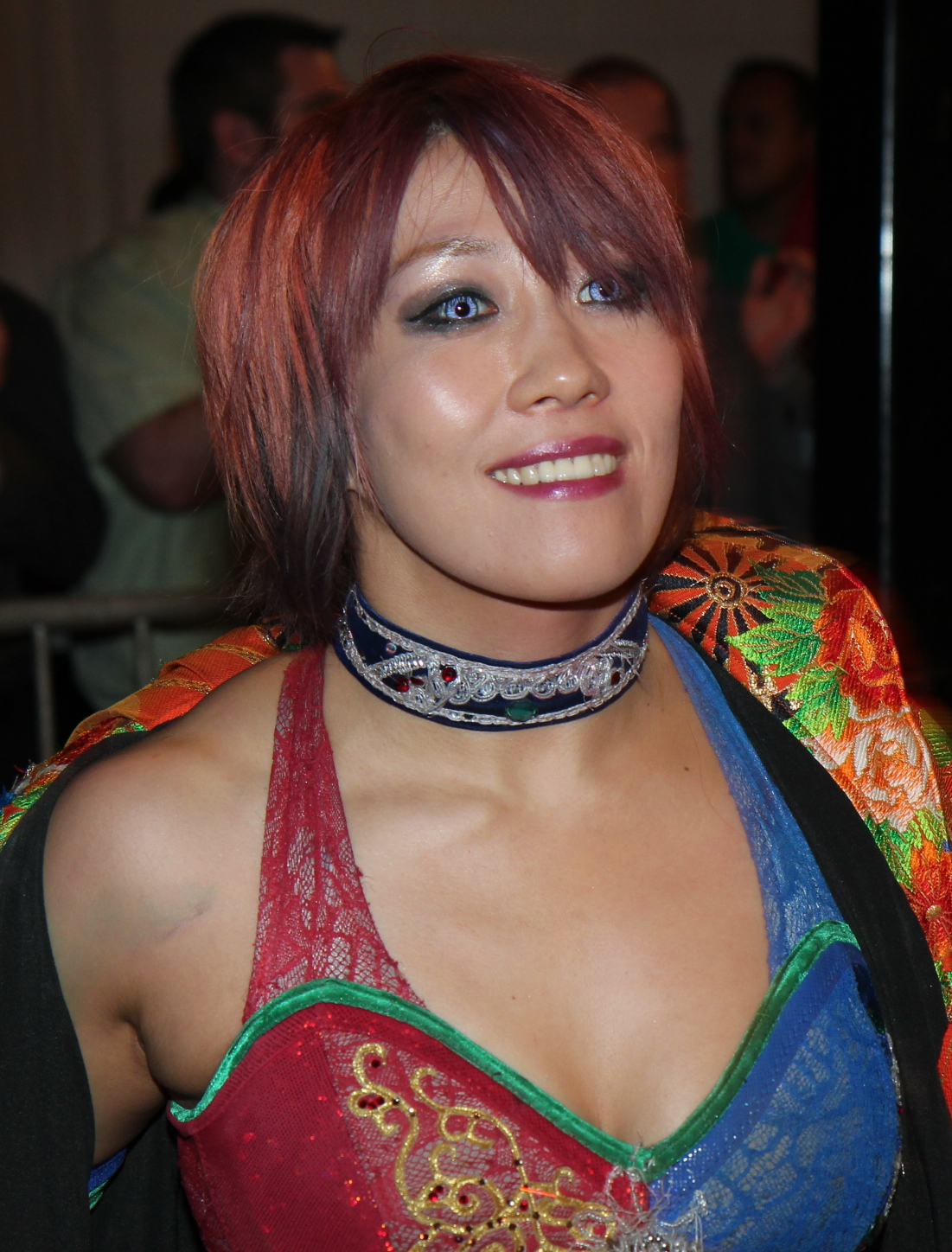
KANA in 2012

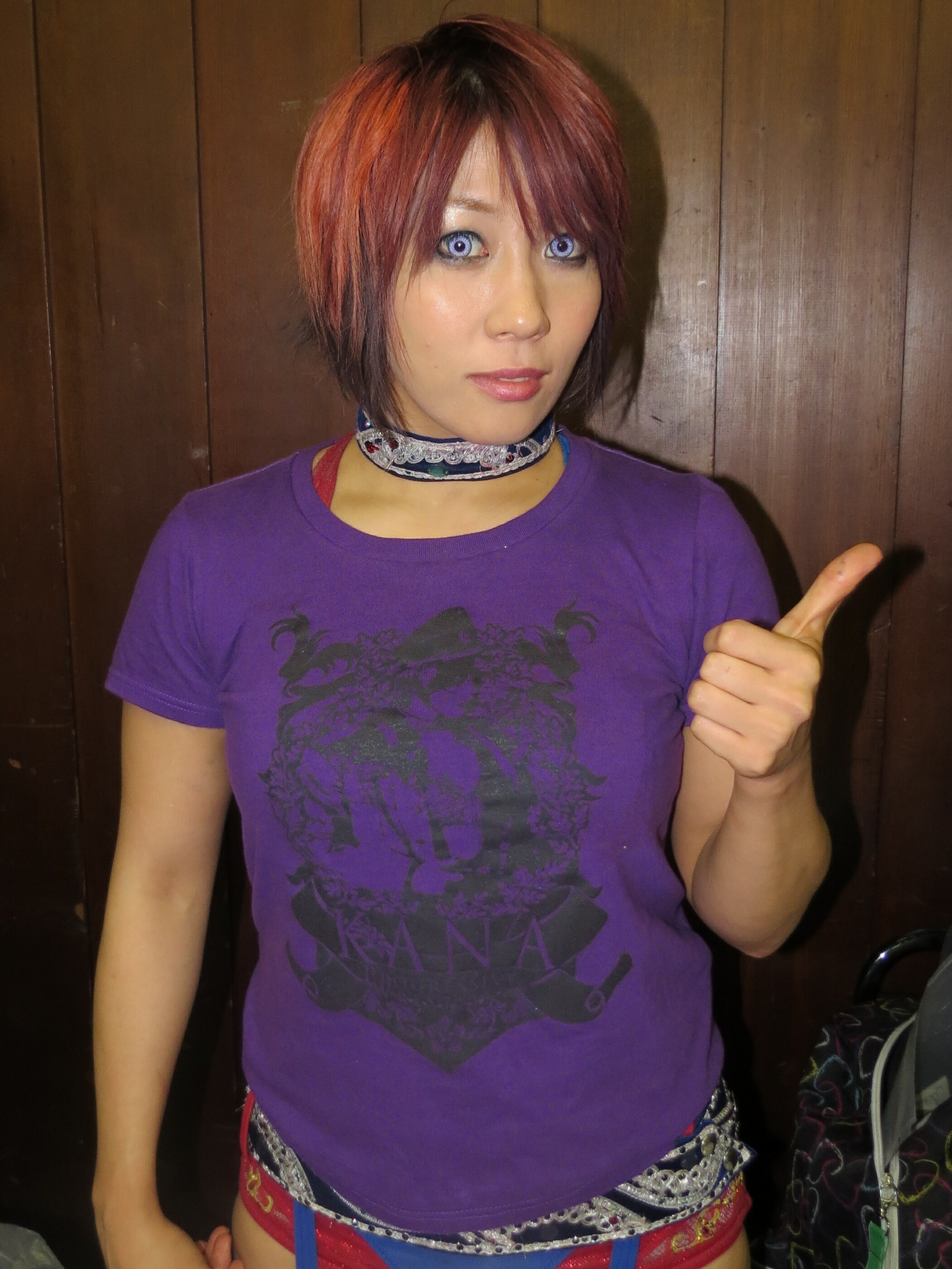
KANA in 2013

Kana had made some appearances for Pro Wrestling Wave in 2008, but did not start working regularly for the promotion until the end of 2010, when NEO Japan Ladies Pro Wrestling folded. On July 24, 2011, Kana defeated Ayumi Kurihara in the finals to win the 2011 Catch the Wave tournament. On October 30, Kana and Kurihara defeated Ran Yu-Yu and Toshie Uematsu to win the Dual Shock Wave 2011 tournament and become the first ever Wave Tag Team Champions. While a tag team champion with Kurihara, Kana also regularly teamed with Mio Shirai as Triple Tails.S and on February 1, 2012, Kurihara, Mika Iida and Shuu Shibutani were made official members of Triple Tails. Four days later, Kana and Kurihara lost the Wave Tag Team Championship to Ran Yu-Yu and Toshie Uematsu. On March 6, the new incarnation of Triple Tails was named White Tails, in reference to Wave's top villainous alliance, Black Dahlia. On November 27, Kana defeated Yumi Ohka in a singles match, after which she declared herself the new "ace" of Wave. On February 17, Kana, as the 2011 Catch the Wave winner, was granted entrance into the Wave Single Championship tournament, defeating Mio Shirai in her semi-final match. On March 17, Kana was defeated in the finals of the tournament by Yumi Ohka.

On April 21, Kana and Mio Shirai defeated Misaki Ohata and Tsukasa Fujimoto to win the Wave Tag Team Championship, bringing Triple Tails.S its first title. They made their first successful defense on July 7 against Fujimoto and Kyusei Sakura Hirota. On July 12, the White Tails stable produced their final event before the group's dissolution, during which Kana wrestled the soon-to-retire Ayumi Kurihara to a ten-minute time limit draw. Three days later, Kana and Shirai lost the Wave Tag Team Championship to Shidarezakura (Hikaru Shida and Yumi Ohka) in their second defense. From September 1 to October 6, Kana took part in the 2013 Dual Shock Wave tournament, where she teamed with Yumi Ohka. The team made it all the way to the finals of the tournament, before losing to Las Aventureras (Ayako Hamada and Yuu Yamagata) in a three-way match, which also included Muscle Venus (Hikaru Shida and Tsukasa Fujimoto). In July 2015, Kana made it to the semi-finals of the 2015 Catch the Wave tournament, but was defeated there by eventual tournament winner Yumi Ohka.

=== Japanese independent circuit (2010–2015) ===
On April 29, 2010, Kana held her first self-produced event, titled Kana Pro, which saw her lose to Meiko Satomura in the main event of the evening. On June 19, Kana formed the Triple Tails stable with Io and Mio, the Shirai sisters, and together the three of them worked for several promotions across Japan. Kana Pro's second event on January 10, 2011, saw Kana and Yuki Ishikawa lose to Carlos Amano and Yoshiaki Fujiwara in the main event. Triple Tails also put together their own shows on February 13 and May 8, 2011. Kana Pro's third event logang on September 24 saw Kana lose to Kengo Mashimo in the main event. On October 29, Kana was elected the eighth president of 666, a small independent promotion for which she had wrestled for the past year. On November 5, Kana took part in the final event held by the Battlarts promotion, defeating Aki Shizuku in a singles match.

On March 11, 2012, Kana made her debut for the DDT Pro-Wrestling promotion, taking part in an eight-person ten-minute battle royal for the Ironman Heavymetalweight Championship, which she won five minutes into the match by pinning Michael Nakazawa, before losing it with just 50 seconds remaining in the match to Antonio Honda, only to regain it via submission with just 22 seconds remaining in the match. On April 8, Kana defended the title in another ten-minute battle royal, during which she lost the title twice to Michael Nakazawa and once to Keita Yano, but each time managed to regain it and left the match with it, now as a five-time champion. On April 25, Kana made her first appearance for Ice Ribbon in three years, when she teamed with Aki Shizuku to defeat April Davids and ICE×60 Champion Hikaru Shida. On April 30, Kana lost the Ironman Heavymetalweight Championship to Ayumi Kurihara at a Pro Wrestling Wave event in the opening match of the 2012 Catch the Wave tournament. On May 5 at Ice Ribbon's Golden Ribbon 2012 event, Kana defeated Hikaru Shida in a non-title singles match. On May 12, Kana made her Mexican debut, when she took part in Toryumon Mexico's DragonMania VII event, defeating Syuri in a singles match. In early July, Kana and Mio Shirai took part in the 2012 Japan Expo in Paris, France. Kana returned to Ice Ribbon on October 20, when she teamed with new ICE×60 Champion Mio Shirai in a tag team main event, where they defeated Maki Narumiya and Tsukasa Fujimoto.

Following her December 2012 departure from WNC, Kana began making more regular appearances for both Ice Ribbon and JWP. She was, in storyline, brought into JWP by her friend Arisa Nakajima, much to the chagrin of the promotion's president Command Bolshoi, who was one of the wrestlers upset by her 2010 manifesto. On February 24, 2013, Triple Tails.S held its first self-produced event in nine months, which saw Kana and Mio Shirai wrestle Arisa Nakajima and Ayako Hamada in a main event tag team match. On May 5, Kana made another appearance for JWP, submitting JWP Openweight Champion Arisa Nakajima in a tag team match, where she and Rydeen Hagane faced Nakajima and Nana Kawasa. Post-match, Kana and Nakajima came to blows, with Nakajima claiming that she was now defending all of joshi against Kana. Ahead of Ayumi Kurihara's impending retirement, she and Kana came together on July 26 to produce the "kanAyu" independent event, which saw Kana and Genki Horiguchi H.A.Gee.Mee!! lose to Kurihara and Masaaki Mochizuki in a main event tag team match. On August 18, Kana returned to JWP and defeated Arisa Nakajima to become the new JWP Openweight Champion. Following the win, Kana, portrayed as the villainous outsider, smeared makeup on Nakajima's face, before gloating over capturing JWP's top title during Plum Mariko's memorial event. Kana made her first successful title defense on September 16 against the reigning JWP Junior and POP Champion Manami Katsu. Kana made her second successful title defense on October 14 against JWP Tag Team and Daily Sports Women's Tag Team Champion Hanako Nakamori. While continuing to badmouth JWP and its wrestlers, Kana also entered a storyline, where she began professing her love for Arisa Nakajima, much to the bewilderment of the former champion. As part of the storyline, Kana refused title challenges made by Kayoko Haruyama and Leon and instead named Nakajima her next challenger. On December 15 at JWP's annual year-end Climax event, Kana lost the JWP Openweight Championship back to Nakajima in her third title defense.

On December 27, 2013, Kana and Mio Shirai disbanded Triple Tails.S, with their final self-produced independent event taking place in early 2014. On February 25, 2014, Kana produced an independent event titled KanaProMania in Korakuen Hall, which saw her defeat Meiko Satomura in the main event. On April 16, Kana took part in a rare women's match promoted by Pro Wrestling Noah, defeating JWP representative Rabbit Miu. On May 15, Kana and Mio Shirai produced Triple Tails.S' final independent event before officially dissolving the partnership, which featured a main event tag team match, where Kana and Arisa Nakajima defeated Shirai and Kayoko Haruyama. On the next Kana Pro event on June 16 at Korakuen Hall, Kana and Naomichi Marufuji were defeated by Meiko Satomura and Minoru Suzuki in an intergender main event tag team match.

On October 5, 2014, Kana made a special appearance for All Japan Pro Wrestling, teaming with Mika Iida in a tag team match, where they were defeated by Shuu Shibutani and Yumi Ohka. During the next Kana Pro event on October 7 in Korakuen Hall Kana was pinned by Syuri in a tag team match, where she teamed with Minoru Suzuki and Syuri with Yoshiaki Fujiwara. Kana announced that she would go on an indefinite hiatus from professional wrestling following KanaProMania: Pulse on September 15; in her last match she teamed with Hikaru Shida and Syuri in a winning effort against Arisa Nakajima, Rina Yamashita and Ryo Mizunami.

=== Smash (2010–2012) ===
Kana made her debut for Yoshihiro Tajiri's new Smash promotion on June 25, 2010, losing to Syuri in the main event of Smash.4. After the match, Kana left the arena smiling and later challenged Syuri to a rematch, which was made official on June 30. In the rematch on July 24 at Smash.5 Kana, now a full blown heel, defeated Syuri via submission in just three minutes. As part of the attempt to get her over as the top villain, Kana wrote a manifesto for the Weekly Pro-Wrestling magazine, which was published on August 4 and where she attacked the entire Joshi Puroresu community, claiming it was full of wrestlers with no personality and bad attitudes and who wrestled in an unrealistic manner. The article led to a confrontation between Kana and wrestlers from the JWP Joshi Puroresu promotion on August 30 at Smash.7, but never led to a direct match. Kana then began feuding with Tajiri, which led to an intergender match on December 24 at Happening Eve, where Tajiri was victorious. Following the loss, Kana reemerged on January 29, 2011, as the leader of the Triple Tails stable with the Shirai sisters, dubbing herself Sekai no Kana (literally "World Famous Kana"). Kana then continued working against the opposite sex, teaming with the Shirais to defeat Tajiri, Ken Ohka and Yoshiaki Yago on February 25, but losing to Funaki on March 31.

In April, Kana entered a feud with Serena, stemming from a comment she made, calling Kana a talented "amateur" wrestler, while she herself had worked for the top promotion in the world. In response, Kana vowed to make Serena respect her. In the first encounter on April 30 at Smash.16, Serena teamed with Makoto and Syuri to defeat the Triple Tails in a six-woman tag team match, when Serena pinned Kana with her finishing maneuver, the spear. On May 3 at Smash.17, Serena defeated Kana with a spear in the first singles match between the two. At the following event on June 9, Smash started a tournament to crown the inaugural Smash Diva Champion, which saw Kana defeat Lin "Bitch" Byron in her first round match. On August 11 at Smash.20, Kana defeated Syuri to set up a rematch with Serena in the finals of the tournament. On September 8, Kana defeated Serena to become the inaugural Smash Diva Champion. On November 24 at Smash.23, Kana lost the Smash Diva Championship to Tomoka Nakagawa in her first defense. On January 19, 2012, at We Are Smash, Kana defeated Nakagawa in a rematch to regain the title. Kana's second reign ended also in her first defense, when she lost the title to Syuri on February 19 at Smash.25, after which the two longtime rivals hugged and made peace with each other. On March 14, Smash held Smash.Final, the promotion's final event before ceasing operations, during which Kana teamed with Último Dragón to defeat Mentallo and Syuri in a tag team match.

=== American independent circuit (2011–2014) ===
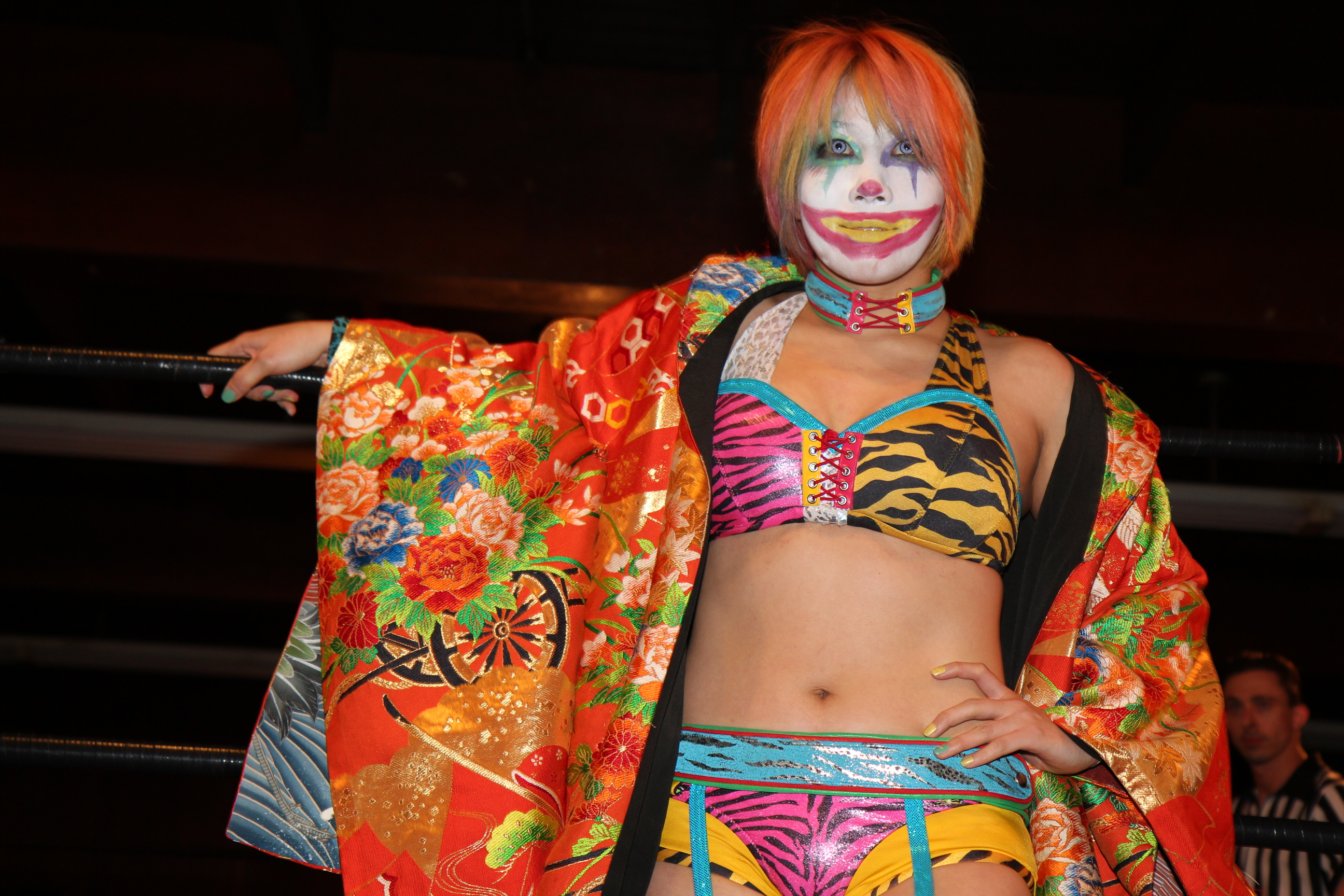
In 2013 KANA adopted the visual aesthetic of a multi-colored clown, which would become a staple of her persona for several years to come.

On August 3, 2011, it was reported that Kana would be making her debut in the United States in early October, working for all-female promotion Shimmer Women Athletes on 1 and 2 and for Chikara on 7 and 8. As part of Shimmer, she wrestled most notably Sara Del Rey, but faced also wrestlers like Mercedes Martinez, Nikki Storm, Cherry Bomb or Ayako Hamada. She also had an alliance with LuFisto. Her time with Shimmer helped her to learn the American wrestling style.

=== Wrestling New Classic (2012) ===
On April 5, 2012, Tajiri named Kana as part of the roster of Wrestling New Classic (WNC), the follow-up promotion to Smash. For the first time since 2006, when she was affiliated with AtoZ, Kana signed a contract to make WNC her new home promotion, ending her freelancing days, though the deal allowed her to continue working for Pro Wrestling Wave and producing her own independent events. On April 26 at WNC's first event, Before the Dawn, Kana teamed with Mio Shirai in a tag team match, where they defeated Makoto and Syuri, with Kana pinning Makoto for the win. Post-match, Kana verbally assaulted Makoto, which led to Shirai turning on her and siding with Makoto. At WNC's second event, Starting Over on May 24, Kana submitted Makoto in a tag team match, where she teamed with Syuri and Makoto with Riho, a replacement for an injured Mio Shirai. Two days later at Go! Go! West: Osaka, Kana submitted Makoto again, this time in a singles match. On June 17, Kana produced her first Kana Pro event in collaboration with WNC, where she and Kenichi Yamamoto were defeated in the main event by Daisuke Ikeda and Syuri. The rivalry between Kana and Makoto continued at WNC's following event on June 22, where Makoto ended her losing streak by pinning Kana in a tag team match, where Kana teamed with Syuri and Makoto with Mio Shirai. On July 15, Kana defeated Shirai in a singles match, after which she had another heated exchange with Makoto, who had been sidelined from in-ring action with a fractured wrist.

Later that same event, Kana's uneasy alliance with Syuri came to an end, when Syuri turned on her, after losing to Ayako Hamada, and joined a new villainous stable formed by Akira and StarBuck. The first match between Kana and Syuri since the latter's turn took place at a WNC event on August 2; Syuri, Akira and StarBuck defeated Kana, Hajime Ohara and Tajiri. On August 30, Kana, Mikey Whipwreck and Tajiri were defeated in a Barbed Wire Board Deathmatch by Syuri, Akira and StarBuck. Kana, Whipwreck and Tajiri were also defeated in a rematch the following day in Osaka, before coming back to win the second rematch on September 1 in Toyohashi, ending the villainous trio's win streak in the process. In the main event of a WNC event on September 17, Kana earned a big win over Syuri, defeating her via submission in a tag team match, where she and Tajiri faced Syuri and Akira. During a press conference the following day, Kana and Makoto announced that they were coming together to produce an event at Shinjuku Face on November 9, celebrating their common birthday, respectively. On September 20, Kana was defeated by Akira in an intergender match at Korakuen Hall. On November 9, Kana and Makoto produced the first MakoKana Pro event. Early in the event, the two teamed to defeat the Ice Ribbon team of Hamuko Hoshi and Hikaru Shida. Later, in the main event, Kana teamed with Sendai Girls' Pro Wrestling's Kagetsu, wrestling Syuri and JWP's Arisa Nakajima to a thirty-minute time limit draw. The match was billed as the first confrontation between Kana and Nakajima, who both started their careers in AtoZ. On November 26, Kana entered the WNC Women's Championship tournament, defeating Makoto in her first round match. Two days later, Kana was eliminated in the semi-finals of the tournament by Nagisa Nozaki, following interference from her Kabushiki gaisha DQN stablemate Jiro Kuroshio. Following the match, Kana quit WNC and once again became a freelancer, claiming that she had not been paid for months and had not been able to get in contact with the promotion's president Tsutomu Takashima. WNC officially released Kana from her contract on December 4.

=== Reina Joshi Puroresu (2014–2015) ===
On August 30, 2014, Kana began working for Reina Joshi Puroresu as a storyline consultant. After Kana used her power to strip Ariya and Makoto of the Reina World Tag Team Championship, she and Arisa Nakajima became the new champions on November 20 by defeating Lin Byron and Syuri in a tournament final, when Syuri was betrayed by her own partner, paid off by Kana. On December 26, Kana defeated Syuri to win the Reina World Women's Championship. Following the win, Kana reformed Reina as the promotion's new "general producer" (GP). In early 2015, Kana launched her own stable, originally named Kana-gun (Kana Army), but later renamed Piero-gun (Clown Army) due to all members adopting Kana's clown makeup; members of the stable included native wrestlers Makoto and Rina Yamashita, foreigners Alex Lee, Cat Power and La Comandante and male wrestlers Hercules Senga and Yuko Miyamoto. On January 12, 2015, Kana and Nakajima made their first successful defense of the Reina World Tag Team Championship against Goya Kong and Muñeca de Plata. On February 25 at KanaProMania: Advance, Kana and Arisa Nakajima lost the Reina World Tag Team Championship to Hikaru Shida and Syuri. On March 25, Kana lost her position as the Reina GP to Shida after she and her stablemates Cat Power and Yuko Miyamoto were defeated in a six-person tag team match by Shida, Shiro Koshinaka and Zeus. In May, Kana made her first successful defenses of the Reina World Women's Championship against visiting Mexican wrestlers, defeating Gitana on May 17 and Reyna Isis on May 29. On June 13, Kana made her third successful title defense against Yako Fujigasaki. On August 31, ahead of her impending departure from the promotion, Kana relinquished the Reina World Women's Championship. She wrestled her final match for the promotion on September 4, when she and Syuri defeated Konami and Makoto in a tag team match.

=== WWE ===
==== NXT Women's Champion (2015–2017) ====
On August 22, 2015, Urai attended WWE's NXT TakeOver: Brooklyn event in Brooklyn, New York, Rumours about her having signed with WWE were soon confirmed at a press conference on September 8 in Tokyo; this made her the first female Japanese wrestler to sign with the company since Bull Nakano in 1994. She joined WWE's developmental brand NXT, and adopted the ring name Asuka. Her debut appearance, which aired on September 23, ended in a confrontation with Dana Brooke and Emma. In her debut match on October 7 at NXT TakeOver: Respect, Asuka defeated Dana. Asuka continued racking victories over various wrestlers including main roster wrestler Cameron and continued her feud with Dana Brooke and Emma. At NXT TakeOver: London, Asuka defeated Emma. Both wrestlers' performance was highly praised by critics such as Dave Meltzer, who called the match "fantastic".

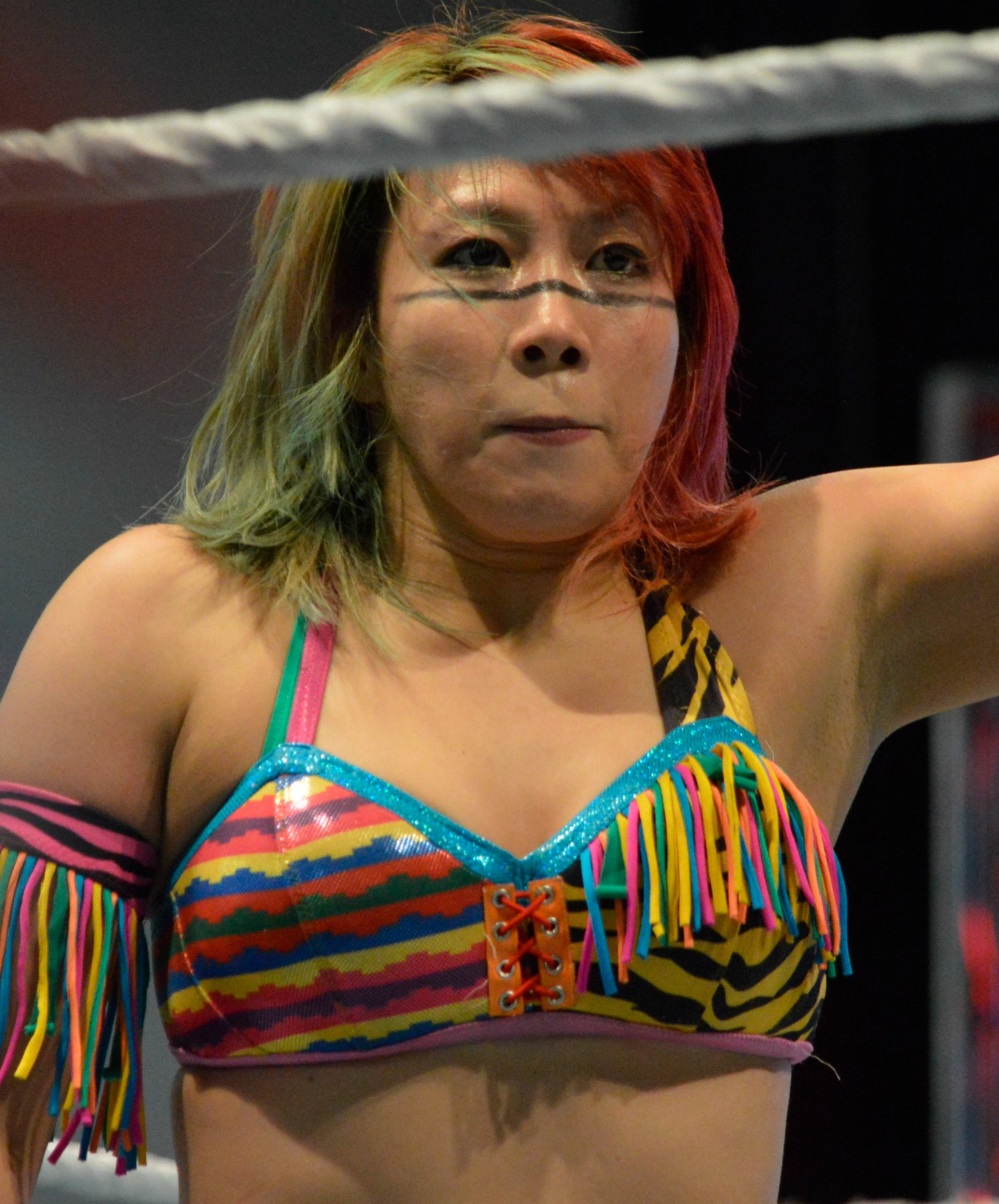
Asuka in 2016

On the January 13, 2016, episode of NXT, Asuka participated in a battle royal to determine the number #1 contender for Bayley's NXT Women's Championship; she was eliminated second-to-last by Eva Marie. On the February 10 episode, battle royal winner Carmella lost her title match against Bayley. Asuka saved Carmella from a post-match attack by Eva Marie and Nia Jax and afterwards had a staredown with Bayley, indicating that she wanted a shot at her title. On April 1, Asuka defeated Bayley by technical submission to win the NXT Women's Championship at NXT TakeOver: Dallas and successfully defended the title against Nia Jax on June 8 at NXT TakeOver: The End. In summer 2016, Vince McMahon contemplated moving Asuka to the main roster during the 2016 draft, but NXT head Triple H dissuaded him, calling Asuka "the one person NXT could not afford to lose" and the brand's "anchor".

Asuka remained in NXT and rekindled her feud with Bayley, whom she again defeated on August 20 at NXT TakeOver: Brooklyn II. After her successful title defense against the returning Mickie James on November 19 at NXT TakeOver: Toronto, Asuka displayed the first signs of villainous behavior when she refused to shake her opponent's hand after the match. On the January 11, 2017, episode of NXT when Asuka was overpowered by The Iconic Duo (Billie Kay and Peyton Royce), Nikki Cross came to her rescue but then herself attacked Asuka. Asuka demanded to defend her title against all three and won the subsequent fatal four-way match on January 28 at NXT TakeOver: San Antonio. In early February, Asuka became the longest-reigning singles champion in NXT history, male or female. In March, Asuka wrestled on several house shows with WWE's main roster as a replacement for an injured Naomi, including a show at Madison Square Garden on March 12. Around this time, WWE began promoting Asuka's "undefeated streak [...] since her arrival" in NXT. Asuka had never lost a match by submitting or being pinned, though she had come up short in the aforementioned battle royal in January 2016 and tag team match and one fatal four-way match on NXT house shows in March and May 2016, respectively, when other wrestlers were pinned.

In her successful title defense against Ember Moon on April 1 at NXT TakeOver: Orlando, Asuka again displayed a villainous demeanor, shoving the referee into her opponent to avoid Moon's finishing maneuver (the Eclipse) en route to winning the match. Asuka also attacked Ember Moon, Nikki Cross and Ruby Riott, who were the final competitors in a battle royal to determine her challenger for NXT TakeOver: Chicago, officially cementing herself as a villainess. Subsequently, Asuka had to defend her title against Nikki Cross and Ruby Riott in a triple threat match (Ember Moon missed out on the match due a shoulder injury), but she managed to retain her title at the event on June 20. In June, Asuka decisively defeated Nikki Cross in a Last Woman Standing match to retain her championship. During that time, she surpassed Goldberg's winning streak and Rockin' Robin's record-setting 502-day WWF Women's Championship reign.

On August 19 at NXT TakeOver: Brooklyn III, Asuka defeated the returning Ember Moon to retain her title. During the match she broke her right collarbone which forced her out of action for six to eight weeks, thus Asuka had to relinquish the NXT Women's Championship at the August 24 NXT tapings which aired on September 6, ending her reign at 510 days. During her farewell segment, NXT General Manager William Regal called her "one of the greatest champions in WWE history" and also mentioned negotiations to move Asuka to WWE's main roster.

==== Undefeated streak (2017–2018) ====
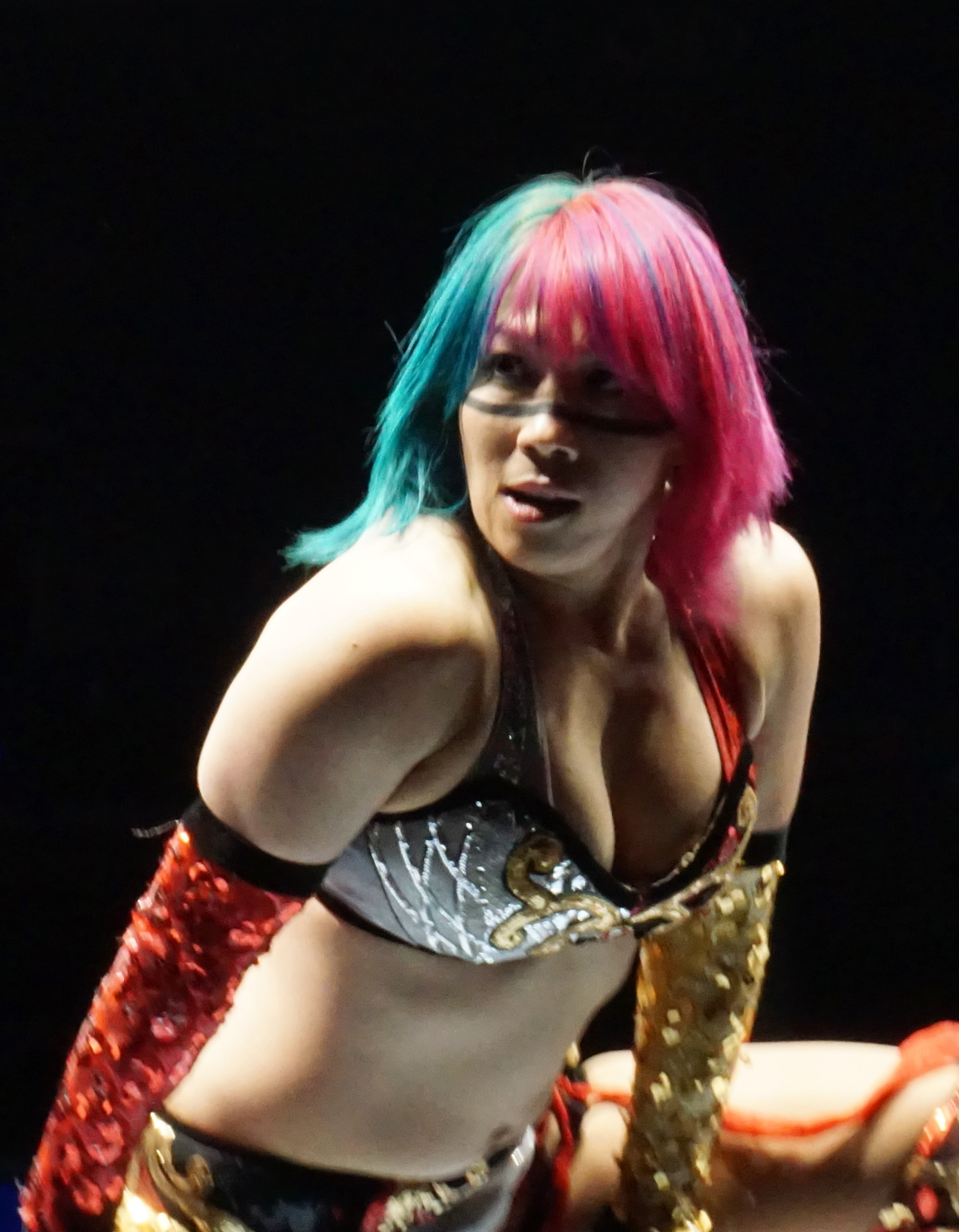
Asuka in 2018

After multiple vignettes in the upcoming weeks, it was revealed on the September 11, 2017, episode of Raw, Asuka was assigned to the Raw brand. A month later, on October 22, at TLC: Tables, Ladders & Chairs, Asuka defeated her old rival Emma in her in-ring debut. On November 19 at Survivor Series, Asuka represented Team Raw in a Survivor Series match against Team SmackDown and was the sole survivor, lastly eliminating Tamina and Natalya. Throughout the next few months, Asuka continued her streak by defeating the likes of Dana Brooke (whom she defeated in three seconds, setting a new WWE record for the fastest submission win in a women's match), Alicia Fox and Raw Women's Champion Alexa Bliss in a non-title match.

On January 28, 2018, at the Royal Rumble, Asuka won the first women's Royal Rumble match, entering at number 25 and eliminating her former rival Ember Moon and lastly Nikki Bella to earn herself a women's championship match at WrestleMania 34. Throughout January and February, Asuka started a feud with Nia Jax, who attacked her during and before her matches and wanted her title opportunity at Wrestlemania. Asuka defeated Nia Jax on February 25 at Elimination Chamber and again on the March 5 episode of Raw. In parallel, she also took a part of the Mixed Match Challenge tournament, with The Miz as her partner in support of the charity Rescue Dogs Rock. With wins over Carmella and Big E, Sasha Banks and Finn Bálor, Alexa Bliss and Braun Strowman and finally Charlotte Flair and Bobby Roode, they won the tournament. After Flair retained the SmackDown Women's Championship against Ruby Riott on March 11 at Fastlane, Asuka challenged Charlotte for the SmackDown Women's Championship at WrestleMania 34. At the event on April 8, Asuka submitted to Charlotte, ending her WWE undefeated streak at 914 days, or roughly 2 and a half years.

==== SmackDown Women's Champion (2018–2019) ====
On April 17, Asuka was drafted to SmackDown as part of the 2018 WWE Superstar Shake-up, making her first appearance by saving Charlotte Flair and Becky Lynch from an attack by The IIconics (a duo made of Billie Kay and Peyton Royce) and then—SmackDown Women's Champion Carmella. On the May 15 episode of SmackDown, SmackDown general manager Paige interrupted Carmella, to announce that she would be defending the SmackDown Women's Championship against Asuka at Money in the Bank. At the event on June 17, Asuka lost to Carmella after an interference from the returning James Ellsworth, suffering her first official pinfall loss in WWE. Paige then granted Asuka a rematch that took place on July 15 at Extreme Rules, which Asuka lost after another distraction from Ellsworth, who was hanging above the ring in a shark cage, which Carmella used to win the match. In September, Asuka helped Naomi, who after defeating Peyton Royce was attacked by The IIconics. This led to a tag team match between the two teams on October 6 at WWE Super Show-Down, where Asuka and Naomi were defeated. Also during that time, it was announced that Asuka and The Miz would take part in the upcoming season two of Mixed Match Challenge. They lasted until the semi-finals, where they were eliminated by eventual winners R-Truth and Carmella. On November 18, Asuka took part in the Survivor Series as part of Team Smackdown, where she was the last woman eliminated from Team SmackDown.

Towards the end of November, Asuka won a battle royal to enter her way into the first-ever women's Tables, ladders, and chairs match against both Becky Lynch and Charlotte Flair for the SmackDown Women's Championship. On December 16 at the namesake event, in what was also the first ever women's championship match to main event a dual–branded event, Asuka won the SmackDown Women's Championship for the first time in her career after Ronda Rousey interfered and pushed both Lynch and Flair off a ladder. Throughout her reign, Asuka was able to fend off different challengers such as Naomi on the SmackDown following TLC, Becky Lynch at the Royal Rumble and Mandy Rose at Fastlane. On the March 26 episode of SmackDown, Asuka dropped the title to Charlotte Flair in an impromptu match, ending her reign at 100 days. Dave Meltzer said she was supposed to defend the SmackDown Women's Championship at WrestleMania 35 against the winner of a fatal four-way match between Carmella, Mandy Rose, Naomi, and Sonya Deville that was cancelled in the last minute.

==== The Kabuki Warriors (2019–2020) ====
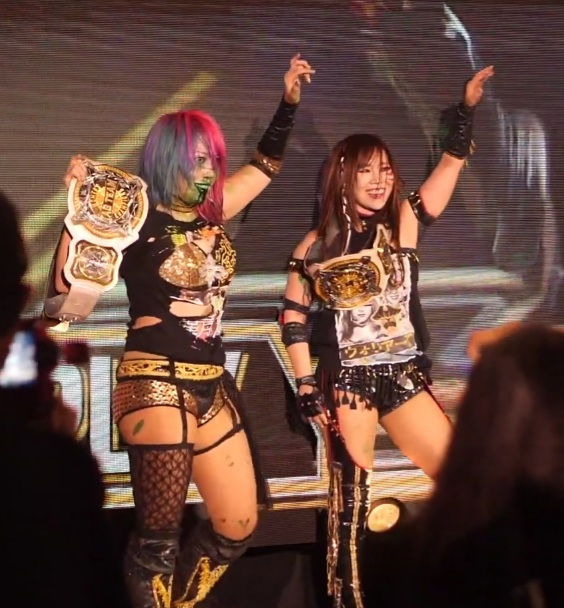
The Kabuki Warriors in 2019

On the April 16, 2019, episode of SmackDown, Paige announced that she would be managing a newly formed women's tag team, consisting of Asuka and the debuting Kairi Sane from NXT. The team of Asuka and Kairi Sane, later dubbed as "The Kabuki Warriors", was immediately put in a feud with The IIconics (Billie Kay and Peyton Royce) over the WWE Women's Tag Team Championship. After weeks of avoiding them, The IIconics lost to The Kabuki Warriors during WWE's tour in Tokyo, which earned The Kabuki Warriors a title match. The title match took place on the July 16 episode of SmackDown, where The IIconics retained after they got themselves counted–out. In August, The Kabuki Warriors failed to dethrone champions Alexa Bliss and Nikki Cross.

After a short hiatus, The Kabuki Warriors returned in September and defeated Fire and Desire (Mandy Rose and Sonya Deville). On October 6 at the Hell in a Cell pay–per–view, The Kabuki Warriors finally won the Women's Tag Team Championship from Bliss and Cross, after Asuka used a green mist on Cross. The next night on Raw, The Kabuki Warriors completed their transition into heels, as they cut a promo on both Becky Lynch and Charlotte Flair and went onto defeat them in a non–title match, once again using green mist as leverage. As part of the 2019 Draft in mid-October, Asuka and Sane were both drafted to the Raw brand. The duo further solidified their heel turn after Asuka spit green mist on their manager Paige, ending their association with Paige. She renewed her rivalry with Becky Lynch after Lynch challenged Asuka to a Raw Women's Championship match at the Royal Rumble in a rematch from the previous year's event. At the Royal Rumble, Asuka failed to win the title from Lynch. On the February 3, 2020, episode of Raw, Asuka demanded a rematch for the title, in which Lynch accepted, but a week later on Raw, Asuka again failed to win the title.

On the first night of WrestleMania 36, The Kabuki Warriors lost the WWE Women's Tag Team Championship to Alexa Bliss and Nikki Cross, ending their reign at 181 days, the longest of the title so far. On the April 13 episode of Raw, Asuka qualified for the Money in the Bank ladder match after defeating Ruby Riott. At the eponymous event, Asuka won the Women's Money in the Bank match.

==== Grand Slam Champion (2020–2023) ====
On the Raw immediately following Money in the Bank, Becky Lynch revealed that she had vacated the Raw Women's Championship due to pregnancy, and that the ladder match was in fact for the vacated Raw Women's Championship rather than a championship match contract, making Asuka the new champion. She also became the second Women's Grand Slam winner after Bayley and third Women's Triple Crown winner after Bayley and Alexa Bliss. She embraced Becky Lynch after the announcement and chanted her name, thus turning face in the process. On the following Raw, The Kabuki Warriors officiated their face turn, beginning a feud with the returning Nia Jax. At Backlash, Asuka retained the title against Jax after both were counted out. A rematch was scheduled the following night on Raw, where Asuka again retained the title. Asuka presumably lost the Raw Women's Championship to Sasha Banks at The Horror Show at Extreme Rules after she indirectly blinded the referee with the green mist and Bayley removed the referee's shirt, put it on herself and counted the pinfall, which was unofficial. The next night on Raw, Stephanie McMahon ruled that the result was reversed to a no-contest, meaning that Asuka retained the championship, despite Banks having taken possession of the actual belt. The following week, Asuka officially lost the title via countout in their rematch, where the belt could change hands by pinfall, submission, countout, disqualification or interference. Sasha Banks won the title when Asuka chose to get herself counted out to save Sane from an attack by Bayley. This also marked Sane's final appearance in WWE, as she left the company to be with her new husband in Japan, therefore disbanding the Kabuki Warriors.

At SummerSlam, Asuka competed against both Bayley for the SmackDown Women's Championship, and later Banks for the Raw Women's Championship; she lost the first match, but later defeated Banks to regain the Raw Women's Championship, marking her first time winning any WWE title more than once. At Clash of Champions, Asuka defeated Zelina Vega to retain her championship and, later in the night, answered Bayley's open challenge for the SmackDown Women's Championship, which she won via disqualification. The following night on Raw, Asuka faced Zelina Vega for the Raw Women's Championship and again successfully retained. On the October 5 episode of Raw, Asuka teamed with Dana Brooke and Mandy Rose to defeat Zelina Vega, Natalya, and Lana. On the October 19 episode of Raw, Asuka successfully retained her title against Lana. Asuka then faced Sasha Banks at Survivor Series in a losing effort. At TLC: Tables, Ladders & Chairs, Asuka and the returning Charlotte Flair defeated Jax and Baszler to win the WWE Women's Tag Team Championship, making Asuka a double champion. They lost the titles back to Jax and Baszler at the Royal Rumble. Asuka also lost the Raw Women's Championship to Rhea Ripley on Night 2 of at WrestleMania 37, ending her second reign at 231 days. On the Raw after WrestleMania, Asuka faced Ripley for the title in a rematch which ended in a no-contest after Flair attacked both of them. On the May 3 episode of Raw, another rematch between Ripley and Asuka for the Raw Women's Championship was scheduled for WrestleMania Backlash. Later that night, WWE official Sonya Deville added Flair to the championship match to make it a triple threat match. At the event, Asuka was unsuccessful to win the title and was pinned by Ripley.

On the June 21 episode of Raw, Asuka and Naomi qualified for the women's Money in the Bank ladder match by defeating the team of Eva Marie and Doudrop (Piper Niven). At Money in the Bank, she was unsuccessful in winning the match. It was her last match in 2021 before becoming inactive due to an injury. During the 2021 WWE Draft, Asuka was not drafted and was declared a free agent. After 9 months of inactivity due to her injury recovery, Asuka made her return on the April 25, 2022, episode of Raw, confronting Becky Lynch. On the May 9 episode of Raw, WWE official Adam Pearce gave Asuka a championship contender's match against Raw Women's Champion Bianca Belair. Lynch became upset and later attacked both of them during their match. The following week, Asuka defeated Lynch using green mist and earned a title match for the Raw Women's Championship at Hell in a Cell. Lynch defeated Asuka in a rematch on the next episode of Raw and she was added to the title match. At the event, Belair retained her title. On the June 20 episode of Raw, Asuka defeated Lynch to qualify for the Women's Money in the Bank ladder match. At Money in the Bank, she was unsuccessful in winning the match. On the October 31 episode of Raw, Asuka and Alexa Bliss defeated women's tag team champions Dakota Kai and Iyo Sky in a title match and won the championship. In a rematch at Crown Jewel, Asuka and Bliss lost the title back to Kai and Sky due to interference from Nikki Cross. At Survivor Series: WarGames, the team of Asuka, Belair, Bliss, Lynch, and Mia Yim defeated the team of Damage CTRL, Cross, and Ripley in a WarGames match.

In January 2023, after a brief hiatus, Asuka returned and participated in the 2023 Women's Royal Rumble match with a new look, more reminiscent of her Kana character. She finished in third place, being eliminated by eventual winner Rhea Ripley. At Elimination Chamber the following month, Asuka defeated Carmella, Liv Morgan, Natalya, Nikki Cross, and Raquel Rodriguez in an Elimination Chamber match to earn a Raw Women's Championship match against Bianca Belair at WrestleMania 39. This also made her the first woman to win the Royal Rumble, Money in the Bank, and Elimination Chamber matches and one of five people in general. Asuka failed to win the title from Belair on Night 2 of WrestleMania 39.

As part of the 2023 WWE Draft, Asuka was drafted to the SmackDown brand. She appeared on the May 12 episode of SmackDown and used her green mist to attack Belair. Their feud led to a title rematch at Night of Champions, where Asuka defeated Belair to win the Raw Women's Championship for the third time, ending Belair's record-setting title reign at 420 days. On the June 9 episode of SmackDown, the title was renamed to the WWE Women's Championship and Asuka was presented a brand-new championship design before being interrupted by Charlotte Flair, who challenged Asuka to a title match, which Asuka accepted and won via disqualification after Belair attacked her. At SummerSlam, Asuka lost the title to Belair in a triple threat match also involving Flair, ending her third reign at 70 days. She then failed to regain the title against Sky and Flair in a triple threat match at Fastlane.

==== Damage CTRL (2023–2025) ====
On the November 10, 2023 episode of SmackDown, during a six-woman tag team match pitting Asuka with Belair and Flair against Damage CTRL's Bayley, Sky and Kairi Sane, who returned at Crown Jewel and had joined the stable earlier that night, Asuka turned on her teammates to reunite with Sane while joining Damage CTRL at the same time. At Survivor Series WarGames, Damage CTRL lost to Belair, Flair, Lynch, and Shotzi in a WarGames match.

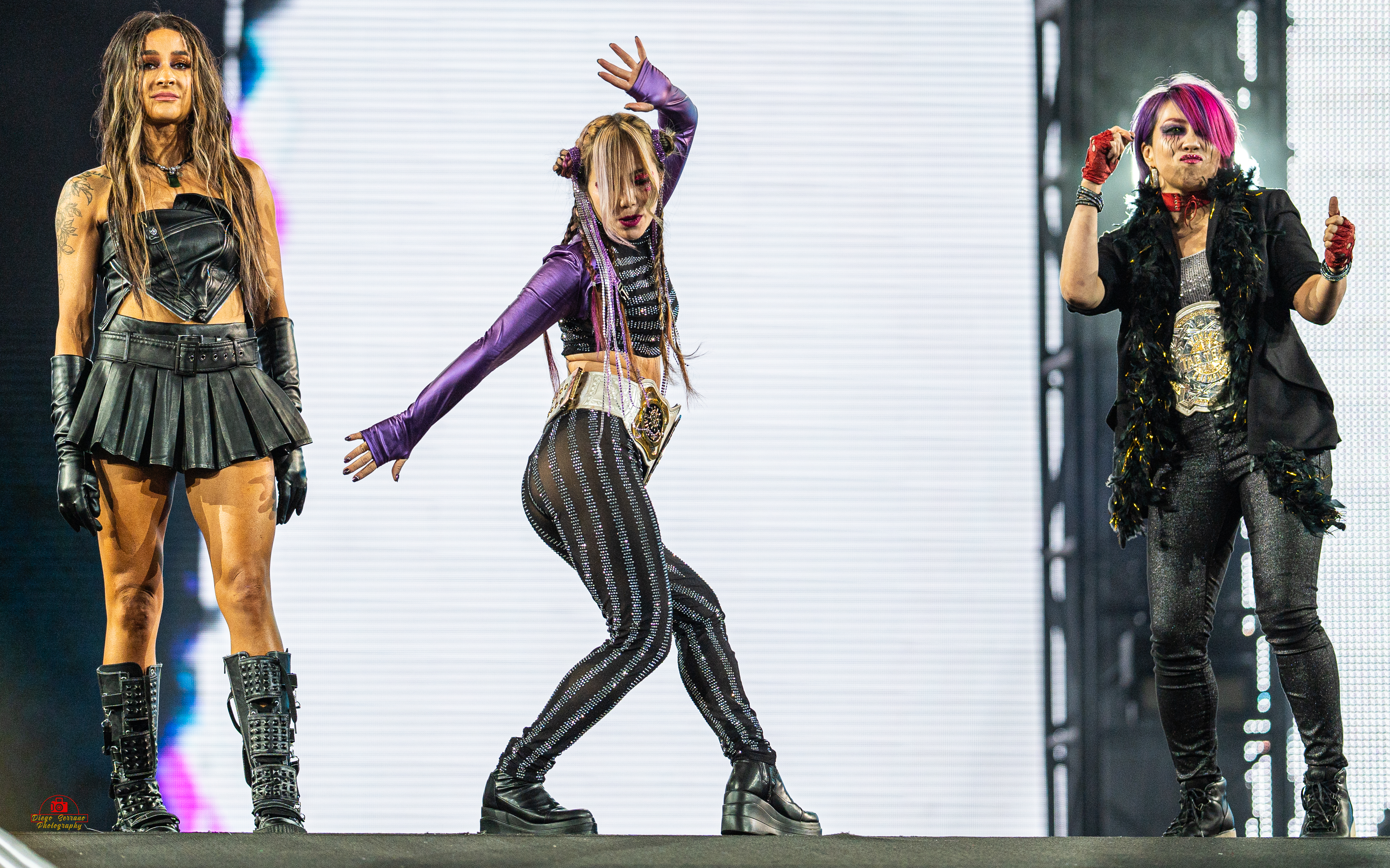
Damage CTRL make their entrance at WrestleMania XL in 2024.

On the January 26, 2024 episode of SmackDown, Asuka and Sane, again competing as the Kabuki Warriors, defeated Katana Chance and Kayden Carter to win the WWE Women's Tag Team Championship for the second time (Asuka's fourth reign individually). Asuka and Sane went on to retain their titles against Chance and Carter on the February 5 episode of Raw and against Candice LeRae and Indi Hartwell on the Elimination Chamber: Perth kickoff show. At NXT Roadblock on March 5, Asuka and Sane defeated Tatum Paxley and NXT Women's Champion Lyra Valkyria to retain their titles. On Night 1 of WrestleMania XL, Damage CTRL (Asuka, Sane, and Kai) were defeated by Belair, Naomi, and Jade Cargill in a six-woman tag team match.

In the 2024 WWE Draft, Asuka (as a part of Damage CTRL) was drafted to the Raw brand. At Backlash France on May 4, Asuka and Sane lost their titles to Belair and Cargill, ending their second reign at 99 days. Two days later on Raw, Asuka later revealed that she was suffering from a knee injury for months and had successfully undergone surgery. During Asuka's hiatus, Damage CTRL quietly disbanded after the release of member Dakota Kai.

==== Kabuki Warriors reunion and hiatus (2025–present) ====
After over a year of inactivity, Asuka made her return on the June 16, 2025 episode of Raw, entering the 2025 Queen of the Ring tournament and winning a fatal four-way in the first round, before making it to the finals at Night of Champions where she lost to Cargill. On the July 7 episode of Raw, the Kabuki Warriors reunited after Asuka came to the aid of Sane from an attack by WWE Women’s Tag Team Champions Raquel Rodriguez and Roxanne Perez. At Evolution on July 13, the Kabuki Warriors competed in a fatal four-way tag team match for the tag titles but were unsuccessful. On the September 22 episode of Raw, after weeks of tension between Asuka, Iyo Sky and Rhea Ripley, both Asuka and Sane attacked Ripley and Sky, thus turning heel. At Crown Jewel on October 11, Asuka and Sane faced Sky and Ripley in a losing effort. On the November 10 episode of Raw, Asuka and Sane defeated Alexa Bliss and Charlotte Flair to win the WWE Women’s Tag Team Championship for the third time (Asuka’s fifth reign individually). At Survivor Series: WarGames on November 29, Asuka along with Sane, Lash Legend, Nia Jax and Becky Lynch lost to Ripley, Sky, Charlotte Flair, Alexa Bliss and AJ Lee in a WarGames match.

On the January 5, 2026 episode of Raw, Asuka and Sane lost the titles to Ripley and Sky, ending their reign at 56 days. At the Royal Rumble on January 31, Asuka entered the match at #21 being eliminated by Sane. On February 16 episode of Raw, Asuka defeated Bayley and Nattie to qualify for the Elimination Chamber on February 28. At the event, Asuka failed to win the match after she was eliminated by Raquel Rodriguez. On April 20 on the Raw after WrestleMania 42, The Kabuki Warriors wrestled their last match as a faction when they lost a tag team match to Rhea Ripley and Iyo Sky in Sane's last match with the company. On April 24, 2026, The Kabuki Warriors disbanded after Sane was released by WWE, leaving Asuka as a singles wrestler. At Backlash on May 9, Asuka lost to Sky ending their feud, after the match both Sky and Asuka showed respect to one another turning Asuka face in the process. After Backlash, it was reported that Asuka would be taking time off for undisclosed reasons. She would later confirm via her KanaChanTV YouTube channel that she was indeed taking time off but was still signed with WWE, although her appearances may be less frequent going forward.

== Legacy ==
In December 2015, Dave Meltzer of the Wrestling Observer Newsletter stated that Urai "may be the best worker in WWE, man or woman". In 2017, Urai became the first Japanese wrestler to top Pro Wrestling Illustrated's annual PWI Female 50 list. She is the first person in WWE history to win NXT Women's Championship, Raw Women's Championship, SmackDown Women's Championship, Women's Tag Team Championship, Royal Rumble match, Money in the Bank match, and Elimination Chamber match. In 2020, she competed in more WWE matches than all other superstars. In 2021, WWE named her as one of the top 5 of the greatest female superstars of all time.

== Other media ==
KanaChanTV
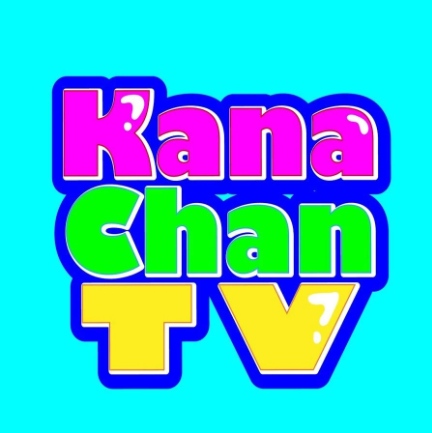

YouTube information
- Channel: KanaChanTV
- Years active: 2019–present
- Genre: Travel
- Subscribers: 644 thousand
- Views: 72.1 million
- Last updated: November 2, 2026

Urai has released three gravure DVDs, titled Manifesto (マニュフェスト, Manyufesuto; 2011), Manifesto II (マニュフェストII, Manyufesuto II; 2012) and Manifesto Final (マニフェスト Final, Manifesuto Final; 2015). She and Mio Shirai have also released a gravure DVD together, titled Sadistic Tails (2012). In September 2019, Urai launched her own gaming and cooking channel on YouTube, KanaChanTV. She had teased the channel with several posts on her Twitter account before formally announcing the channel. KanaChanTV features playthrough videos with her own bilingual English/Japanese commentary as well as lifestyle content.

=== Video games ===
Appearances by Urai in video games
Year	Title	Notes
2016	WWE 2K17	Video game debut
2017	WWE 2K18	—N/a
2018	WWE 2K19	—N/a
2019	WWE 2K20	—N/a
2019	Brawlhalla	Crossover WWE character
2020	WWE 2K Battlegrounds	—N/a
2022	WWE 2K22	—N/a
2022	Fall Guys	Crossover WWE character (cosmetic)
2023	WWE 2K23	—N/a
2024	WWE 2K24	—N/a
2025	WWE 2K25	—N/a
2026	WWE 2K26	—N/a

== Personal life ==
Urai is a graduate of the Osaka University of Arts Junior College. She has written for Xbox Magazine and designed graphics for Nintendo DS and various mobile applications; she has also owned a hair salon in Yokohama named Another Heaven. She started building her own arcade game building in Japan in July 2023.

According to Becky Lynch and Naomi, Urai is a mother.

In an interview with ET Canada in 2021, Urai detailed her own experiences with racism and shared her thoughts on the rise of anti-Asian sentiment during the COVID-19 pandemic.

== Championships and accomplishments ==
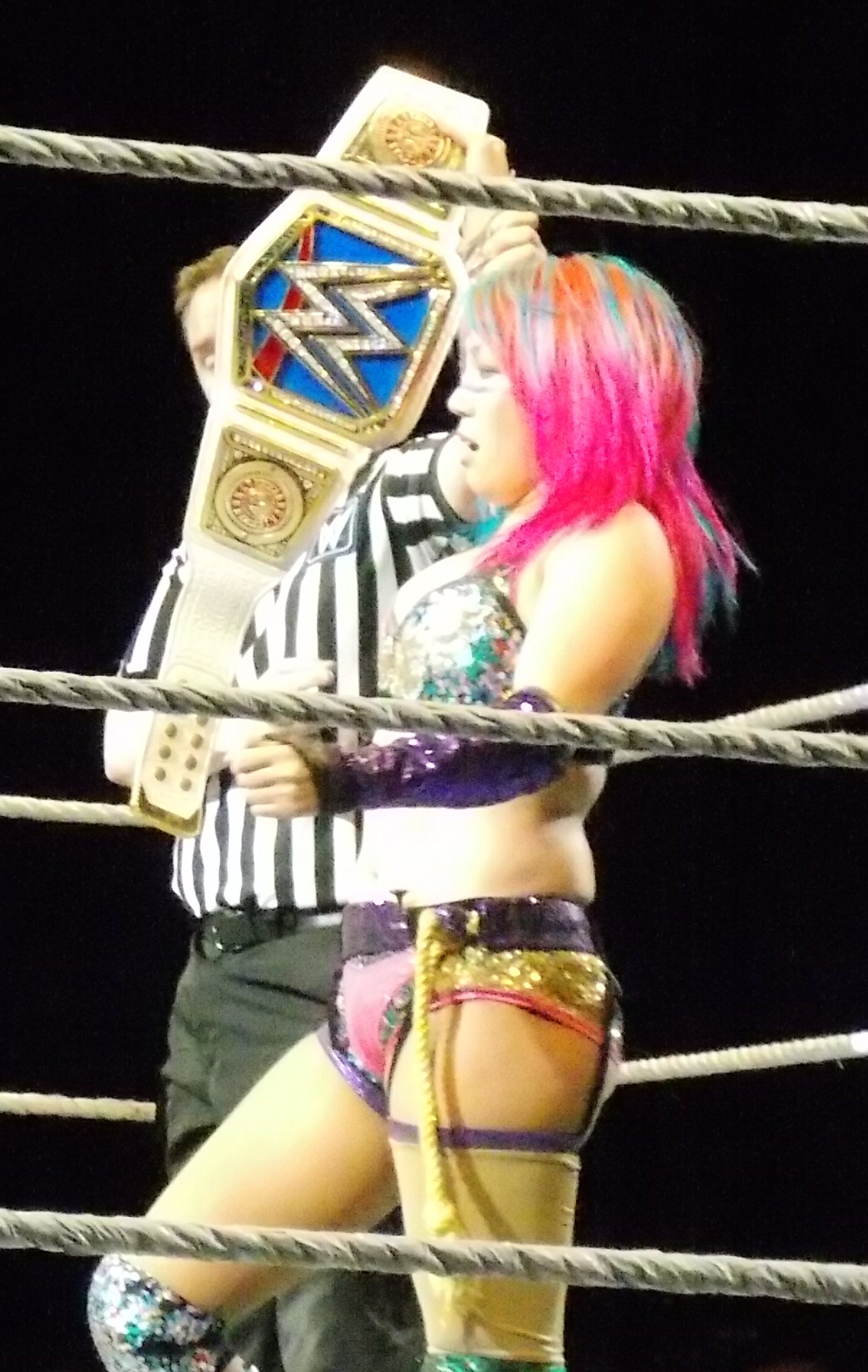
As Asuka, she is a former one-time WWE SmackDown Women's Champion...

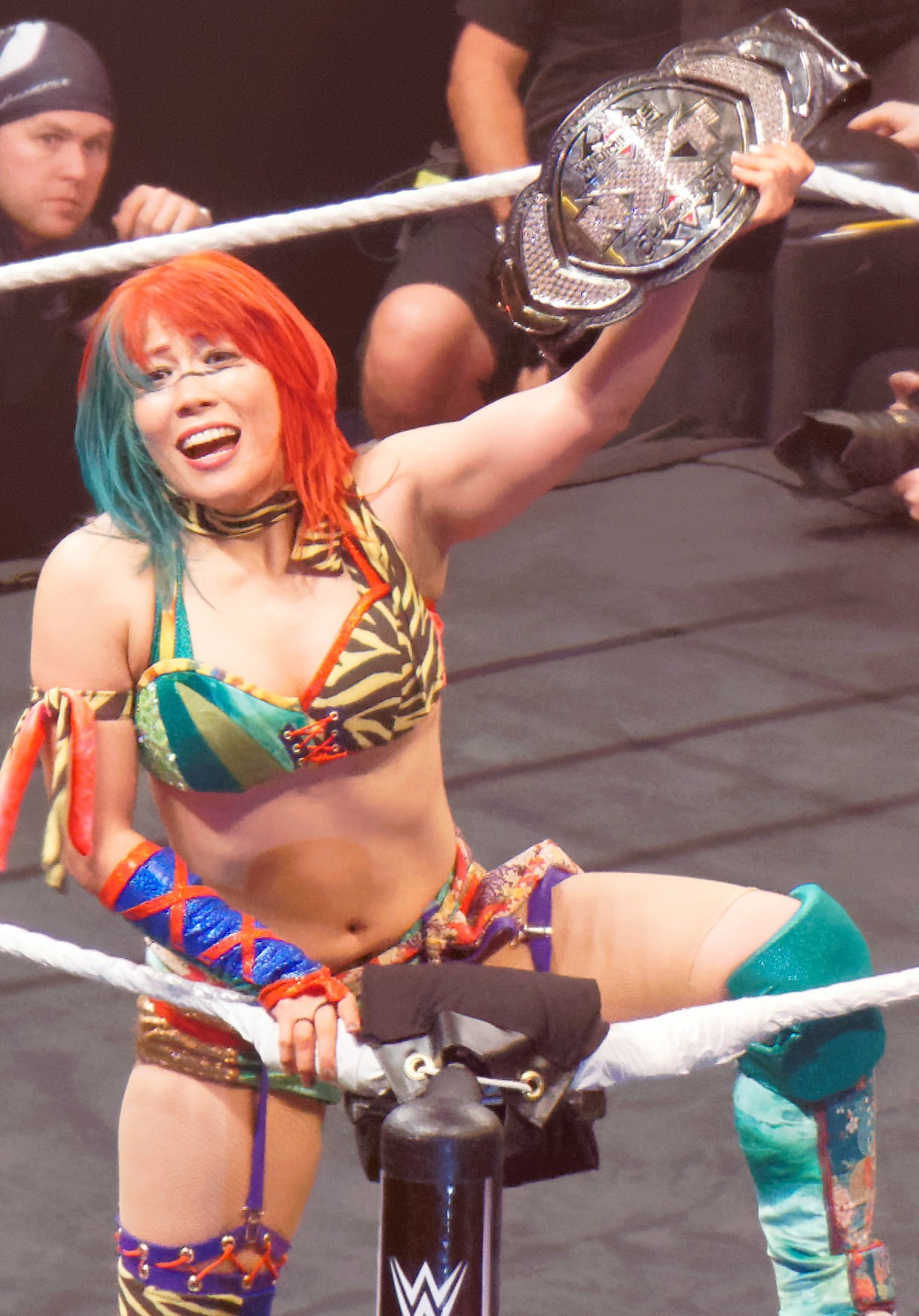
...a former one-time NXT Women's Champion...

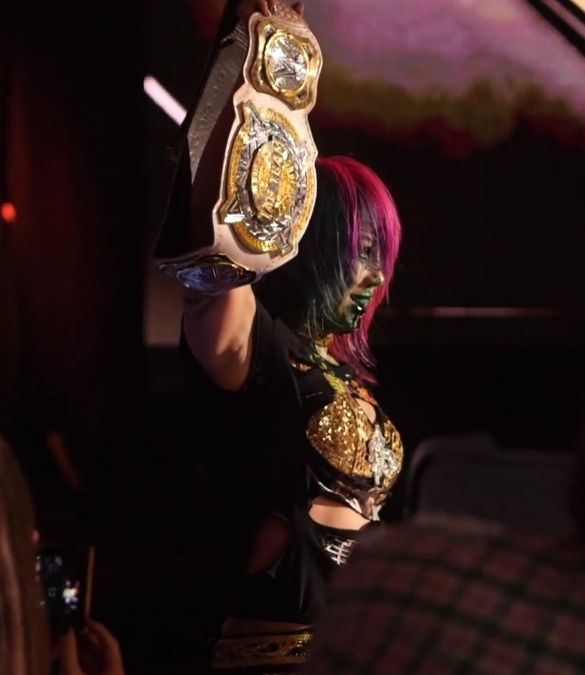
...and a five-time WWE Women's Tag Team Champion (shown here during her first reign with Kairi Sane as The Kabuki Warriors).

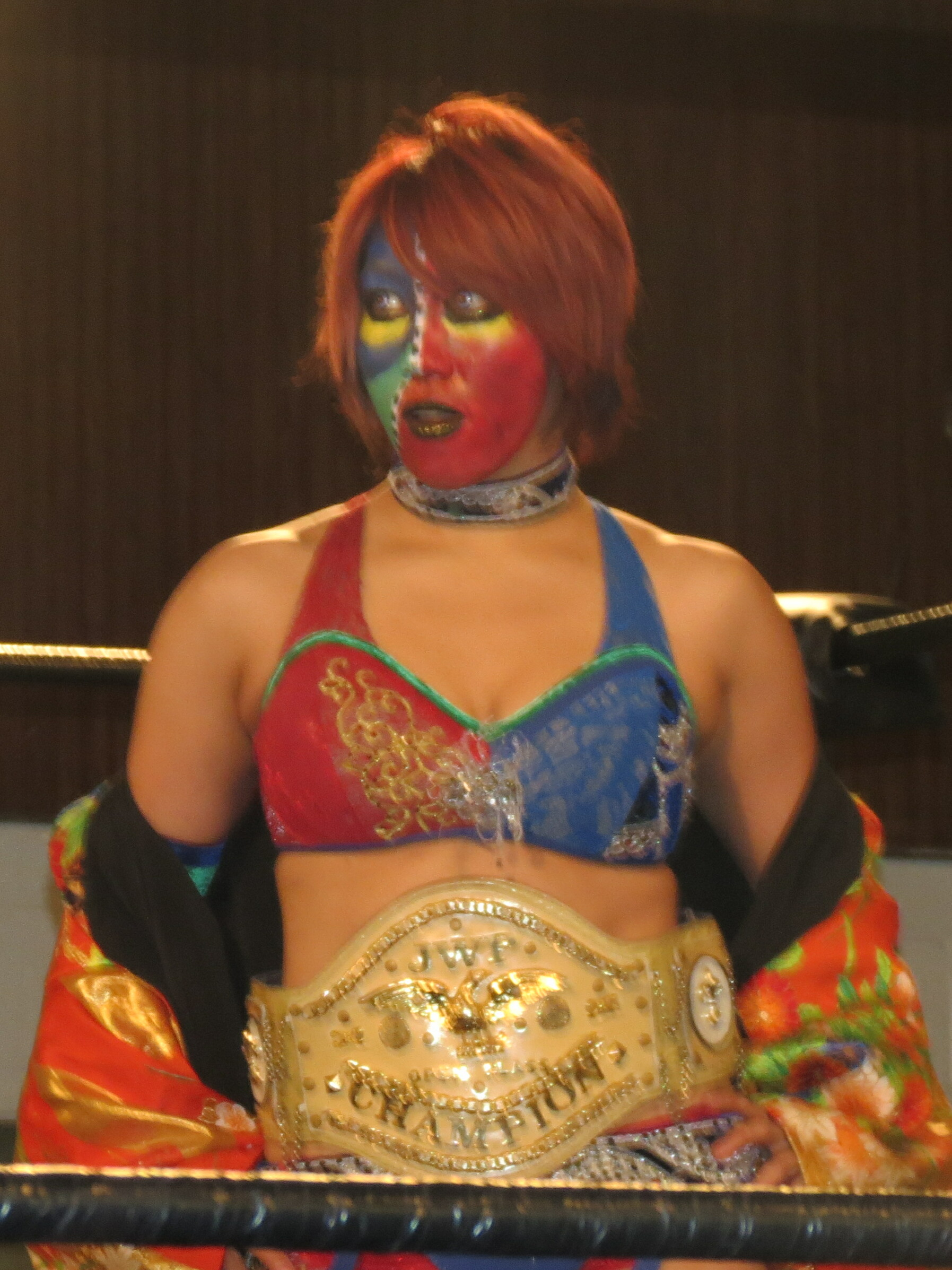
As KANA, she is a former one-time JWP Openweight Champion.

- CBS Sports
  - WWE Match of the Year (2018) vs. Becky Lynch and Charlotte Flair at TLC: Tables, Ladders & Chairs
- DDT Pro-Wrestling
  - Ironman Heavymetalweight Championship (5 times)
- JWP Joshi Puroresu
  - JWP Openweight Championship (1 time)
  - JWP Year-End Award (2 times)
    - Best Bout Award (2013) vs. Arisa Nakajima on December 15
    - Enemy Award (2013)
- Kuzu Pro
  - Kuzu Pro Diva Championship (1 time)
- NEO Japan Ladies Pro-Wrestling
  - NEO Tag Team Championship (1 time) – with Nanae Takahashi
- Osaka Joshi Pro Wrestling
  - One Day Tag Tournament (2011) – with Mio Shirai
- Pro Wrestling Illustrated
  - Ranked No. 1 of the top 50 female singles wrestlers in the PWI Female 50 in 2017
  - Ranked No. 9 of the top 50 tag teams in the PWI Tag Team 50 in 2020 with Kairi Sane
  - Woman of the Year (2017)
- Pro Wrestling Wave
  - Wave Tag Team Championship (2 times) – with Ayumi Kurihara (1) and Mio Shirai (1)
  - Catch the Wave (2011)
  - Dual Shock Wave (2011) – with Ayumi Kurihara
- Reina Joshi Puroresu
  - Reina World Women's Championship (1 time)
  - Reina World Tag Team Championship (1 time) – with Arisa Nakajima
  - Reina World Tag Team Championship Tournament (2014) – with Arisa Nakajima
- Rolling Stone
  - Eeriest Entrance of the Year (2017)
- Smash
  - Smash Diva Championship (2 times)
  - Smash Diva Championship Tournament (2011)
- Sports Illustrated
  - Ranked No. 5 in the top 10 women's wrestlers in 2018
- WWE
  - WWE Women's Championship (3 times) (Note: The Raw Women's Championship was renamed as WWE Women's Championship in June 2023. Asuka's first two reigns was as the Raw Women's Champion in 2020.)
  - WWE SmackDown Women's Championship (1 time)
  - NXT Women's Championship (1 time)
  - WWE Women's Tag Team Championship (5 times) – with Kairi Sane (3), Charlotte Flair (1), and Alexa Bliss (1)
  - Women's Money in the Bank (2020)
  - Women's Royal Rumble (2018)
  - Third Women's Triple Crown Champion
  - Second Women's Grand Slam Champion
  - Mixed Match Challenge (Season 1) – with The Miz
  - NXT Year-End Award (3 times)
    - Female Competitor of the Year (2016, 2017)
    - Overall Competitor of the Year (2017)
  - WWE Year-End Award (1 time)
    - Women's Tag Team of the Year (2019) – with Kairi Sane
