= WNC Women's Championship =

Professional wrestling women's championship

- The WNC Women's Championship belt (October 2012 — September 2014)

Details
- Promotion: Wrestling New Classic; Reina Joshi Puroresu
- Date established: October 12, 2012
- Date retired: September 30, 2014
Statistics
- First champion: Syuri
- Final champion: Syuri
- Most reigns: Syuri (2 reigns)
- Longest reign: Syuri (2nd reign, 377 days)
- Shortest reign: Makoto (25 days)
- Oldest champion: Lin Byron (31 years, 70 days)
- Youngest champion: Makoto (23 years, 186 days)
- Heaviest champion: Makoto (60 kg (130 lb))
- Lightest champion: Lin Byron (55 kg (121 lb))

The WNC Women's Championship was a women's professional wrestling championship owned by the Wrestling New Classic (WNC) promotion. The title was a spiritual successor to the Smash Diva Championship, the women's title of WNC's predecessor, Smash. The championship was first announced at a press conference on October 12, 2012, when it was announced that a single-elimination tournament to determine the inaugural champion would take place from October 26 to December 27. In storyline, the championship belt was donated to WNC by the final Smash Champion and WWE road agent Dave Finlay, who was also named the head of the WNC Championship Committee, which decides matches for the title.

Like most professional wrestling championships, the title was won as a result of a scripted match. There were five reigns shared among four wrestlers.

== History ==
=== Championship tournament ===
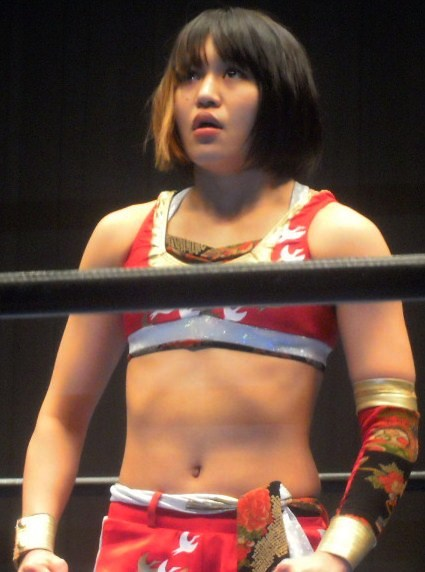
Syuri, the inaugural WNC Women's Champion

On October 12, 2012, Tajiri, the founder of Wrestling New Classic (WNC), announced the creation of the WNC Women's Championship, with a six-woman single-elimination tournament starting on October 26 in Korakuen Hall. The six participants were announced as Kana, Syuri, Lin Byron, Makoto, Nagisa Nozaki and Jessica Love, a Finnish wrestler, who was born male, but underwent a sex reassignment surgery in 2011 to legally become female. The first round of the tournament was decided that same day by a random draw, conducted by Tajiri and WNC president Tsutomu Takashima, which resulted in Love and Nozaki getting byes directly to the semifinals. The first first round match took place on October 26 and saw Syuri defeat Lin Byron to advance to the semifinals against Jessica Love. The second first round match took place on November 26 and saw Kana defeat Makoto to advance to the semifinals against Nagisa Nozaki. In the semifinals two days later, Syuri defeated Jessica Love, while Nagisa Nozaki eliminated the inaugural Smash Diva Champion, Kana, setting up a final match between the two. On December 27, Syuri, the final Smash Diva Champion, defeated Nagisa Nozaki to become the inaugural WNC Women's Champion.

First round (October 26; November 26)
Syuri | Pin
Lin Byron | 8:12
Kana | Sub
Makoto | N/A

Semifinals (November 28)
Jessica Love | Pin
Syuri | 5:50
Kana | Pin
Nagisa Nozaki | 6:03

Finals (December 27)
Syuri | Pin
Nagisa Nozaki | 5:45

=== Retiring ===
On June 18, 2014, WNC announced that the promotion would be shutting down following June 26. Afterwards, six of the promotion's male wrestlers transferred over to Wrestle-1, while its female wrestlers remained affiliated with the Reina Joshi Puroresu promotion, with which WNC had had a working agreement since January 2014. Following WNC shutting down, the WNC Women's Championship went inactive, before being brought up at a Reina event on August 30. On September 3, it was announced that Syuri, the reigning WNC Women's Champion, would face another WNC original and former WNC Women's Champion Makoto on September 30 in a match, which will mark the end of the title. On September 30, Syuri successfully defended the title against Makoto, after which it was retired.

== Reigns ==
Over the championship's one-year history, there have been five reigns between four champions and one vacancy. Syuri was the inaugural and final champion, and holds the record for most reigns at two. Syuri's second reign is the longest at 377 days, while Makoto's reign is the shortest at 25 days. Lin Byron was the oldest champion at 31 years old, while Makoto is the youngest at 23 years old.

Key
| No. | Overall reign number |
| Reign | Reign number for the specific champion |
| Days | Number of days held |
| Defenses | Number of successful defenses |

| No. | Champion | Championship change | | | Reign statistics | | | Notes | Ref. |
| No. | Champion | Date | Event | Location | Reign | Days | Defenses | Notes | Ref. |
|---|---|---|---|---|---|---|---|---|---|
| 1 | Syuri | December 27, 2012 | Tokyo Korakuen Hall Tournament | Tokyo, Japan | 1 | 94 | 0 | Syuri defeated Nagisa Nozaki in the finals of a six-woman tournament to become the inaugural champion. | |
| 2 | Makoto | March 31, 2013 | Shinjuku Face Tournament Evening Section | Tokyo, Japan | 1 | 25 | 0 | | |
| 3 | Lin Byron | April 25, 2013 | Korakuen Hall Dai Kessen | Tokyo, Japan | 1 | 93 | 1 | This was a seven-way match, also involving Arisa Nakajima, Command Bolshoi, Kayoko Haruyama, Nikki Storm and Syuri. | |
| — | Vacated | August 11, 2012 | — | Tokyo, Japan | — | — | — | The championship was vacated after Lin Byron fractured her left ankle. | |
| 4 | Serena | August 10, 2013 | Kagoshima Tournament | Kagoshima, Japan | 1 | 39 | 0 | Serena defeated Syuri in the finals of a three-woman round-robin tournament to win the vacant championship. | |
| 5 | Syuri | September 18, 2013 | Shinjuku Face Tournament | Tokyo, Japan | 2 | 377 | 5 | | |
| — | Deactivated | September 30, 2014 | Shin-Kiba 1st Ring Tournament | Tokyo, Japan | — | — | — | The championship retired due to WNC having shut down on June 26, 2014. | |

== Combined reigns ==
| Rank | Wrestler | No. of reigns | Combined defenses | Combined days |
|---|---|---|---|---|
| 1 | Syuri | 2 | 5 | 471 |
| 2 | Lin Byron | 1 | 1 | 93 |
| 3 | Serena | 1 | 0 | 39 |
| 4 | Makoto | 1 | 0 | 25 |

== See also ==
- Wrestling New Classic
- WNC Championship
- Smash Diva Championship
