= Ray (wrestler) =

Hong Kong professional wrestler (1982–2018)

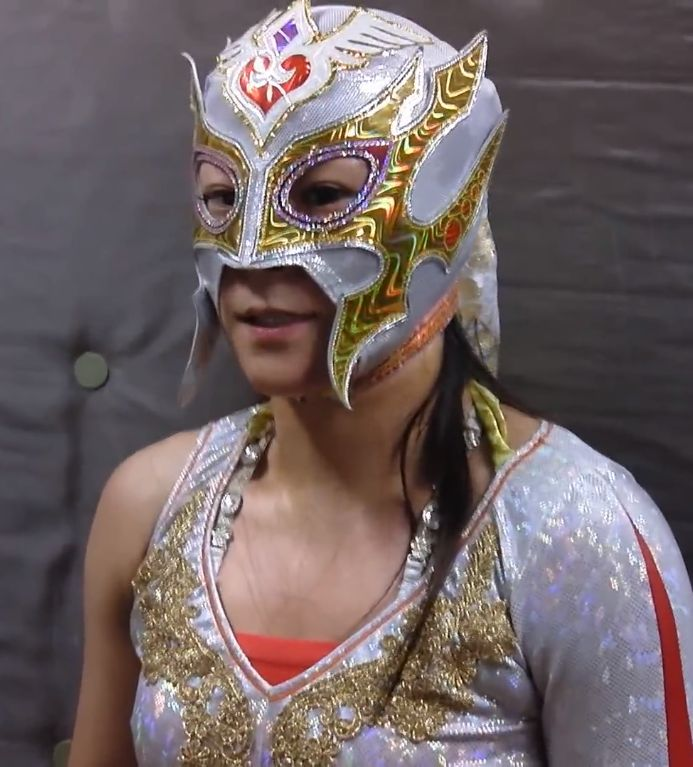
- Ray in June 2011

Personal information
- Born: February 14, 1982 British Hong Kong
- Died: August 30, 2018 (aged 36) Hong Kong
- Cause of death: Brain tumor
- Website: Viva! Ray's Dream

Professional wrestling career
- Ring name(s): Caribbean Moon; Lin Byron; Passion Ray; Ray; Ray Misterico; Rei
- Billed height: 1.62 m (5 ft 4 in) (as Ray); 1.61 m (5 ft 3 1/2 in) (as Lin Byron)
- Billed weight: 55 kg (121 lb) (as Ray); 53 kg (117 lb) (as Lin Byron)
- Billed from: Hong Kong
- Trained by: Emi Sakura; Mariko Yoshida
- Debut: September 15, 2003

Ray (February 14, 1982 – August 30, 2018) was a Hong Kong professional wrestler. Trained by Emi Sakura, she made her professional wrestling debut in September 2003 and would for the next several years wrestle under different masks, before she began working for Smash in March 2010, unmasked under the ring name Lin Byron (Japanese: リン・バイロン, simplified Chinese: 林白龙; traditional Chinese: 林白龍; pinyin: Lín Báilóng; Cantonese Yale: Làhm Baahk-lùhng) (sometimes transliterated as Lin Bairon). She remained with Smash until the promotion folded in March 2012, after which she transferred over to its successor, Wrestling New Classic (WNC), which lasted until June 2014. In April 2013, Byron became the third WNC Women's Champion. She revived the Ray character in January 2011, initially signing with Ice Ribbon, before becoming a freelancer in May 2012. Afterwards, she mainly worked for the Reina Joshi Puroresu promotion, while also promoting her own independent events and traveling to the United States to work for Shimmer Women Athletes. During her career, Ray held the CMLL-Reina International Junior, International Ribbon Tag Team and WNC Women's Championships, among other titles. After being diagnosed with a brain tumor in December 2015, she died in August 2018.

== Professional wrestling career ==
=== Gatokunyan and Ibuki (2003–2011) ===
Trained by Emi Sakura at the Gatokunyan dojo, she made her debut under the ring name Rei (Japanese for "Zero") on September 15, 2003, facing Sakura in a losing effort at a show in Korakuen Hall. When Sakura left Gatokunyan in April 2006 to form Ice Ribbon, Rei was one of only few of her trainees, who chose not to leave with her, but instead remained with Gatokunyan until the promotion folded in early 2007. The summer of 2007 also saw the folding of the JDStar promotion, where Rei made appearances for six months under a different mask and the ring name Caribbean Moon, working as a member of the Caribbean Gundan stable alongside Caribbean Kim and Caribbean Rum, with all three having characters inspired by the Pirates of the Caribbean films. Under the new ring name Ray, she then began working regularly for Mariko Yoshida's Ibuki promotion, which had the goal of introducing the next generation of joshi stars to the world of professional wrestling. While performing in the promotion, Ray also underwent further training under Yoshida, alongside the likes of Hiroyo Matsumoto, Misaki Ohata and Tomoka Nakagawa. In 2009, Ray joined Nanae Takahashi's Passion Red stable, which she would represent in promotions such as NEO Japan Ladies Pro Wrestling, Big Japan Pro Wrestling (BJW), JWP Joshi Puroresu and Oz Academy, performing under the ring name Passion Ray. When Ibuki ceased its operations in early 2010, the Ray character went inactive as its performer began working for Smash unmasked. However, on January 25, 2011, Ray held a press conference, announcing that she was making a comeback on February 5, now working as a freelancer on the Japanese independent circuit.

=== Ice Ribbon (2008, 2011–2012) ===
Ray made her debut for her trainer Emi Sakura's Ice Ribbon promotion on June 1, 2008, when she teamed with Mai Ichii to defeat Sakura and Kazumi Shimouma in the tag team main event. Her next Ice Ribbon appearance took place on February 23, 2011, when she began wrestling regularly for the promotion. Ray quickly began feuding with Ice Ribbon Triple Crown Champion Tsukasa Fujimoto, pinning her in a tag team match on February 26, only Ray's second match back in the promotion. After unsuccessfully challenging Fujimoto for the ICE×60 Championship on March 21, Ray teamed with Emi Sakura five days later to defeat Fujimoto and Hikaru Shida for the International Ribbon Tag Team Championship. After the match, Ray officially named Ice Ribbon her new home promotion, ending her freelancing days. During the next two months, Ray and Sakura went on to successfully defend the title four times; against Hikari Minami and Yoneyamakao Lee on April 9, Riho and Tsukushi on April 16, Hikaru Shida and Syuri on May 5 and Makoto Oishi and Neko Nitta on May 18. On June 1, Ray and Sakura lost the title to the Lovely Butchers (Hamuko Hoshi and Mochi Miyagi). Afterwards, Ray began feuding with Chii Tomiya, which lasted until Tomiya left Ice Ribbon in late August. In January 2012, Ray formed the tag team Mascara Voladoras (Spanish for the "Masked [Female] Flyers") with fellow masked wrestler, JWP representative Leon. They would wrestle together not only in Ice Ribbon, but also JWP and Sendai Girls' Pro Wrestling. After not appearing for Ice Ribbon for three months, Ray returned to the promotion on May 5 at Golden Ribbon 2012, teaming with Marines Mask II in the Go! Go! Golden Mixed Tag Tournament, from which they were eliminated in the first round by the team of Dynasty and Hikari Minami. On May 14, Ice Ribbon announced that Ray had quit the promotion to once again become a freelancer.

=== Smash (2010–2012) ===
On March 26, 2010, at Smash's first ever event, Ray appeared without her mask, taking part in a wrestling demonstration, where she was introduced by Tajiri as "Lin Byron" and named as part of the new promotion's roster, having allegedly passed a "World Tryout" audition. Smash did not recognize Byron's extensive background in professional wrestling, claiming instead that she was a newcomer and that, after graduating Beijing Sport University, she traveled the world with a Chinese acrobatics association, before returning to Hong Kong in 2008 for a career in action movies. As part of the new character, Byron also hid her fluency in Japanese, instead speaking English in her interviews. Byron's character was a high-energy babyface, wrestling matches in a white jumpsuit and often using her martial arts background in matches. She wrestled her first match for Smash on April 23 at Smash.2, teaming with Kushida in a tag team main event, where they defeated Hajime Ohara and Syuri, with Byron pinning Syuri for the win. On May 29 at Smash.3, Byron teamed with Canadian wrestler Mentallo and South Korean comedy wrestler Kim Nan Pun in a six-person tag team match, where they defeated Akira Shoji, Syuri and Yusuke Kodama, with Byron once again picking up the deciding pinfall, this time over Kodama. On June 25 at Smash.4, Byron wrestled as part of the Smash Seikigun ("regular army") in an interpromotional six person tag team match, where she, Hajime Ohara and Tajiri were defeated by the Fight Club Finland trio of Heimo Ukonselkä, Jessica Love and Stark Adder. Now a member of the Smash Seikigun, Byron spent the following events wrestling in tag team matches with her stablemates Akira, Kushida, Syuri and Tajiri. From September to November, Byron feuded with Kim Nan Pun, ending on November 22 at Smash.10, where Byron pinned Nan Pun in a two-on-one handicap match, where he teamed with Leatherface.

On December 24 at Happening Eve, Byron was defeated by Hajime Ohara in an intergender match. During the main event of the evening, where Syuri challenged JWP Openweight Champion Kaori Yoneyama for her title, Byron, along with the rest of the Smash Seikigun, was ringside, but, unlike her stablemates, was not cheering for Syuri and eventually left the ringside area before the end of the match. Following the event, Byron claimed that Smash was playing favorites with Syuri, including holding a birthday party for her, six days before Byron's own birthday, and insisted that Smash was not big enough for both of them. On January 29, 2011, at Smash.12, Byron's losing streak continued as she and Yusuke Kodama were defeated in a tag team match by Hajime Ohara and Jessica Love. After the match, Byron slapped Kodama and then walked out on him as he was attacked by the Triple Tails stable. Later that same day on Smash.13, Byron ended her losing streak by pinning Kodama in a tag team match, where she teamed with Akira Shoji and Kodama with Syuri. After the match, Byron spat at Syuri, leading to a brawl between the two. On February 25 at Smash.14, Byron was defeated by Syuri in a grudge match. After the match, the distraught Byron was comforted by Michael Kovac, who took her under his supervision. At Smash.15, Byron made her first appearance as Lin "Bitch" Byron. As part of her new villainous persona, she had dyed her hair black and changed her white jumpsuit to a black leather suit. In the match, Byron, Kovac and Gabriel Antonick were defeated by Tajiri, Syuri and Sabu, when Sabu pinned Antonick, who was then abandoned by Byron and Kovac. On May 3 at Smash.16, Byron and Kovac teamed up in a three tag team ladder match, contested for the Smash Championship and Smash Diva Championship belts, which Kovac had stolen earlier from Tajiri. The match, which also included Fight Club Finland representatives Hajime Ohara and Jessica Love, was won by Tajiri and Makoto. With Smash regaining the title belts, they were put up for grabs in separate championship tournaments. Byron entered the Smash Diva Championship tournament on June 9 at Smash.18, but was defeated in her opening match by eventual tournament winner, Kana. Kovac entered the Smash Championship tournament later that same day, but was also defeated in his first round match by Genichiro Tenryu, who was supported by Byron's old rival, Kim Nan Pun. After the match, Kovac blamed Byron for his loss and attacked her, ending the partnership between the two.

On July 15 at Smash.19, Byron made her Smash debut under her Ray character, wrestling as a face in a six-person tag team match, where she, Kaz Hayashi and Último Dragón defeated Gamma, Hajime Ohara and Io Shirai via disqualification, when Ohara tore Ray's mask off her face, which she then quickly covered without revealing her true identity. Byron and Ray were treated as two completely different wrestlers, with no mention being made of the two being portrayed by the same person. On August 11 at Smash.20, Ray teamed with Yo-Hey and Yuko Miyamoto to defeat Mio Shirai, Takuya Kito and Yusuke Kodama in another six person tag team match. On September 8 at Smash.21, Ray and the debuting Ayumi Kurihara defeated Makoto and Syuri in a tag team match. Later in the event, after Kana had defeated Serena to become the inaugural Smash Diva Champion, Ray, along with Makoto, Syuri and Tomoka Nakagawa, entered the ring to challenge the new champion. The four challengers had a number one contender's match on October 28 at Smash.22, from which Ray was the first person eliminated by the eventual winner of the match, Nakagawa. Later that same event, during a tag team match, where Michael Kovac and Rob Raw faced Genichiro Tenryu and Yusuke Kodama, Lin Byron made her return to Smash, attacking Kovac and costing his team the match. Even though she had attacked Kovac and appeared in her white jumpsuit, Byron returned to her "Bitch" character at the Smash.23 press conference, when she came face to face with Syuri. On November 24 at Smash.23, Syuri defeated Byron in a hardcore match, after which the two made peace with each other, officially ending Byron's run as a villain. On February 10, 2012, Smash announced that the promotion would be folding after its March 14 event. In her final Smash appearance on March 14 at Smash.Final, Byron teamed with Kim Nan Pun to defeat Michael Kovac in a two-on-one handicap match.

=== Reina (2011, 2012, 2013–2015) ===
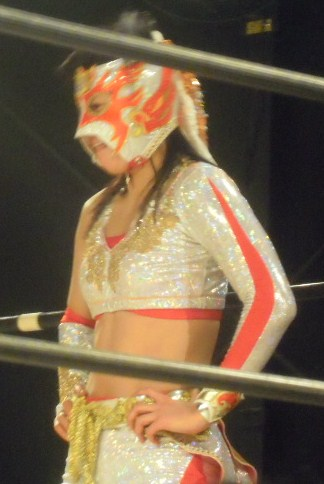
Ray in February 2011

In June 2011, Ray began wrestling regularly for Universal Woman's Pro Wrestling Reina. On September 10, she defeated Puerto Rican Zeuxis in a Two Out of Three Falls tournament final match to become the first ever CMLL-Reina International Junior Champion, a title also recognized by Mexican promotion Consejo Mundial de Lucha Libre (CMLL). Ray made her Mexican debut for CMLL on September 27, teaming with Goya Kong and Marcela to defeat CMLL World Women's Champion La Amapola, Mima Shimoda and La Seductora in a six-woman tag team match. Ray's three-week-long tour of Mexico culminated in a Two Out of Three Falls match on October 18, where she lost the CMLL-Reina International Junior Championship to Silueta. Ray returned to Reina on May 13, 2012, at the promotion's first anniversary event and final event before going out of business, teaming with Mima Shimoda and Tomoka Nakagawa in a six-woman tag team match, where they defeated Dalys la Caribeña, Goya Kong and Zeuxis.

On April 6, 2013, Ray made her debut for Reina Joshi Puroresu, the follow-up promotion to Universal Woman's Pro Wrestling Reina, teaming with Leon to defeat Mima Shimoda and Sareee in a main event tag team match. At the June 30 event, Ray unsuccessfully challenged Marcela for the CMLL World Women's Championship. On December 22, Ray and Leon defeated Aki Shizuku and Aliya to win the Reina World Tag Team Championship. Ray and Leon vacated the title on March 28, 2014.

On November 20, 2014, the Lin Byron character made its debut for Reina Joshi Puroresu, when she and Syuri entered a tournament for the vacant Reina World Tag Team Championship. After defeating Makomiya (Maki Narumiya and Makoto) in their first round match, Byron and Syuri made it to the finals of the tournament, but were there defeated by Arisa Nakajima and Kana, when Byron turned on Syuri, revealing she had been paid off by Kana. Following the event, Byron began working regularly for Reina as a villain, aligned with Kana. On December 26, Byron defeated Makoto, who was as a result forced to join her and Kana's new stable. Byron returned to Reina on July 10, 2015, to take part in former Smash and WNC wrestler Serena's retirement event, during which she defeated eight other wrestlers to win the "Serena Memorial Rumble".

=== Shimmer Women Athletes (2012, 2014) ===
On February 9, 2012, American Shimmer Women Athletes announced that Ray would be making her debut for the promotion on March 17. In her debut match on Volume 45, Ray defeated Kellie Skater. Later that same day on Volume 46, Ray teamed with Leon to defeat Davina Rose and Mia Yim in a tag team match. The following day on Volume 47, Ray and Leon unsuccessfully challenged Ayako Hamada and Ayumi Kurihara for the Shimmer Tag Team Championship. Ray's Shimmer weekend ended with her being defeated by Athena on Volume 48.

Ray and Leon returned to Shimmer on April 12, 2014, defeating The Canadian NINJAs (Nicole Matthews and Portia Perez) as part of Volume 63 and unsuccessfully challenging the Global Green Gangsters (Kellie Skater and Tomoka Nakagawa) for the Shimmer Tag Team Championship later that same night on Volume 64. The following day, Ray and Leon defeated Cherry Bomb and Kimber Lee on Volume 65, before Ray was defeated by Mia Yim in the final match of her American tour on Volume 66.

=== Wrestling New Classic (2012–2014) ===
On April 5, 2012, Tajiri announced the follow-up promotion to Smash, Wrestling New Classic (WNC), which would hold its first event on April 26. After not appearing at the initial press conference for WNC, Byron was revealed as part of the promotion's roster on April 16. At WNC's first event, Before the Dawn, on April 26, Byron teamed with Yusuke Kodama to defeat Aki Shizuku and Koji Doi in a mixed tag team match. On May 24 at WNC's second event, Starting Over, Byron teamed with Último Dragón and Yusuke Kodama to defeat Josh O'Brien, Tomoka Nakagawa and Yoshiaki Yago in a six-person tag team match, scoring the deciding pinfall over O'Brien. Two days later at Go! Go! West: Osaka, Byron suffered her first WNC loss, when she and Takuya Kito were defeated in a tag team match by Joker (Hayata and Tadasuke). On July 16, Byron, Jiro Kuroshio and Tsubasa defeated The Bodyguard, Mio Shirai and Takuya Kito in the finals of a one night six person tournament to win the 2012 Kito Cup, with Byron pinning the tournament's creator Takuya Kito for the win. On August 2, Byron wrestled her highest profile WNC match up to that point, an intergender match, where she was defeated by Último Dragón. On August 7, Byron main evented her first WNC event, in which she, Tajiri and Yusuke Kodama were defeated by Akira, StarBuck and Syuri. On August 30, Byron formed a new tag team with South African wrestler Adam Angel, with the two also starting a romance storyline. Byron and Angel were victorious in intergender tag team matches against the teams of Sonoko Kato and Takuya Kito, and Mio Shirai and Takuya Kito, before suffering their first defeat at the hands of Akira and Syuri on September 22. On October 26, Byron entered the WNC Women's Championship tournament, but was eliminated in her first round match by Syuri. For WNC's final event of 2012, Byron entered a storyline, where she began training for a confrontation with former sumo champion Akebono. On December 27, Byron, Hailey Hatred and Josh O'Brien were defeated in a six-person tag team match by Akebono, Makoto and Takuya Kito.

In early 2013, Byron set her sights on the WNC Women's Championship, however, on March 31, she failed to earn her first shot at the title, when she was defeated by Makoto in a number one contender's match. Byron finally received her title shot on April 25 at WNC's one year anniversary event, where she pinned new champion Makoto in a seven-way match, which also included Arisa Nakajima, Command Bolshoi, Kayoko Haruyama, Nikki Storm and Syuri, to become the third WNC Women's Champion. She made her first successful title defense on July 25 against Serena. However, during the match Byron suffered an ankle injury and, after an examination by a physician, it was announced on July 27 that she had fractured her left ankle, which forced her to relinquish the WNC Women's Championship. Byron returned from her injury on October 31, wrestling rookie Haruka Yoshimura to a draw in a three-minute exhibition match. Byron's official return match took place on November 2, when she and Jiro Kuroshio were defeated in a tag team match by Command Bolshoi and El Hijo del Pantera. On November 29, Byron received her rematch for the WNC Women's Championship, but was defeated by the defending champion, Syuri.

In January 2014, Byron entered a storyline, where she became the only female wrestler in WNC to refuse to sign a dual contract with WNC and Reina Joshi Puroresu (where she already worked regularly under her Ray persona), claiming that she did not want to become affiliated with a group that had Syuri as its "ace". Byron continued teasing a return to her villainous persona by starting a storyline rivalry with Makoto's Shiritsu Puroresu Gakuen stable in April. The turn came on April 25, when Byron, returning to her black attire and dubbing herself "Bitch is Back", teamed with Aki Shizuku, Alex Lee and Dump Matsumoto to defeat Makoto and her stablemates Haruka Kato, Kaho Kobayashi and Koharu Hinata in an eight-woman tag team match. On June 18, it was announced that WNC would be shutting down following June 26. This led to the promotion dropping the Byron-Makoto rivalry with the two making peace at the final event due to the Lin Byron character not making the transfer over to Reina. In storyline, Lin Byron returned to Hong Kong after the closing of WNC.

=== Freelancing (2012–2015) ===
After leaving Ice Ribbon and once again becoming a freelancer, Ray held a special fan gathering on November 15, 2012, during which she announced that she was going to produce a series of her own independent events, which would culminate in her tenth anniversary event to be held at Korakuen Hall. The first of these events took place on December 2 at Shin-Kiba 1st Ring and saw Ray team with Tigre Blanco, the masked persona of Tajiri, in a mixed tag team main event, where they were defeated by noki-A and Último Dragón. On December 9, Ray returned to Oz Academy, teaming with Leon in a tag team match, where they were defeated by A☆YU☆MI and noki-A. Ray's second "10th Anniversary Road to Korakuen Hall" event took place on April 21, 2013, at Shin-Kiba 1st Ring and saw her and Tajiri defeat Gran Hamada and Leon in a main event tag team match. On April 29, Lin Byron made her first appearance outside of Smash/WNC, when she took part in World Wonder Ring Stardom's big Ryōgoku Cinderella event at Ryōgoku Kokugikan, teaming with Gota Ihashi, Kota Ibushi and Mayu Iwatani in an eight-person tag team match, where they defeated Eri Susa, Hikaru Sato, Makoto and Michael Nakazawa. Ray's next self-produced event took place on July 13 in Kasukabe and saw her team with El Hijo del Pantera and Tajiri in a six-person tag team main event, where they defeated Command Bolshoi, Gran Hamada and Kid Tiger. On November 24, Ray returned to JWP Joshi Puroresu, when she and Leon defeated Kayoko Haruyama and Manami Katsu in the first round of a tournament for the vacant JWP and Daily Sports Women's Tag Team Championships. Ray and Leon were defeated in the finals of the tournament on December 15 by Dash Chisako and Sendai Sachiko. On January 19, 2014, Ray produced another event at Shin-Kiba 1st Ring, which saw her and Leon put their masks on the line in a main event tag team match against La Comandante and Meiko Satomura. Ray won the match by pinning La Comandante and thus saved her mask.

From January 19 to March 2, Ray and Leon took part in JWP's 2014 Tag League the Best. After two wins, the team went into the final day of the round-robin portion of the tournament leading their block, but a loss to Kayoko Haruyama and Manami Katsu cost them their spot in the finals. However, when Katsu suffered an ankle injury, Ray and Leon were given her and Haruyama's spot in the finals of the tournament. On March 16, Mascara Voladoras were defeated in the finals of the tournament by Haruusagi (Rabbit Miu and Tsukushi). That same day, Ray produced another independent event at Shin-Kiba 1st Ring, which saw her, Leon and Command Bolshoi defeat Dump Matsumoto, Nassy and Zeus in a main event six-person tag team match. On May 11, Ray produced another event at Shin-Kiba 1st Ring, which featured several wrestlers adopting new masked personas with Ray working a six-woman tag team main event under the ring name "Ray Misterico". Following the match, Ray wrestled the soon-to-retire Natsuki☆Taiyo to a draw in a special three-minute match. On August 30 and 31, Ray took part in two shows promoted by the Inoki Genome Federation (IGF) in Pyongyang, North Korea. At the first event, Ray teamed with Kyoko Kimura to defeat Dash Chisako and Meiko Satomura in a tag team match and at the second event with Satomura to defeat Chisako and Kimura. On September 25, Ray produced her eleventh anniversary event in Shinjuku Face, teaming with Syu☆ri in a tag team main event, where they defeated Leon and "Meiko Satomura Deluxe".

On October 10, 2014, Ray revived her Lin Byron character at an Akira produced Wrestle-1 event, where she teamed with Akira in a tag team match, where they defeated Nosawa Rongai and Syuri. On October 25, Ray worked her first main Wrestle-1 event, defeating Kyusei Sakura Hirota.

On December 28, 2014, Ray and Leon, the team now renamed Voladoras L×R, defeated Command Bolshoi and Kyoko Kimura to win the JWP Tag Team and Daily Sports Women's Tag Team Championships. They lost the title to Dash Chisako and Sendai Sachiko in their fifth defense on July 26, 2015.

On April 3, 2015, Ray was announced as part of the roster of the newly revived FMW promotion. She made her debut for FMW on April 21 at the promotion's first event in thirteen years, where she and Miss Mongol defeated Kagetsu and Kyusei Sakura Hirota in a tag team match. She worked all subsequent events in the first three FMW revival tours, which lasted until June 30.

On October 8, 2015, Ray held her 12th anniversary event, which saw her team with Atsushi Onita and Hideki Hosaka in a six-person barbed wire board match, where they were defeated by Arisa Nakajima, Nosawa Rongai and Sabu.

== Personal life ==
Outside of professional wrestling, Ray sang and played the piano and composed several songs of her own, which she performed at special fan gatherings. On May 31, 2015, Ray took part in NPCJ's Blaze Open bodybuilding competition, where she finished second in the women's athlete category, beating fellow professional wrestlers Command Bolshoi and Meiko Satomura, who finished third and fourth, respectively.

On September 26, 2012, she helped arrest a sex offender on board the Shōnan-Shinjuku Line train. At around 10:00 a.m. Ray noticed a man "stroking his genitals" in the crowded train, grabbed the man in a wrist lock, got him out of the train and handed him off to the police.

=== Death ===
In December 2015, Ray tested positive for brain tumor, after going to an MRI following a concussion. She underwent a brain biopsy to determine the nature of the disease on January 21, 2016. On February 17, Ray announced that the biopsy had determined that the tumor was a malignant Stage III tumor. Due to the cancer cells being attached to nerves, the tumor was also inoperable. Ray then began undergoing radiation therapy until the end of April. She stated that she was planning to return to wrestling at an FMW event on May 5, 2017, a date where Hayabusa was planning to make his return before his death. On May 6, Ray underwent emergency surgery for hydrocephalus. She died on August 30, 2018.

== Championships and accomplishments ==
- Ice Ribbon
  - International Ribbon Tag Team Championship (1 time) – with Emi Sakura
- JWP Joshi Puroresu
  - Daily Sports Women's Tag Team Championship (1 time) – with Leon
  - JWP Tag Team Championship (1 time) – with Leon
- Universal Woman's Pro Wrestling Reina / Reina Joshi Puroresu
  - CMLL-Reina International Junior Championship (1 time)
  - Reina World Tag Team Championship (1 time) – with Leon
  - CMLL-Reina International Junior Championship Tournament (2011)
- Wrestling New Classic
  - WNC Women's Championship (1 time)
  - Kito Cup (2012) – with Jiro Kuroshio and Tsubasa

== See also ==
- List of premature professional wrestling deaths
