= Smash Diva Championship =

Professional wrestling women's championship

Details
- Promotion: Smash
- Date established: September 8, 2011
- Date retired: March 14, 2012
Statistics
- First champion: Kana
- Final champion: Syuri
- Most reigns: Kana (2 reigns)
- Longest reign: Kana (1st reign, 77 days)
- Shortest reign: Syuri (24 days)
- Oldest champion: Kana (30 years, 115 days)
- Youngest champion: Syuri (23 years, 11 days)
- Heaviest champion: Kana (62 kg (137 lb))
- Lightest champion: Syuri (51 kg (112 lb))

The Smash Diva Championship was a women's professional wrestling championship, owned by the Japanese Smash promotion. Championship reigns were determined by professional wrestling matches, in which competitors were involved in scripted rivalries. These narratives created feuds between the various competitors, which cast them as villains and heroines.

== Title history ==
The tournament to crown the inaugural champion was held over three months and four events. The first round was held over two events, Smash.18 and Smash.19 on June 9 and July 15, 2011, with the semis on Smash.20 on August 11, 2011, and the final on Smash.21 on September 8, 2011.

=== Inaugural tournament ===
Round one (Smash.18–19)
Makoto	Pin
Chii Tomiya	3:59
Serena	Pin
Tomoka Nakagawa	11:24
Syuri	Pin
Hikaru Shida	11:24
Kana	Sub
Lin "Bitch" Byron	8:51

Semifinals (Smash.20)
Makoto	13:10
Serena	Pin
Syuri	13:25
Kana	Sub

Finals (Smash.21)
Serena	12:05
Kana	Pin

== Reigns ==
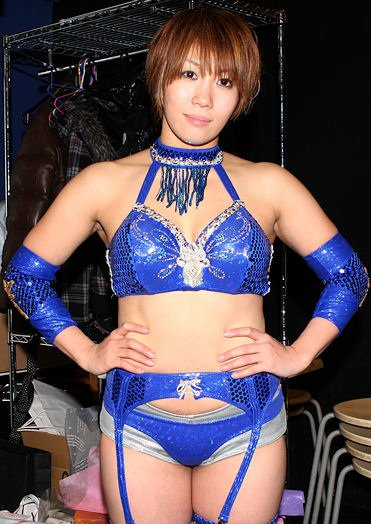
Inaugural and record two-time and longest Smash Diva Champion, Kana

Over the championship's six-month history, there have been four reigns between three champions. Kana was the inaugural champions, and holds the record for most reigns at two. Syuri was the last champion. Kana's first reign was the longest at 77 days, while Syuri's reign was the shortest at 24 days. Kana was the oldest champion at 30 years old, while Syuri is the youngest at 23 years old.

Key
No.	Overall reign number
Reign	Reign number for the specific champion
Days	Number of days held
Defenses	Number of successful defenses

No.	Champion	Championship change			Reign statistics			Notes	Ref.
No.	Champion	Date	Event	Location	Reign	Days	Defenses	Notes	Ref.
1	Kana	September 8, 2011	Smash.21	Tokyo, Japan	1	77	0	Defeated Serena in the finals of an eight-woman single-elimination tournament to become the inaugural champion.	
2	Tomoka Nakagawa	November 24, 2011	Smash.23	Tokyo, Japan	1	56	0		
3	Kana	January 19, 2012	We Are Smash	Tokyo, Japan	2	31	0		
4	Syuri	February 19, 2012	Smash.25	Tokyo, Japan	1	24	0		
—	Deactivated	March 14, 2012	Smash.Final	Tokyo, Japan	—	—	—	Syuri retired the championship during Smash's final event.	

== Combined reigns ==
Rank	Wrestler	No. of reigns	Combined defenses	Combined days
1	Kana	2	0	108
2	Tomoka Nakagawa	1	0	56
3	Syuri	1	0	24

== See also ==
- Smash (professional wrestling)
- Smash Championship
- WNC Women's Championship
