= Osaka University of Arts Junior College =

Junior college in Osaka Prefecture, Japan

Coordinates: 34°36′30″N 135°31′53″E

- 大阪芸術大学短期大学部
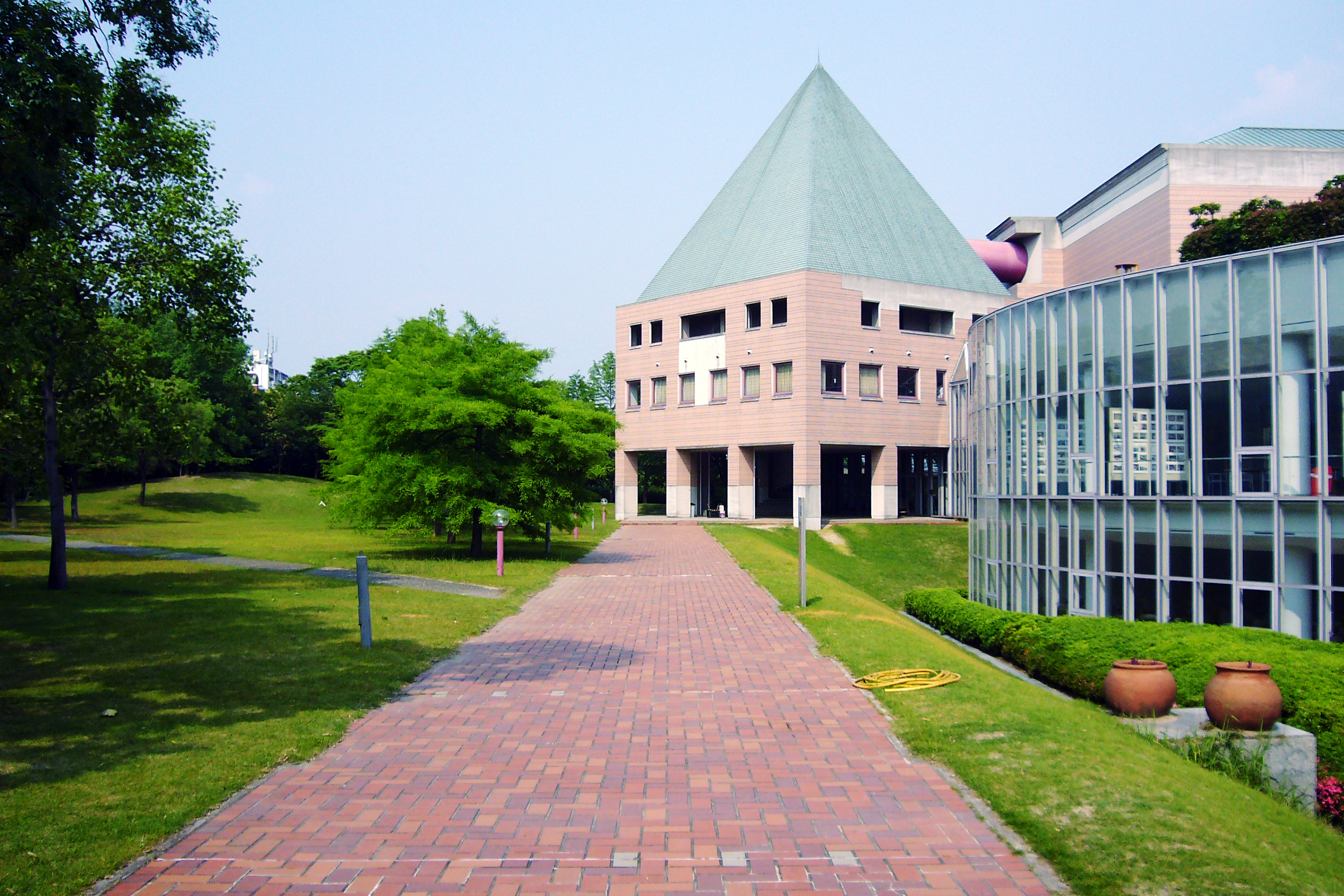
- Former name: Naniwa College
- Type: Private
- Established: 1951
- Faculty: English and American Culture childcare Design and Art public information Management Design
- Location: Higashisumiyoshi-ku Osaka, Japan
- Campus: Osaka Itami, Hyogo
- Website: http://www.osaka-geidai.ac.jp/tandai/

Osaka University of Arts Junior College (大阪芸術大学短期大学部, Osaka Geijutsu Daigaku Tanki Daigakubu) is a junior college in Higashisumiyoshi-ku Osaka, Japan, and is part of the Osaka University of Arts network.

The Junior College was founded in 1951 as Naniwa Gaikokugo Tanki Daigaku by Hideyo Tsukamoto. The predecessor of the school, a Hirano Eigaku-Juku, was founded in 1945. The course of Childcare was founded in 1953. The Distance education was founded in 1955. The foundation of Distance education course is the earliest in Japanese Junior Colleges.

== Alumni ==
Asuka – WWE Superstar.
